= International Maritime Prize =

Award by the International Maritime Organization

The International Maritime Prize is an award granted by the International Maritime Organization to individuals or Non-governmental organizations that "have made the most significant contribution to the work and objectives of IMO." The prize is usually awarded annually by the IMO Council. Even though it is possible for the Council not to grant the award if no suitable candidate has been nominated, this has never happened since the award has been offered for the first time in 1980. Nominations for the prize can only be made either by governments of states that are members of the IMO, by organizations, bodies and programmes that are part of the United Nations, by intergovernmental organizations which signed an agreement of co-operation with the IMO or by non-governmental international organizations enjoying consultative status. It is also possible that the prize be awarded posthumously.

The prize is endowed with a grant of $1,000 and a sculpture of a dolphin. In addition the awardee is invited to publish a scientific paper on a topic related to the work of the IMO which is published in the organization's quarterly magazine.

In 1998 the International Maritime Rescue Federation was the first and until now the only organization to which the prize was awarded. In 2010 Linda Johnson was the first female laureate.

== Awardees ==
- 1980: (Norway) Modolv Hareide
- 1981: (United States) Roderick Y. Edwards
- 1982: (Soviet Union) George A. Maslov
- 1983: (Iceland) Hjálmar R. Bárdarson
- 1984: (China) Shen Zhaoqi
- 1985: (Sweden) Per Eriksson
- 1986: (Egypt) Moustafa Fawzi
- 1987: (United Kingdom) James Cowley
- 1988: (Norway) Emil Jansen
- 1989: (Poland) Jerzy Doerffer
- 1990: (Greece) Zenon Sdougos
- 1991: (India) C.P. Srivastava
- 1992: (Japan) Yoshio Sasamura
- 1993: (United States) John William Kime
- 1994: (Greece) John S. Perrakis
- 1995: (Russia) G. Ivanov
- 1996: (Denmark) T. Funder
- 1997: (Egypt) Gamal El-Din Ahmed Mokhtar
- 1998: (United Kingdom) International Lifeboat Federation
- 1999: (Australia) Ian Mills Williams
- 2000: (Finland) Heikki Juhani Valkonen
- 2001: (Italy) Giuliano Pattofatto *
- 2002: (United Kingdom) Frank Wall
- 2003: (Canada) William O'Neil
- 2004: (Mexico) Luis Martínez
- 2005: (United Kingdom) Tom Allan
- 2006: (Russia) / (Canada) Igor Ponomarev * / Alfred Popp
- 2007: (Denmark) Jørgen Rasmussen
- 2008: (Panama) Alberto Alemán Zubieta
- 2009: (Sweden) Johan Franson
- 2010: (United States) Linda Johnson *
- 2011: (Greece) Efthymios Mitropoulos
- 2012: (Ghana) Thomas A. Mensah
- 2013: (Mexico) José Eusebio Salgado y Salgado
- 2014: (Japan) Yōhei Sasakawa
- 2015: (United States) Frank Lawrence Wiswall Jr.
- 2016: (Japan) Koji Sekimizu
- 2017: (Denmark) Birgit Sølling Olsen
- 2018: (United States) Joseph J. Angelo
- 2019: (United Kingdom) Peter Hinchliffe
- 2020: (United Kingdom) Paul Sadler
- 2021: (Malta) David Attard
- 2022: (Germany) Anneliese Jost

* The prize was awarded posthumously.
