= Kitack Lim =

South Korean maritime official

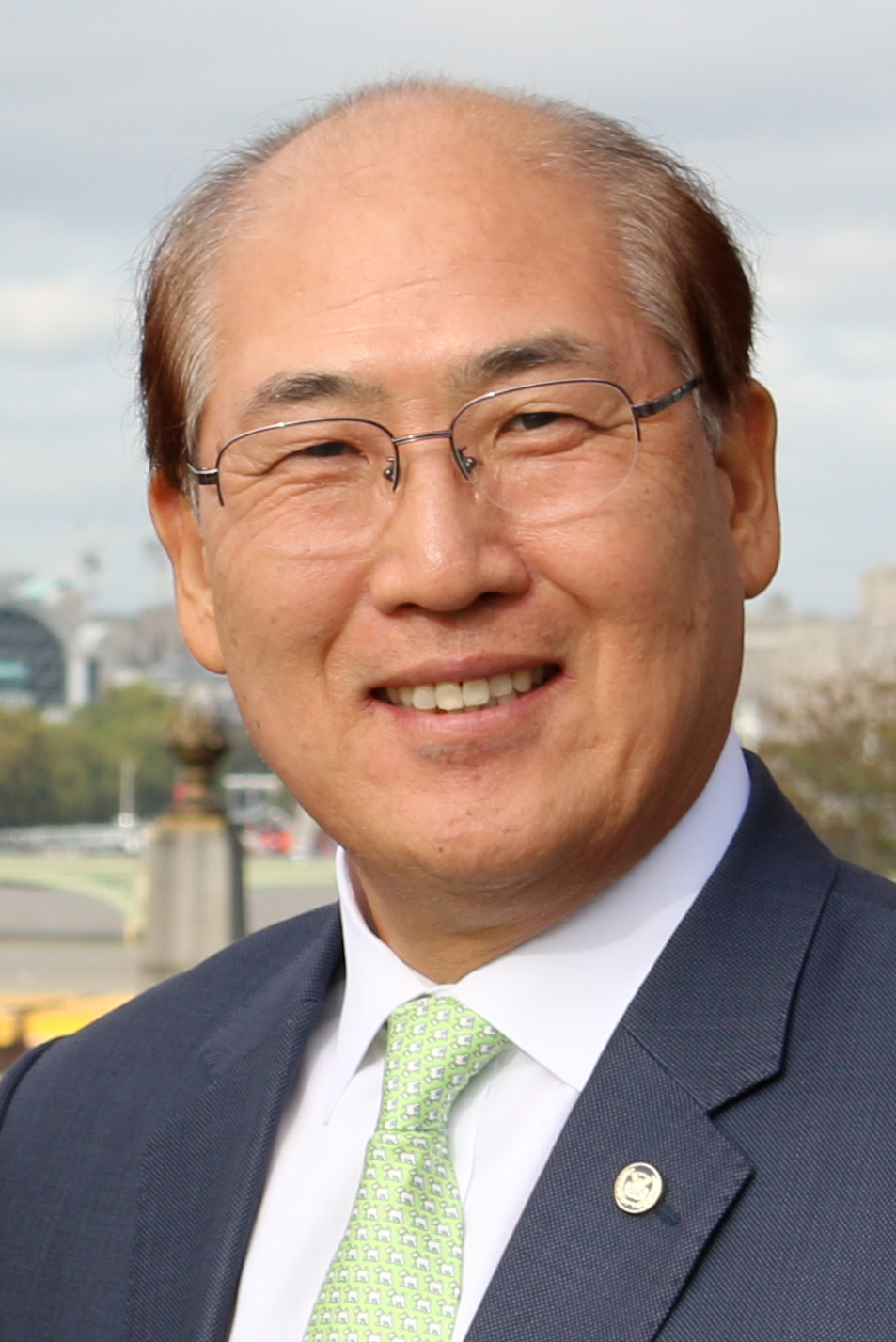
- Kitack Lim in 2017

9th Secretary-General of the International Maritime Organization
- In office January 1, 2016 – December 31, 2023
- Preceded by: Koji Sekimizu
- Succeeded by: Arsenio Dominguez

Personal details
- Born: January 22, 1956 (age 70) Masan, South Korea
- Education: Korea Maritime and Ocean University; Yonsei University

Korean name
- Hangul: 임기택
- Hanja: 林基澤
- RR: Im Gitaek
- MR: Im Kit'aek

Kitack Lim (Korean: 임기택; born 22 January 1956) is a South Korean maritime official who served as a previous Secretary-General of the International Maritime Organization.

== Early life ==
Lim was born in Masan, South Gyeongsang Province, a major port city in South Korea. He completed a degree in nautical science at the Korea Maritime and Ocean University (KMOU), Busan, graduating in 1977. He then joined the Republic of Korea Navy and worked on ships as a deck officer, later working for Sanko Shipping Co.

In 1985, he joined the Korea Maritime and Port Administration, while undertaking further studies at the Graduate School of Administration of Yonsei University, eventually obtaining a Master's degree in 1990. He then attended the World Maritime University (WMU), graduating with a master's degree in maritime administration with a major in navigation. Between 1995 and 1998, he returned to KMOU for study completing a doctoral programme for international law.

== Career ==
Lim began attending IMO meetings as part of the South Korean delegation in 1986, participating in maritime safety and environmental protection issues. From 1992 onwards, he was engaged in promoting maritime safety through the effective implementation of IMO conventions in South Korea, as well as in other IMO member states in the Asian region. In 2004, he was elected Chairman of the Tokyo Memorandum on Port State Control.

Between 2006 and August 2009, Lim served as Maritime Attaché and minister-counsellor at the Embassy of South Korea, London, leading all IMO work for South Korea, including serving as Deputy Permanent Representative. Lim was then appointed as Director General for Maritime Safety Policy Bureau at the Headquarters of the Ministry of Land, Transport and Maritime Affairs (MLTM) in South Korea. This role included leading the South Korean delegation to the IMO Assembly in 2009.

In March 2011, Lim was appointed Commissioner of the Korean Maritime Safety Tribunal (KMST). In July 2012, he assumed the position of President of Busan Port Authority. He served as President of the Port Authority until the end of July 2015.

=== Secretary-General ===
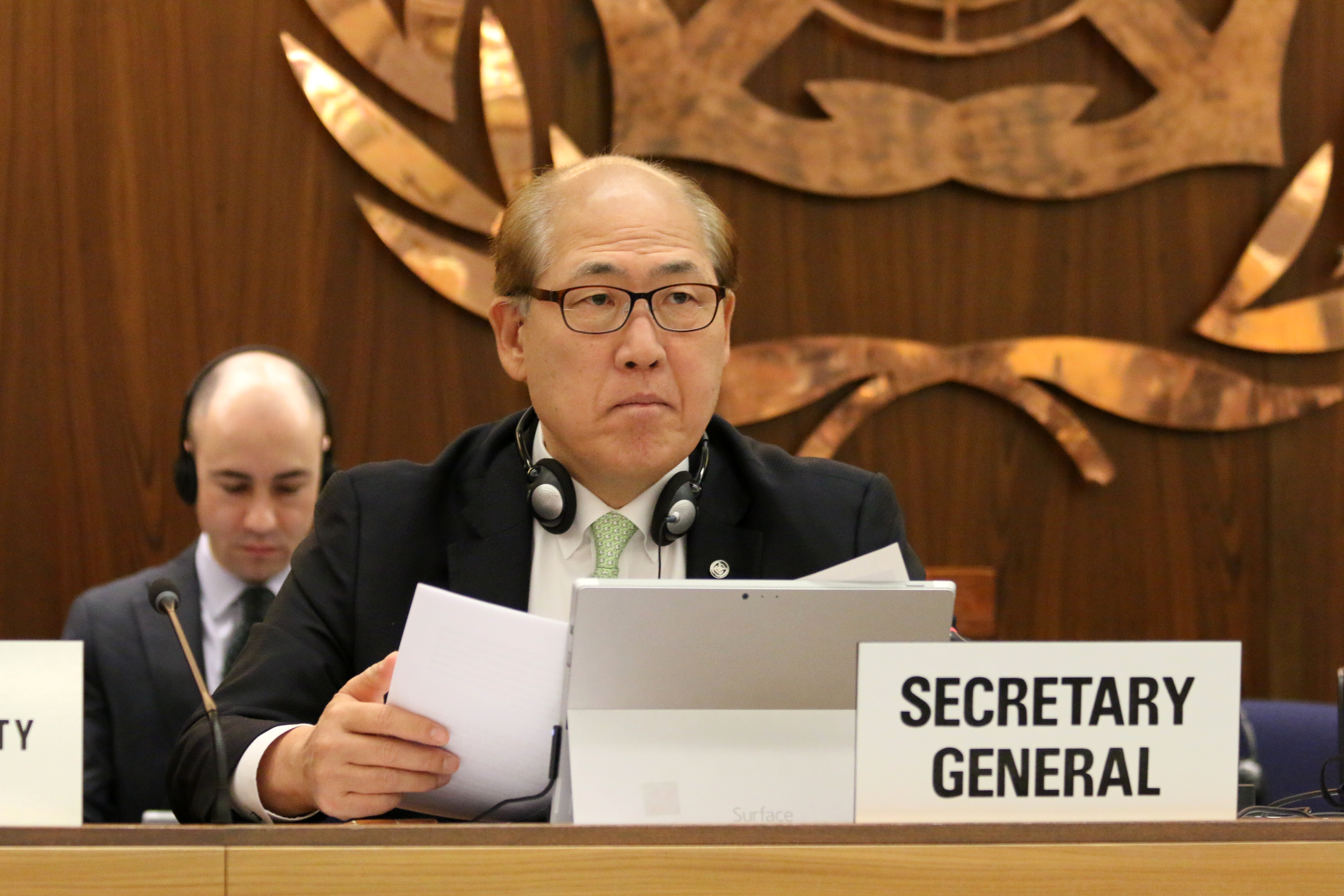
Lim as Secretary-General in 2009 at the NCSR sub-committee

In December 2015, Lim was unanimously endorsed in his confirmation to become Secretary-General of the IMO. Replacing Koji Sekimizu of Japan, his first four year term commenced on 1 January 2016. One of his first external events as Secretary-General in 2016 was to deliver the keynote speech at an e-Navigation conference onboard the MS Pearl Seaways in Copenhagen, Denmark.

In June 2017, Lim announced the 'Day of the Seafarer' celebrations, with a recorded video message. In September 2017, he made his first visit to Russia as Secretary-General holding discussions at the Russian Ministry of Transport.

In May 2018, he gave an interview on the 70th anniversary of the lMO's foundation and highlighted the three top challenges of the future for the IMO as being climate change, digitization and seafarer issues. In 2018, Lim was re-elected to serve another four year term as Secretary-General from January 2020, concurrent after his first term.

In 2020, Lim highlighted the need to protect seafarers during the COVID-19 pandemic. This included arguing for the need for further recognition and support for seafarers from governments.

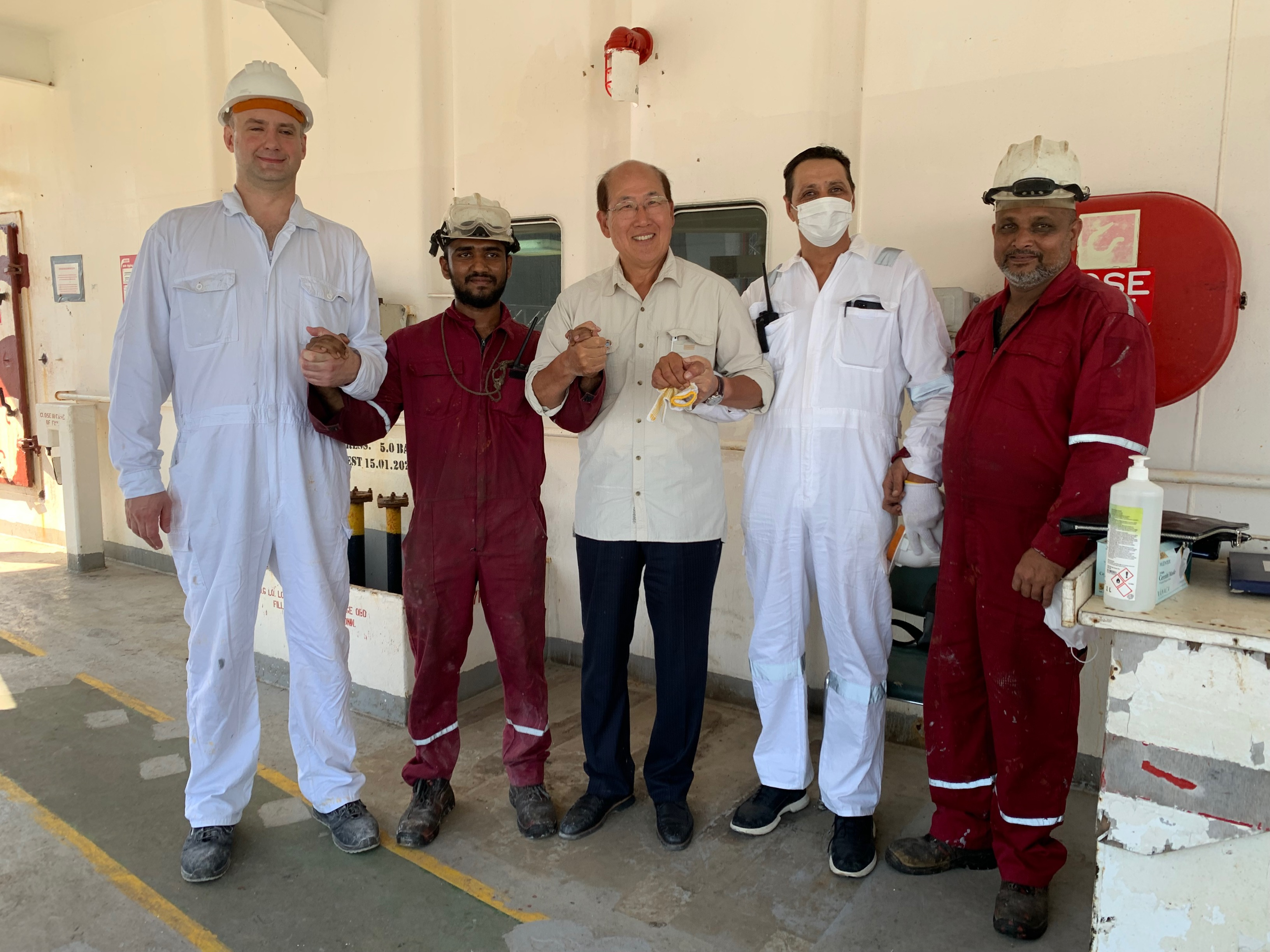
Kitack Lim visiting seafarers in the Black Sea Humanitarian Corridor in July 2022

In February 2021, he asserted that piracy in the Gulf of Guinea presented a "serious and immediate threat" to crews and vessels operating in West African waters. In October and November 2021, he attended the 2021 United Nations Climate Change Conference. This included giving the closing speech of the related International Chamber of Shipping 'Shaping the Future of Shipping' conference in which he stated that the need for the UN to take urgent action.

In July 2022, Lim visited the Black Sea to see ships and seafarers in the IMO humanitarian corridor, related to the 2022 Russian invasion of Ukraine. In August 2022, Lim visited the ports of Odesa and Constanta as part of IMO efforts relating to the Black Sea Grain Initiative.

In September 2022, following her death, he paid tribute to Queen Elizabeth II, who had opened the Headquarters of the IMO in 1983. In November 2022, he paid tribute to the former Secretary-General William A. O'Neil at the IMO, along with the release of a video tribute.

On 1 January 2024, Lim's tenure as Secretary-General ended, with his replacement Arsenio Dominguez taking office.

== Personal life ==
In a May 2021 interview, Lim stated he enjoys playing golf to relax, as well walking and watching films. Lim has said that some of his mentors have included Joseph Angelo (an American colleague and IMO delegate), William A. O'Neil and Efthimios Mitropoulos. Lim has stated that his favourite song is Delilah by Tom Jones and that his favourite film is The Father. His favourite book is 'Dynamic Governance' by BS Neo and G Chen.
