= Emma Metieh Glassco =

Liberian administrator (born 1985)

Emma Cathrine Metieh Glassco
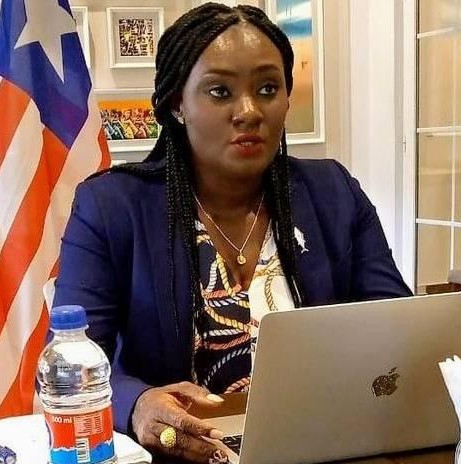

Director General & CEO, National Fisheries and Aquaculture Authority
- In office February 2018 – March 2025

Personal details
- Born: Emma Cathrine Metieh; 17 April 1985 (age 41) Monrovia, Liberia
- Education: University of Liberia, World Maritime University
- Occupation: Administrator

Emma Metieh Glassco (born April 17, 1985) is a fisheries and maritime expert. She served as the director general and chief executive officer of the National Fisheries and Aquaculture Authority following her appointment in 2018 by President George Weah. She is known for her contributions to Liberia’s fisheries sector, including regulatory reforms, revenue generation, and advocacy for women in maritime and fisheries governance.

== Early life and education ==
Emma was born in Monrovia, Liberia. She obtained a Bachelor of Science (BSc) in Zoology from the University of Liberia. She later earned a Master of Science (MSc) degree in Ocean Sustainability, Governance, and Management from the World Maritime University in Malmö, Sweden.

Additionally, she holds diplomas in Ocean Governance and Sustainable Fisheries Management from the Australian National University, Canberra, and training at Rhodes University in Mauritius. She completed an internship at the International Maritime Organization (IMO) headquarters in London, United Kingdom, researching illegal, unreported, and unregulated (IUU) fishing.

== Career ==
Metieh-Glassco began her career as a volunteer at the Ministry of Agriculture in Liberia and subsequently worked as a Fisheries Consultant at the West Africa Regional Fisheries Project under the Ministry of Agriculture.

National Fisheries and Aquaculture Authority

In February 2018, she was appointed by President George Manneh Weah as the first director general and CEO of NaFAA, Liberia’s regulatory body for fisheries and aquaculture. In this role, she is responsible for regulating all fisheries activities, including aquaculture, and maximizing revenue for the national budget. Under her leadership, Liberia’s fisheries sector was reformed through legal frameworks such as the 2019 Fisheries Law and the 2020 Fisheries Regulation, and through ratification of international protocols, including the FAO Port State Measures Agreement. She has also focused on international engagement, attracting investments, and strengthening Liberia’s presence in global fisheries governance. She serves as Chairman/President of the Fisheries Commission for the West Central Gulf of Guinea (FCWC), promoting regional cooperation for sustainable fisheries management.

== Advocacy and leadership ==
Metieh-Glassco is an advocate for women in the maritime and fisheries sectors. In 2019, she established the Liberia chapter of Women in Maritime Africa (WIMAFRICA) and served as its first president. During her studies in Sweden, she also served as president of the World Maritime University Women’s Association (WMUWA) from 2016 to 2017.

== Controversy ==
In 2023, Metieh-Glassco was called by the Liberia Anti-Corruption Commission over alleged corruption related to her tenure at NaFAA. Following her suspension, she filed a $10 million lawsuit against the Government of Liberia at the ECOWAS Court, claiming that her fundamental human rights, particularly her right to due process and a fair trial, were violated during the process. After months of investigation she was officially cleared of any wrongdoing in March 2026 by the Liberia Anti-Corruption Commission.
