= International Maritime Solid Bulk Cargoes Code =

IMO standard for carrying solid cargoes, except grain, in bulk

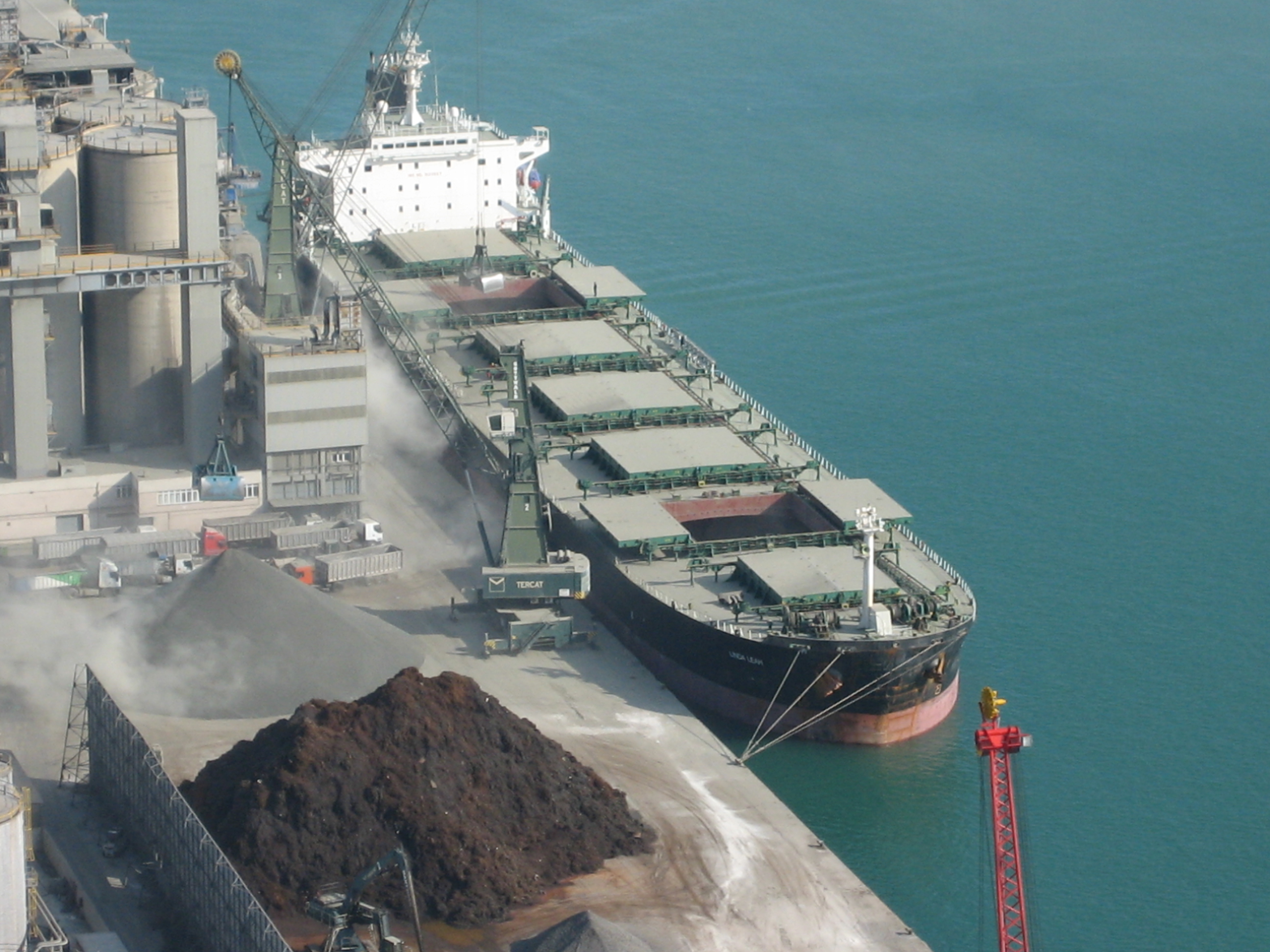
Bulk Cargo transfer operations with Linda Leah, Barcelona 2006

The International Maritime Solid Bulk Cargoes Code (IMSBC Code) is the International Maritime Organization (IMO) standard for the safe carriage of bulk cargoes, primarily transported on bulk carriers. The Code is mandatory under SOLAS Chapter VI. The Code does however not cover the carriage of grain in bulk which is instead regulated for shipping under the International Code for the Safe Carriage of Grain in Bulk.

== History ==
The IMSBC Code was adopted on 4 December 2008, by IMO resolution MSC.268(85). It entered into force on 1 January 2011.

The IMSBC Code is amended every 2 years. Amendments in January 2015 and January 2017 included additional safeguards for the use cargoes that may liquefy, which must be carefully monitored and whose Transportable Moisture Limit (TML) must not be exceeded. In June 2023, the Code was updated by the 07-23 amendments, which become mandatory on 1 January 2025. The amendments included a list of new cargoes scheduled within the Code.

== Content ==
The Code is designed to minimise the dangers to ship from carrying solid bulk cargoes. It provides information on the dangers of cargo, as well as procedures for loading and unloading of cargoes. Cargoes are categorized according to three cargo groups: A, B and C. Group A refers to cargoes that may liquefy. Group B refers to cargoes with chemical hazards and group C refers to generally hazardous cargoes that are not A or B. Shippers are required to complete a cargo declaration form.

Cargoes covered under the Code include substances such as coal, Ores including bauxite, sulphur, direct reduced iron, fertilisers (including Ammonium nitrate, sugar and wood pellets.

=== BLU Code ===
A supplement to the IMSBC Code is the Code of Practice for Safe Loading and Unloading of Bulk Carriers (BLU Code). Within the BLU Code is a manual for the safe unloading and loading of bulk cargoes for terminal representatives.
