= Igor Ponomarev =

Russian diplomat

Igor Maratovich Ponomaryov (Russian: Игорь Маратович Пономарёв; 6 June 1965, Leningrad — 30 October 2006, London), was the Permanent Representative of the Russian Federation to the International Maritime Organization (IMO) and Chairman of the Maritime Safety Committee since 2003. He was also a Governor of the World Maritime University in Malmö, Sweden, and he served as Chairman of the Council of the International Association of Classification Societies (IACS) from 2001 to 2002.

Since 1993 Ponomarev was involved with the development of the Russian Federation's participation in IMO's activities. He chaired the Maritime Safety Committee Working Groups on Tanker Safety and Bulk Carrier Safety from 1999 to 2002.

From 2003 to 2005 he was Chairman of the Sub-Committee on Ship Design and Equipment. Ponomarev chaired the Technical Committee of IMO's 24th Assembly at the end of 2005. In 2005 he was elected Chairman of the Maritime Safety Committee by acclamation.

== Background ==
Ponomarev graduated from St. Petersburg State Maritime Technical University as a naval architect and joined the Russian Maritime Register of Shipping in 1988, where he served first as a Senior Surveyor, then as Principal Surveyor/Co-ordinator for IMO-related activities, later as Head of the International Department and, subsequently, from 1999 to 2003, as Vice Director-General of Russian Maritime Register of Shipping.

== Death ==
Mr. Ponomarev died at the age of 41 in London. He complained of thirst after a night at the opera and then collapsed. International Maritime Organization called his death "sudden". Paolo Guzzanti called the death a possible murder. Ponomarev had been set to meet with Mario Scaramella, a lawyer investigating the FSB, before he died. Scaramella also met with ex-FSB agent Alexander Litvinenko, who was poisoned two days after Ponomarev's death.
