= Convention on Facilitation of International Maritime Traffic =

The Convention on Facilitation of International Maritime Traffic, often abbreviated and referred to as the Fal Convention, is an International Maritime Organization (IMO) Convention for the facilitation of maritime transport and ships. It aims to harmonise communications and information exchange between ships, governments and ports.

== History ==
The Convention was established in April 1965. It entered into force on 5 March 1967 following the necessary ratifications. It was amended in 1992 and again in 2003 to introduce requirements for stowaways.

On 1 January 2018, the Convention was amended to strengthen requirements applying to stowaways and to shore leave for seafarers.

In May 2022, the Convention was amended.

== Contents and application ==
The FAL Convention sets out international standards and recommended practices for the simplification of national formalities, information requirements and procedures for the arrival of ships in territorial waters, as well as their stay and departure.

The Convention sets out regulations and guidance for the management of stowaways on ships and in ports. The FAL Convention defines stowaways as "A person who is secreted on a ship, or in cargo which is subsequently loaded on the ship, without the consent of the shipowner or the Master or any other responsible person and who is detected on board the ship after it has departed from a port, or in the cargo while unloading it in the port of arrival, and is reported as a stowaway by the Master to the appropriate authorities."

The Convention also requires that member States should facilitate shore leave access for seafarers in their ports.

Since 2019 it is now mandatory for all ships and ports to exchange declarations and information electronically.

Since 1 January 2024, the use of the 'Maritime Single Window' (MSW) system is mandatory in all ports, removing all paper-based requirements for information exchange. The Maritime Single Window is a digital platform allowing for the electronic exchange of information.

== FAL Committee ==
The IMO Facilitation Committee (FAL) meets at periodical intervals each year to discuss and review application of the convention. For example, the Committee had its 48th session in April 2024 and discussed the maritime single window system, the impact of maritime autonomous ships, guidelines on port community systems and digitisation initiatives.

The Committee assists member States with the implementation of the Maritime Single Window platform and issues appropriate guidelines.
