= Efthymios Mitropoulos =

Secretary-General of the International Maritime Organization from 2004 to 2011

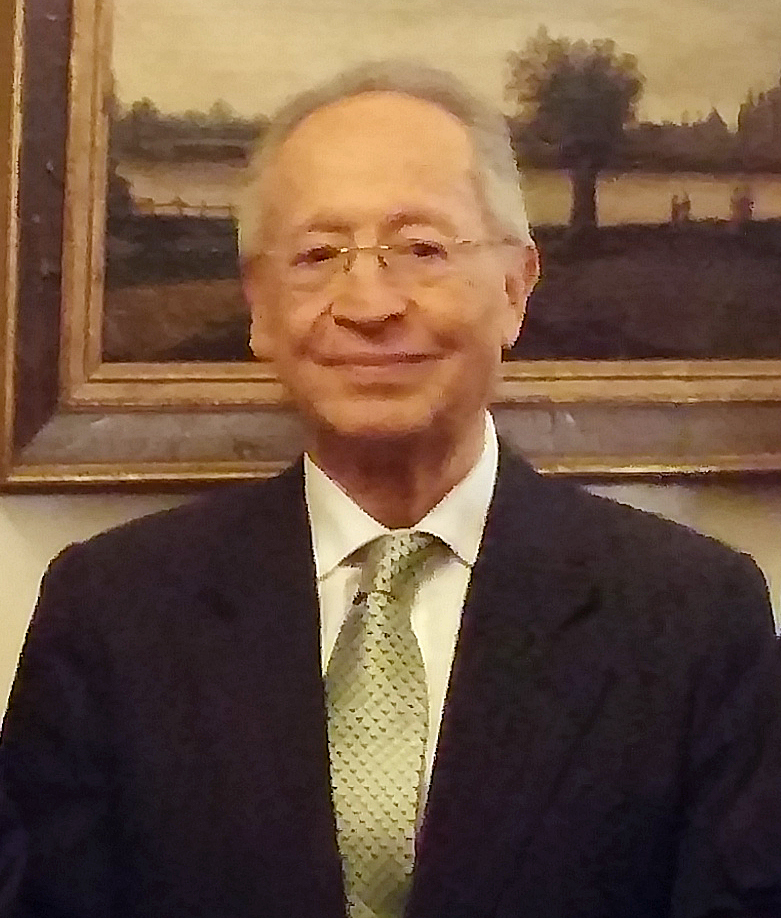
- Efthymios Mitropoulos in 2015

7th Secretary General of the International Maritime Organization
- In office January 1, 2004 – December 31, 2011
- Preceded by: William A. O'Neil
- Succeeded by: Koji Sekimizu

Personal details
- Born: 30 May 1939 (age 87) Piraeus, Greece
- Education: Merchant Marine Academy

Efthymios (Thimio) E. Mitropoulos (Greek: Ευθύμιος Μητρόπουλος; born 30 May 1939 in Piraeus, Greece) was the seventh Secretary-General of the International Maritime Organization (IMO), a United Nations agency. Mitropoulos was elected as Secretary-General on 18 June 2003 during the 19th session of the International Maritime Organization Council. His four-year term started on 1 January 2004, and then was extended until 31 December 2011 by the IMO Council on 9 November 2006. He was succeeded by Koji Sekimizu.

Mitropoulos was an accomplished chief engineer officer, coast guard officer, rear admiral, shipping economist, marine technologist, harbor master, lecturer, chancellor, chairman, and author of books about shipping economics and policy, merchant vessels, and navigation safety, among other shipping-related subjects.

== Biography ==
=== Family background ===
Mitropoulos's father was a merchant navy chief engineer officer and a mother was the daughter of a shipmaster and owner of brigantines and schooners. Mitropoulos is the husband of Chantal Byvoet, with whom he had two children, namely Elias and Athina Mitropoulos.

=== Educational background ===
He received secondary education from the St. Paul French College in the city of Piraeus in Greece. He studied at the Aspropyrgos Merchant Marine Academy in Athens at Attica from 1957 to 1959. After his apprenticeship on board merchant ships from 1959 to 1962, Mitropoulos studied at the Hellenic Coast Guard Academy from 1962 to 1964.

=== Career ===
After studying at the Hellenic Coast Guard Academy in 1964, Mitropoulos practiced as a Coast Guard Officer in Corfu then in Piraeus, retiring as a Rear Admiral. He studied shipping economics in Italy in 1965, then marine technology in the United Kingdom in 1970. He started his career as a member of the Greek delegation in 1966. Among his achievement included the laying down of the foundation for establishing the Joint Maritime and Aeronautical Search and Rescue Centre of Greece. He was the harbor master of Corfu from 1977 to 1979.

He began his career at the International Maritime Organization in January 1979. He held positions such as Implementation Officer of the Maritime Safety Division (1979), Head of the Navigation Section (1985), Senior Deputy Director for Navigation and Related Matters (1989), Director of the Maritime Safety Division (1992), Secretary of the Maritime Safety Committee (1992), Assistant Secretary-General (2000), and as Secretary-General beginning 2004. His first tenure was from 2004 to 2008. His second term began in 2008 and was completed in December 2011. He also acted as Chancellor of the World Maritime University in Sweden (2004) and as Governing Board Chairman of the International Maritime Law Institute in Malta (2004). Mitropoulos currently serves as Patron of the ITF Seafarers' Trust.

== Awards ==
He received multiple awards and recognitions during his career for his achievements. Among them was for being the author of the book Tankers: Evolution and technical issues, which won him the first prize during the Year of Shipping panhellenic competition in 1969. In 2011 Mitropoulos was awarded the International Maritime Prize for his contribution to the work of the International Maritime Organization. In 2012, he was appointed as Honorary Knight Commander of the Order of St Michael and St George for services to international maritime safety, security and protection of the marine environment. In 2013 he received an Honorary Doctorate from the World Maritime University in Malmö, Sweden.
