= International Code for the Construction and Equipment of Ships carrying Dangerous Chemicals in Bulk =

Maritime transport standard

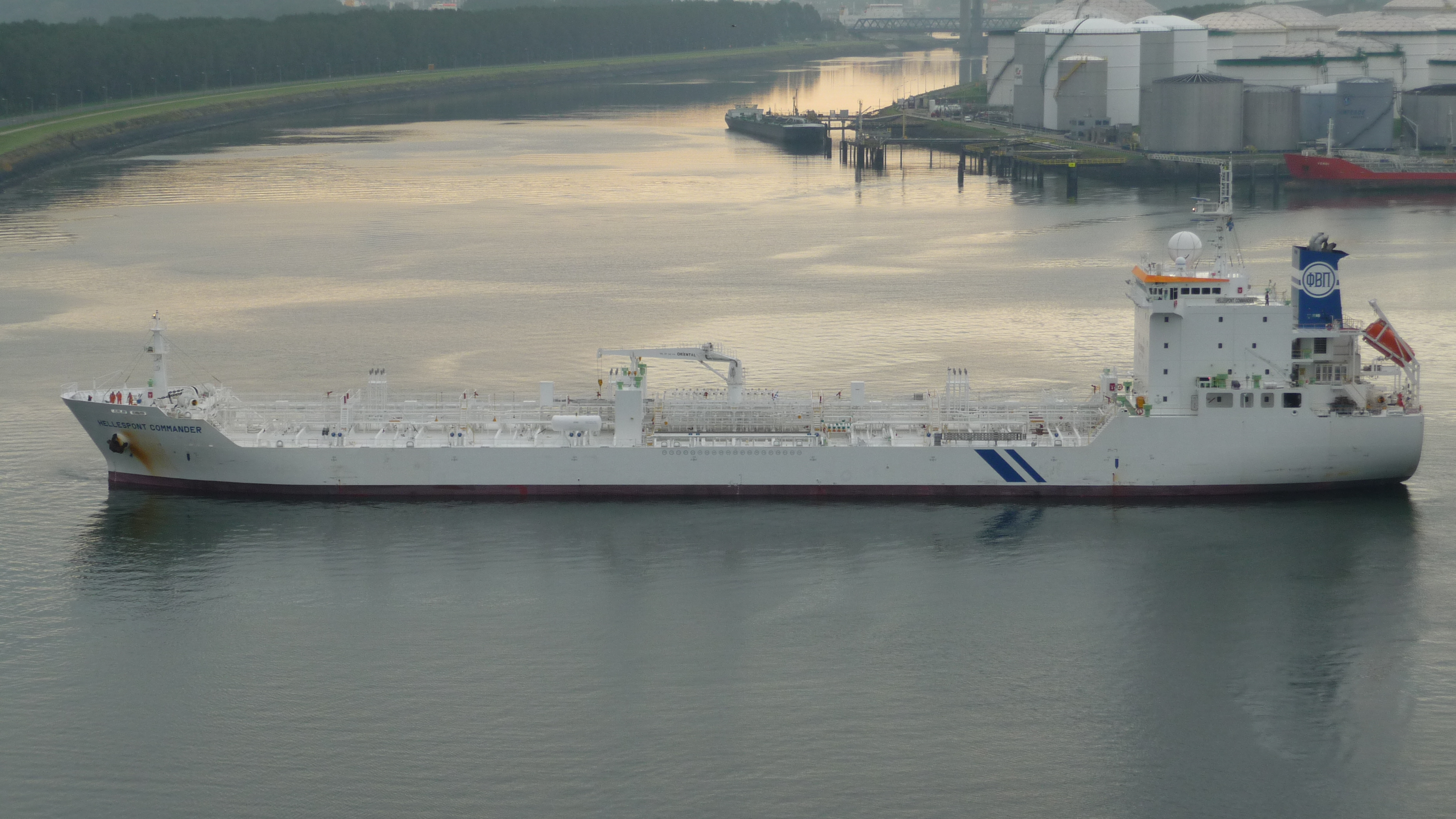
Chemical tanker Hellespont Commander manoeuvring in Caland Canal

The International Code for the Construction and Equipment of Ships carrying Dangerous Chemicals in Bulk, often referred and abbreviated as the IBC Code, is the International Maritime Organization (IMO) standard for the carriage of chemicals as cargo in maritime transport.

== Content and application ==
The Code applies to chemical tankers built on or after 1 July 1986. Prior to 1986, ships were covered under the Code for the Construction and Equipment of Ships Carrying Dangerous Chemicals in Bulk (BCH Code).

The Code covers how liquid chemicals must be transported in bulk and applies to substances listed in MARPOL Annex II. It includes requirements that govern the design, construction, and outfitting of new build or converted chemical tankers. Chapter 17 of the IBC Code lists each product and its carriage requirements, including ship type, tank type, pollution category, ventilation, environmental and fire safety considerations as well as additional specific requirements for toxicity, heat sensitivity, water reactivity and risk of polymerization.

Ships are designated under the Code according to three ship types: type 1, 2 or 3, with type 1 ships transporting the most severe environmental and safety hazardous chemicals. The Code requires that the ship can withstand damage according to certain design requirements based on type and length.

Ships are required to possess a Certificate of Fitness that sets out what cargoes the chemical tanker can load, carry at sea and discharge.

== Amendments ==
In 2004, the Code was amended to keep it consistent with MARPOL, and the amendments entered into force on 1 January 2007.

In 2019 amendments to the IBC Code were adopted by the IMO under Resolutions MSC.460(101) and MEPC.318(74). These entered into force on 1 January 2021, and revised Chapters 17 and 18 of the code. The amendments applied to new and existing ships which have IBC Code Certificates of Fitness and Noxious Liquid Substances Certificates.

Cargoes in the code under Chapter 18 (list of products to which the code does not apply) moved to Chapter 17, meaning they are not allowed to be carried on tankers not having a Certificate of Fitness. These cargoes are now assigned MARPOL Annex II pollution category Z.
