= J. William Kime =

19th Commandant of the United States Coast Guard

John William Kime
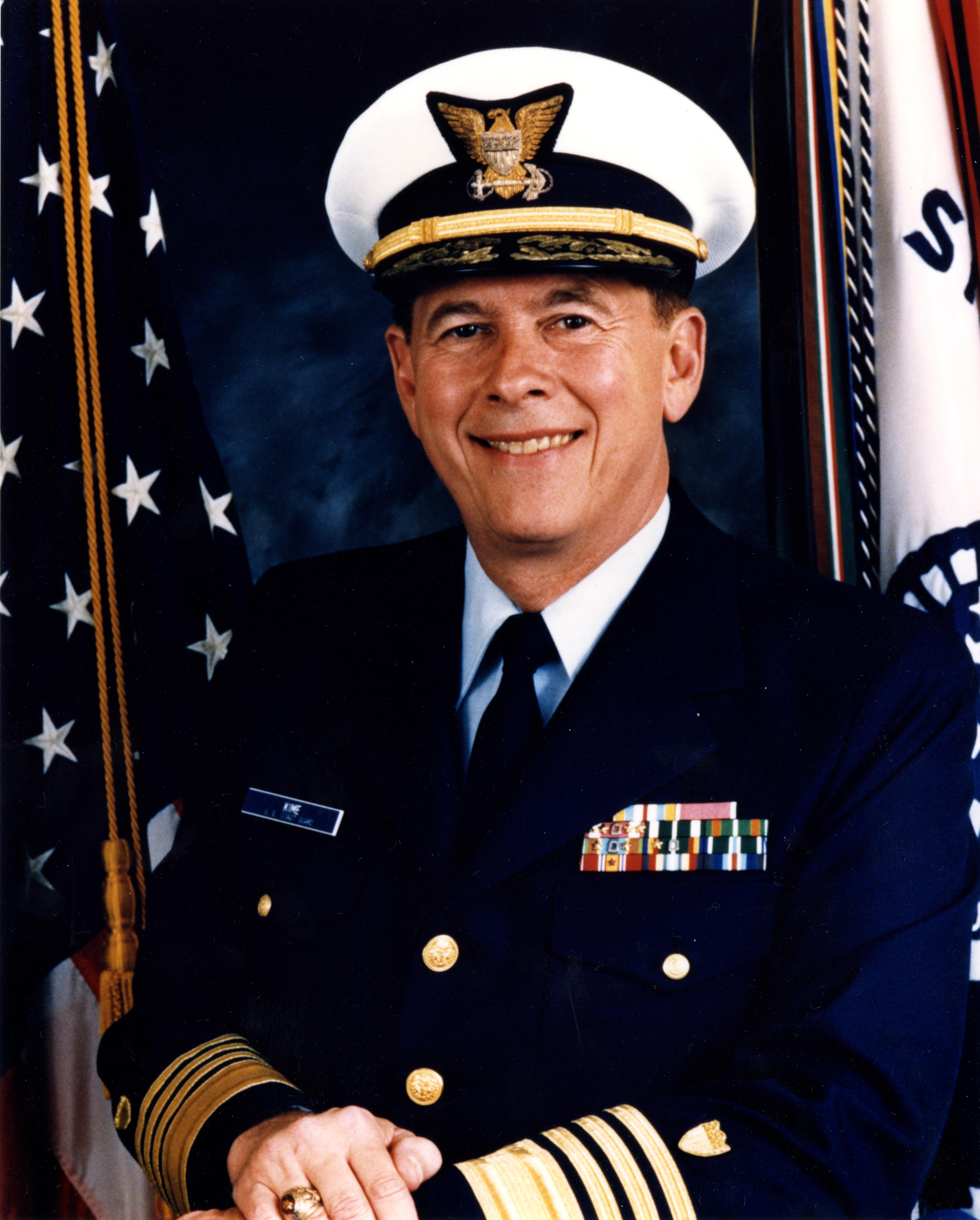
- Born: 15 July 1934; Greensboro, North Carolina, U.S.
- Died: 14 September 2006 (aged 72); Towson, Maryland, U.S.
- Burial place: Arlington National Cemetery
- Military career
- Branch: United States Coast Guard
- Service years: 1953–1994
- Rank: Admiral
- Commands: Commandant of the Coast Guard; USCGC Midgett (WHEC-726)
- Conflicts: Gulf War
- Awards: Transportation Distinguished Service Medal; Coast Guard Distinguished Service Medal; Defense Superior Service Medal; Legion of Merit; Joint Service Commendation Medal; Coast Guard Commendation Medal

John William Kime (15 July 1934 – 14 September 2006) was an admiral of the United States Coast Guard who served as the 19th commandant from 1990 to 1994.

== Early life and career ==
Kime was born in Greensboro, North Carolina. At the age of 10, he moved with his family to Baltimore, Maryland. In 1951, he graduated from Baltimore City College, and was accepted into the School of Pharmacy at the University of Maryland, but declined the admission offer for financial reasons.

Soon thereafter, he accepted a job at the local General Motors plant, installing glove boxes in Chevrolets. The following year, he saw a television advertisement on Coast Guard careers, which inspired him to enroll at the United States Coast Guard Academy in New London, Connecticut.

In 1957, Kime graduated second in his academy class. Upon graduation, he served aboard USCGC Casco before assuming command of LORAN Station Wake Island in 1960. Continuing his education, he graduated from the Massachusetts Institute of Technology with a master's degree in naval architecture and marine engineering and the professional degree of naval engineer in 1964. He also was in charge of the structural design of the Polar-class icebreakers and was the first engineer officer on USCGC Boutwell, home ported in Boston, Massachusetts. In 1977, he became a distinguished graduate of the Industrial College of the Armed Forces and was assigned to headquarters as assistant chief of the Merchant Marine Technical Division. His other assignments included command of Marine Safety Office Baltimore in 1978–81, deputy chief of the Office of Marine Environment and Systems, 1981–82; chief of the Seventh Coast Guard District Operations Division, 1982–84; chief of Headquarters Office of Marine Safety, Security, and Environmental Protection, 1986–1988.

Prior to becoming Coast Guard commandant, he served as commander of the Long Beach, California-based 11th Coast Guard District and Pacific Regional Coordinator for the Office of National Drug Control Policy. It is noteworthy that Kime was promoted from rear admiral (a two-star rank) to admiral (a four-star rank), never having held the three-star rank of vice admiral.

== Commandant ==
As commandant, Kime was passionate about maritime safety and environmental protection issues, and oversaw implementation of the landmark Oil Pollution Act of 1990 in the wake of the Exxon Valdez oil spill, he pioneered how the Coast Guard prevents and responds to oil and hazardous chemical spills, significantly minimizing environmental damage. The groundwork he laid can also be seen in how the Coast Guard responds to a broad range of threats and hazards to maritime, homeland, and national security interests. His vision set the stage for the Coast Guard's transition to focused organizational competencies in prevention and response. He led the service during the end of the Cold War, collapse of communism, Operation Desert Shield and Operation Desert Storm, as well as increasing operations in traditional mission areas and established the position of Drug Interdiction Coordinator.

Kime oversaw the Coast Guard's response to the Haitian refugee crisis following the 1991 Haitian coup d'etat. Known as Operation Able Manner, the effort to turn around Haitian refugee boats involved multiple government agencies operating just outside of Haiti's territorial waters and up to the Bahamas. In January 1993 he said the Coast Guard expected as many as 200,000 refugees to attempt to reach the US by crossing the Caribbean in small boats.

== Later life ==
Upon his retirement from the Coast Guard in 1994, Kime brought his leadership to the maritime industry, serving as the chief executive officer of management companies in the United States, United Kingdom, Norway and Sweden. Until 2005, he served as the U.S. representative to the Baltic and International Maritime Council (BIMCO), the world's largest private shipping organization.

He died of cancer in Towson, Maryland, on 14 September 2006 at age 72. A memorial service was held at the Fort Myer Memorial Chapel in Arlington, Virginia, on 29 September followed by interment in Arlington National Cemetery on Coast Guard Hill.

Sources: ALCOAST 464/06 (R 142239Z SEP 06), ALCOAST 469/06 06 (R 152010Z SEP 06), ALCOAST 475/06 (R 202141Z 6 SEP), and L.A. Times obituaries, 20 September 2006.

== Awards and decorations ==
Kime received the following awards and decorations:

- Transportation Distinguished Service Medal
- Coast Guard Distinguished Service Medal
- Defense Superior Service Medal
- Legion of Merit
- Meritorious Service Medals with "O" device with four gold Award stars
- Coast Guard Commendation Medal
- Coast Guard Achievement Medal
- Commandant's Letter of Commendation Ribbons with "O" device with two gold Award stars
- Coast Guard Unit Commendation with "O" device one gold Award star
- Coast Guard Meritorious Unit Commendation
- International Maritime Prize

Military offices
| Preceded by Paul A. Yost Jr. | Commandant of the Coast Guard; 1990–1994 | Succeeded by Robert E. Kramek |
