= International Maritime Rescue Federation =

International non-governmental organisation

- Formation: 1924; 102 years ago
- Type: NGO
- Registration no.: 1100883
- Legal status: charity
- Headquarters: London, UK
- Region served: Worldwide
- Members: 130 (2023)
- Board Chair: Jacob Tas
- CEO: Caroline Jupe
- Website: www.international-maritime-rescue.org
- Formerly called: International Lifeboat Federation (ILF)

The International Maritime Rescue Federation (IMRF) is an international non-governmental organisation (NGO) that supports search and rescue (SAR Convention) organisations in developing and improving maritime SAR capacity. The IMRF provides guidance, facilitates training, and enables search and rescue providers to share expertise.

== History ==
In 1924, the first International Lifeboat Conference was held in London, England, to commemorate the 100th anniversary of the Royal National Lifeboat Institution (RNLI). The conference was attended by representatives from seven of the world’s lifeboat organisations. Attendees agreed to establish an International Lifeboat Federation (ILF) to promote, represent, and support sea rescue services worldwide. In 1985, the ILF was formally registered as a "non-governmental consultative organisation" by the International Maritime Organization (IMO), the United Nations specialised agency for international maritime affairs.

At the time of the 1924 conference — before modern radio communications or rescue helicopters were commonly used — coastal maritime rescue was usually provided by small rescue craft operated by local communities. These vessels were referred to as "lifeboats," a term that predated its now-common association with emergency evacuation craft carried on larger ships.

Technological advancements led to the development of maritime rescue operations. Many developed countries now operate centralised maritime rescue co-ordination centres, which receive maritime distress calls and coordinate response efforts using modern communication systems, satellite positioning technologies, and search planning software. Rescue responses may include surface vessels, rescue helicopters, fixed-wing search aircraft and casualty treatment and recovery.

The ILF contributed to the development of the IMO's Global Search and Rescue Plan following the adoption of the 1979 SAR Convention, as well as the evolution of the Global Maritime Distress Safety System. In 1998, the ILF became the first organisation to receive the IMO’s International Maritime Prize.

To reflect modern maritime rescue activities carried out by its member organisations — and to avoid confusion with the use of the term "lifeboat" for evacuation craft — the International Lifeboat Federation changed its name to the International Maritime Rescue Federation (IMRF) in 2003, with the transition completed in 2007.

On 27 September 2023, Vice Admiral Sir Timothy Laurence, brother-in-law of King Charles III, was appointed patron of the IMRF.

== Operation ==
The IMRF has close to 140 members in over 50 countries. The organisation has consultative status at the International Maritime Organization (IMO).

The IMRF's activities include addressing issues in the international maritime SAR sector, such as its #SARyouOK? mental health initiative, the Mass Rescue Operations (MRO) guidance project, and the #FutureSAR climate change initiative. It has surveyed women in SAR.

The board of trustees is responsible for agreeing the IMRF's strategy and has overall control of the charity. The trustees are elected for four-year terms by member organisations at the Quadrennial General Meeting, which takes place in conjunction with the World Maritime Rescue Congress. The most recent World Maritime Rescue Congress was held in Rotterdam, Netherlands, in June 2023.

From 2017 to 2023 the chief executive officer was Theresa Crossley; in 2023 Caroline Jupe was appointed to the post.
