= William A. O'Neil =

Canadian civil servant

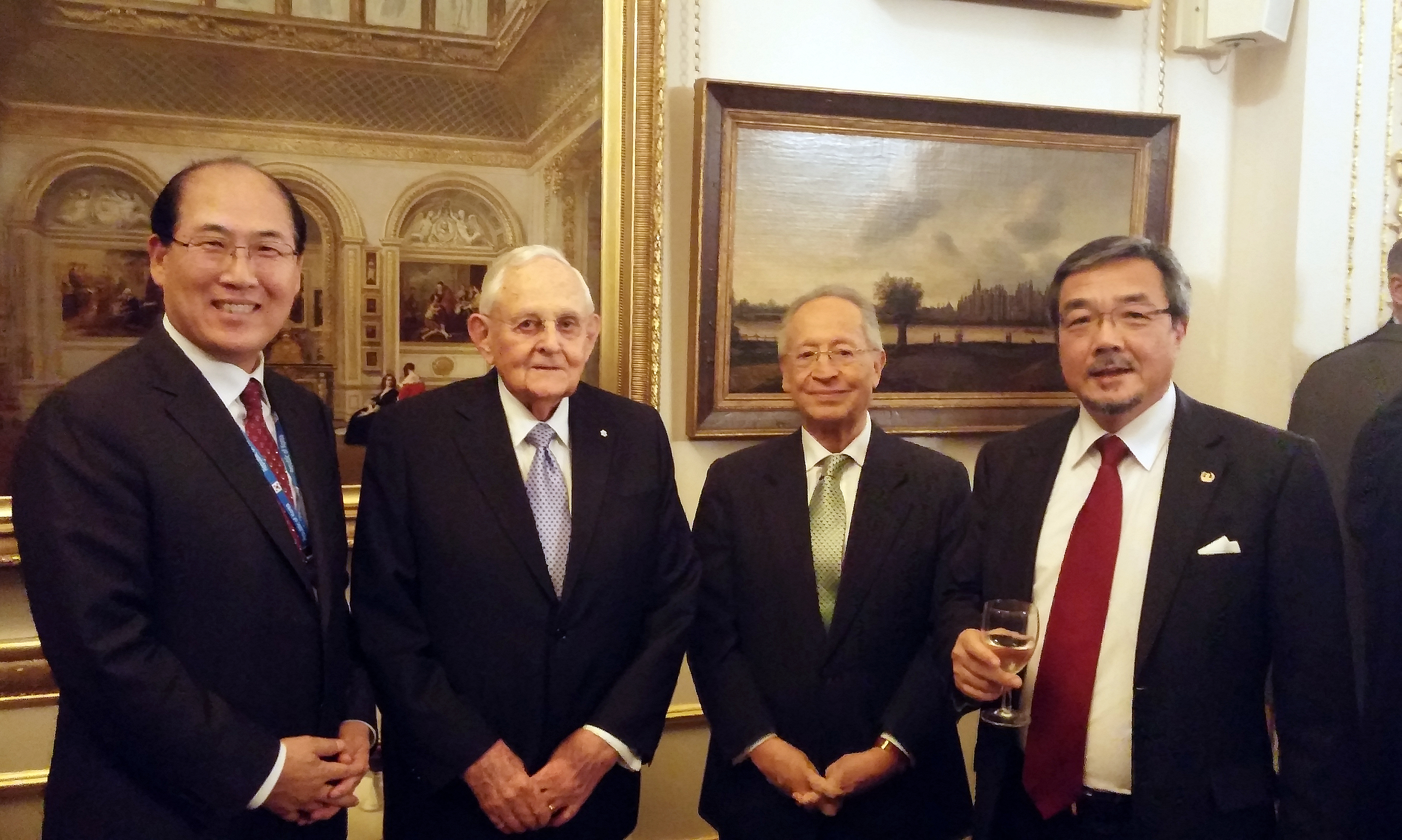
- O'Neil (second from left) in 2015

6th Secretary General of the International Maritime Organization
- In office January 1, 1990 – December 31, 2003
- Preceded by: Chandrika Prasad Srivastava
- Succeeded by: Efthymios Mitropoulos

Personal details
- Education: University of Toronto

William A. O'Neil (June 6, 1927 - October 29, 2020) was a Canadian civil servant who served as Secretary-General of the International Maritime Organization and also served as Chancellor of the World Maritime University. He was the second-longest serving IMO Secretary-General.

== Early life ==
O'Neil was born in Ottawa in 1927. In 1949, O'Neil obtained a degree in civil engineering from the University of Toronto.

== Career ==
In his early career, O'Neil worked at the Canadian Department of Transport. From 1975 to 1980, he was Commissioner of the Canadian Coast Guard. Between 1980 and 1989 he was employed as Chief Executive Officer of the St. Lawrence Seaway. During this period, he also represented Canada on the IMO Council.

In 1990, O'Neil was elected as the 6th Secretary-General of IMO. He served as Secretary-General for three and a half terms until 31 December 2003. In 1991, he became Chancellor of the World Maritime University and Chairman of the Governing Board of the International Maritime Law Institute.

While Secretary-General, the IMO made several major decisions with a large impact on shipping. He helped to address key safety issues in shipping including the safety of bulk carriers, passenger ships and Roll-on/roll-off ferries. He oversaw the adoption of Annex VI of the MARPOL Convention in 1997 as well as the development of the International Safety Management Code. Following the September 11 attacks in 2001, he was also responsible for the IMO approach that led to the International Ship and Port Facility Security Code.

O'Neil died on 29 October 2020 at age 93. In November 2022, the IMO Secretary-General Kitack Lim paid tribute to O'Neil at the IMO, along with the release of a video tribute.
