= Koji Sekimizu =

Japanese official

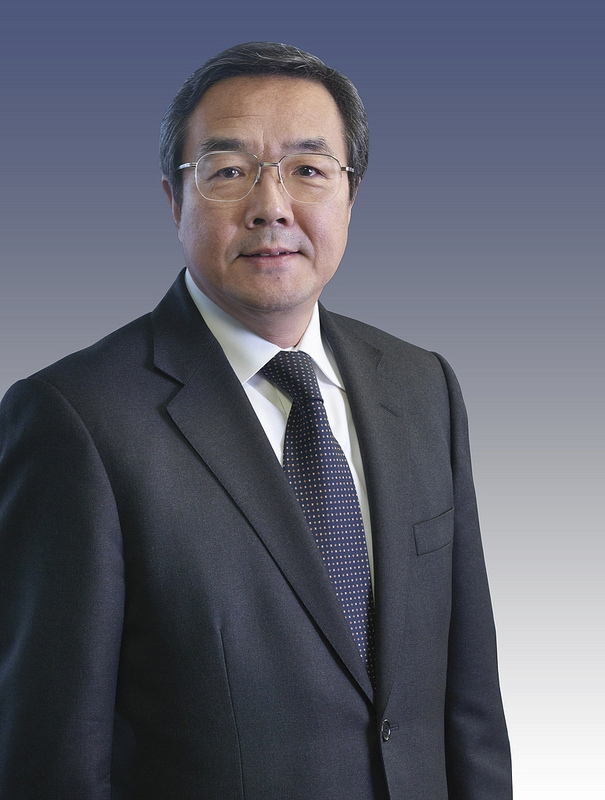
- Koji Sekimizu in April 2013

8th Secretary General of the International Maritime Organization
- In office January 1, 2012 – December 31, 2015
- Preceded by: Efthymios Mitropoulos
- Succeeded by: Kitack Lim

Personal details
- Born: December 3, 1952 (age 73)
- Education: Osaka University

Koji Sekimizu (born 3 December 1952) is a Japanese official who was Secretary General of the International Maritime Organization between 2012 and 2015, as well as Chancellor of the World Maritime University.

== Education ==
Sekimizu attended school in Yokohama. He studied a Bachelor's degree in Engineering at Osaka University and then obtained a Master's degree in Engineering from Osaka University in 1977.

== Early career ==
In 1977, he was appointed at a ship inspectior for the Ministry of Transport in Japan. In 1979, he became responsible for IMO safety planning regulations at the Ministry of Transport Ship Bureau. In 1980, he began attending meetings at the IMO in London. He eventually rose to become Deputy Director of Maritime Safety Standards in 1986.

In 1989, Sekimizu joined the IMO as a technical officer. In 1992, he became Head of Technology in the Maritime Safety Division. In 1997, he became the Senior Deputy Director of the Maritime Environment Division. In 2004, he was appointed as the Director of the Maritime Safety Division at the IMO.

== Secretary-General of the IMO ==
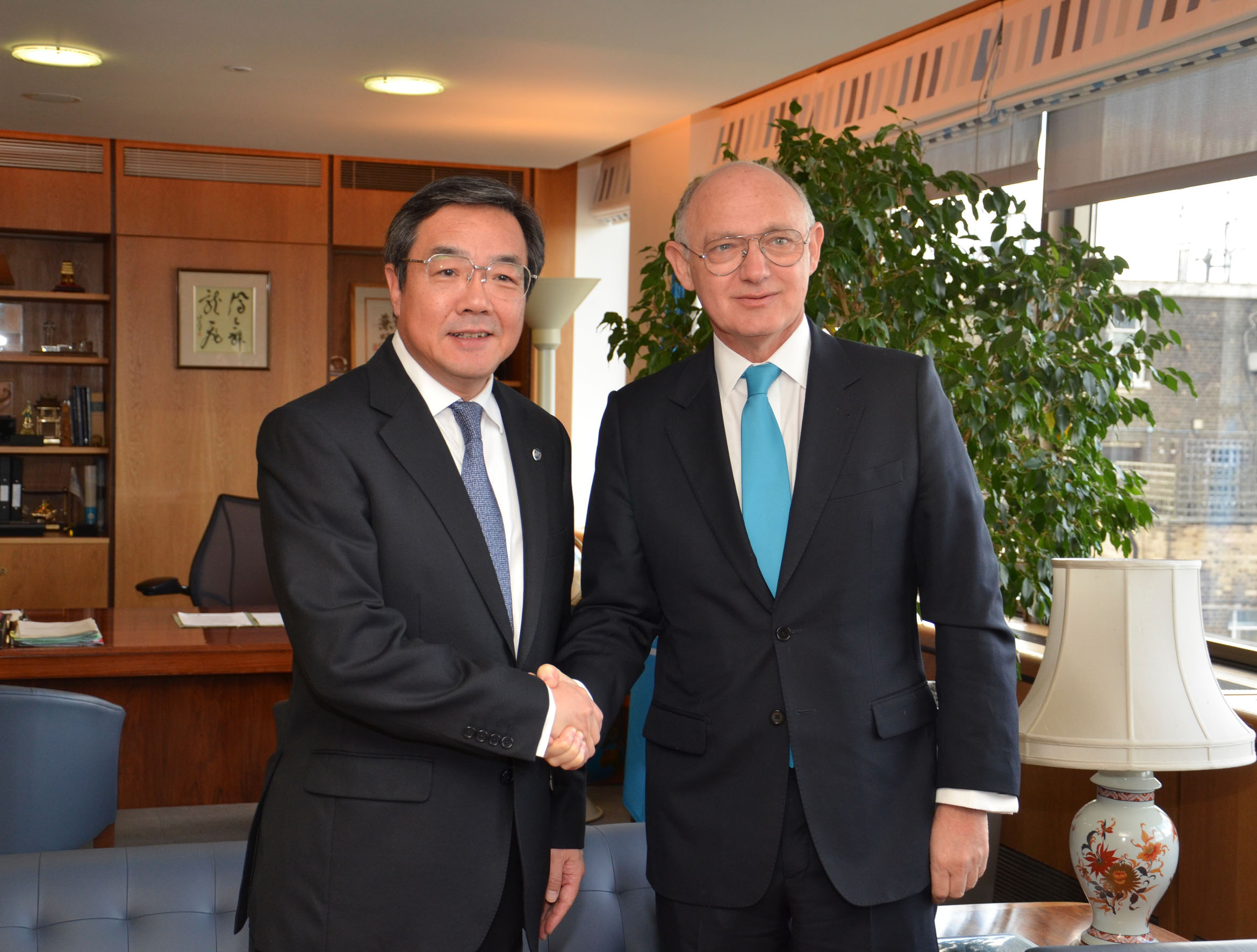
Sekimizu seen at IMO in his office in 2013

On 28 June 2011, he was elected Secretary-General of the International Maritime Organization. This appointment was confirmed on 1 December 2011 and he became the eighth Secretary-General of the IMO. He began his term as Secretary-General on 1 January 2012.

In July 2012, in response to the Costa Concordia disaster, he stated that the IMO needed to seriously consider the lessons to be learnt [from the accident] and, if necessary, re-reexamine the requirements on the safety of large passenger ships. In September 2012, he argued for enhanced safety regulations for passenger shipping in the maritime industry. In June 2013, in Oslo, he advised audiences of the IMO development of the Polar Code.

In 2015, he stated clearly that the IMO must help prevent migrants from being sent to unsafe ports, specifically in the Mediterranean. In 2015, Sekimizu also said that shippers should not be responsible for capping their environmental emissions. In April 2015, he welcomed Zambia as the newest IMO member State.

Seikimizu served as Secretary-General until 31 December 2015. He was succeeded on 1 January 2016 by Kitack Lim. On his retirement from the IMO at the end of 2015, he was the last Japanese official to lead a UN specialised agency until the appointment of Masahiko Metoki to the Universal Postal Union in 2022.

In 2016, following his retirement he received the International Maritime Prize for his contributions at IMO.

== Personal life ==
He is married, with a daughter, son and two grand-daughters.
