= International Code for the Safe Carriage of Grain in Bulk =

The International Code for the Safe Carriage of Grain in Bulk (International Grain Code) is the International Maritime Organization (IMO) standard for the safe carriage of Grain cargoes on ships, primarily transported on Bulk carriers. The Code is mandatory under SOLAS Chapter VI.

== History ==
The Code was adopted on 23 May 1991. It was enacted under IMO Resolution MSC.23 (59).

== Content ==
The Code applies to all ships, irrespective of size involved in the carriage of grain in bulk. Definitions of grain include wheat, maize, oats, rye, barley, pulses, rice and seeds.

The Code covers specific ship stability requirements for grain ships to prevent dangerous stability from the shifting of grain.

Ships are required to be issued with a Document of Authorisation (SOA) and a Grain Loading Manual.
