= Arsenio Domínguez =

10th Secretary-General of the International Maritime Organization

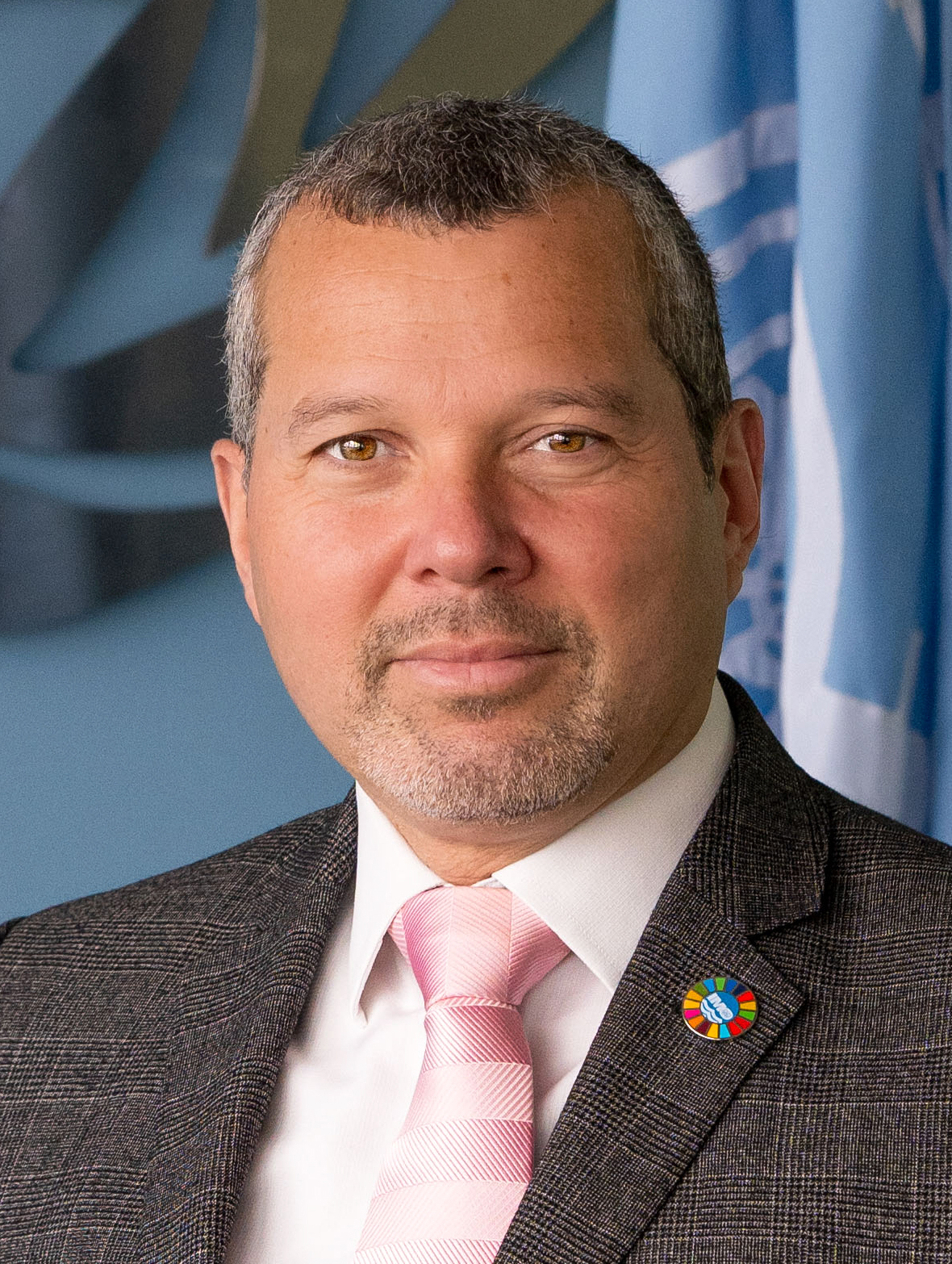
- Domínguez in November 2023

10th Secretary-General of the International Maritime Organization
- Incumbent
- Assumed office 1 January 2024
- Preceded by: Kitack Lim

Personal details
- Born: 18 November 1970 (age 56) Panama City, Panama

Arsenio Antonio Domínguez Velasco (Note: In this name that follows Hispanic American naming customs, the first or paternal surname is Domínguez and the second or maternal family name is Velasco.) (born 18 November 1970) is a Panamanian naval architect and international civil servant. Since 1 January 2024, he is serving an initial four-year term as the Secretary-General of the International Maritime Organization (IMO), a specialized agency of the United Nations.

== Education ==
Arsenio Domínguez was born in Panama City on 18 November 1970. He trained as a naval architect at the University of Veracruz in Mexico. He also has an MBA from the University of Hull and a Certificate of Higher Education in International Law and European Politics from Birkbeck University in the UK.

== Career ==
Domínguez worked as a port engineer in Panama before becoming a Drydock Assistant Manager at the Braswell Shipyard.

From 2004 to 2017, he represented Panama as technical advisor and then Ambassador and Permanent Representative to the International Maritime Organization. During this time he also served as Chair of the Marine Environment Protection Committee (MEPC) from 2014 to 2017.

In 2017, Domínguez assumed the role of Chief of Staff in the Office of the Secretary-General at the International Maritime Organization. Subsequently, he transitioned to the positions of Director of the Administrative Division and Director of the Marine Environment Division.

Domínguez was elected to be the new Secretary-General of the IMO on 18 July 2023. In September 2023, Dominguez informed the London International Shipping Week conference that the IMO had begun reviewing the Carbon Intensity Indicator regulations for shipping.

The new Secretary-General was approved by the IMO Assembly unanimously on 30 November 2023.

=== Secretary-General ===
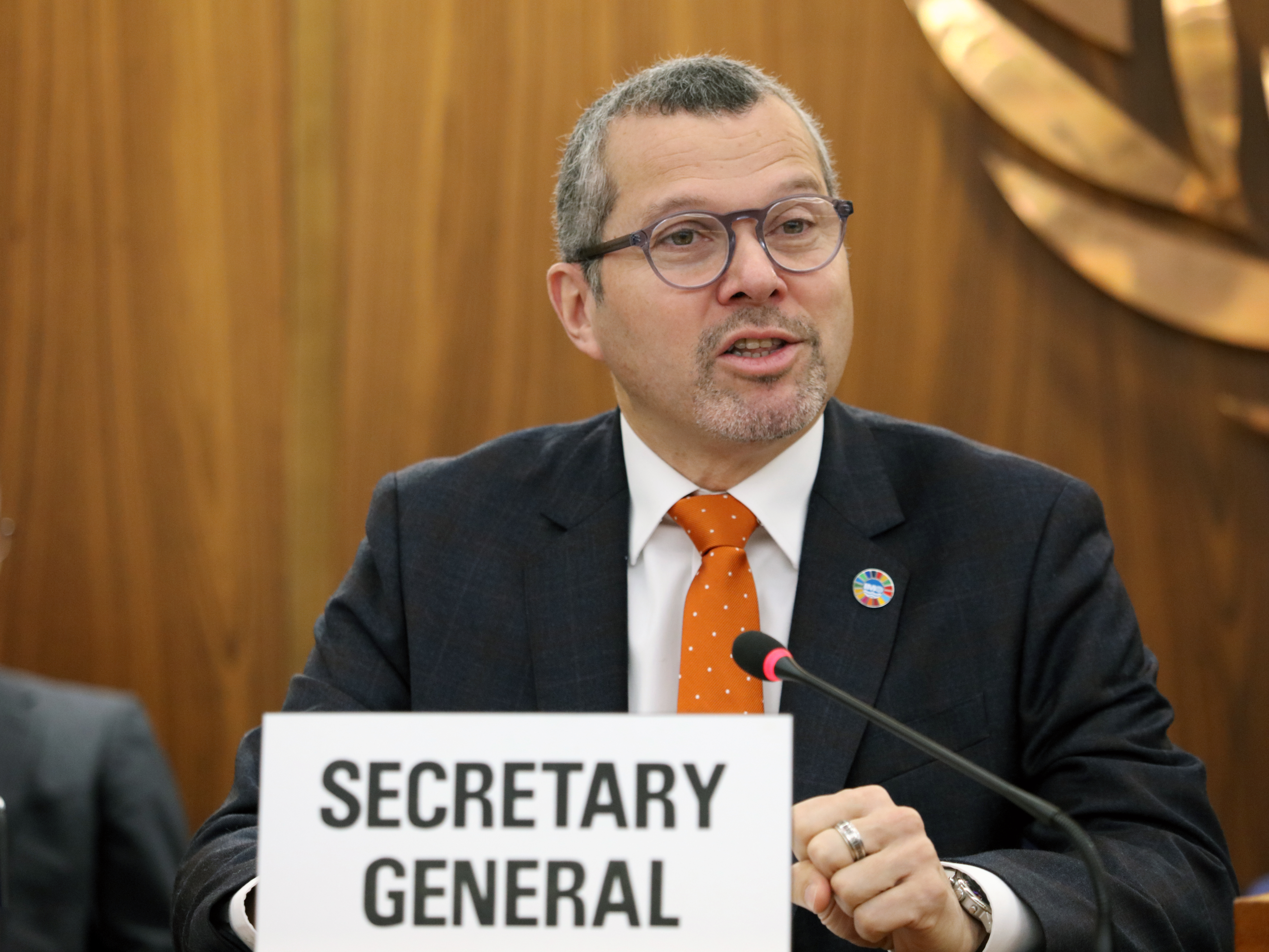
Dominguez speaking at the IMO Sub-Committee on Ship Design and Construction in 2024

Domínguez assumed office as the 10th Secretary-General of the IMO on 1 January 2024 and released a New Year's Message to the shipping industry.

On 3 January 2024, in a speech to the United Nations Security Council, he condemned the Houthi attacks against international shipping in the Red Sea. On 10 January, he announced a new senior leadership at the IMO. On 22 January, Domínguez gave an opening address to the 10th Session of the IMO Sub-Committee on Ship Design and Construction (SDC), calling for the immediate release of the Galaxy Leader and its crew. In February 2024, he called for a de-escalation of tensions which was causing the ongoing attacks in the Red Sea and stated that the IMO were working to facilitate talks on maritime security between relevant parties.

In April 2024, at Singapore Maritime Week, Domínguez stated that the IMO was on track to reach its stated goals in reducing greenhouse emissions according to its planned timeline. In May 2024, at the 108th session of the Maritime Safety Committee (MSC 108), Domínguez opened the session and highlighted the ongoing attacks on shipping and the need to protect seafarers.

In September 2024, he spoke at the launch of the DNV Maritime Forecast event at SMM Hamburg. He called on the maritime industry to maintain faith in the IMO as it continues to lead shipping towards requirements for decarbonisation and environmental protection. Also, in September 2024, he delivered the opening remarks of the 10th session of the IMO Sub-Committee on Carriage of Cargoes and Containers. He urged that ships not be targeted because of politics as conflict endangers the lives of seafarers, as well as threaten international food security.

== Personal life ==
Domínguez enjoys playing tennis and watching horror movies. He states that living near the Panama Canal and the influences of his parents were key factors that encouraged him to seek challenges from a career in the maritime industry.
