= International Maritime Organization =

Specialized agency of the United Nations

Coordinates: 51°29′36″N 0°07′16″W

- Abbreviation: IMO, OMI
- Formation: 17 March 1948; 78 years ago
- Type: United Nations specialized agency
- Legal status: Active
- Headquarters: London, United Kingdom
- Secretary General: Arsenio Dominguez
- Parent organization: United Nations Economic and Social Council
- Website: imo.org

The International Maritime Organization (IMO; French: Organisation maritime internationale, Spanish: Organización Marítima Internacional, OMI) is a specialized agency of the United Nations regulating maritime transport. It was established following agreement at a UN conference held in Geneva in 1948, but it did not come into force for ten years until the new body, then called the Inter-governmental Maritime Consultative Organization, first assembled on 6 January 1959. Headquartered in London, United Kingdom, the IMO has 176 Member States and three Associate Members as of 2025.

The IMO's purpose is to develop and maintain a comprehensive regulatory framework for shipping. Its remit includes maritime safety, environmental concerns, and legal matters. IMO is governed by an assembly of members which meets every two years. Its finance and organization is administered by a council of 40 members elected from the assembly. The work of IMO is conducted through five committees supported by technical subcommittees. Other UN organizations may observe the proceedings of the IMO. Observer status is granted to qualified NGOs.

IMO is supported by a permanent secretariat of employees who are representative of the organization's members. The secretariat is composed of a Secretary-General elected by the assembly, and various divisions such as those for marine safety, environmental protection and a conference section.

== History ==
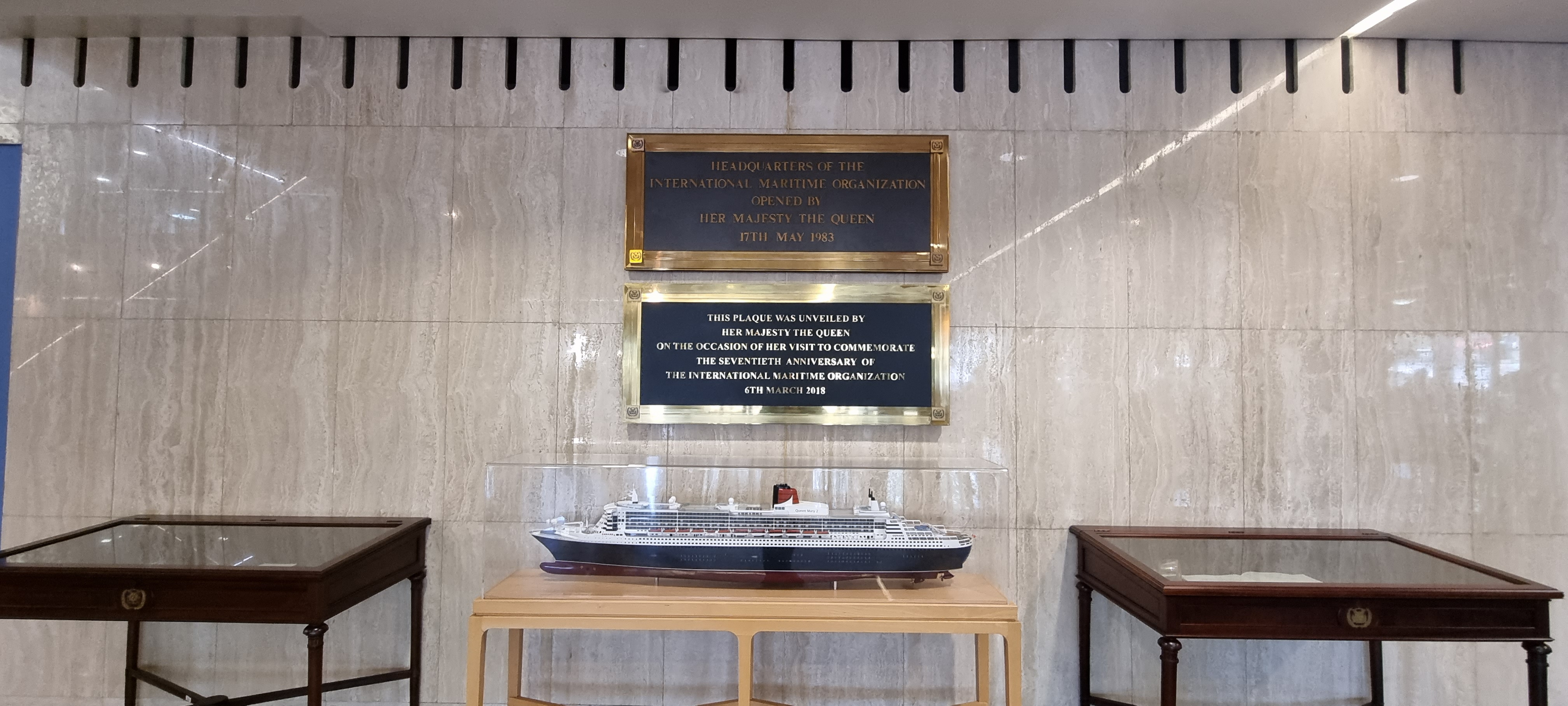
Opening and anniversary plaques of Queen Elizabeth II and model of Queen Mary 2 in the lobby of the IMO Headquarters

In February–March 1948 the United Nations Maritime Conference in Geneva institutionalized the regulation of the safety of shipping into an international framework. Hitherto such international conventions had been initiated piecemeal, notably the Safety of Life at Sea Convention (SOLAS), adopted in 1914 following the Titanic disaster. The conference resolved "that an international organization to be known as the Intergovernmental Maritime Consultative Organization shall be established"; however many countries did not trust the convention, so ratification was slow and it took until March 1958 until it came into force.

The Inter-Governmental Maritime Consultative Organization (IMCO; now using the hyphen) held its first Assembly in London in January 1959. Its initial task was to update the SOLAS; the resulting 1960 International Convention for the Safety of Life at Sea was recast in 1974 and subsequently modified and updated to adapt to changes in safety requirements and technology. Since 1978, every last Thursday of September has been celebrated as World Maritime Day.

When IMCO began its operations in 1959 certain other pre-existing conventions were brought under its aegis, most notably the International Convention for the Prevention of Pollution of the Sea by Oil (OILPOL) from 1954. Under the guidance of IMCO, the convention was amended in 1962, 1969, and 1971.

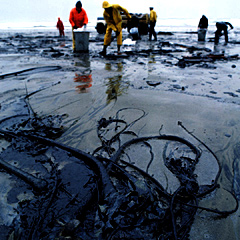
Oil spill on a beach

As oil trade and industry developed, many people in the industry saw a need for further improvements in regards to pollution prevention. This became increasingly apparent in 1967, when the tanker Torrey Canyon ran aground entering the English Channel and spilled record-breaking 120,000 tons of crude oil. This incident prompted a series of new conventions.

IMO held an emergency session of its council to deal with the need to readdress regulations pertaining to maritime pollution. In 1969, the IMO Assembly decided to host an international gathering in 1973 dedicated to this issue. The goal was to develop an international agreement for controlling general environmental contamination by ships when out at sea. During the next few years IMO brought to the forefront a series of measures designed to prevent large ship accidents and to minimize their effects. It also detailed how to deal with the environmental threat caused by routine ship duties such as the cleaning of oil cargo tanks or the disposal of engine room wastes. By tonnage, the aforementioned was a bigger problem than accidental pollution. The most significant development to come out of this conference was the International Convention for the Prevention of Pollution from Ships, 1973 (MARPOL). It covers not only accidental and operational oil pollution but also different types of pollution by chemicals, goods in packaged form, sewage, garbage and air pollution. The original MARPOL was signed on 17 February 1973, but did not come into force due to lack of ratifications. The current convention is a combination of 1973 Convention and the 1978 Protocol. It entered into force on 2 October 1983. As of December 2025, 162 states, representing 98.89 per cent of the world's shipping tonnage, are signatories to the MARPOL convention.

As well as updates to MARPOL and SOLAS, the IMO facilitated several updated international maritime conventions, including the International Convention on Load Lines in 1966 (replacing an earlier 1930 Convention), the International Regulations for Preventing Collisions at Sea in 1972 (also replacing an earlier set of rules) and the STCW Convention in 1978. In 1975, the assembly of the IMO decided that future conventions of the International Convention for the Safety of Life at Sea (SOLAS) and other IMO instruments should use SI units. Sea transportation is one of few industrial areas that still commonly uses non-metric units such as the nautical mile (nmi) for distance and knots (kn) for speed or velocity. In November 1975, the IMCO Assembly, as a part of comprehensive review of the Convention, decided to rename it as the International Maritime Organization (IMO); after ratifications, this happened in May 1982. Throughout its existence, the IMO has continued to produce new and updated conventions across a wide range of maritime issues covering not only safety of life and marine pollution but also encompassing safe navigation, search and rescue, wreck removal, tonnage measurement, liability and compensation, ship recycling, the training and certification of seafarers, and piracy. More recently SOLAS has been amended to bring an increased focus on maritime security through the International Ship and Port Facility Security (ISPS) Code. The IMO has also increased its focus on smoke emissions from ships. In 1983, the IMO established the World Maritime University in Malmö, Sweden and also facilitated the adoption of the IGC Code. In 1991, the IMO facilitated the adoption of the International Grain Code.

In December 2002, the IMO adopted the International Ship and Port Facility Security Code (ISPS) Code as part of amendments to the 1974 SOLAS Convention. The code entered into force under SOLAS chapter XI-2 on 1 July 2004 and established a mandatory security regime for international shipping, including requirements for ship and port facility security plans.

On 1 January 2017, the IMO introduced a new mandatory International Code for Ships Operating in Polar Waters (Polar Code), covering shipping operations in the polar regions of Earth.

In 2025, the IMO updated its logo to all six official UN languages (Arabic, Chinese, English, French, Russian, Spanish).

== Headquarters ==
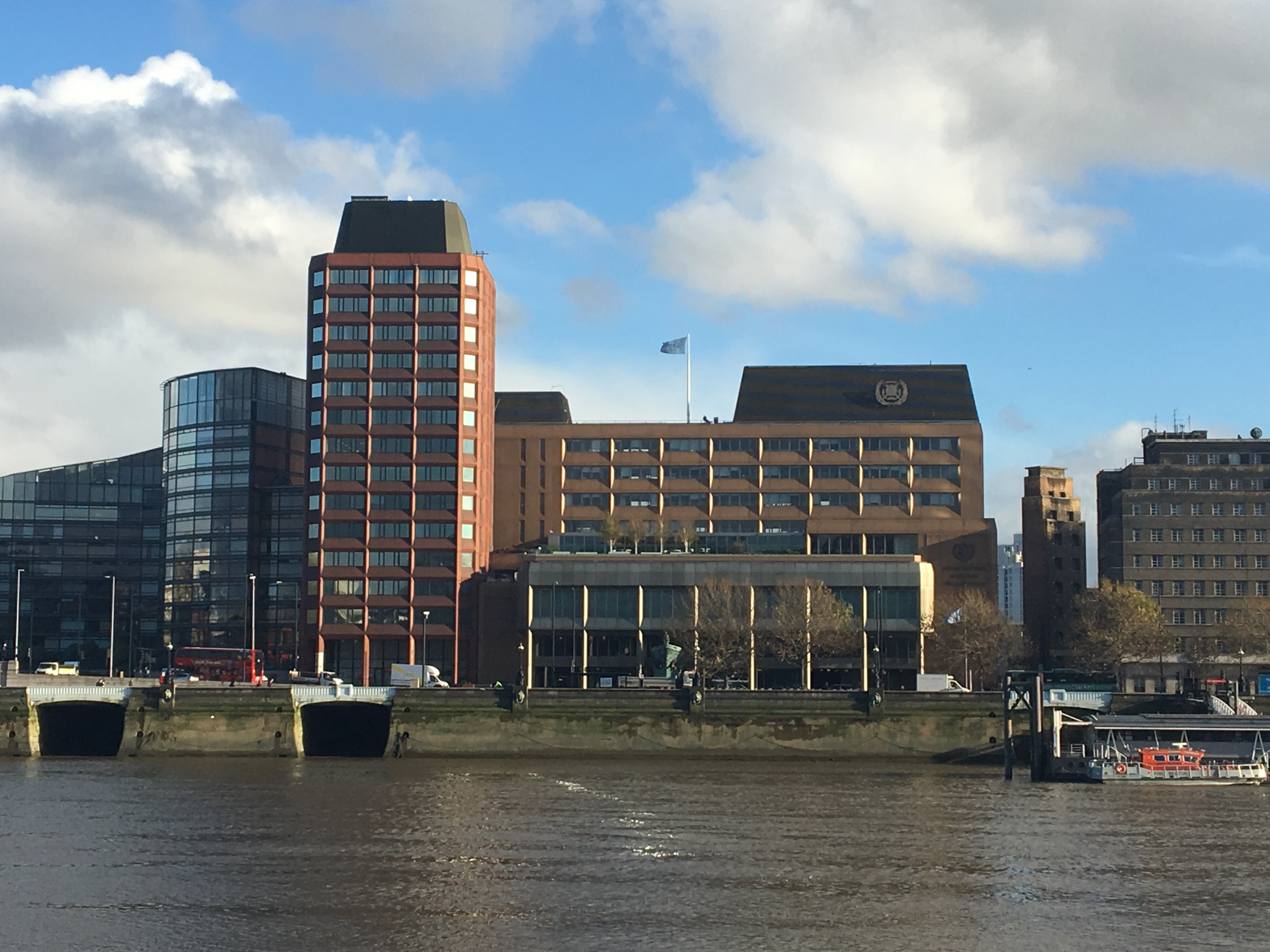
IMO building from across Thames

The IMO headquarters is a large purpose-built building facing the River Thames on the Albert Embankment, in Lambeth, London. The organization moved into its new headquarters in late 1982, with the building being officially opened by Queen Elizabeth II on 17 May 1983. The architects of the building were Douglass Marriott, Worby & Robinson. The front of the building is dominated by a seven-metre high, ten-tonne bronze sculpture of the bow of a ship, with a lone seafarer maintaining a look-out. The previous headquarters of IMO were at 101 Piccadilly (now the home of the Embassy of Japan), prior to that at 22 Berners Street in Fitzrovia and originally in Chancery Lane.

== Structure ==
The IMO consists of an Assembly, a Council and five main Committees. The organization is led by a Secretary-General. A number of Sub-Committees support the work of the main technical committees.

=== Governance of IMO ===
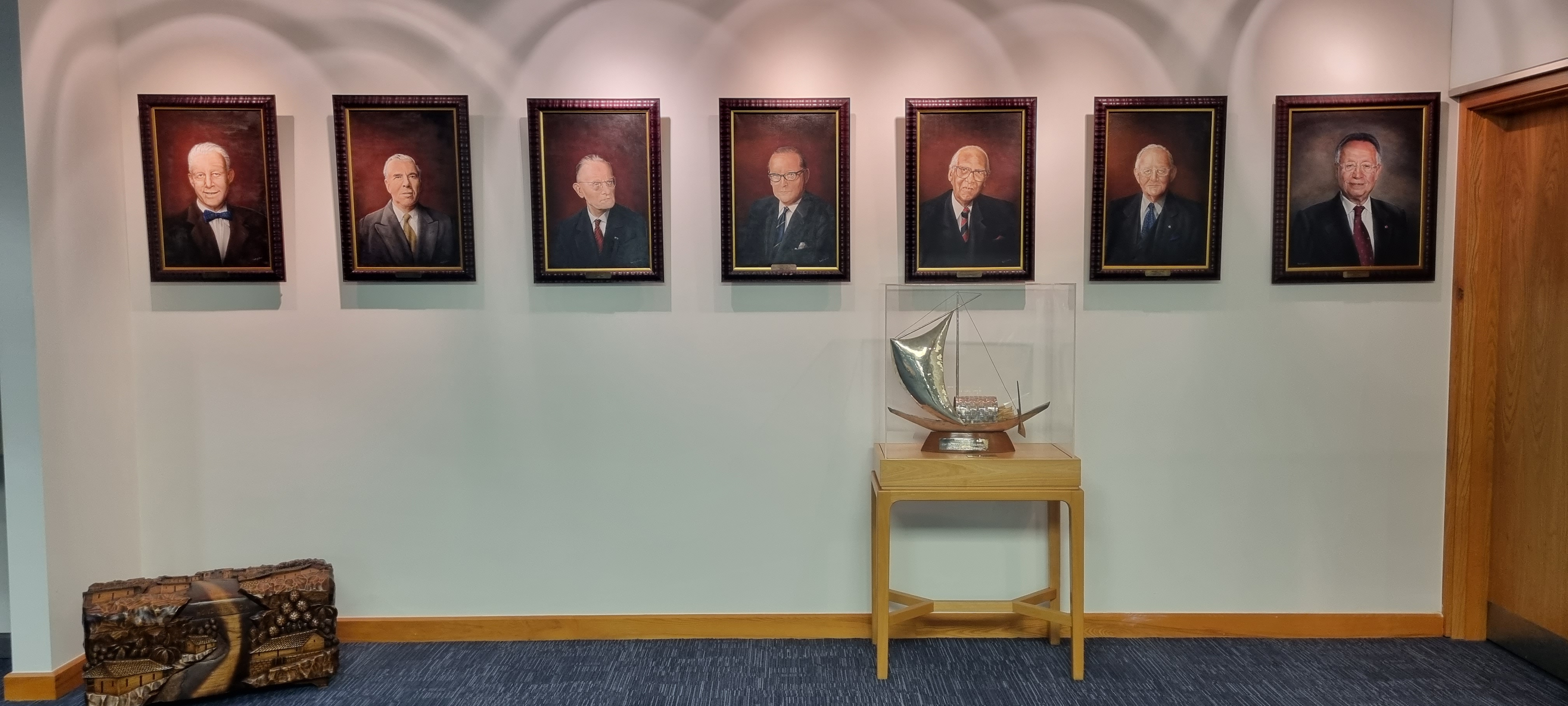
The IMO wall honouring former Secretaries-General

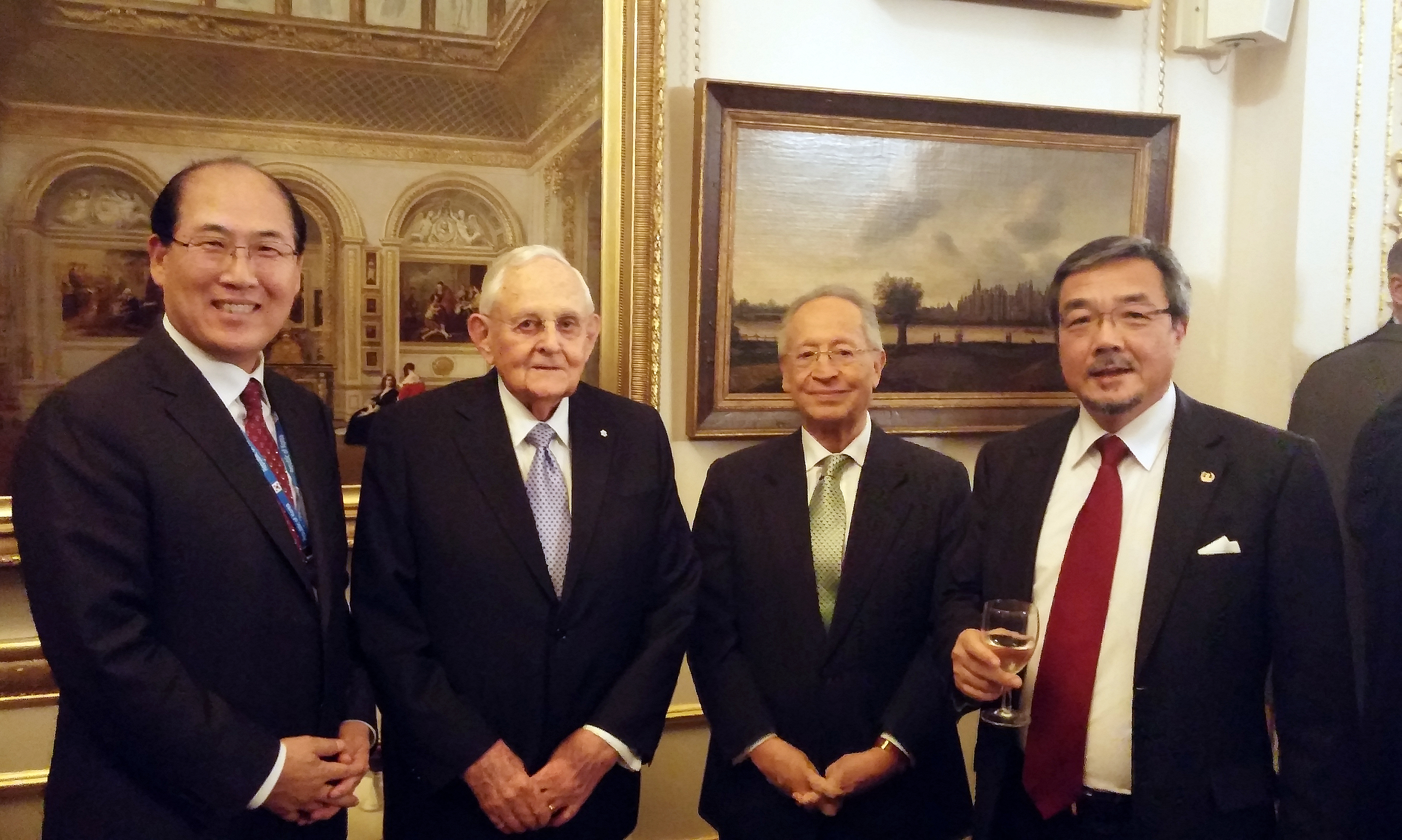
From the left: Incoming Secretary-General Kitack Lim with predecessors O'Neill, Mitropoulos and Sekimizu, December 2015

The governing body of the International Maritime Organization is the Assembly which meets every two years. In between Assembly sessions a Council, consisting of 40 Member States elected by the Assembly, acts as the governing body. The technical work of the International Maritime Organization is carried out by a series of Committees. The Secretariat consists of some 300 international civil servants headed by a Secretary-General.

The Secretary-General Arsenio Domínguez took office for a four year term on 1 January 2024, having been elected in July 2023. The previous Secretary-General was Kitack Lim from South Korea elected for a four-year term at the 114th session of the IMO Council in June 2015 and at the 29th session of the IMO's Assembly in November 2015. His mandate started on 1 January 2016. At the 31st session of the Assembly in 2019 he was re-appointed for a second term, ending on 31 December 2023.

Name	Country	Term
Ove Nielsen	Denmark	1959–1961†
William Graham	United Kingdom	1961–1963
Jean Roullier	France	1964-1967
Colin Goad	United Kingdom	1968-1973
Chandrika Prasad Srivastava	India	1974-1989
William A. O'Neil	Canada	1990-2003
Efthymios Mitropoulos	Greece	2004-2011
Koji Sekimizu	Japan	2012-2015
Kitack Lim	South Korea	2016–2023
Arsenio Dominguez	Panama	2024–present

=== Technical committees ===
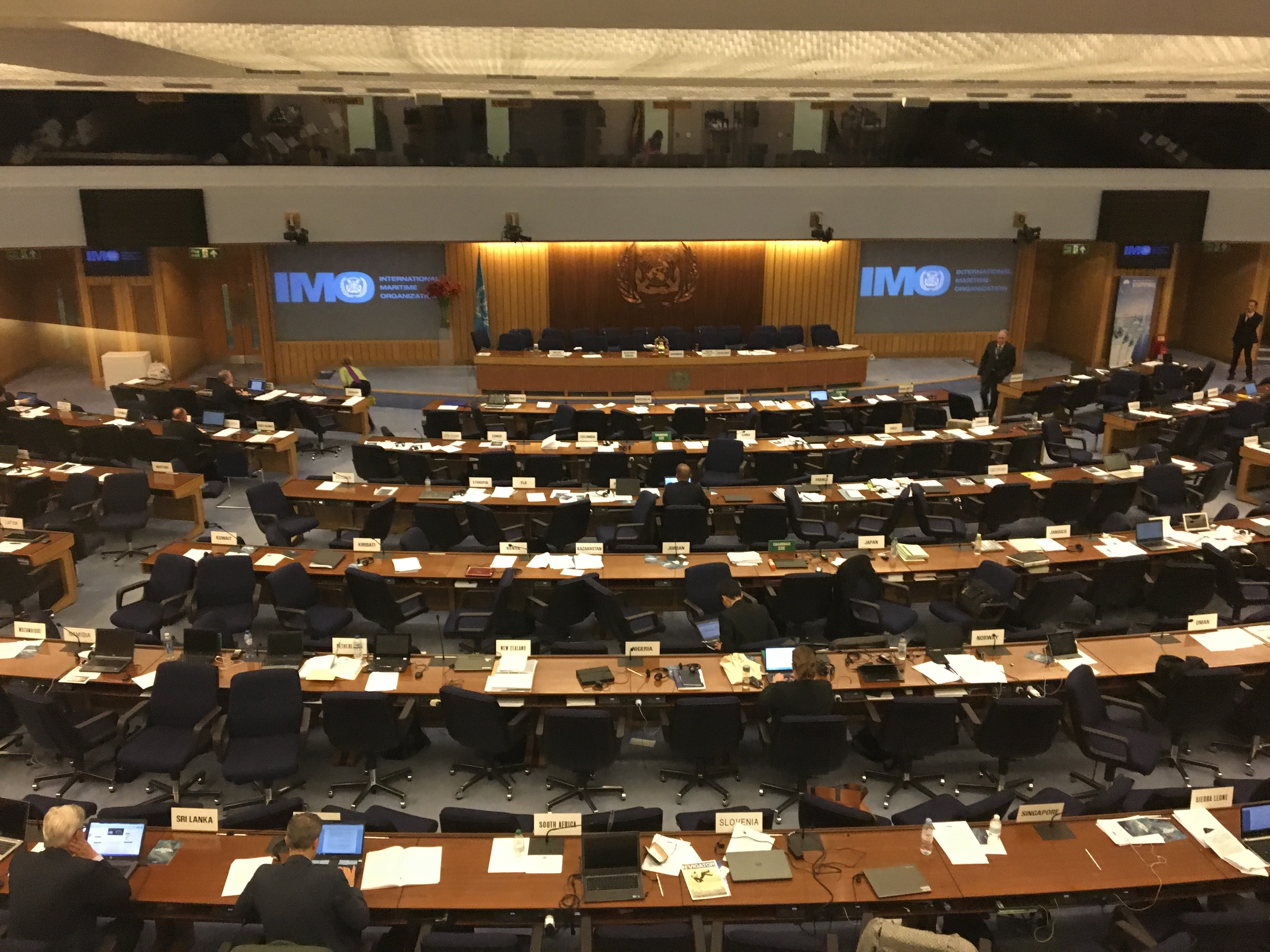
IMO's main hall assembly chamber, where the MSC and MEPC committees meet each year

The technical work of the International Maritime Organization is carried out by five principal Committees:

- The Maritime Safety Committee (MSC)
- The Marine Environment Protection Committee (MEPC)
- The Legal Committee
- The Technical Cooperation Committee, for capacity building
- The Facilitation Committee, to simplify the documentation and formalities required in international shipping. The Committees meet once or twice a year attended by Member States and NGOs.

==== Maritime Safety Committee ====
It is regulated in the Article 28(a) of the Convention on the IMO:

ARTICLE 28

(a) The Maritime Safety Committee shall consider any matter within the scope of the Organization concerned with aids to navigation, construction and equipment of vessels, manning from a safety standpoint, rules for the prevention of collisions, handling of dangerous cargoes, maritime safety procedures and requirements, hydrographic information, log-books and navigational records, marine casualty investigation, salvage and rescue, and any other matters directly affecting maritime safety.

(b) The Maritime Safety Committee shall provide machinery for performing any duties assigned to it by this Convention, the Assembly or the Council, or any duty within the scope of this Article which may be assigned to it by or under any other international instrument and accepted by the Organization.

(c) Having regard to the provisions of Article 25, the Maritime Safety Committee, upon request by the Assembly or the Council or, if it deems such action useful in the interests of its own work, shall maintain such close relationship with other bodies as may further the purposes of the Organization

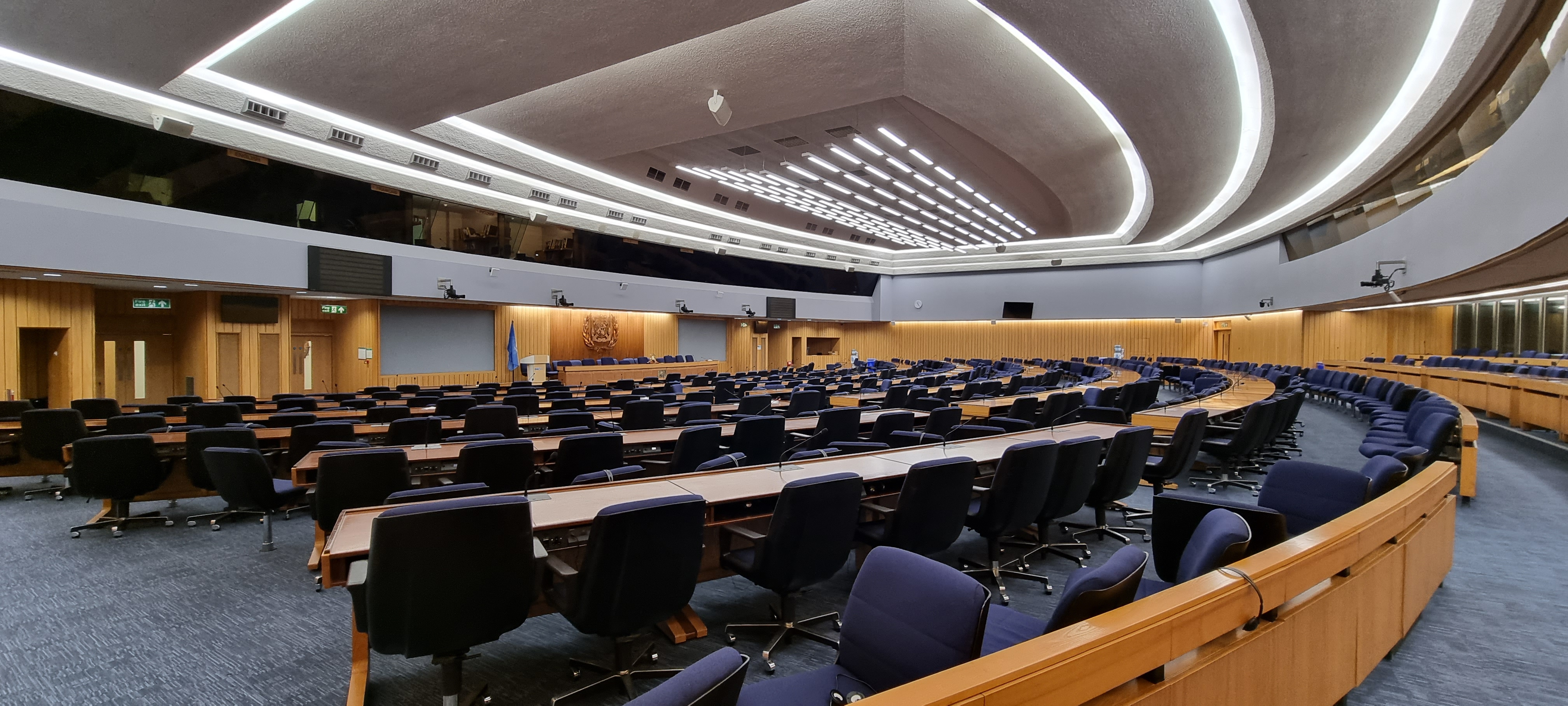
The main Plenary Hall of the IMO, where the Maritime Safety Committee meets

The Maritime Safety Committee is the most senior of these and is the main Technical Committee; it oversees the work of its nine sub-committees and initiates new topics. One broad topic it deals with is the effect of the human element on casualties; this work has been put to all of the sub-committees, but meanwhile, the Maritime Safety Committee has developed a code for the management of ships which will ensure that agreed operational procedures are in place and followed by the ship and shore-side staff.

==== Sub-committees ====
The MSC and MEPC are assisted in their work by a number of sub-committees which are open to all Member States. The committees are:

- Sub-Committee on Human Element, Training and Watchkeeping (HTW)
- Sub-Committee on Implementation of IMO Instruments (III)
- Sub-Committee on Navigation, Communications and Search and Rescue (NCSR)
- Sub-Committee on Pollution Prevention and Response (PPR)
- Sub-Committee on Ship Design and Construction (SDC)
- Sub-Committee on Ship Systems and Equipment (SSE)
- Sub-Committee on Carriage of Cargoes and Containers (CCC).

The names of the IMO sub-committees were changed in 2013. Prior to 2013 there were nine Sub-Committees as follows:

- Bulk Liquids and Gases (BLG)
- Carriage of Dangerous Goods, Solid Cargoes and Containers(DSC)
- Fire Protection (FP)
- Radio-communications and Search and Rescue (COMSAR)
- Safety of Navigation (NAV)
- Ship Design and Equipment (DE)
- Stability and Load Lines and Fishing Vessels Safety (SLF)
- Standards of Training and Watchkeeping (STW)
- Flag State Implementation (FSI)

== Membership ==
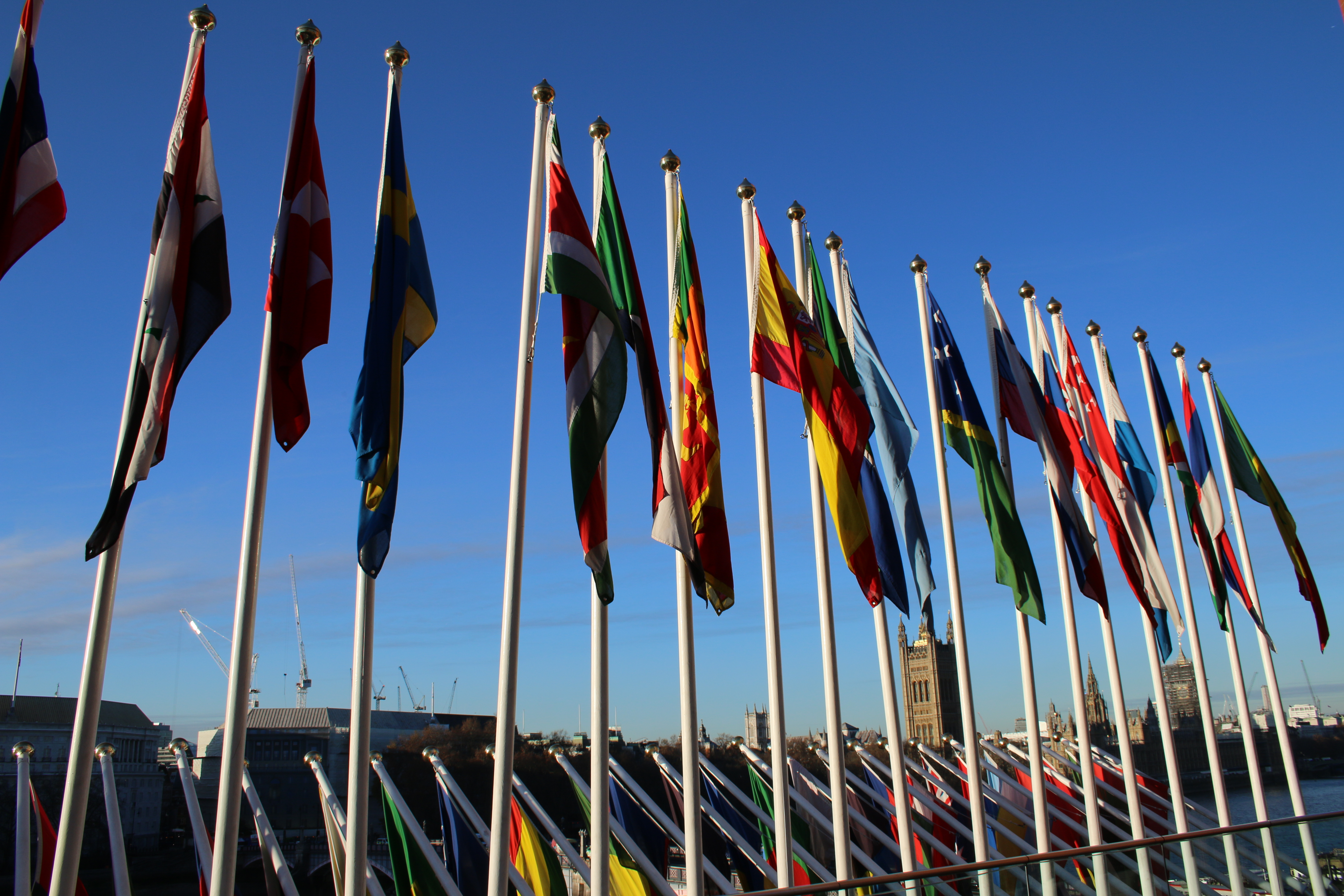
Flags on the IMO building

To join the IMO, a state ratifies a multilateral Convention on the International Maritime Organization. As of 2025, there are 176 member states of the IMO, which includes 175 of the UN member states plus the Cook Islands. The first state to ratify the convention was Canada in October 1948, but it took until March 1958 when Egypt and Japan brought the number of parties to 21, required by the Convention.

These are the current members with the year they joined:

- Albania (1993)
- Algeria (1963)
- Angola (1977)
- Antigua and Barbuda (1986)
- Argentina (1953)
- Armenia (2018)
- Australia (1952)
- Austria (1975)
- Azerbaijan (1995)
- Bahamas (1976)
- Bahrain (1976)
- Bangladesh (1976)
- Barbados (1970)
- Belarus (2016)
- Belgium (1951)
- Belize (1990)
- Benin (1980)
- Bolivia (1987)
- Bosnia and Herzegovina (1993)
- Botswana (2021)
- Brazil (1963)
- Brunei (1984)
- Bulgaria (1960)
- Cambodia (1961)
- Cameroon (1961)
- Canada (1948)
- Cape Verde (1976)
- Chile (1972)
- China (1973)
- Colombia (1974)
- Comoros (2001)
- Congo (1975)
- Cook Islands (2008)
- Costa Rica (1981)
- Croatia (1960/1992)
- Cuba (1966)
- Cyprus (1973)
- Czech Republic (1963/1993)
- Democratic Republic of the Congo (1973)
- Denmark (1959)
- Djibouti (1979)
- Dominica (1979)
- Dominican Republic (1953)
- Ecuador (1956)
- Egypt (1958)
- El Salvador (1981)
- Equatorial Guinea (1972)
- Eritrea (1993)
- Estonia (1992)
- Ethiopia (1975)
- Fiji (1983)
- Finland (1959)
- France (1952)
- Gabon (1976)
- Gambia (1979)
- Georgia (1993)
- Germany (1959)
- Ghana (1959)
- Greece (1958)
- Grenada (1998)
- Guatemala (1983)
- Guinea (1975)
- Guinea-Bissau (1977)
- Guyana (1980)
- Haiti (1953)
- Honduras (1954)
- Hungary (1970)
- Iceland (1960)
- India (1959)
- Indonesia (1961)
- Iran (1958)
- Iraq (1973)
- Ireland (1951)
- Israel (1952)
- Italy (1957)
- Ivory Coast (1960)
- Jamaica (1976)
- Japan (1958)
- Jordan (1973)
- Kazakhstan (1994)
- Kenya (1973)
- Kiribati (2003)
- Kuwait (1960)
- Kyrgyzstan (2024)
- Latvia (1993)
- Lebanon (1966)
- Liberia (1959)
- Libya (1970)
- Lithuania (1995)
- Luxembourg (1991)
- Madagascar (1961)
- Malawi (1989)
- Malaysia (1971)
- Maldives (1967)
- Malta (1966)
- Marshall Islands (1998)
- Mauritania (1961)
- Mauritius (1978)
- Mexico (1954)
- Moldova (2001)
- Monaco (1989)
- Mongolia (1996)
- Montenegro (1960/2006)
- Morocco (1962)
- Mozambique (1979)
- Myanmar (1951)
- Namibia (1994)
- Nauru (2018)
- Nepal (1979)
- Netherlands (1949)
- New Zealand (1960)
- Nicaragua (1982)
- Nigeria (1962)
- North Korea (1986)
- North Macedonia (1960/1993)
- Norway (1958)
- Oman (1974)
- Pakistan (1958)
- Palau (2011)
- Panama (1958)
- Papua New Guinea (1976)
- Paraguay (1993)
- Peru (1968)
- Philippines (1964)
- Poland (1960)
- Portugal (1976)
- Qatar (1977)
- Romania (1965)
- Russia (1958)
- Saint Kitts and Nevis (2001)
- Saint Lucia (1980)
- Saint Vincent and the Grenadines (1981)
- Samoa (1996)
- San Marino (2002)
- São Tomé and Príncipe (1990)
- Saudi Arabia (1969)
- Senegal (1960)
- Serbia (1960/2000)
- Seychelles (1978)
- Sierra Leone (1973)
- Singapore (1966)
- Slovakia (1963/1993)
- Slovenia (1993)
- Solomon Islands (1988)
- Somalia (1978)
- South Africa (1995)
- South Korea (1962)
- Spain (1962)
- Sri Lanka (1972)
- Sudan (1974)
- Suriname (1976)
- Sweden (1959)
- Switzerland (1955)
- Syria (1963)
- Tanzania (1974)
- Thailand (1973)
- Timor-Leste (2005)
- Togo (1983)
- Tonga (2000)
- Trinidad and Tobago (1965)
- Tunisia (1963)
- Turkey (1958)
- Turkmenistan (1993)
- Tuvalu (2004)
- Uganda (2009)
- Ukraine (1994)
- United Arab Emirates (1980)
- United Kingdom (1949)
- United States (1950)
- Uruguay (1968)
- Vanuatu (1986)
- Venezuela (1975)
- Vietnam (1984)
- Yemen (1979)
- Zambia (2014)
- Zimbabwe (2005)

The three associate members are the Faroe Islands (2002), Hong Kong (1967) and Macau (1990).

In 1961, the territories of Sabah and Sarawak, which had been included through the participation of United Kingdom, became joint associate members; in 1963 they became part of Malaysia.

The most recent new members are Armenia (landlocked, January 2018), Nauru (May 2018), Botswana (landlocked, October 2021) and, on 27 February 2024, landlocked Kyrgyzstan became the 176th Member State of the organization.

Most UN member states that are not members of IMO are landlocked countries. These include Afghanistan, Andorra, Bhutan, Burkina Faso, Burundi, Central African Republic, Chad, Eswatini, Laos, Lesotho, Liechtenstein, Mali, Niger, Rwanda, South Sudan, Tajikistan and Uzbekistan. The Federated States of Micronesia, an island-nation in the Pacific Ocean, is also a non-member. Taiwan, as Republic of China, was a member of the IMCO from 1958 until UN changed its recognition to People's Republic of China in 1971; its later attempts to join IMO were blocked, although it has a major shipping industry.

== Legal instruments ==
IMO is the source of approximately 60 legal instruments that guide the regulatory development of its member states to improve safety at sea, facilitate trade among seafaring states and protect the maritime environment. The most well known is the International Convention for the Safety of Life at Sea (SOLAS), as well as International Convention for the Prevention of Pollution from Ships (MARPOL). Others include the International Oil Pollution Compensation Funds (IOPC). It also functions as a depository of yet to be ratified treaties, such as the International Convention on Liability and Compensation for Damage in Connection with the Carriage of Hazardous and Noxious Substances by Sea, 1996 (HNS Convention) and Nairobi International Convention of Removal of Wrecks (2007).

IMO regularly enacts regulations, which are broadly enforced by national and local maritime authorities in member countries, such as the International Regulations for Preventing Collisions at Sea (COLREG). The IMO has also enacted a Port state control (PSC) authority, allowing domestic maritime authorities such as coast guards to inspect foreign-flag ships calling at ports of the many port states. Memoranda of Understanding (protocols) were signed by some countries unifying Port State Control procedures among the signatories.

Conventions, Codes and Regulations:

- MARPOL Convention
  - Marpol Annex I
- SOLAS Convention
  - IMDG Code
  - ISM Code
  - ISPS Code
  - Polar Code
  - IGF Code
  - IGC Code
  - IBC Code
  - TDC Code
  - International Code on Intact Stability
  - INF Code
  - International Grain Code
  - IMSBC Code
- STCW Convention
- International Code of Signals – mandatory for carriage on ships and used for communications between all ships, including merchant vessels and naval vessels
- International Ballast Water Management Convention (BWM Convention)
- International Convention on Civil Liability for Oil Pollution Damage (CLC Convention)
- International Convention on Maritime Search and Rescue (SAR Convention)
- International Convention on Oil Pollution Preparedness, Response and Co-operation (OPRC)
- HNS Convention
- International Regulations for Preventing Collisions at Sea (COLREG)
- International Convention on Load Lines (CLL)
- International Convention on the Establishment of an International Fund for Compensation for Oil Pollution Damage (FUND92)
- Convention for the Suppression of Unlawful Acts against the Safety of Maritime Navigation (SUA Convention)
- International Convention on the Control of Harmful Anti-fouling Systems on Ships (AFS Convention)
- Athens Convention (PAL)
- Nairobi International Convention on the Removal of Wrecks
- Convention on Facilitation of International Maritime Traffic
- The Casualty Investigation Code – enacted through Resolution MSC.255(84), of 16 May 2008. The full title is Code of the International Standards and Recommended Practices for a Safety Investigation into a maritime casualty or incident.

== Current priorities ==
Recent initiatives at the IMO have included amendments to SOLAS, which among other things, included upgraded fire protection standards on passenger ships, the International Convention on Standards of Training, Certification and Watchkeeping for Seamen (STCW) which establishes basic requirements on training, certification and watchkeeping for seafarers and to the Convention on the Prevention of Maritime Pollution (MARPOL 73/78), which required double hulls on all tankers.

=== Environmental issues ===
==== GHG emissions ====
The IMO has a role in tackling international climate change. The First Intersessional Meeting of IMO's Working Group on Greenhouse Gas Emissions from Ships took place in Oslo, Norway (June 2008), tasked with developing the technical basis for the reduction mechanisms that may form part of a future IMO regime to control greenhouse gas emissions from international shipping, and a draft of the actual reduction mechanisms themselves, for further consideration by IMO's Marine Environment Protection Committee (MEPC). The IMO participated in the 2015 United Nations Climate Change Conference in Paris seeking to establish itself as the "appropriate international body to address greenhouse gas emissions from ships engaged in international trade". Nonetheless, there has been widespread criticism of the IMO's relative inaction since the conclusion of the Paris conference, with the initial data-gathering step of a three-stage process to reduce maritime greenhouse emissions expected to last until 2020. In 2018, the Initial IMO Strategy on the reduction of GHG emissions from ships was adopted.

In April 2025, the IMO's Marine Environment Protection Committee (MEPC) approved net-zero regulations for the global shipping industry to reach net-zero GHG emissions in the shipping industry by or around 2050. The changes would require that from 2028, shipowners would be required to use cleaner fuels or face a carbon pricing mechanism. However, in October 2025, at a 2nd extraordinary session, adoption of the amendments to MARPOL Annex VI to bring the regulations into force were delayed to a future session.

==== Ballast water management ====
The IMO has also taken action to mitigate the global effects of ballast water and sediment discharge, through the 2004 Ballast Water Management Convention, which entered into force in September 2017.

==== Biofouling ====
In April 2025, at the IMO MEPC 83 meeting, the IMO agreed to develop a legally binding framework for controlling and managing ships' biofouling to reduce the accumulation of marine organisms on the hulls of ships and thereby reduce the transfer of invasive aquatic species. Controlling ship's biofouling also improves the environmental efficiency of ships by reducing drag resistance.

=== Maritime safety ===
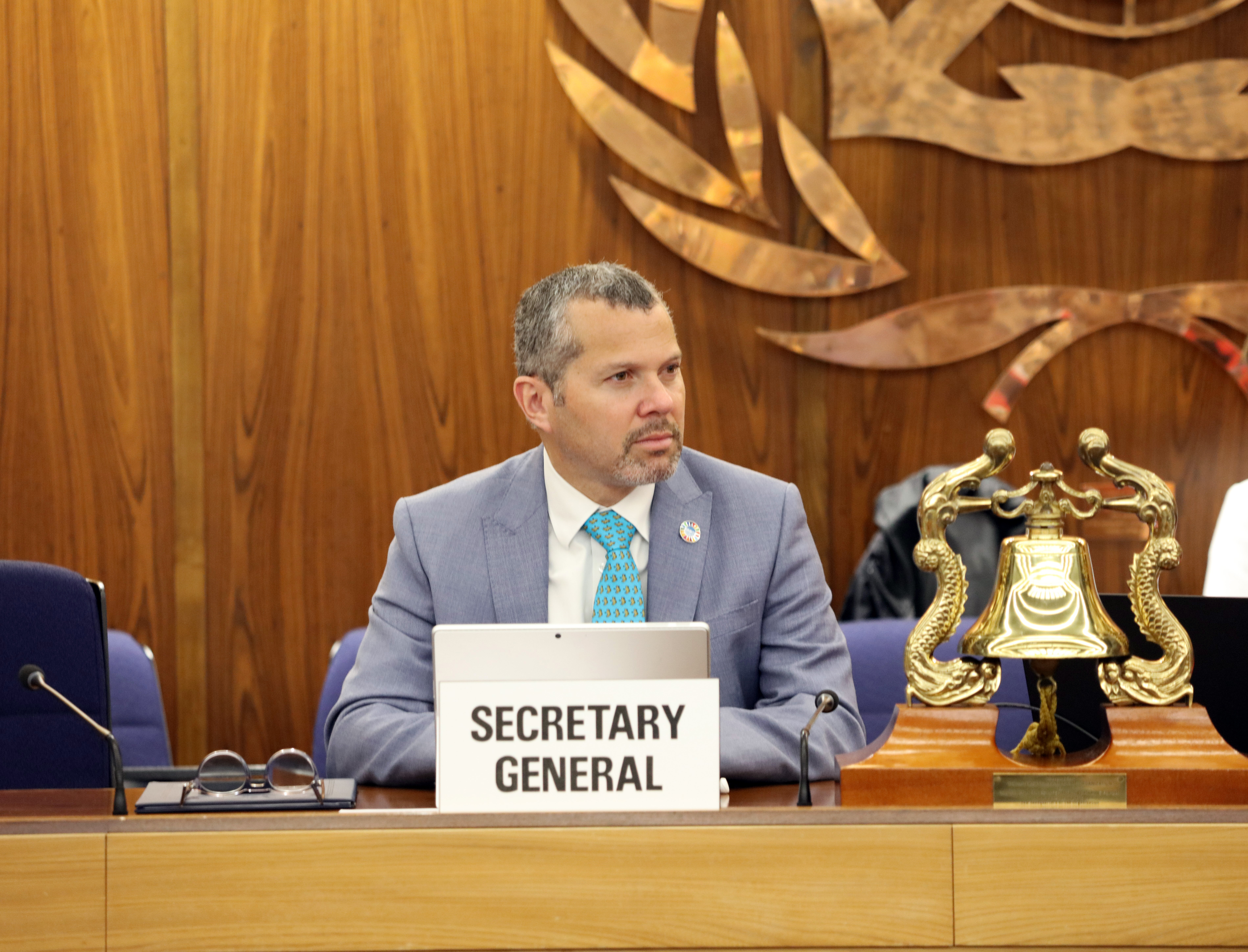
IMO Secretary General Dominguez at the 2024 meeting of the Maritime Safety Committee

The IMO's e-Navigation system has harmonized marine navigation systems with supporting shore services, as available to seamen and shore-side traffic services called. An e-Navigation strategy was ratified in 2005, and an implementation plan was developed through three IMO sub-committees. The plan was completed by 2014 and implemented in November of that year.

On 1 January 2011, ECDIS (Electronic Chart Display Information Systems) were made mandatory for new ships and for existing ships subject to a phased update process which was completed on 1 July 2018.

In December 2023, the IMO adopted a resolution targeting "Shadow fleet" ("dark fleet") tankers that form a risk by undertaking illegal and unsafe activities at sea. Primarily working for Iran and Russia to breach international sanctions, the tankers, many of which are elderly and unreliable, often undertake mid ocean transfers in an attempt to evade sanctions. The resolution calls upon flag states to "adhere to measures which lawfully prohibit or regulate" the transfer of cargoes at sea, known as ship-to-ship transfers.

In June 2025, the IMO adopted amendments to SOLAS Regulation V/23 on improving pilot ladder safety, including associated new Performance Standards for pilot transfer arrangements (to take effect 1 January 2028).

=== Fishing safety ===
The IMO Cape Town Agreement is an international International Maritime Organization legal instrument established in 2012, that sets out minimum safety requirements for fishing vessels of 24 metres in length and over or equivalent in gross tons. The Agreement is expected to come into force in February 2027, one year after Argentina ratified the Agreement.

== See also ==
- Active Shipbuilding Experts' Federation – International association representing shipbuilding classification societies
- IMO number – International ship identification number
- International Hydrographic Organization – Intergovernmental organization
- International Maritime Law Institute
- International Maritime Rescue Federation – International non-governmental organisation
- United Nations Convention on the Law of the Sea – International maritime law
- Standard Marine Communication Phrases – Set of phrases in English for use at sea
- NAVAREA – Maritime zones relating to navigational warnings
