= World Maritime University =

Postgraduate maritime university in Malmö, Sweden

- Other name: WMU
- Type: International university
- Established: 4 July 1983; 43 years ago
- Parent institution: International Maritime Organization
- Affiliations: United Nations
- Chancellor: Arsenio Dominguez
- President: Maximo Q. Mejia, Jr.
- Academic staff: 29
- Students: 350 (2017)
- Postgraduates: 327 (2017)
- Doctoral students: 23 (2017)
- Location: Malmö, Sweden; 55.607750°N 12.996570°E
- Campus: Urban
- Branches: Shanghai (Shanghai Maritime University); Dalian (Dalian Maritime University)
- Website: www.wmu.se

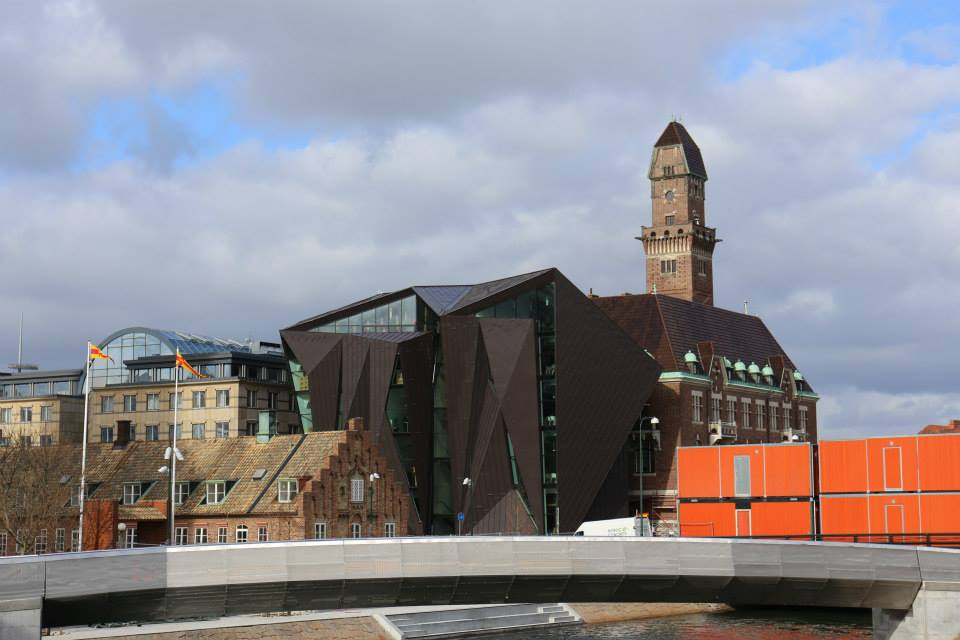
New WMU Building

The World Maritime University (WMU), in Malmö, Sweden, is a postgraduate maritime university founded within the framework of the International Maritime Organization (IMO)—a specialized agency of the United Nations. Established by an IMO Assembly Resolution in 1983, the aim of WMU is to be the world centre of excellence in postgraduate maritime and oceans education, professional training and research, while building global capacity and promoting sustainable development.

== Status ==
WMU is considered an international university and has been granted the status of a UN institution by its host country, the Government of Sweden. Serving as a center for people of many nationalities to participate in teaching and learning. WMU encourages international co-operation to address international maritime problems and coordinate international action. Programmes offered include Ph.D. and M.Sc. degrees in Maritime Affairs as well as an M.Phil. Post-graduate diplomas are offered via distance education in Marine Insurance Law & Practice, Maritime Energy, Executive Maritime Management, and International Maritime Law. An LLM in International Maritime Law is also available via distance learning. Customized Executive Professional Development Courses (EPDCs) and international conferences and events cater to the professional maritime community. The University has an active research portfolio that includes maritime and ocean-related projects.

WMU is an education provider independent of any individual national education system, meaning that it is not a Swedish institution. The MSc in Maritime Affairs and the PhD in Maritime Affairs are accredited by the Government of Sweden, as well as the Ministry for Education and by ZEvA (Zentrale Evaluations- und Akkreditierungsagentur Hannover/ Central Evaluation and Accreditation Agency Hanover). WMU is operated for all IMO member States and is entitled to conduct activities in Sweden under the agreement concluded between IMO and the Government of Sweden and the provisions of the Charter of the WMU adopted by IMO for the WMU activities in Sweden (A 25/Res. 1030).

== History ==
In the early 1980s, the IMO recognized that there was a shortage of well-qualified, highly educated maritime experts, particularly in lesser developed nations. To address this gap, the IMO endeavored to found an institution to support member States with the high-level education necessary to implement international Conventions. Subsequently, in 1981 it passed Resolution A. 501(XII), which requested that the Secretary-General of the United Nations take all steps in order to establish a world maritime university.

In determining the institution's location, then IMO Secretary-General, Dr. C.P. Srivastava, approached the Swedish Ministry of Transport who welcomed the idea and Malmö was determined as the home of the institution. With the financial support of the Swedish government, the City of Malmö, and private donations, the WMU was inaugurated on 4 July 1983.

== Campus ==
WMU's headquarters are in the City of Malmö which has always provided facilities for the University. In April 2015, WMU moved to the historic Old Harbour Master's building, Tornhuset, in the center of Malmö. Completed in 1910 and designed by the eminent Swedish architect Harald Boklund, Tornhuset served as the main office for Malmö's harbor administration and was intended to provide panoramic views of shipping in the Öresund and in Malmö harbor.

An architectural competition by the City of Malmö sought the best possible design for the extension to Tornhuset. The winning entry by renowned architect Kim Utzon of Kim Utzon Architects in collaboration with the Australian firm of Terroir Architects, centered on the concept of the building as an "urban hinge" linking the historic city center of Malmö to the docklands. The new facilities were inaugurated in 2015 and successively received the City Building Prize (Stadsbyggnadspriset), the highest architecture prize awarded by the City of Malmö. The building was also awarded the 2015 Region Skåne Architecture Prize based on its design as well as how it transforms the surroundings and returns the historic Old Harbour Master's building to a maritime use. In 2016, the building was shortlisted for a World Architecture Festival Award in the category of Higher Education and Research. In addition to the main building, the City of Malmö provides space for the WMU-Sasakawa Global Ocean Institute and administrative and research staff in nearby buildings.

== Organization ==
WMU is governed by a Charter and Statutes, approved by IMO Assembly. The Board of Governors (BoG) is appointed by the IMO Secretary-General, and consists of up to 30 appointees, who each serve two-year renewable terms. The Board of Governors meets annually, chaired by WMU's Chancellor who to date has been the IMO Secretary-General. The BoG reports to IMO Council which consists of the 40 leading maritime States.

An Executive Board (EB) of up to 8 appointees by the BoG helps to facilitate the work of the WMU, provide oversight between sessions of the BoG, give directions and guidelines as necessary, consider draft plans of work and budgets, report to the BoG, and meet no less than three times a year. Members of the EB serve renewable two-year terms.

WMU's current Charter was established by IMO Resolution A.1130(30), which took effect on 1 January 2018. The appointment and functions of the Chancellor, the Board of Governors, the Executive Board, and the Academic Council are detailed in the Charter. Any amendment to the WMU Charter is submitted by the Board of Governors to the IMO Council for approval and thereafter to the IMO Assembly for adoption.

== Programmes ==
WMU offers postgraduate studies, meaning the students must have completed a relevant university education. In addition, students are expected to have worked in the industry for at least five years. A solid understanding of English is a requirement of all WMU programmes and students must pass internationally recognized tests of English as a foreign language. Students who need to sharpen their English skills prior to the start of the Malmö M.Sc. studies can enroll in the intensive, three-month English and Study Skills Programme (ESSP) focusing on maritime English. Programmes available as of 2024 include:

=== Doctoral programme ===
WMU offers a doctoral programme in Maritime Affairs within the following research priority areas:

- Environmental Impacts of Marine Activities
- Maritime and Marine Technology & Innovation
- Maritime Economics & Business
- Maritime Energy Management
- Maritime Law, Policy & Governance
- Maritime Safety
- Maritime Social & Labour Governance
- WMU-Sasakawa Global Ocean Institute

=== Master of Science in Maritime Affairs offered in Malmö, Sweden ===
The following areas of specialization include:

The areas of specialization in Malmö, Sweden include:

- Maritime Education and Training (MET)
- Maritime Energy Management (MEM)
- Maritime Law and Policy (MLP)
- Maritime Safety and Environmental Administration (MSEA)
- Ocean Sustainability, Governance and Management (OSGM)
- Port Management (PM)
- Shipping Management & Logistics (SML)

=== Master of Science in Maritime Affairs offered in China ===
The following areas of specialisations include:

- International Transport & Logistics (ITL) is offered in Shanghai (China) in cooperation with Shanghai Maritime University
- Maritime Safety & Environmental Management (MSEM) is offered in Dalian (China) in cooperation with Dalian Maritime University

=== Master of Philosophy in International Maritime Law & Ocean Policy ===
Offered in cooperation with the WMU's sister institution, the IMO International Maritime Law Institute (IMLI) in Malta.

=== Distance learning ===
WMU offers several programmes via distance learning; Executive Maritime Management postgraduate diploma in cooperation with DNV, International Maritime Law LLM and postgraduate diploma in co-operation with Lloyd's Maritime Academy, and postgraduate diplomas in Marine Insurance Law & Practice and Maritime Energy Management offered solely by WMU.

== Student life ==
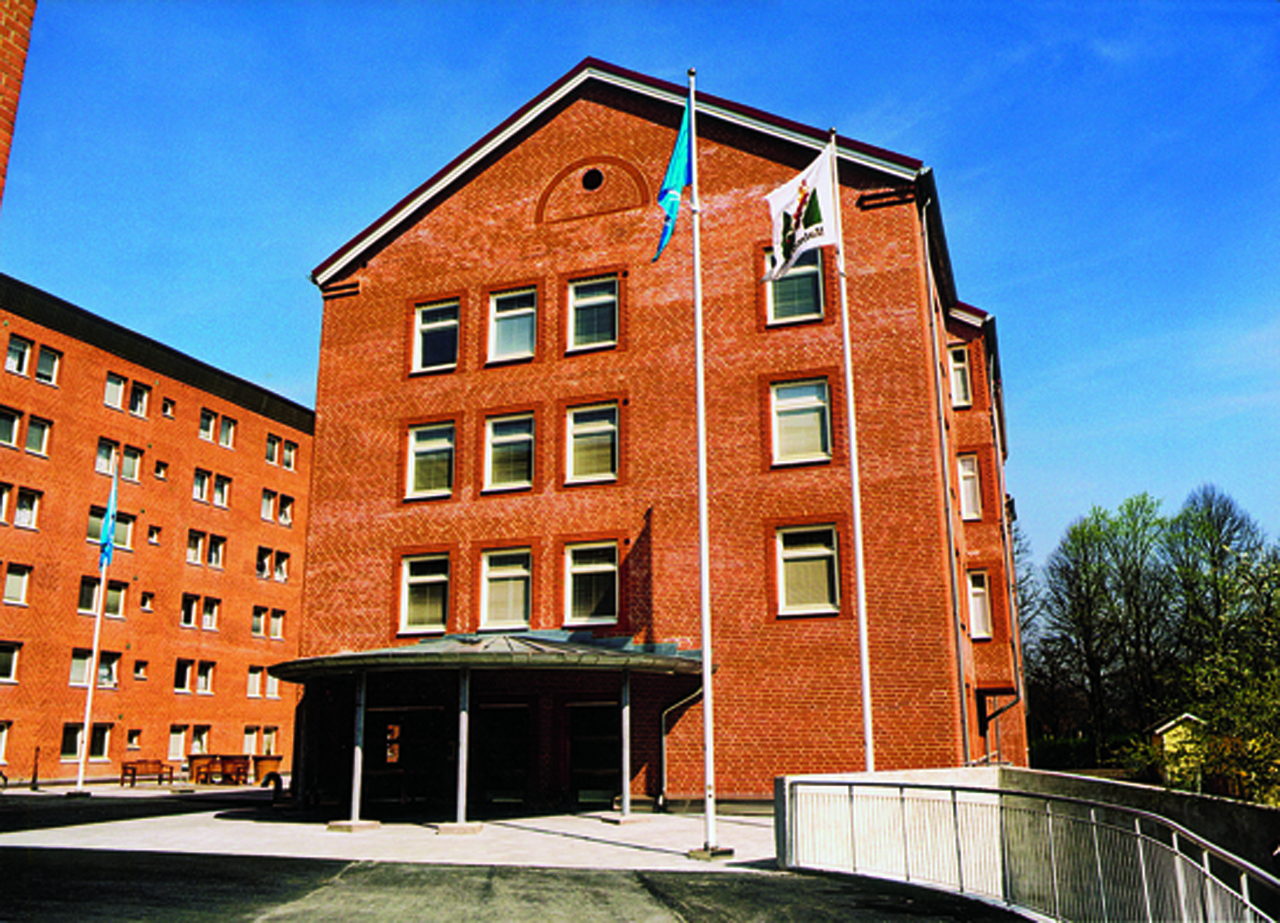
Henrik Smith Residence

The average age of the students is around mid-30s with representation from over 50 countries. WMU actively works to implement the United Nations Sustainable Development Goals, including Goal 5 regarding gender equality. Until the late 1990s, female students made up less than 5% of the Malmö intake. Recruitment strategies and support from fellowship donors have resulted in the proportion of female students rising to around a third of the annual intake.

Roughly 80 per cent of the students in the Malmö MSc programme are funded by fellowships provided by donors. Additionally, many governments, organizations and companies provide funding for their own employees. Only a fraction of the students in Malmö pay out-of-pocket.

== Teaching and learning ==
WMU has an international faculty of roughly 40 resident members, plus research associates, from countries across the world. There are also more than 80 Visiting Lecturers annually. Many of the faculty have backgrounds as mariners, and roughly a third of the WMU faculty are female.

In general, courses in the M.Sc. programmes are intensive, 1-2 week long classes allowing students to focus on a particular topic, and facilitating the incorporation of Visiting Lecturers. The first term focuses on Foundation studies that are completed by all students before specialized studies take place during Terms 2 and 3. The final Term 4 focuses on finalizing a dissertation, allowing students to deepen their specialization through research.

An important part of the Malmö M.Sc. education is the Field Study programme that provides the opportunity for students to travel and to see what they are learning in class being put into practice. Each student in the M.Sc. Malmö programme spends essentially 2–3 weeks traveling for field studies to host organizations in such countries as Chile, Denmark, Egypt, France, Germany, Greece, Korea, Malta, Norway, Portugal, The Netherlands, Singapore, Sweden, Turkey, and the United Kingdom. Field studies are also a part of the M.Sc. programmes in Shanghai and Dalian, China, but are typically more regionally oriented.

== International conferences ==
WMU organizes and hosts a range of international maritime conferences, often co-hosted with international organizations, including IMO, UNEP, and the EU.

== Professional development courses ==
WMU offers postgraduate programmes that require applicants to hold a relevant bachelor's degree (or equivalent qualification, such as a master mariner or chief engineer certificate) and substantial professional maritime experience. Competence in English is mandatory and must be demonstrated through recognized international examinations. Applicants to the Malmö M.Sc. who do not meet direct entry scores can enroll in the university's pre-sessional, three-month English and Study Skills Programme (ESSP) focusing on maritime English.

== Research ==
Parallel to the academic programmes, research is a priority at WMU with Research Priority Areas in Environmental Impact of Maritime Activities, Maritime Safety, Maritime Energy Management, Maritime Social & Labour Governance, Maritime & Marine Technology & Innovation, Maritime Economics & Business, and Maritime Law, Policy & Governance.

WMU-Sasakawa Global Ocean Institute The WMU-Sasakawa Global Ocean Institute was inaugurated in May 2018. As an independent focal point for the ocean-science-policy-law-industry interface where policy makers, the scientific community, regulators, industry actors, academics, and representatives of civil society meet to discuss how best to manage and use ocean spaces and their resources for the sustainable development of present and future generations. The Institute undertakes challenge-led, interdisciplinary, evidence-based research as well as educational and capacity-building training with a particular focus on the implementation of Goal 14 of the 2030 Agenda for Sustainable Development. The work of the institute is supported by The Nippon Foundation of Japan, Sweden, Germany, Canada, the European Commission and the City of Malmö.

== Institutional publications ==
The WMU Journal of Maritime Affairs (WMU JoMA) was established in October 2002 and since 2011 has been published by Springer. It is an international journal that covers the subject areas of maritime safety, marine environment protection and shipping operations, giving special attention to the human element and the impact of technology. The WMU JoMA is for professionals in maritime administration, industry and education. It aims at serving the international maritime community by presenting fresh ideas and current thinking on subjects of topical interest, reporting on relevant research findings and addressing interrelationships between safety, environment protection and efficiency of maritime transport.

== Alumni ==
As of 2025, there are over 6,600 alumni from 171 countries and territories. The WMU alumni assume positions of prominence around the world such as prime minister, ministers and senior maritime officials, directors of shipping companies and ports, and as heads of maritime academies and naval organizations. They rise to prominent positions within UN organizations including IMO Secretary-General, IMO Directors, WMU President, and many represent their home countries at IMO and in international forums and organizations.
