= MACS3 =

Computer controlled loading system for commercial vessels

- Other names: Seacos
- Developer: Kaleris | Navis Germany GmbH
- Release: 1984
- Stable release: 1.1.86 (.NET) / 05.09.2025
- Written in: C++ and C#
- Operating system: Windows
- Platform: .NET Framework under x86 and X86-64
- Available in: English, German, Russian, Chinese
- Type: Application software for Transportation
- License: Proprietary software
- Website: kaleris.com

The MACS3 Loading Computer System is a computer controlled loading system for commercial vessels, developed by Navis Carrier & Vessel Solutions. Prior to October, 2017 it was offered by Interschalt maritime systems GmbH, and before 2007 - by Seacos Computersysteme & Software GmbH.

MACS3 consists of computer hardware and a range of software, which aim to minimize the operational load while loading a vessel, and to prevent any hard limitations from being breached.

== Design principles ==
The software architecture and user interface of the MACS3 Loading Computer System are designed according to the standard ISO 16155:2006 Ships and marine technology - Computer applications - Shipboard loading instruments, and to the following Rules and Recommendations:

1. DNVGL Class Guideline DNV-CG-0053 : Approval and certification of the software of loading computer systems
2. ABS Guidance Notes for the Application of Ergonomics to Marine Systems
3. BV Rules for the Classification of Steel Ships, Pt C, Ch 3, Sec 3 "COMPUTER BASED SYSTEMS"
4. IACS Recommendation on Loading Instruments (No 48)
5. IACS Unified Requirements (No E27) Cyber resilience of on-board systems and equipment

Beside proprietary mxml format, MACS3 (as well as StowMAN planning tool from Navis) does support EDIFACT formats (implemented according to the Ship Message Design Group (SMDG) recommendations) and Digital Container Shipping Association (DCSA) standard for Load List and Bay Plan

== Software structure ==
The software of MACS3 Loading Computer System includes the MACS3 Basic Loading Program, performing functions of Categories A and B according to the ISO 16155:2006 and (optionally) a range of, performing functions of Category C:

- PolarCode Basic Module
- BELCO Container Management Module
- DAGO Dangerous Goods Modules
- StowMan Stowage Planning
- SEALASH Lashing Module
- MIXCARGO General Cargo Module
- RoRo Roll-on/roll-off Module
- Crane Operation Module
- Bulk Carrier Modules
- Tanker Modules
- BallastMAN Ballast Water Exchange Module
- Voyage History
- DastyMAN Damage Stability
- Online Program (Tanks Online)
- Mooring Module
- Squat effect Module

The system runs under Windows 10 or 11 Professional 64Bit.

== Programs and Features ==
=== MACS3 Basic Loading Program ===
MACS3 Basic Loading Program is designed for all ship types (containership, tanker, Bulk carrier, general cargo, RoRo, Passenger ship) in accordance with the unified IACS Requirement L5 "Onboard Computers for Stability Calculations". It is approved by all leading classification societies: LR, ABS, DNV, BV, ClassNK, KR, CCS.

MACS3 Basic Loading Program performs:

- Ship stability and strength calculations, covering all pertinent international regulations like e.g. IMO A.749
- Numerical and graphical results for metacentric height GM, trim, heel, draft, shear forces, bending moments and torsion
- Metacentric height GM check against various approved GM requirement curves
- GZ curve for dynamic stability
- Automatic wind pressure calculation
- Automatic ballast tank optimization
- Tank plan with visual editing
- Optional online measurement of tank levels and draft (sold separately)
- User interface with tabbed main window for multiple views, all fully customizable
- Screen and print reports in PDF, HTML and XML formats

MACS3 Basic Loading Program supports client–server software architecture for distributed cargo management and allows the complete loading condition (containers, tanks, general cargo and constant items) to be stored in a single compressed mxml-file, making it very easy for you to exchange loading conditions between ship and office.

=== BELCO Container Management Module ===
BELCO enhances the MACS3 Basic Loading Program with easy-to-use container management features, enabling to create the valid Stowage plan for container ships. It works with high level of integration into MACS3.NET, so any changes to the container cargo are immediately reflected in the MACS3 stability and strength calculations. The results of the MACS3 and BELCO can be displayed simultaneously at any time.

The MACS3 screen and print reporting in PDF, HTML and XML formats is also fully available to BELCO.

Data Features:

- Verified Gross Mass (VGM) functionality
- Variable container sizes
- Wide range of information per container: ISO 6346 (both old and new) and custom types, weight, ports of loading/discharge/final/transshipment, operator etc.
- Calculation of vertical, transversal and longitudinal centre of gravity for each container
- Full UN EDIFACT/BAPLIE support (BAPLIE 1.5, 2.0, 2.1, 2.2 and 3.1)
- UN LOCODE database
- Port rotation with date/time and quays

Cargo Handling

- Efficient pre-stowage and pre-discharge functions, bay-, row-, tier- or port-wise
- Visual editing of reefer positions and hot areas
- Loading/discharge list
- Plan view
- Fully functional layer view
- Fully functional single page view
- Top view with various criteria
- Block shift
- Multi-step Undo
- Hatch-cover handling
- Symbolic presentation of pier
- Result table with free selection of row/column criteria, including sub-rows, sub-columns and subtotals

On-the-fly and combined checks:

- Visibility (IMO and Panama Canal) check with blind sectors in relation to trim/draft change
- Segregation of Dangerous goods,
- Restows,
- Lashing forces,
- Lashing inventory,
- Stack weights (maximum stack weight according to the shipyard, as well as 20' stacks weights in holds according to the Classification Societies),
- "Flying" containers,
- Reefer plug positions,
- Hatch cover clearance,
- Compatibility of container types with ship design,
- Load and destination locations according to the UN Locode databases and to the Port Call List,
- Overdimensions,
- Handling instructions and Loading Remarks (like "away from boiler", "on-deck-only"),
- Container numbers,
- False empties, etc.

Visualization

- Multiple bay views with individual settings
- Visualization of hatch covers and tweendecks
- About 150 different container criteria for visualization and statistics
- Up to 12 information areas with text per container
- Containers can be coloured by a variety of criteria, e.g. by port of discharge
- Multiple colours per container
- Longitudinal section and top view with tanks, holds, containers and visibility lines
- Commodity list with possible restrictions
- Realistic 3D view – both Helicopter and Personal (Walking) modes

=== DAGO Dangerous Goods Modules ===
- Checks the fulfilment of the stowage and segregation requirements imposed by the latest version of the IMDG code (DAGO Part I)
- Includes a database of dangerous goods with all relevant information from the IMDG code and the Emergency Schedules (EmS) (DAGO Part I)
- Unlimited number of dangerous goods both per container and per ship
- Company-specific blacklists of IMDG classes and UN numbers
- CFR 49, list of Centers for Disease Control and Prevention (CDC) goods
- Takes orientation of reefer containers into account
- Fire Fighting and Safety Plan (DAGO Part II)
- Medical First Aid Guide (MFAG) (DAGO Part III)

=== StowMan Stowage Planning ===
- Stowage planning for on board use
- Import and export of container data in text files or EDIFACT / BAPLIE, export of MOVINS, COARRI, COPRAR

=== SEALASH Lashing Module ===
- Calculation of forces in container securing systems according to the rules of the classification societies LR, ABS, DNV, BV, ClassNK, KR, CCS.
- Following lashing notations are supported: Route Specific Container Stowage (RSCS and RSCS+ for both long haul voyages and limited short voyages, taking into account the weather forecasts) of DNV; CSSA and CSSA-R for ClassNK; Voyage- and Weather-dependent Boxmax (V, W, L) notation for LR; Unrestricted and Worldwide for BV; CLP and route-specific CLP-V Notation for ABS.
- Modelling of several internal and external lashing systems, checking the physical possibility to lash
- Calculation of lash forces per stack, with exceeding values in red
- Flying hints show exceeding lashing forces for containers
- Calculation of maximum weight of an additional container
- Visual lashing mode
- Lashing equipment inventory
- Check of available lash eyes
- Main parameter table

=== MIXSTOW 3D and Steel Coil: General Cargo, Ro/Ro and Ferry-Modules ===
- Manages all kinds of cargo: trailers, single parts, homogeneous surface cargo
- Definition of polygon shaped cargo
- Visual arrangement of cargo with drag-and-drop
- Automatic displaying of the documents, associated with single cargo units
- Visual alignment of centres of gravity
- User-extendable cargo types library (with cargo geometry definition)
- Lane/SECU-Loading, Top-loading, Multi-Loading in areas, Side-View-Loading
- Free rotation of cargo
- Loading checks (load capacity, dangerous cargo, overlapping, hit testing)
- Cutting stock optimization for available stowage area
- Zooming/scrolling, meter- and frame- rulers and grids

=== Crane Operation Module ===
- Simulates a crane operation in single or combined mode
- Visual presentation of the reach and the safe working load in a top view
- Ballasting using heeling tanks in shift tanks mode
- All relevant stability and strength criteria can be supervised during simulation
- Logging of crane motion and results

=== Bulk Carrier Modules ===
- Bulk strength for calculation of longitudinal strength in flooded condition according to IACS rule 17
- BULKLIM checks load limitations depending on the structure of the double bottom given by the class
- LoadMan for optimization of cargo in holds and loading / discharging sequences
- Grain Program for calculation of grain stability and reports, e.g. according to the National Cargo Bureau (United States of America)

=== Tanker Modules ===
- Proven Ullage Report including ASTM table based volume correction
- Vessel experience factor and cargo history
- Dangerous goods data base (IBC, CHRIS Code) printout of substance information page, cargo segregation and compatibility check
- MFAG code and EMS integration, emergency simulation and easy links to the information relevant for the actual loaded cargo

=== BallastMAN Ballast Water Exchange Module ===
- BallastMAN manages a ship's ballast water exchange on the high seas in accordance with IMO Resolution A.868 (20).
- Sequences of tank emptying and filling can be completely planned and executed, thus making sure that the exchange is carried out both safely and efficiently. During Planning Stage BallastMAN determines the fastest and safest sequence, continually calculating stability and longitudinal strength. During Execution Stage BallastMAN monitors the tank levels online, issues instructions when to operate pumps and valves and warns if a crucial deviation from the plan is detected.
- BallastMAN creates the Ballast Water Reporting Form required by U.S. Coast Guard / NBIC, AQIS and New Zealand

=== Voyage History ===
- Pre-calculates the changes in stability during a voyage resulting from the consumption of bunker
- Graphical and numerical history and reports

=== DastyMAN Damage Stability Calculation ===
- Deterministic damage stability calculation using the lost buoyancy method
- Required damage conditions as laid down by the classification society are calculated automatically when cargo or bunker has been changed
- The calculation results are checked against the appropriate IMO criteria, e.g. IBC-code, SOLAS

=== Online Program ===
- HSMS (Hull Stress Monitoring System) interface
- Interfaces to a wide range of tank automation systems
- Recurring automatic update of loading condition by the current tank readings
- Each tank may be switched online or offline individually

== Market Penetration ==
The onboard loading computer MACS3 is being used in a wide range of container vessels, multipurpose vessels, bulk carriers, tanker vessels, roro vessels and passenger vessels. Its ship library includes more than 7,500 ship profiles. For the container vessel segment, MACS3 holds a share of approximately 65%.

The MACS3 loading computer software has been in use for training purposes since 1999. Initially only available to Germany naval schools, it is now also deployed at European and Chinese maritime universities.
