= CargoMax =

Stability and load management software

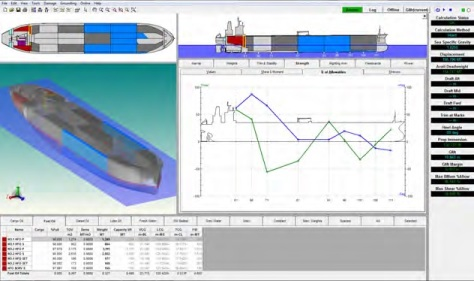
- CargoMax User Interface
- Developer: Herbert-ABS
- Initial release: December 1979
- Stable release: 2.1
- Operating system: Windows
- Website: www.herbert-abs.com/cargomax

CargoMax is a stability and load management software application for marine and offshore industries. It is developed and sold by Herbert-ABS Software Solutions, LLC. First released in 1979, CargoMax was one of the first computerized systems for planning and evaluating ship loading; it is currently one of the most-used software applications for this purpose. It helps determine cargo loading sequences by calculating stability and stress based on ship models created from vessel data: lightship weights, hydrostatic characteristics, tank data, and allowable shear forces and bending moments. Naval architects and engineers from Herbert-ABS customize each CargoMax installation using shipyard drawings and technical data. Different installations also include different sets of features from the program.

== History ==
The first version of CargoMax was developed for Microsoft DOS in 1979 by Herbert Engineering Corp. First releases in MS Windows were made in the late 1990s. For a time Herbert shared ownership of LoadMaster International and sold the CargoMax program under that banner. In 2001, Herbert re-acquired full rights to CargoMax to form Herbert Software Solutions, Inc., a wholly owned subsidiary of Herbert Engineering. In February 2011, Herbert Engineering and class society ABS formed a joint venture company, Herbert-ABS Software Solutions, LLC (Herbert-ABS) and Herbert Software Solutions became Herbert-ABS. Since then, program development, customer support, and marketing are carried out by Herbert-ABS. Herbert Engineering and ABS provides the technical support for CargoMax.

== Features ==
=== Direct Damage Stability Module ===
The CargoMax Direct Damage Stability (DDS) module allows tanker operators to load nonstandard cargos or non-standard configurations while ensuring that loading operations comply with requirements for damage stability, intact stability, and longitudinal strength. The DDS module allows the user to investigate the compliance of any given loading procedure and can be used to demonstrate compliance during flag state, port state, classification, or independent chartering inspections.

=== Grain Stability Features for Bulk Carriers ===
CargoMax implements recent supplemental requirements for vessels carrying bulk or grain cargo: a secondary strength evaluation and a damage stability evaluation. It provides a compliance report that includes the requirements for each cargo hold or set of holds, the actual loading for all holds, and a pass/fail status. To assess potential damages, the cargo in each hold is assigned a permeability, and the program simulates damage in each hold; the equilibrium waterline is calculated, and the amount of water flooding the hold is determined. The strength results for each damaged hold are compared with the requirement’s allowed strength, and an overall status is displayed. The program also allows the user to individually investigate the damage conditions for any hold. CargoMax has additional features to simplify the production of Grain Stability Reports for port authorities and dock managers. Based on information entered by the user, the program can provide reports according to several loading-report standards: the U.S. National Cargo Bureau, Trans-port Canada, and the Australian Maritime Safety Authority.

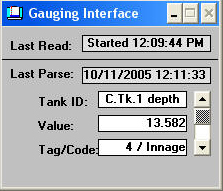
Gauging System Interface

=== Load / Discharge Sequencer Module ===
Each step in the load/discharge or ballast water exchange sequence can be evaluated to ensure that all relevant strength, stability, draft, or other criteria are met.

=== Interface with Tank Gauging System ===
CargoMax can be provided with a direct interface to various tank and draft gauge systems such as Ian-Conrad Bergan, SAAB, Autronica, Skarpenord and others. The interface allows CargoMax to automatically obtain information from the gauging system.

== Special Functions and Calculation Options ==
- Ullage or Sounding Entry with trim, heel and wedge corrections
- Interface to Tank Gauging System
- Cargo Oil Rate Screen and Loading History Log
- Marpol /International Bulk Chemical, IBC direct damage required GMt calculation
- Liquefied Gas Calculations (LNG/LPG)
- IMO 13G calculations for Hydrostatic Balanced Loading (HBL)
- Special ROB/OBQ reports
- Damage Stability Option
- Automatic Distribution of cargo Oil and Ballast
- Grain Stability Option
- Cargo Loading Restriction Checking
- Local Hull Girder Shear Force Adjustments per Class Rules
- Hull deflections
- Detailed Container Entry with Lashing Calculations
- Bulk Cargo Pile Geometry Calculations
- Detailed Bulk Cargo Buildup

== System requirements ==
CargoMax currently runs on Microsoft Windows desktop operating systems. Versions for Unix and Mac OS have never been released. Recommended system requirements are Microsoft Windows XP or higher and 200MB of RAM. The program is currently available in an English-language version only.

== Classification Societies Acceptance ==
Major classification societies including ABS, DNV, LR, NK, CCS, BV, RINA, GL have accepted and approved CargoMax. The program is Type Approved by Det Norsk Veritas and Lloyd’s Register. It has the only ABS class-approved IACS Type 3 System as specified in IACS URL 5.

== Associated Programs ==
Herbert-ABS has developed several related programs for type-specific enhancements. CruiseMax is a dedicated passenger ship loading and emergency support package. It expands the technology in HECSALV (the industry standard ship salvage software favored by large casualty response groups such as SMIT, the U.S. Coast Guard, Shell, BP, Germanischer Lloyd, and the U.K. Ministry of Defense). The first three of Mariotti’s Seabourn Odyssey Class of cruise ships will come equipped with CruiseMax (although they did get subsequently retrofitted with the competing NAPA Loading Computer software). Herbert launched CruiseMax at the Seatrade Cruise Ship exhibition in Miami, March 2009. Another associated program is LMP (Load Management Program), designated for semi-submersibles, TLPs, SPARs and FPSOs. LMP is a customizable program that can be configured to meet offshore Stability, Monitoring and Weight Management needs.

== See also ==
- Classification society
- Naval architecture
- Ship stability
- SNAME
