= MV Wakashio oil spill =

2020 oil spillage event on the Mauritius coast arising from a grounded bulk carrier

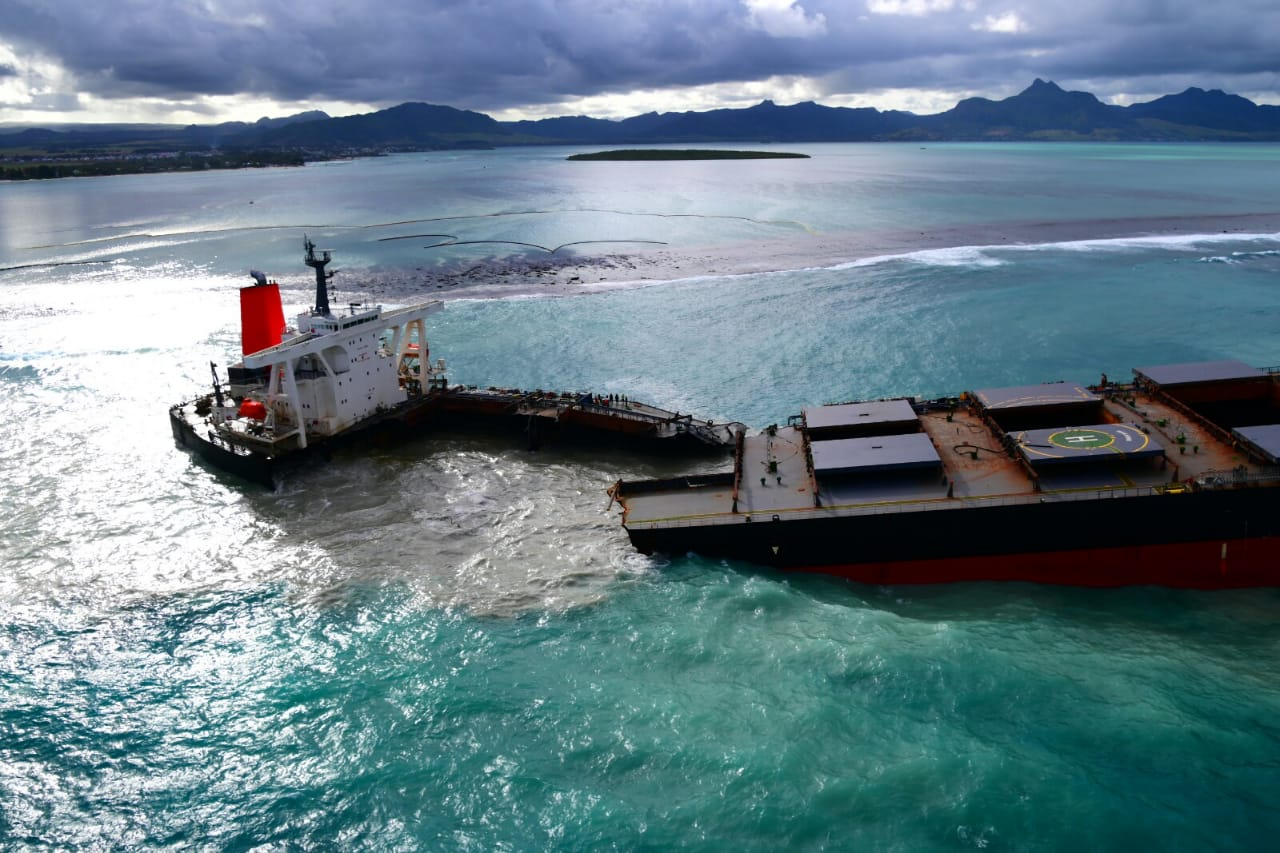
- MV Wakashio shortly after breaking in half
- Interactive map of MV Wakashio oil spill
- Location: Offshore of Pointe d'Esny, south of Mauritius
- Coordinates: 20°26′17.23″S 57°44′40.67″E
- Date: 25 July 2020

Cause
- Cause: Grounding of MV Wakashio
- Operator: Mitsui O.S.K. Lines

Spill characteristics
- Volume: 1,000 metric tons fuel oil
- Area: 27 km^{2} (10 sq mi)

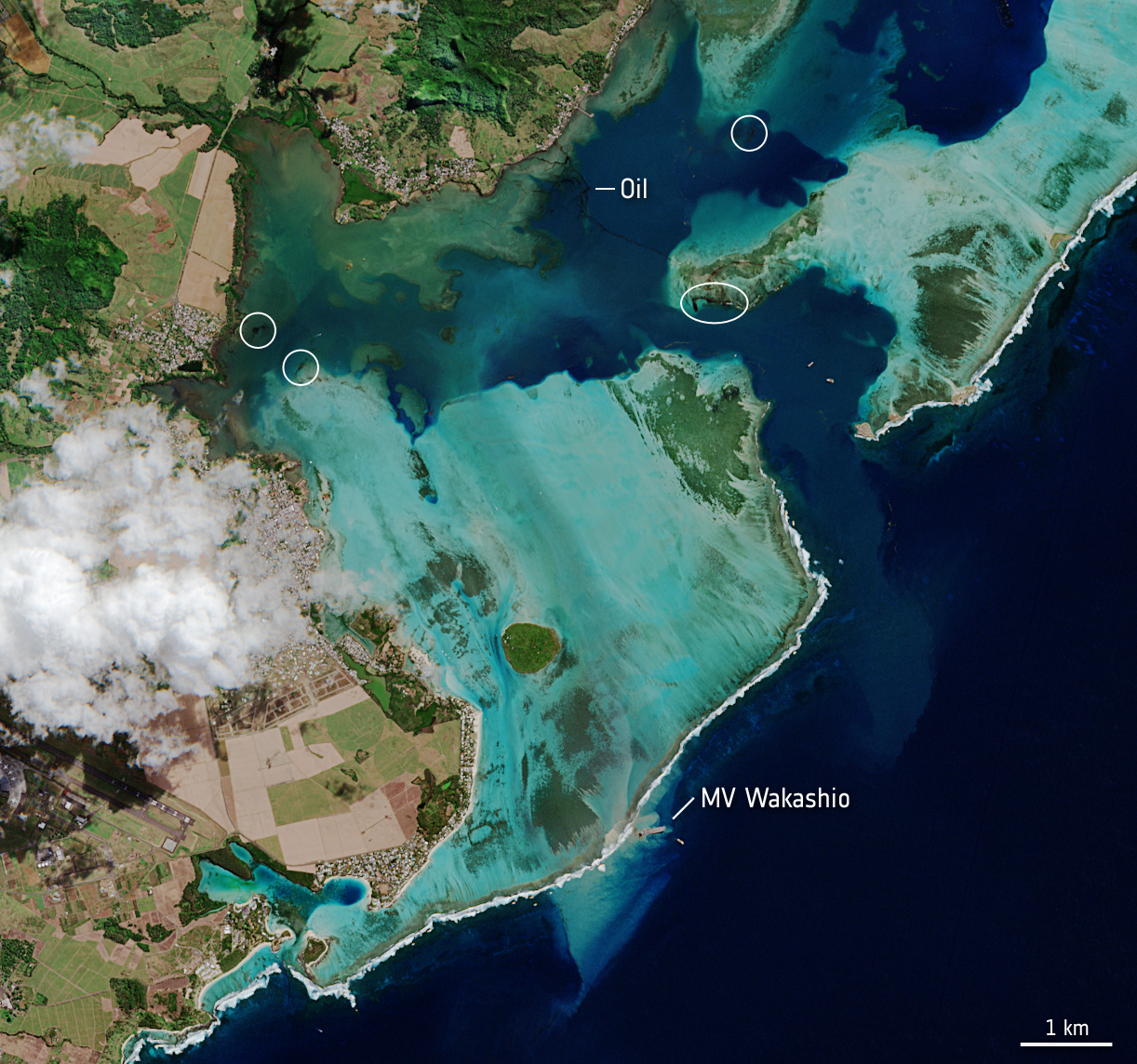
Satellite view of MV Wakashio oil spill and surrounding area (11 August 2020)

The MV Wakashio oil spill occurred on 25 July 2020 at around 16:00 UTC, when the Japanese-controlled bulk carrier MV Wakashio ran aground on a coral reef off the southern coast of Mauritius. The ship began to leak fuel oil and broke apart in mid-August. Although much of the oil on board was pumped out before she broke in half, an estimated 1,000 tonnes of oil spilled into the Indian Ocean in what some scientists deemed the worst environmental disaster Mauritius had ever seen. Two weeks after the incident, the Mauritian government declared it a national emergency.

== The ship ==
MV Wakashio, a large capesize bulk carrier, was built by Japan's Universal Shipbuilding Corporation in Tsu, Mie. She was laid down on 23 September 2004, launched on 9 March 2007, and was delivered on 30 May 2007. She had a deadweight tonnage of 203,000 tons, a length overall of 299.95 metres (984 ft 1 in), and a beam of 50 metres (164 ft 1 in). She was powered by a single diesel engine that gave her a service speed of 14.5 knots (26.9 km/h). The ship belonged to Okiyo Maritime Corporation, an associate company of Nagashiki Shipping, and was operated by Mitsui O.S.K. Lines.

At the time of her grounding, Wakashio was sailing under a Panamanian flag of convenience while under Japanese ownership. The ship was sailing without cargo. She departed from Lianyungang in China on 4 July, stopped in Singapore, and was scheduled to reach the Port of Tubarão in Brazil on 13 August. 20 crew members were on board, none of whom were injured. Japan's ClassNK inspection body said in a statement on 11 August that the ship had passed an annual inspection in March. Mitsui OSK said they doubted whether the incident would have a significant effect on their earnings.

== Incident ==
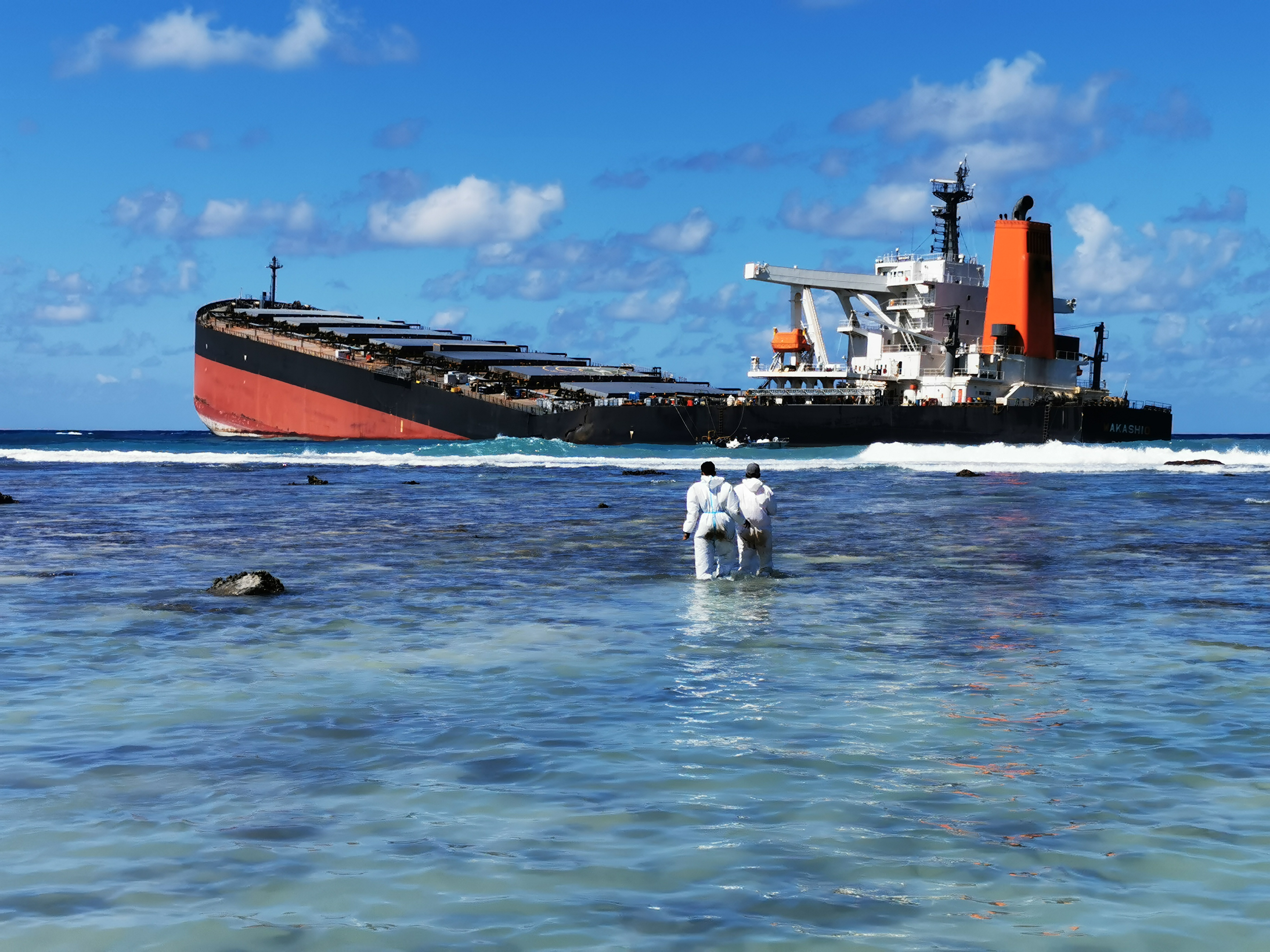
IMO workers in hazmat suits stand near the wreck on 13 August 2020

Wakashio ran aground on a coral reef on 25 July, but did not immediately begin leaking oil. Oil began to leak from the ship on 6 August, by which time Mauritius authorities were trying to control the spill and minimize its effects. They isolated environmentally sensitive areas of the coast while waiting for help from foreign countries to pump out an estimated 3,890 tons of very low sulphur-fuel oil. By 10 August, about 1,000 metric tons of fuel had spilled, with estimates of the remaining oil onboard ranging from 2,500 to 3,000 metric tons. High winds and 5 metres (16 ft) waves halted cleanup efforts on 10 August; visible cracks in the hull of the ship led to worries that the ship might "break in two," according to Mauritius' prime minister Pravind Kumar Jugnauth. Jugnauth said that 3,000 tons of oil had been pumped out of the ship's fuel reservoirs. Data from Finnish Iceye satellites indicated the spill had increased from 3.3 km^{2} (1.3 sq mi) on 6 August to 27 km^{2} (10 sq mi) on 11 August.

The ship broke up on 15 August when there were still 166 tons of fuel inside. Waves 4.5 metres (15 ft) high hindered cleanup. After she split, Wakashio's bow section was towed into the open ocean and scuttled on 24 August. Recovery operations continued around the stern section, which remained aground, and on 31 August a tugboat working on the wreck sank after colliding with a barge in heavy weather, killing at least three crewmembers. In October, a salvage contract for the remaining stern section of Wakashio, still grounded on the reef, was awarded to Lianyungang Dali Underwater Engineering of China, which planned to begin deconstruction in December and continue for at least several months.

According to investigators who conducted interviews with crew members, the crew had been celebrating the birthday of a sailor on board the ship at the time of the grounding, and the ship had sailed near shore to pick up a Wi-Fi signal. However, local police denied reports that the ship had sailed close to land seeking a Wi-Fi signal, saying that looking for a phone signal would not have required sailing so close to land. Plus, the ship's vessel operator, Mitsui OSK Lines, stated that their fleet had access to free and unlimited internet access. The ship then failed to respond to warnings of the errant course. The ship's captain, a 58-year old Indian national named Sunil Kumar Nandeshwar, and deputy captain were arrested on 18 August on suspicion of negligence in operating the vessel.

The grounding happened at an area which is listed under the Ramsar convention on wetlands of international importance and near the marine park of Blue Bay. Tourism plays a major role in the economy of Mauritius, accounting for about ₨ 63 billion (about US$1.51 billion) in spending in 2019, and is centered around marine scenery and animals likely to be endangered by the oil spill. Greenpeace stated that "[t]housands of species [...] are at risk of drowning in a sea of pollution, with dire consequences for Mauritius' economy, food security and health."

== Aftermath ==
=== Cleanup ===
Locals from around the island including fishermen and divers, and NGOs arrived as first responders to build absorbent floaters to prevent more oil spillage; they also helped with cleaning the affected shore area.

Prime Minister Pravind Kumar Jugnauth declared a "state of environmental emergency" and requested help from the international community.

On 11 August 2020, Indian Oil Mauritius Ltd (IOML) started to evacuate oil from the breached vessel onto the IOML barge Tresta Star, which had a capacity of 1,000 tonnes of oil.

India sent 30 tonnes (30 long tons; 33 short tons) of technical equipment and material to the country to help contain the oil spill as well as a 10-member team of the Indian Coast Guard specialising in containing oil spills. Graphene oil absorbent pads called 'Sorbene' pads, were used in the cleanup operation. These special pads were supplied by Mumbai-headquartered clean-tech startup Log 9 Spill Containment Pvt. Ltd. These Sorbene pads are able to absorb large volumes of oil and can be reused for up to 6-7 times so that the sorbents can provide more recovery of spilled oil.

French President Emmanuel Macron tweeted, "France is there. Alongside the people of Mauritius. You can count on our support dear Jugnauth." France sent both military and civilian equipment and personnel from its overseas territory of Réunion.

Local volunteers joined forces to remedy the situation by making cloth barriers stuffed with straw and human hair. Japan sent a six-member crew of specialists to help in the cleanup.

The United Nations Conference on Trade and Development said the spill "risks bringing devastating consequences for the economy, food security, health and tourism industry." The group also reminded countries about the importance of international legal instruments such as the HNS Convention for liability and compensation.

In August 2020, Japan P&I, the insurer of Wakashio, appointed two companies namely Polyeco SA and Le Floch Dépollution for the clean-up operations in the south east of Mauritius.

Spilled oil was collected and loaded onto barges for handling in Port Louis. On 31 August, a fatal accident occurred during a squall when the tug Sir Gaëtan Duval collided with its barge and subsequently sank; three of the eight-person crew were killed and one more was reported missing.

By early November, all surface oil had been removed from Mauritius waters, and restoration of the coastline was expected to be completed by early 2021.

On 15 December 2020, Polyeco SA announced that they completed the clean-up of 21 kilometres (13 mi) of shorelines namely Blue Bay, Pointe d'Esny, Preskil Hotel, Pointe Jérôme, Mahebourg Waterfront, Petit Bel Air, Anse Fauvrelle, Rivière des Créoles, Pointe Brocus, l'Île Aux Aigrettes, l'Île Mouchoir Rouge and l'Île des Deux Cocos.

A media tour was organized by Japan P&I Club on 14 January 2021 following clean-up operations in the south-east of Mauritius. The operations mobilized a total of 370 people over a period of 5 months. Some 1,300 cubic metres (46,000 cu ft) of liquid waste was pumped and treated at the Virgin Oil Ltd and Eco Fuel Ltd oil refineries, while 7,900 cubic metres (280,000 cu ft) of solid waste was extracted from the shorelines.

=== Anti-government protests ===
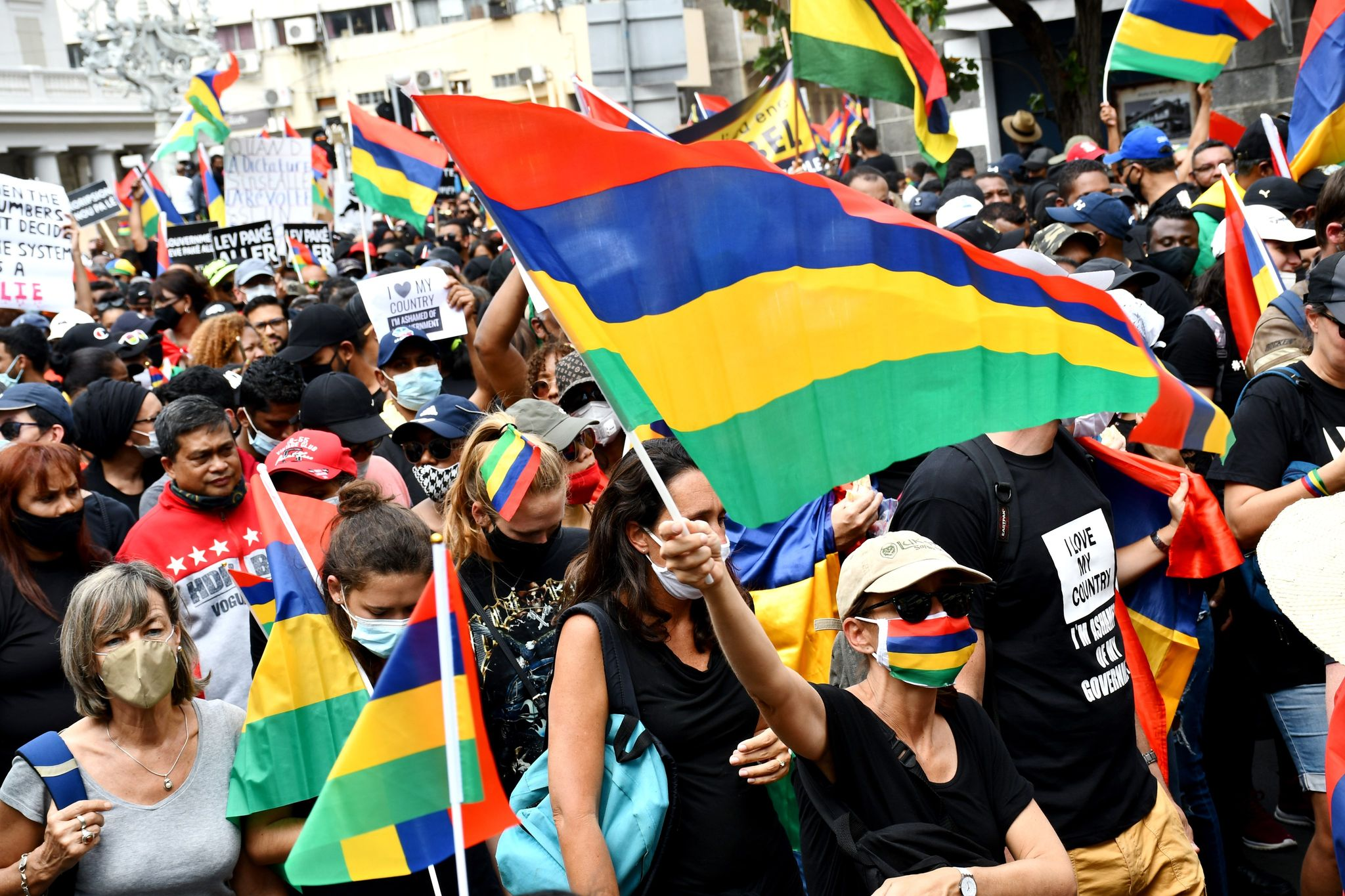
Port Louis protest (31 August 2020)

Perceived failure of the government to respond promptly and effectively resulted in protests. In Mauritius, thousands of protesters assembled in the capital Port Louis, focusing on the Prime Minister Pravind Jugnauth, including calls for the prime minister to step down. The Prime Minister has denied any responsibility. International protests, primarily led by Mauritian diaspora, also occurred in Canada, New Zealand, Australia, Switzerland, France, Luxembourg, Germany, and the UK.

The government has suspended the parliament, and has been accused of suppressing local media and preventing independent reporting regarding the incident, drawing sharp rebuke. Additionally, the government has been criticised for delegating critical decision-making to faceless and unaccountable 'advisors'.

=== Calls for shipping industry reform ===
The oil spill has, along with the 2020 Beirut explosion, brought into sharp contrast failures of the shipping industry, with critics highlighting lax attitude to operational safety. Shipping industry commentators and publications have also called for self-reflection by the stakeholders, including supporting the calls for increased shipping industry financial responsibility when it comes to disaster response and cleanup.

=== Court trial ===
Sunil Kumar Nandeshwar, captain, was found guilty under the 2007 Merchant Shipping Act by the Court of Investigation, Mauritius, and admitted to being moderately under the influence of alcohol. Further investigation found that the lookout officer had been allowed to stay at the birthday party which meant that he could not ensure the safe navigation of the ship. Nandeshwar publicly apologized for his actions, while first officer, Hitihanillage Subhoda Janendra Tilakaratna (also convicted) pled for leniency. The duo were sentenced on 27 December 2021.

In her ruling magistrate Ida Dookhy-Rambarun refused to commute the sentences to time served and ordered Captain Sunil Kumar Nandeshwar (aged 58) and second officer Hitihanillage Subhoda Janendra Tilakaratna (aged 45) to remain in prison for 4 additional months. Magistrate Ida Dookhy-Rambarun called their actions irresponsible when she imposed the 20-month sentences, adding that they failed to monitor their ship and became too distracted whilst looking for a Wi-Fi signal from shore to allow the crew to connect with families after being separated during the COVID-19 pandemic. They had both pleaded guilty to endangering safe navigation. Immediately after the 27 December 2021 court hearing, the port agent updated the two men's passports and travel documents to expedite their departures. Captain Nandeshwar returned to his family in Bhopal, central India and issued a statement thanking the Maritime Union of India (MUI), High Commission of India in Port Louis, Shipping Ministry of India, and External Affairs Ministry of India for their support. MV Wakashio's second officer Tilakaratna had been the watch officer and switched the vessel on autopilot. He admitted to failing to consult the vessel's echo sounder before hitting the reef, and also failed to object to the lookout not being present on the bridge of the doomed vessel. First officer, Robert Geonzon Secuya, and chief engineer, Pritam Singh, were released on 23 December 2021, after being detailed as potential witnesses in the trial.

=== Court of Investigation ===
A Court of Investigation was set up in 2022 to investigate the circumstances which led to the grounding of the MV Wakashio. The Court of Investigation submitted its report in 2022. The report was kept secret until 2025. The investigators concluded that the commander of the Mauritius National Coast Guard, Captain Manu, and several high-level officers have tried to cover-up the failure of both Pointe du Diable coastal surveillance radar system and Operations Room to maintain an efficient monitoring of the territorial waters. It also concluded that both the Mauritius National Coast Guard and the Mauritius Ministry of Environment failed to take prompt measures to prepare for the worst in the event that a major environmental damage could occur.

=== Environmental damage ===
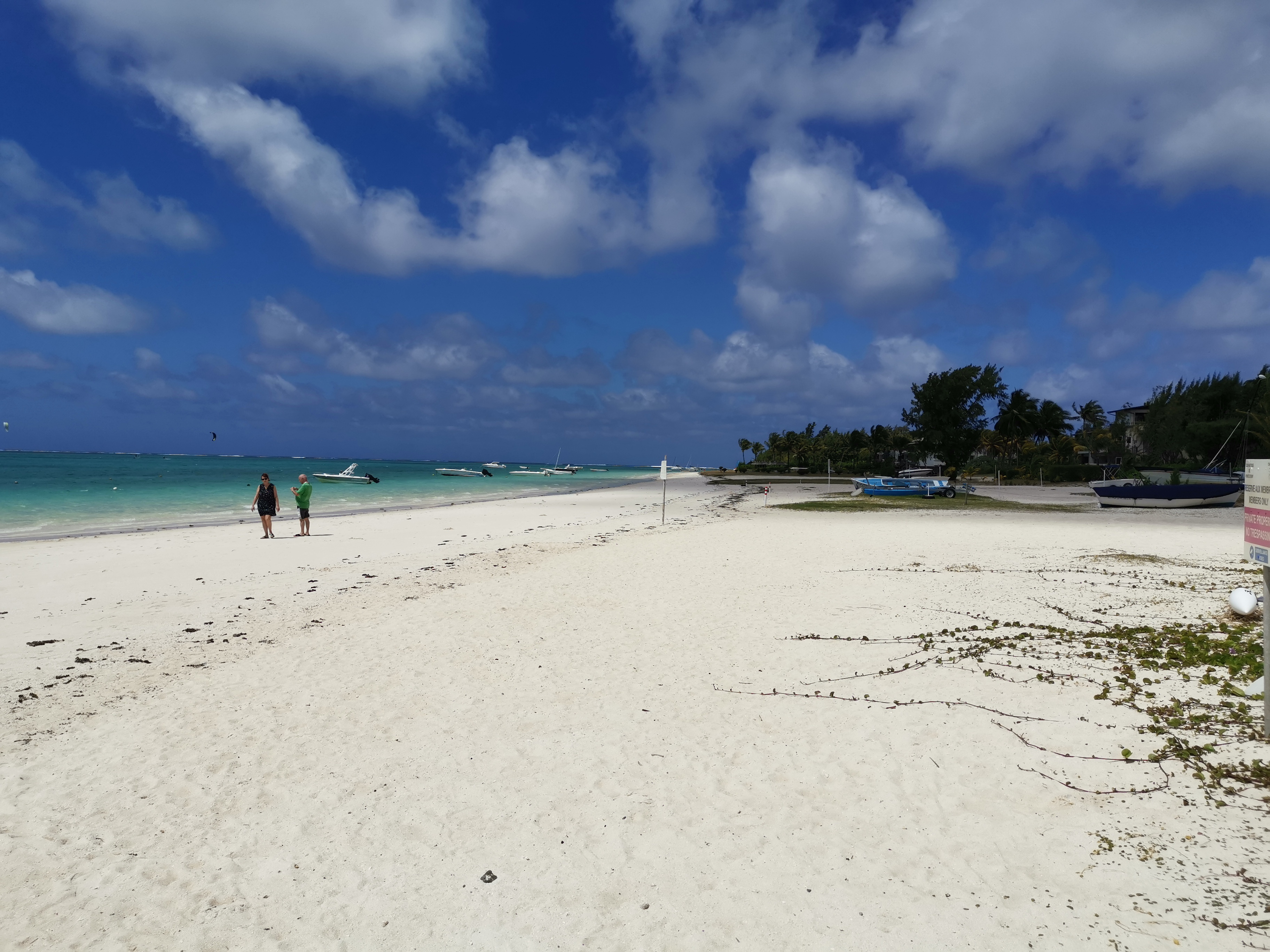
Pointe d'Esny beach before the oil spill

Oceanographer and environmental engineer Vassen Kauppaymuthoo said, "Around a little bit less than 50 percent of this lagoon is covered by environmentally sensitive areas, be it corals, be it seagrass, be it mangroves, be it entire mudflats, sand beaches and dunes, which is huge. Which confirms the sensitivity of this lagoon, in terms of oil spill." Ecotoxicologist Christopher Goodchild from Oklahoma State University said, "With this oil spill it looks like there is infiltration out of the mangroves, so you have the oily substance that can bind to organic matter or dirt and start to settle in and just being able to remove that toxic sediment can be a real challenge." Flakes of the damaged anti-fouling coating on the hull can also poison the marine fauna and flora on the reef and surroundings in a similar fashion to what occurred on the Great Barrier Reef. Reuters quoted unnamed scientists as saying that the spill was likely the worst environmental incident in the history of Mauritius, with effects possibly lingering for decades.

From 6 to 11 August, the spill expanded to over 26 square kilometres (10 mi^{2}). The island's environment minister Kavy Ramano, together with the fisheries minister, told the press that it was the first time that the country faced a catastrophe of this magnitude, and that they were insufficiently equipped to handle the problem.

Many dead sea mammals washed up on local beaches in the days following the spill, and more have been found seriously ill. Among the dead animals are dolphins and melon-headed whales.

== Compensation and cleanup funding ==
Mauritius requested compensation for the spill from Wakashio owner Nagashiki Shipping, which according to the International Convention on Civil Liability for Bunker Oil Pollution Damage is responsible for oil damage. The ruling treaty for the circumstances of the incident is the 1976 Convention on Limitation of Liability for Maritime Claims, which prescribes a maximum payout of ¥2 billion (about US$18.7 million) in the original draft to which Mauritius is a signatory, and ¥7 billion (about US$65.6 million) according to a 1996 amendment signed by Japan. Wakashio is insured by the Japanese P&I Club for up to US$1 billion; the agency said it expected to pay at least some portion of the cost of the recovery effort.

On 2 September 2020, Mauritius also asked Japan to pay US$34 million in reparations for the disaster; the island nation demanded the money to "support local fishermen whose livelihoods were adversely impacted by an oil leak last month", according to a Mauritian government document.

The ship's operator/charterer, Mitsui O.S.K. Lines, pledged ¥1 billion (about US$9.37 million). The Mauritius Natural Environment Recovery Fund will "fund environmental projects and support the local fishing community". The president of MOL cited the payment as their "social responsibility" while apologizing for the damage. MOL also expects that ship owner Nagashiki Shipping will contribute to the Fund.

The local NGO, No To Poverty, said that MV Wakashio oil spill incident was an act and/or combination of acts that endanger/s the health, life, property, morals or comfort of the public or obstruct the right of the public in the exercise or enjoyment of rights common to all and the locals shall be treated fairly for compensation. No To Poverty's president expressed worry that more efforts will be given for the cleaning up and the negative economic impacts of the oil spill which is worsening the poverty situation on the island ignored.

== See also ==
- Katrina P oil spill
- 2020 El Palito oil spill
- List of oil spills
