= Stowage plan for container ships =

Methods of organizing and loading containers

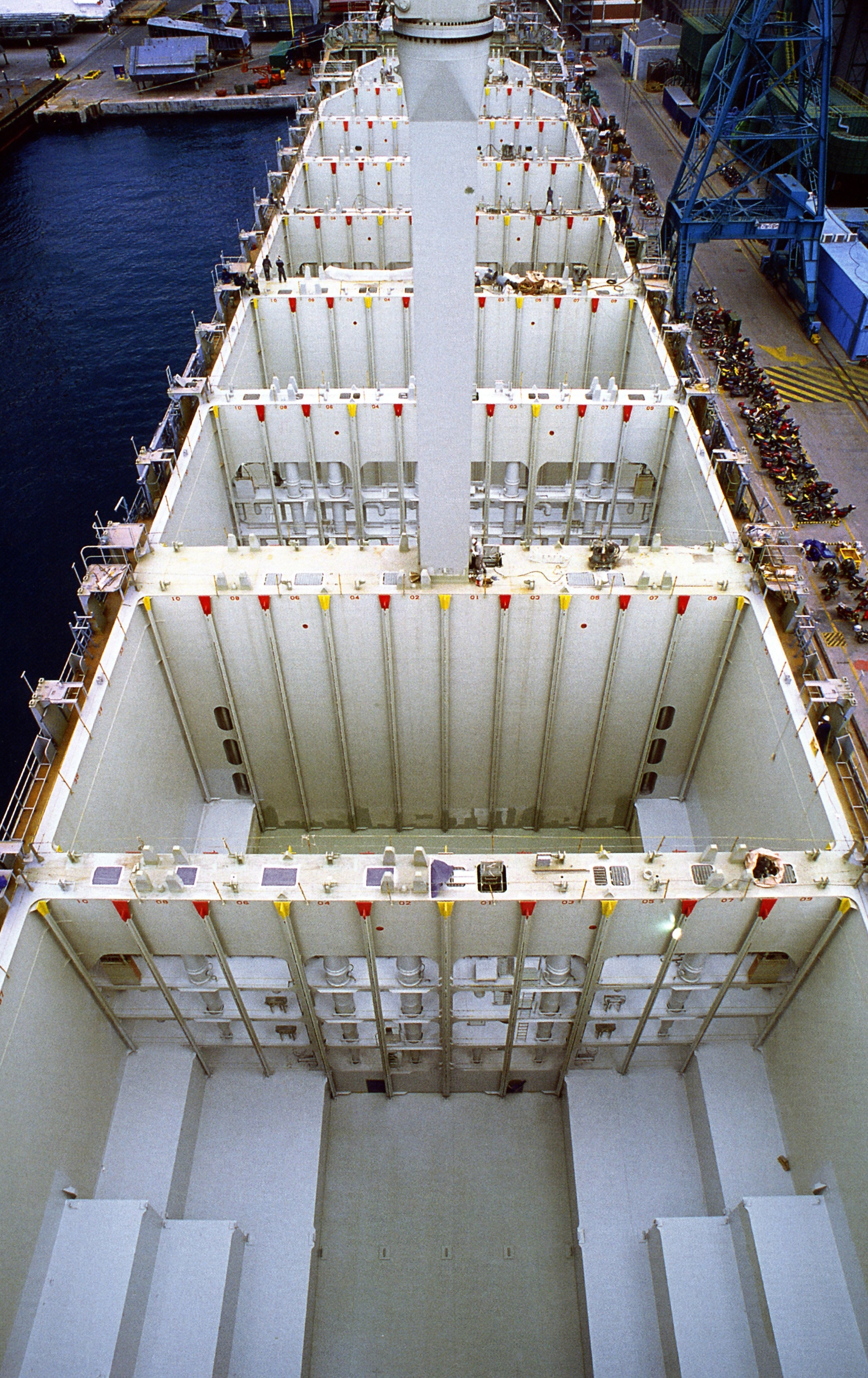
The holds of a container ship

Stowage plan for container ships or bay plan is the plan and method by which different types of container vessels are loaded with containers of specific standard sizes. The plans are used to maximize the economy of shipping and safety on board.

== Purpose ==
In order to maximize the economy of handling and shipping of containers on a container ship, stowage plans, sometimes known as bay plans, have become essential in the shipping trade. The plans are also vital for safety on board the ship and it is recommended that personnel working on ships are familiar with them. Modern stowage plans are executed by computer programs using mathematical calculations similar to those used for solving complicated Tetris problems. One such system of programs is the MACS3, Cloud CASP, CASP.

== Containers and ship sections ==
The most common and noted type of containers are the 20 feet and 40 feet containers. There are also containers with an extent in height called "High Cube" containers. The fixed exterior dimension of the standard size boxes are:

- 20 feet container size is: 20 ft (6.1 m) length by 8 ft (2.4 m) width by 8.6 ft (2.6 m) height.
- 40 feet container size is: 40 ft (12 m) length by 8 ft (2.4 m) width by 8.6 ft (2.6 m) height.

Container vessels are built to contain as many containers as possible, accordingly the vessels are divided into sections:

- Accommodation, the space which contains all crew cabins
- Bridge, the command center of the ship, the space which contains steering wheel, telegraph, radars, ECDIS, charts for navigation and publications
- Engine room, the space which the engine and machines can be served, maintained
- Generator
- Fuel tanks
- Water ballast tanks
- On-deck
- Hatches
- Cargo holds (below deck)

The cargo hold and on-deck are the spaces where the cargo, stored in containers, is kept.

=== Stowage terms ===
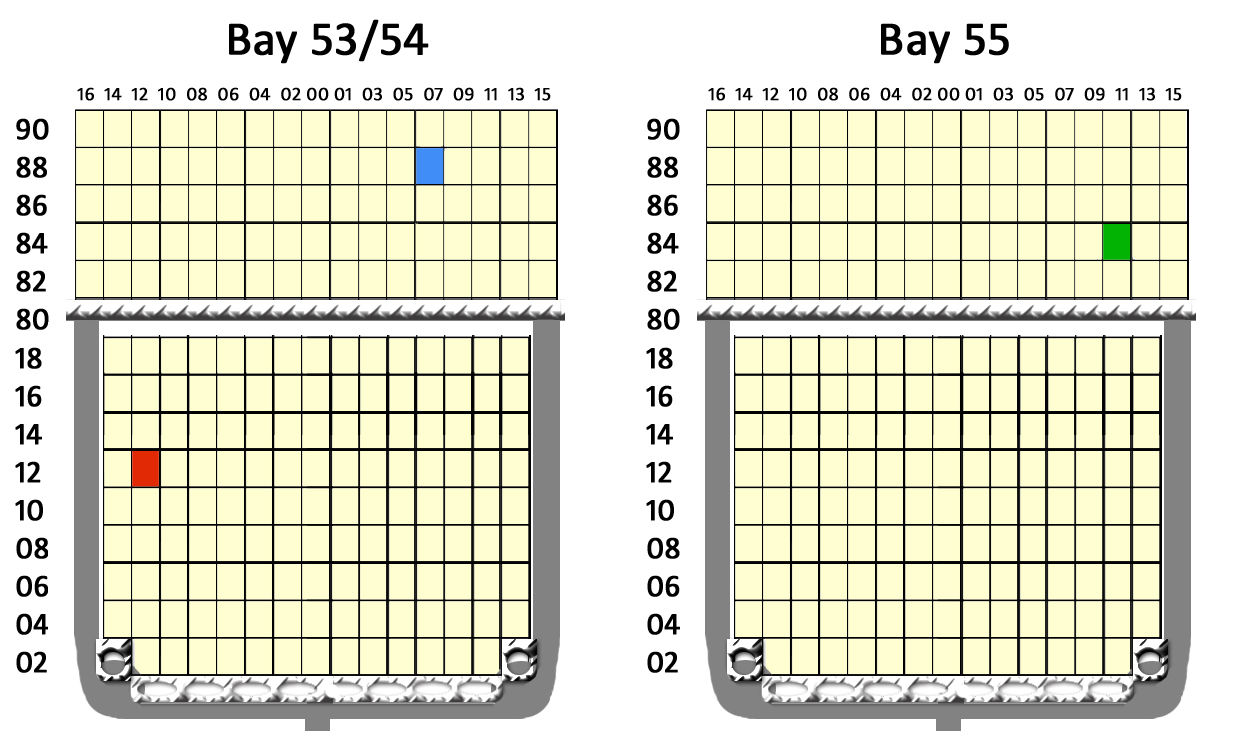
Example: Bay 53-55 is for 20 feet containers, bay 54 is for 40 feet containers

Bay-Row-Tier stowage system for container ships. Six digit code represents a precise volume of the ship.

On container ships the position of containers are identified by a bay-row-tier coordinate system. The bays illustrate the cross sections of the ship and are numbered from bow to stern. The rows run the length of the ship and are numbered from the middle of the ship outwards, even numbers on the port side and odd numbers on the starboard side. The tiers are the layers of containers, numbered from the bottom and up.

- Bay – a space on the ship that can hold containers, container ships have several bays, these bays are divided into two parts: on-deck and under-deck (hold). If the bay number is odd it is suitable for 20 feet containers, if the bay number is even it is suitable for 40 feet containers.
- Container slot, position or cell – names of the spaces that containers can be loaded in. On a stowage plan their positions are identified by a six-digit coordinate number: Bay-Bay-Row-Row-Tier-Tier.

In the example image the position coordinates of the containers are:

- Blue container; 530788
- Red Container: 531212
- Green container: 551184

== Preloading planning ==
In order to stow the cargo on a vessel, planners have specific computer programs to aid them. Planners use ports of call and vessel schedule to adjust vessel's route in the planning program. To plan the stowing the following parameters are essential:

- Vessel route
- Ports of call
- Vessel schedule
- Current cargo in the vessel, in an EDI format called BAPLIE
- Expected cargo to load

After that, planners get discharge lists/plans in the form of an EDI file (the COPRAR) and send information to the container terminals for all the re-stows (discharging containers and re-loading them) which may be required for completing the discharge process. Planners will also classify the loading data according to the kind of cargo in the containers as well as the size and shape of the containers and their destinations. Each container is marked with a series of numbers and codes to identify the container's operator, specifications and what kind of cargo it may hold. The parameters are:

- Refrigerated cargo - Any cargo that needs to be kept at a certain temperature, usually kept cold via refrigeration.
- Dangerous cargo - Cargo that fits one of the 9 types of dangerous cargo, as defined by the International Maritime Dangerous Goods Code, which includes categories such as explosives, radioactive materials, and others which could be potentially harmful to the crew.
- Out of gauge cargo - Cargo which does not fit into a standard shipping container.
- Dry hide container - Cargo containing hides or leather.
- Port of discharge
- Cargo weight
- Container size
- Hatch cover clearance
- Visibility

The stowage plan shows cross sections of the ship bay by bay, to indicate where all the containers should be loaded. The plans change with each port of call as container are discharged or re-stowed and new containers are taken on board.

=== Cargo units ===
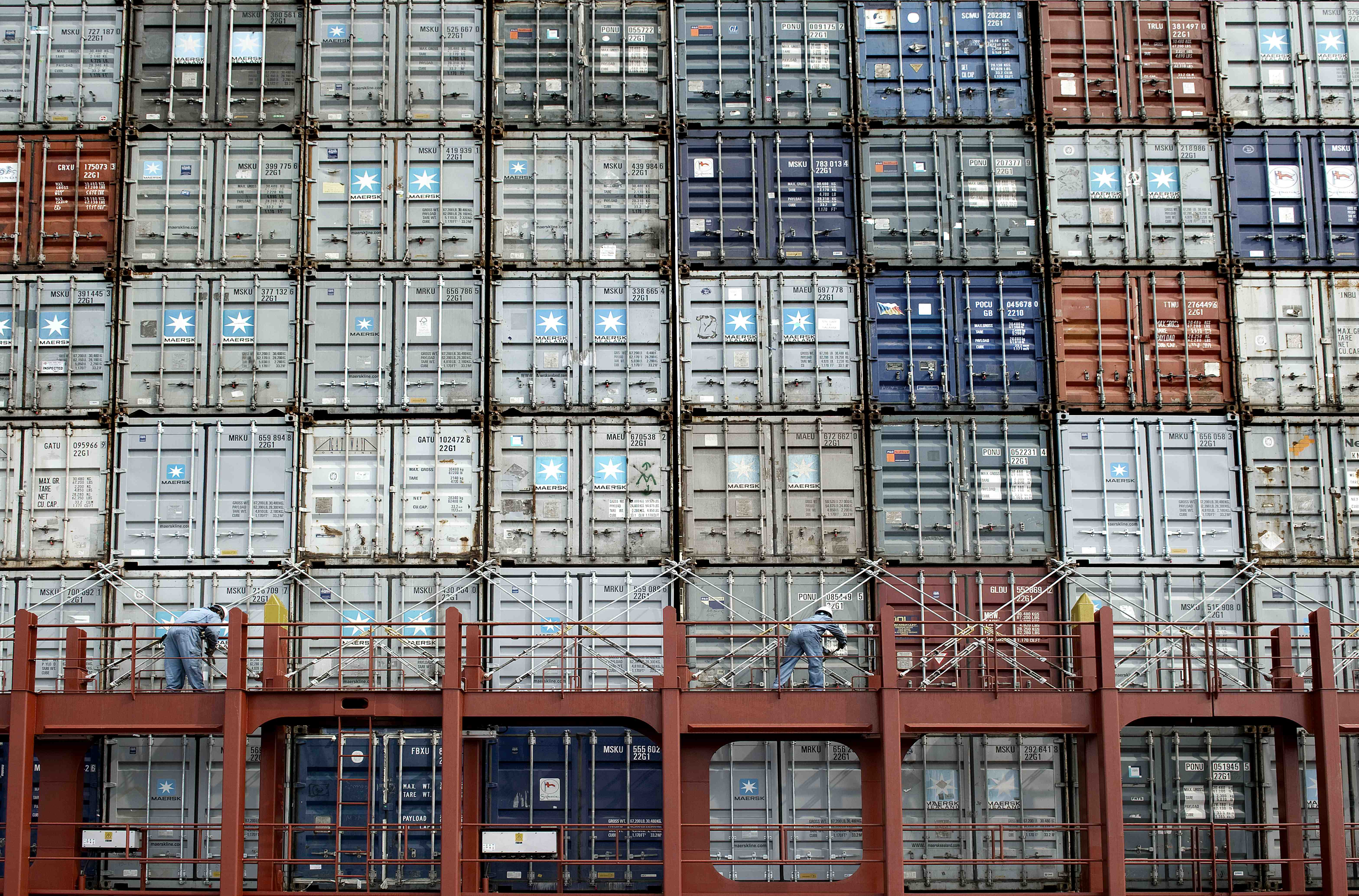
Container stack on Edith Maersk

Refrigerated cargo units – Container vessels are equipped with power source for specific places to plug in the refrigerated containers known as "reefers", hence, the reefer containers places are known and are usually the first type of containers to consider in the stowage plan.

Dangerous cargo – Containers where certain segregation rules must be followed, for example dangerous cargo that should be kept away from direct sunlight, from reefer container's motors, of some kind of another dangerous cargo or segregated away from all of the above. Accordingly, planners start with reefer units then continue with dangerous cargo units when planning the vessel.

Out of gauge cargo – For most international shipping, cargo that cannot be packed within a 40' high cube container is out of gauge. It may be possible to pack such cargo in specialty containers. Open top containers are suitable for too-tall cargo and flat rack containers can accommodate over height, over width or over weight cargo. Container platforms can handle over height, width or length cargo, but require slings to load and unload. Also out of gauge for most ships are containers between 45' and 53' long used in some countries for domestic rail and truck transport. These loads are usually added after planning all other containers and are usually stowed on top of other containers (on deck or in hold) as the planners strive to minimize the number of "lost slots" (unused positions) as much as possible.

Dry hide containers – Normal containers packed with cargo that may result in some leakage (such as liquid from fresh leather), they are usually stowed in outer row/first tier in order to make the necessary arrangements in case of leakage.

Dry cargo containers – Usually stowed according to next port of calls depending on container size and weight of cargo, the heavy weights below and the lighter weights on top.

=== Logistical factors ===
Port of discharge – When trying to find a suitable stowage position for containers, the planners must take into consideration the sequence of the ports of call. For example, if the port of calls are A, B and C, for the port A discharge, the planner must take into consideration not to choose a stowage position for a container for ports B or C on top of the container destined for port A.

Container size – A 20 feet container can not be loaded up on a 40 feet container, but the reverse is possible if the vessel structure allows it. Planners can also load a 40 feet container on top of two units of 20 feet container, this is known as a "Russian stowage" or "mixed stowage".

Hatch cover clearance – Hatch cover clearance refers to how many "High Cube" (height over 8.6 ft (2.6 m)) containers allowed to load in the hold without preventing the hatch cover from closing correctly.

Visibility – The number of High cube containers shouldn't exceed a set number of High cube containers in each row/bay on-deck. If the number of high cube units exceeded the set number it will prevent the full/clear line of sight of the ship from the bridge or other vital vantage points.

=== Additional factors ===
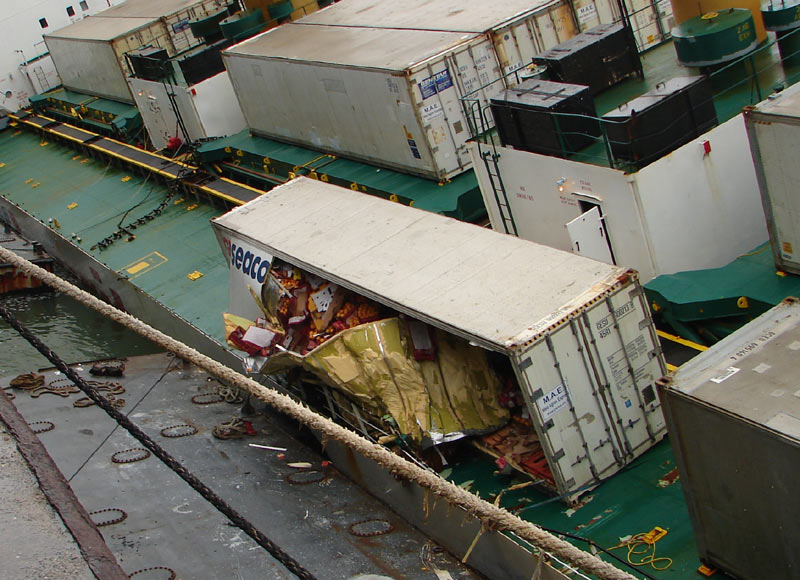
A badly executed stowage plan may cause the cargo to shift and cause damages as the ship lists.

Other factors included at stowing are:

- Vessel stability. The weight of the cargo should be evenly distributed in the ship. For example, extra heavy weight units should not be stowed in the port side and light weight units in starboard side, but should stow it tier by tier starting with similar weights to avoid any problem may accrue in stability.
- Stack weights violation. Each bay/row has a stack weight that should not be exceed as it may cause damage to other containers or vessel structure.
- Weight inversion. Weight inversion should be avoided; heavier cargo should be stored below lighter cargo.
- Unused slots under deck should be avoided and the planning should be done from bottom to top.
- Decrease lashing force.

== Discharging ==
Once a ship has arrived in port, other plans for handling, sorting and storage at the terminal go into operation.

== Problems ==
As stowage plans are transmitted electronically as data files between ships and terminals, they can be intercepted by modern pirates working with organized crime syndicates. These attacks are called Major Criminal Hijacks (MCH) or South China Sea Piracy; pirates board the ship with good knowledge of its layout and where the most coveted cargo is stowed.

== See also ==
- Rolling highway
- Roll-on/roll-off
- Roll-on/roll-off discharge facility
