= IMDG =

IMDG may refer to:

- International Maritime Dangerous Goods Code
- In-memory data grid, such as Hazelcast
- An imidazol molecule
