= Antiroll tanks =

Part of a ship

Antiroll tanks are tanks fitted onto ships in order to improve the ship's response to roll motion. Fitted with baffles intended to slow the rate of water transfer from the port side of the tank to the starboard side and the reverse, the tanks are designed such that a larger amount of water is trapped on the higher side of the vessel. This is intended to reduce the roll period of the hull by acting in opposition to the free surface effect. They can be broadly classified into active and passive antiroll tanks.

== Passive antiroll tanks ==
=== Free surface tanks ===
A single partially filled tank that extends across the full breadth of the vessel. Its shape, size and internal baffles allow the liquid inside to slosh from side to side in response to the roll motion of the ship. The phasing of the roll moments acting on the ship and the resultant liquid motion will be such that it reduces the roll motion. This type of tank was first investigated by William Froude, but did not receive much attention until the 1950s when it was revived and used in many naval vessels. They have the added advantage that it is possible to vary tank natural frequency by changes in water level and thus accommodate changes in a ship's metacentric height. Free surface tanks are commonly referred to as "flume" tanks.

=== U-tube tanks ===
The use of these tanks was pioneered by Herr H. Frahm in Germany at the start of the 20th century and they are often referred to as Frahm tanks. These partially filled tanks consist of two wing tanks connected at the bottom by a substantial crossover duct. The air columns above the liquid in the two tanks are also connected by a duct. As in the free surface tanks, as the ship begins to roll the fluid flows from wing tank to wing tank causing a time varying roll moment to the ship and with careful design this roll moment is of correct phasing to reduce the roll motion of the ship. They do not restrict fore and aft passage as space above and below the water-crossover duct is available for other purposes.

=== External stabilizer tanks ===
This was another concept introduced by Frahm and used in several ships in the early 1900s. In this concept the two wing tanks are connected only by an air duct at the top. Water flows in and out of each tank via an opening in the hull to the sea. This eliminates the need for a crossover duct as in the other designs, but has its own set of disadvantages. This design promoted corrosion of the tanks due to the explicit interaction with sea water. The holes on the hull cause resistance to forward motion. The force required to accelerate sea water outside the ship (which is initially at rest) to the speed of the ship as it enters the ship is a substantial drag component (momentum drag) as its magnitude increases with the square of ship speed. More recently, a variation of these tanks has been used in oil drilling rig applications where forward motion is of little relevance.

== Controlled passive antiroll tanks ==
=== Active u-tube tanks ===
This is similar to a U-tube tank but the water crossover duct is much larger and the air crossover contains a servo-controlled valve system. Since this valve controls the flow of air very little power is required. When the valve is closed, passage of air from one tank to the other is prevented and the resulting compression of air in the tank prevents flow of water also. When the valve opens, free movement of water and air is possible.

== Active antiroll tanks ==
The border between controlled-passive and active stabilisation is not that distinct. Active stabilisation generally implies that the system requires the use of machinery of significant power and the system must be much more effective in reducing roll in order to justify this high cost.

=== Active tank stabilizer ===
This concept utilises an axial flow pump to force the water from one side of the ship to other rather than allowing it to slosh as in passive systems. Webster (1967) studied the design of such a tank in detail. The main disadvantage to this is that when the pump is operated there is a time lag for a sizeable amount of fluid to arrive at a tank, thus limiting instant roll stabilization. Hence, compared to fin stabiliser systems, this is highly inefficient.

=== Active tank stabilizer with energy recovery ===
Instead of consuming energy to control the flow inside the tank, this concept utilises a water turbine to produce electricity using the water that sloshes into the tank as in passive systems. The main advantages to this are operating cost reduction by replacing part of fuel consumption and control of water flow without any mechanical mobile device.

== See also ==
- Gyroscopic internal stabilisers
- Slosh dynamics
