= International Code for the Safe Carriage of Packaged Irradiated Nuclear Fuel, Plutonium and High-Level Radioactive Wastes on board Ships =

The International Code for the Safe Carriage of Packaged Irradiated Nuclear Fuel, Plutonium and High-Level Radioactive Wastes on board Ships, often abbreviated and referred to as the INF Code is an International Maritime Organization (IMO) Code for the facilitation of the maritime transport of radioactive cargoes and nuclear waste on ships.

== History ==
The current regulations are derived from the International Atomic Energy Agency (IAEA) Regulations for the Safe Transport of Radioactive Material, 1961. In 1993, the Code was published as a voluntary standard and was adopted by the IMO in 1995. It was then amended in November 1997. In 1999 amendments were adopted to the SOLAS Convention to make the code mandatory under SOLAS Chapter VIII. It became mandatory for all ships carrying nuclear fuel in January 2021.

The Code has been amended since by IMO resolutions MSC.118(74), MSC.135(76), MSC.178(79) and MSC.241(83).

== Contents and application ==
The code applies to ships that carry nuclear fuel, plutonium and other radioactive wastes. It includes recommendations for the design of ships and on issues such as fire protection and damage ship stability. Ships are designed according to three classes INFl, INF2 and INF3, which are determined by the maximum level of aggregate radioactive cargoes that can be carried, with INF3 the highest. Radiaoctivity is measured in tera Becquerels. The Code also sets out requirements for temperature control of cargoes, electrical supplies, cargo securing and radiological protection.

Ships are required under the code to develop and carry a shipboard emergency plan in accordance with associated IMO Assembly guidelines (A.854).

The INF Code is designed to be used alongside that of the International Maritime Dangerous Goods Code with regards to nuclear cargoes (UN numbers under Class VII).

The Code has been adopted by numerous countries (flag States), including the Netherlands, the United Kingdom and Bermuda.
