= National Cargo Bureau =

American not-for-profit organization

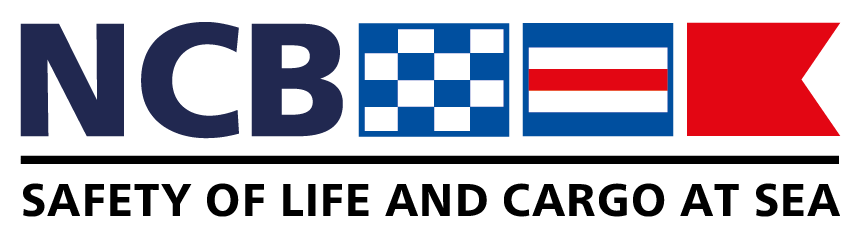

The National Cargo Bureau (NCB) a not-for-profit marine surveying organization charged with assisting the U.S. Coast Guard with carrying out the provisions of the International Convention for the Safety of Life at Sea. The NCB was formed by a group of marine underwriters and the Coast Guard for the purpose of reducing losses of grain ships. Any ship loading grain in the US sailing for a foreign port must have a certificate issued by the NCB in order to sail( See U.S. Coast Guard Navigation and Vessel Inspection Circular No. 5-94 - NVIC 05-94 ). The NCB acts with and enforces the regulations of the Coast Guard in this area. Grain ships have unique stability issues and are prone to capsize if loaded improperly. Headquartered in New York City, the NCB has offices throughout United States.

== National Cargo Bureau Services ==
National Cargo Bureau, Inc. conducts inspections and surveys that are incidental to the loading or discharging of a ship, and issues the appropriate certificates and/or survey reports. Some of the services that National Cargo Bureau, Inc. provides are:

=== Surveying and Certifying Cargo Securing, Loading, and Stowage ===
- The loading, stowage and securing of general cargo on and under deck, including special surveys of heavy or large items.
- The stowage of bulk grain cargoes, including vessel suitability and arrangements.
- The stowage of explosives, and packaged and bulk hazardous cargoes in accordance with the requirements of the Code of Federal Regulations, including pre-loading and shipboard temperatures and the loading and stowage of metal borings, shavings, turnings and cuttings.
- The stowage of one or more concentrates and/or dry bulk cargoes in accordance with the IMO Code of Safe Practice for Bulk Cargoes.
- Inspection of cargo compartments for cleanliness and condition prior to loading at another port or for charter purposes.
- Discharge of various bulk cargoes, including cleanliness of receiving railroad cars, barges, handling of equipment, etc.
- Stowage of cargo in barges including LASH and SEABEE.

=== Volume and Weight Calculations ===
- Cargo and space measurement surveys.
- Determination of tonnage of cargo loaded on or discharged from ships or barges by immersion computation.
- Condition of cargo and packaging at point of origin and/or prior to being loaded, including stowage.
- Witness tank soundings of ships and barges, including the computation of the quantity of liquids in tanks.

=== Container Inspections ===
- Inspections and certification of containers and road vehicles for transportation under Customs seal.
- Condition of the container for suitability to receive any particular cargo.
- Stowage of the cargo in the container.
- Inspection of containers for handling damages (Damaged Cargo Surveys).
- Inspection of containers for leasing purposes.
- Inspection of the securing of containers on deck.
- Inspection of containers loaded with hazardous cargo for compliance with U.S. Coast Guard regulations and/or International Maritime Dangerous Goods Code.
- Out of gauge and flat rack securing in accordance with CSS Annex 13.

=== Hazardous Material Related Services ===
- Inspection of containers loaded with hazardous cargo for compliance with U.S. Coast Guard regulations and/or International Maritime *Dangerous Goods Code.
- Consultation service to ensure proper completion of the Dangerous Cargo Manifest.
- Training in applicable regulations
- Radioactive and Explosive Cargo Inspections

=== Other Cargo Related Services ===
- General planning and consultation services concerning any of the above cargo-related problems.
- Special cargo and/or safety inspection of specific requirements of governments, ship operators, insurance companies or shipper.
- Surveys of import and export unboxed automobiles.
- On-hire, off-hire, and condition surveys of cargo compartments and handling gear.
- Hatch surveys, including condition of cargo prior to, during, and after discharge.
- Witnessing of tests and certification of shipboard cargo gear (accredited by U.S. Coast Guard and U.S. Department of Labor).
- The approval on behalf of governmental administrations of vessel plans for the stowage of bulk grain cargoes under the existing international regulations.

=== Vessel Safety Inspections ===
National Cargo Bureau inspectors are authorized to conduct vessel Safety Inspections on behalf of the following flag administrations:

- Antigua and Barbuda
- Bahamas
- Barbados
- Luxembourg
- Marshall Islands
- Vanuatu

These inspections are carried out in order to assist these flag administrations in meeting their international obligations to provide oversight of vessels trading under their flags.

=== Incident Investigations ===
National Cargo Bureau personnel may conduct preliminary incident or casualty investigations on behalf of flag administrations, liaising with other parties of interest as appropriate.

=== Miscellaneous Representation ===
National Cargo Bureau personnel may be called upon to attend on board and provide advice on behalf of various flag administrations for a wide variety of purposes, including:

- Delivery of Flag Administration documents
- Endorsement of Flag Administration documents
- Issuance of Carving and Marking notes
- Liaising with U.S. authorities in the event of an incident
- Liaising with USCG in the event of a negative Port State Control inspection
- Flag Administration detention when serious deficiencies are identified and not rectified in a timely manner

=== National Cargo Bureau Training ===
- Courses in Hazardous Materials Regulations.
- On site Shipboard Training Courses in Hazardous Materials Regulations.
- USCG approved Distance Learning Courses in Hazardous Materials Regulations
- Containerization Courses
- Placard Recognition Courses
- Vessel Stowage & Segregation Courses
- International Maritime Solid Bulk Cargoes (IMSBC) Code (replaces the Code of Safe Practice for Solid Bulk Cargoes)
- National Cargo Bureau also offers the following United States Coast Guard (USCG) approved Distance Learning courses:
- Hazardous Materials
- Ship's Stability Courses
- Damage Stability Courses
- Stability For Fishermen Courses
- Grain Loading

(Training is available at their offices, on-site, and on-line)
