= International Convention on Civil Liability for Bunker Oil Pollution Damage =

International Convention on Civil Liability for Bunker Oil Pollution Damage (BUNKER)feati
- Signed: 23 March 2001
- Location: London, United Kingdom
- Effective: 21 November 2008
- Signatories: 84
- Ratifiers: 90
- Depositary: International Maritime Organization
- Languages: English

The International Convention on Civil Liability for Bunker Oil Pollution Damage (BUNKER) is an International treaty listed and administered by the International Maritime Organization, signed in London on 23 March 2001 and in force generally on 21 November 2008. The purpose is to adopt uniform international rules and procedures for determining questions of liability and providing adequate compensation.

In the convention, Bunker Oil is fuel used to power the ship. The convention covers leakage of that oil, and requires signatories to the convention to have their ships appropriately insured against such leakages.

It is associated with and references:

- United Nations Convention on the Law of the Sea
- International Convention on Civil Liability for Oil Pollution Damage (CLC [Convention])
- International Convention on Liability and Compensation for Damage in Connection with the Carriage of Hazardous and Noxious Substances by Sea (HNS Convention)
- International Convention for the Prevention of Pollution from Ships (MARPOL)

While BUNKER is apparently similar to CLC Convention – they are substantially different. Unlike the CLC, the BUNKER Convention is not limited to persistent fuel oils and will apply to any hydrocarbon used to operate the ship.

== State parties ==
While the convention has been widely adopted, notable exceptions include Bolivia and Honduras — which are generally flag of convenience states—have not ratified the treaty. As with the CLC, the United States of America was a driver behind the BUNKER convention, and had legislation in place similar to BUNKER provisions, the Oil Pollution Act of 1990, hence it claimed, the treaty did not need to be signed.

As of November 2018, the treaty has been ratified by 90 states.
