= International Code on Intact Stability =

The International Code on Intact Stability (IS Code) is the International Maritime Organization (IMO) standard for ship stability.

== History ==
The Code for Intact Stability was first issued in 1993 under IMO resolution A.749(18)).

In 2008, the Code was updated by the IMO.

In December 2019, amendments to the Code were adopted that entered into force on 1 January 2020. These amendments related to ships engaged in anchor handling operations and to ships carrying out lifting and towing operations.

== Content ==
The Code contains both mandatory regulations and recommended provisions, setting out the minimum stability standards for ships. This includes information on precautions against capsizing, metacentric heights (GM), righting levers (GZ), rolling criteria, Free surface effect and watertight integrity.

The 2008 version of the Code details guidelines on Second Generation Intact Stability for ships, specifically criteria for dynamic stability and damage assessment.

The Code is split into two parts. Part A contains mandatory criteria. Part B contains additional guidelines and recommendations. The Code requires each ship to have a stability book on the ship. For passenger ships, a regular survey is required.
