= International Convention on Civil Liability for Oil Pollution Damage =

1969 international maritime treaty

The International Convention on Civil Liability for Oil Pollution Damage, 1969, renewed in 1992 and often referred to as the CLC Convention, is an international maritime treaty administered by the International Maritime Organization that was adopted to ensure that adequate compensation would be available where oil pollution damage was caused by maritime casualties involving oil tankers (i.e. ships that carry oil as cargo).

== Liability ==
The convention introduces strict liability for shipowners.

In cases when the shipowner is deemed guilty of fault for an instance of oil pollution, the convention does not cap liability.

When the shipowner is not at fault, the convention caps liability at between 3 million special drawing rights (SDR) for a ship of 5,000 GT to 59.7 million SDR for ships over 140,000 GT.

The 2000 Amendments

Adoption: 18 October 2000

Entry into force: 1 November 2003

The amendments raised the compensation limits by 50 percent compared to the limits set in the 1992 Protocol, as follows: For a ship not exceeding 5,000 gross tonnage, liability is limited to 4.51 million SDR (US$5.78 million) For a ship 5,000 to 140,000 gross tonnage: liability is limited to 4.51 million SDR plus 631 SDR for each additional gross tonne over 5,000 For a ship over 140,000 gross tonnage: liability is limited to 89.77 million SDR

The HNS Convention to compensation for damages occurring from spill of dangerous goods is based on the same legal framework.

== Insurance ==
If a ship carries more than 2000 tons of oil in cargo, CLC requires shipowners to maintain "insurance or other financial security" sufficient to cover the maximum liability for one oil spill

== Coverage ==
As of September 2016, 136 states, representing 97.5 per cent of the world fleet, are contracting parties to the CLC Protocol of 1992, which amends the original CLC Convention. Bolivia, North Korea, Honduras, and Lebanon—which are generally flag of convenience states—have not ratified the treaty.

The United States of America is not a signatory to CLC, despite considerable involvement in its formulation. This is due to significant nation legislation such as the Oil Pollution Act, 1990, so signing the CLC was deemed unnecessary.

== See also ==
- International Convention on Civil Liability for Bunker Oil Pollution Damage
- United Nations Convention on the Law of the Sea
- International Convention on Liability and Compensation for Damage in Connection with the Carriage of Hazardous and Noxious Substances by Sea (HNS Convention)
- International Convention for the Prevention of Pollution from Ships (MARPOL)
