= Stowage =

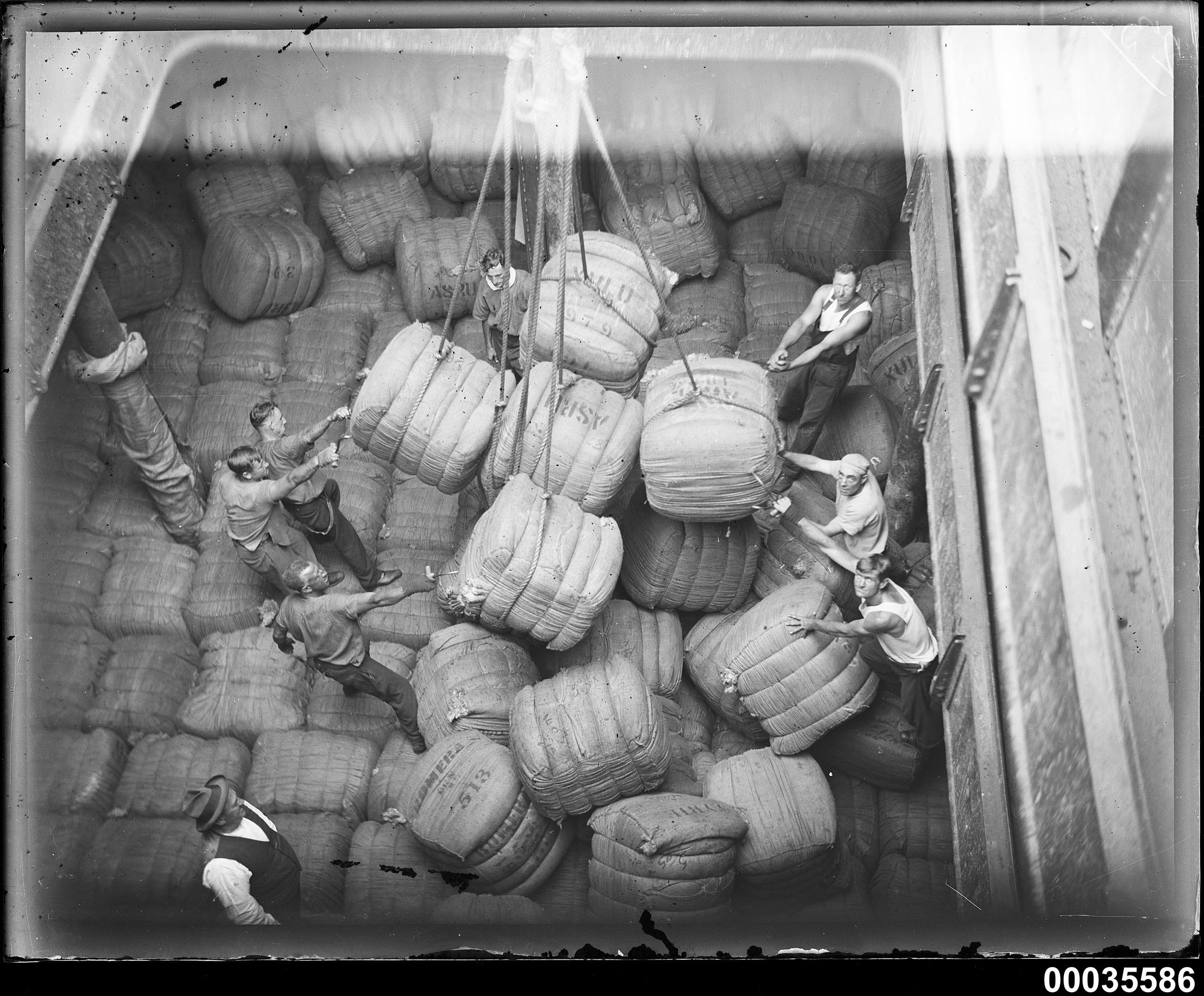
A cargo hold (1933)

In nautical terminology, stowage is the amount of room available for stowing materials aboard a ship, tank or an airplane.

In container shipping, stowage planning refers to the arrangement of containers on board a container vessel. The stowage of a container ship involves different objectives, such as to optimize the available space and prevent damage to the goods, and more importantly, to minimize the time the vessel spends at the port terminal. Containers will be arranged depending on their destinations (those going to the first port calls in the schedule will be placed on top), cargo weight (lighter containers are stored on top of heavier ones), cargo nature (dangerous goods containers normally are placed at the end of ship, and on upper deck to minimize the loss, in case of fire or leakage), etc.

In the past, this process was done by the ship's captain, merely based on his experience. Today, it has become more automated with optimization software.
