= Free surface effect =

Effect of liquids in slack tanks

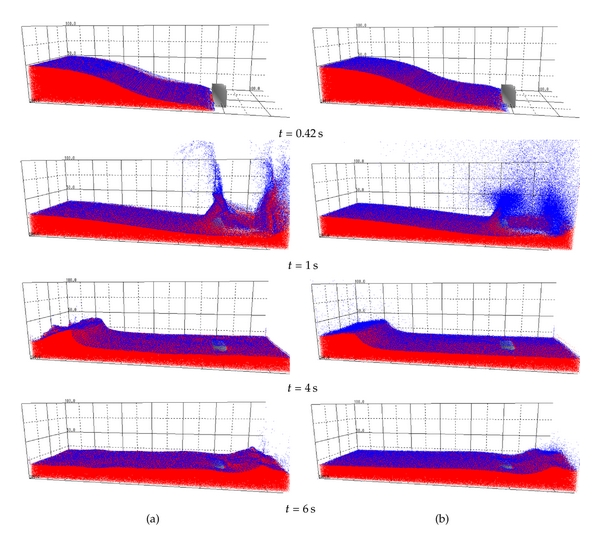
A liquid hitting a wall in a container will cause sloshing.

The free surface effect is a mechanism which can cause a watercraft to become unstable and capsize.

It refers to the tendency of liquids – and of unbound aggregates of small solid objects, like seeds, gravel, or crushed ore, whose behavior approximates that of liquids – to move in response to changes in the attitude of a craft's cargo holds, decks, or liquid tanks in reaction to operator-induced motions (or sea states caused by waves and wind acting upon the craft). When referring to the free surface effect, the condition of a tank that is not full is described as a "slack tank", while a full tank is "pressed up".

== Stability and equilibrium ==
In a normally loaded vessel any rolling from perpendicular is countered by a righting moment generated from the increased volume of water displaced by the hull on the lowered side. This assumes the center of gravity of the vessel is relatively constant. If a moving mass inside the vessel moves in the direction of the roll, this counters the righting effect by moving the center of gravity towards the lowered side. The free surface effect can become a problem in a craft with large partially full bulk cargo compartments, fuel tanks, or water tanks (especially if they span the full breadth of the ship), or from accidental flooding, such as has occurred in several accidents involving roll-on/roll-off ferries.

If a compartment or tank is either empty or full, there is no change in the craft's center of mass as it rolls from side to side (in strong winds, heavy seas, or on sharp motions or turns). However, if the compartment is only partially full, the liquid in the compartment will respond to the vessel's heave, pitch, roll, surge, sway or yaw. For example, as a vessel rolls to port, liquid will displace to the port side of a compartment, and this will move the vessel's center of mass to port. This has the effect of slowing the vessel's return to vertical.

The momentum of large volumes of moving liquids cause significant dynamic forces, which act against the righting effect. When the vessel returns to vertical the roll continues and the effect is repeated on the opposite side. In heavy seas, this can become a positive feedback loop, causing each roll to become more and more extreme, eventually overcoming the righting effect leading to a capsize. While repeated oscillations of increasing magnitude are commonly associated with the free surface effect, they are not a necessary condition. For example, in the cases of both the SS Normandie and MS al-Salam Boccaccio 98, gradual buildup of water from fire-fighting caused capsizing in a single continuous roll.

== Mitigation ==
To mitigate this hazard, cargo vessels use multiple smaller bulk compartments or liquid tanks, instead of fewer larger ones, and possibly baffles within bulk compartments or liquid tanks to minimize the free surface effects on the craft as a whole. Keeping individual bulk compartments or liquid tanks either relatively empty or full is another way to minimize the effect and its attendant problems. Hydraulic tankers use water to displace lighter oil to keep the tank full at all times. Tanks or compartments that do not straddle the vessel's centerline are somewhat less prone to destabilising oscillations. Similarly, narrow compartments (aligned bow to stern) and compartments at the extremes away from the centerline are less prone to cause instability.

== Historical examples ==
Flooding, liquid cargo leakage, or unintended water (from precipitation, waves, or hull damage) in a compartment or on a deck of a watercraft, and the resulting free surface effect is often a contributing cause of accidents, capsizes, and casualties e.g. the loss of TEV Wahine (Wellington, New Zealand, April 1968), Herald of Free Enterprise (Zeebrugge, Belgium, March 1987), and MS Estonia (Baltic Sea, September 1994). In the case of the RORO ferry al-Salam Boccaccio 98 (Red Sea, February 2006), improper fire-fighting procedures caused flooding leading directly to instability and capsize. In both the cases of the al-Salam Boccaccio 98 and Costa Concordia, severe listing followed immediately after the ship had undergone a hard turn, causing unstable volumes of water (from collision damage in the latter) to surge from one side of the ship to the other.

== Effects on land and aircraft ==
The free surface effect can affect any kind of vehicle, including watercraft (where it is most common), bulk cargo or liquid tanker semi-trailers and trucks (causing either jackknifing or roll-overs), and aircraft (especially fire-fighting water-droppers and refueling tankers where baffles mitigate but do not eliminate the effects). The term "free surface effect" implies a liquid under the influence of gravity. Slosh dynamics is the overarching field which covers both free surface effects and situations such as space vehicles, where gravity is inconsequential but inertia and momentum interact with complex fluid mechanics to cause vehicle instability.

== Regulation ==
To reduce the effects of free surface effect potentially capsizing a ship, regulatory requirements apply to all ships internationally under the SOLAS Convention and the International Code on Intact Stability.

== See also ==
- Metacentric height
- Slosh dynamics
