= China Classification Society =

- 中国船级社

- Seal of the China Classification Society
- Abbreviation: CCS
- Formation: original: 1956; 70 years ago; current: 1993; 33 years ago
- Type: Ship classification
- Headquarters: Chuanjian dasha, Dongzhimen Dajie Nan No.9, Beijing
- Region served: Global
- Members: International Association of Classification Societies
- Director General: Sun Feng (孙峰)
- Parent organization: Ministry of Transport
- Staff: 5,500
- Website: http://www.ccs.org.cn/

The China Classification Society (CCS) is a state-owned enterprise directly under the Ministry of Transport of the People's Republic of China, in charge of the classification of ships and offshore installations. It was originally established in 1956 as a ministry bureau, and was reorganized as a corporation in 1993. The CCS is one of the 13 formal members of the International Association of Classification Societies. It is headquartered in Beijing.

== History ==
CCS was founded as the Ship Registration Bureau on 1 August 1956, and began ship inspection and supervision tasks that year. On 1 June 1958, the Ship Registration Bureau was renamed the Ship Inspection Bureau.

After reform and opening up, the need for ship inspection and certification services soared, as did international interactions. For this purpose, the Ship Inspection Bureau adopted an "external name", China Classification Society, on 1 August 1986, and started operating abroad as a corporation in the ship inspection business.

In 1988, the China Classification Society joined the International Association of Classification Societies (IACS) as full member. On the same year, the Suez Canal Authority put CCS-certified ships in its whitelist of vessels exempted from inspection.

In 1994 CCS was awarded the quality system qualification certificate by the International Classification Society, giving international parity to its classification services. In the same year, CCS classification was included in the London & International Insurance Brokers Association list of accepted classes, allowing ships classified by CCS the same preferential insurance treatments as the other top classification societies.

In 1998, as part of a large reform of China's water transport management system (which created the CMSA) and the implementation of the "Separation of agencies and social organizations" policy, the CCS was disestablished as a bureau and incorporated as a state-owned non-profit corporation. It became the only authorized national ship classification entity, under the supervision of the CMSA Ship Inspection Bureau.

With China's exploding presence in international shipping, the CCS started to expand abroad, opening overseas bureaus in many countries. This expansion continues today. In November 2009, it established the CCS London Maritime Centre, covering European business. On 10 February 2025, CCS opened an office in Doha.

By 2016, the CCS had reached 100 million tonnes of certified gross tonnage in 2016, and in early 2024 it reached 200Mt of certified gross tonnage. As of September 2024, CCS had surveyed over 36,000 ships totaling 203 million GT.

== Organization ==
CCS operates directly and through its subsidiaries, CCS Certification and CCS Industrial, and carry out rules research at its research subsidiaries, the CCS Shanghai Rules & Research Institute, the CCS Wuhan Rules & Research Institute, and the Offshore Engineering Technology Center.

As of 2025, CCS had over 120 branches and offices, and 5,500 employees. The Society main domestic branches are in Dalian, Qinhuangdao, Tianjin, Qingdao, Jiangsu, Shanghai, Zhejiang, Fuzhou, Guangzhou, Hainan, Chongqing, Wuhan, and Hong Kong., with 60 subordinate main offices. It also has five plan approval centers at Shanghai, Wuhan, Jiangsu, Dalian, and Guangzhou.

CCS has also established international branch bureaus in Pusan, Dubai, Osaka, Singapore, New York, London, Hamburg, Athens, and Cape Town, which supervise 31 subordinate offices and inspection stations.

== Operations ==
The scope of operations of the CCS includes:

1. Formulating and updating the classification norms and technical standards for ships and offshore facilities;
2. carrying out the classification inspection, verification inspection, and certificates inspection of ships, offshore facilities, containers, and related industrial products. Issue the corresponding certificates;
3. representing any commissioning PRC government agencies (mostly the MSA) in technical matters of ship construction, design, and inspection at the IACS and the International Maritime Organization (IMO);
4. carrying out statutory inspections when authorized by flag authorities. (Note: these include the Flag State obligations mandated by a variety of international treaties, such as the SOLAS, Load Lines, MARPOL, and MLC conventions) By the end of September 2024, CCS had been authorized as a "recognized organization" (RO) by 62 flag states or regions to survey the ships and offshore installations flying their flag;
5. certifying the Safety management system (SMS) of ships and of shipping companies, according to the IMO's ISM Code and ISPS Code;
6. carrying out neutral inspection and certification surveys (公正检验) when entrusted by third parties;
7. providing plan approval services to shipbuilders;
8. conducting research and testing on safety technologies and classification standards;
9. certifying the quality assurance system standards according to ISO 9000;
10. providing technical advice and technical services for the safe operation and environmental standards of ships and maritime facilities. CCS issues rules and guidelines (over 70 published in 2024 alone), technical services, and risk assessment services;
11. publishing ship inspection and survey records and certificates.
