= Korean Register of Shipping =

Korean Register
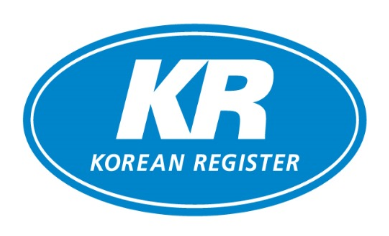
- Company type: Nonprofit organization
- Industry: Classification society
- Founded: 1960
- Headquarters: Busan, Korea
- Services: Classification; System certification Naval services Industry services
- Website: Korean Register

The Korean Register (KR) is a not-for-profit classification society founded in South Korea offering verification and certification services for ships and marine structures in terms of design, construction and maintenance. Founded in 1960, the society employs more than 1000 people. Its headquarters is in Busan and it has 72 offices worldwide.

KR is a full member of the International Association of Classification Societies (IACS) which is the trade association of major global classification societies.
