= Permeability (nautical) =

Percentage of empty volume in a ship

Permeability of a space in a ship is the percentage of empty volume in that space. It is represented by the symbol μ, and represents the percentage of volume of the space which may be occupied by seawater if the space is flooded, with the rest occupied by machinery, cargo, or other non-water objects. Permeability is used for ship survivability and damage stability calculations in ship design.

Permeability is sometimes split into two related concepts: volume permeability (the ratio of the floodable volume to the total volume of the compartment) and surface permeability (the ratio of the floodable surface to the total surface area of the compartment, used for calculating moments of inertia of the free surface area).

== Damage stability calculations ==
Calculation of permeability is given by:

$0.85 + 0.1\frac{a-c}{v}$ for machinery spaces, and

$0.63+0.35\frac{a}{v}$ for spaces not in line with machinery spaces, where:

- a represents the volume of passenger spaces,
- c represents the volume of between-deck spaces, and
- v represents the volume of the total space under consideration.

In all cases, volume is only measured below the margin line of the ship (a safety line defined as 76 millimetres (3.0 in) below the deck of the bulkhead).

Permeability is significant in calculating the floodable length, or the length of ship that needs to be flooded starting at a given point along the ship in order to cause the ship to sink to the waterline, using Shirokauer’s method. Standardized values of permeability are used to calculate the total volume of the flooded compartment, and thus the floodable length, from the change in water displacement caused by flooding that compartment.

== Typical values ==
The International Bulk Chemical (IBC) Code, standardized by the International Maritime Organization (IMO), provides some typical values:

- 0.95 for voids (empty spaces) and living spaces
- 0.85 for machinery spaces
- 0.60 for spaces allocated to cargo or stores

The IBC Code also specifies that spaces intended for storage of other liquids have permeability values constrained by the proportion of the space filled with that liquid, but not exceeding 0.95 in the case of an empty space.

Based on these typical values for damage stability calculation purposes, machinery spaces (for instance) are considered only 15% full with machinery by volume (100% - 85% = 15%).

== Legislation and regulations ==
In the United States, Title 46 of the Code of Federal Regulations specifies permeability values for voids (0.95), machinery spaces (0.85), and cargo spaces (0.60).

In the United Kingdom, Maritime and Coastguard Agency Merchant Shipping Notice 1715 similarly provided permeability values for damage stability calculations.
