= HNS Convention =

Environmental treaty

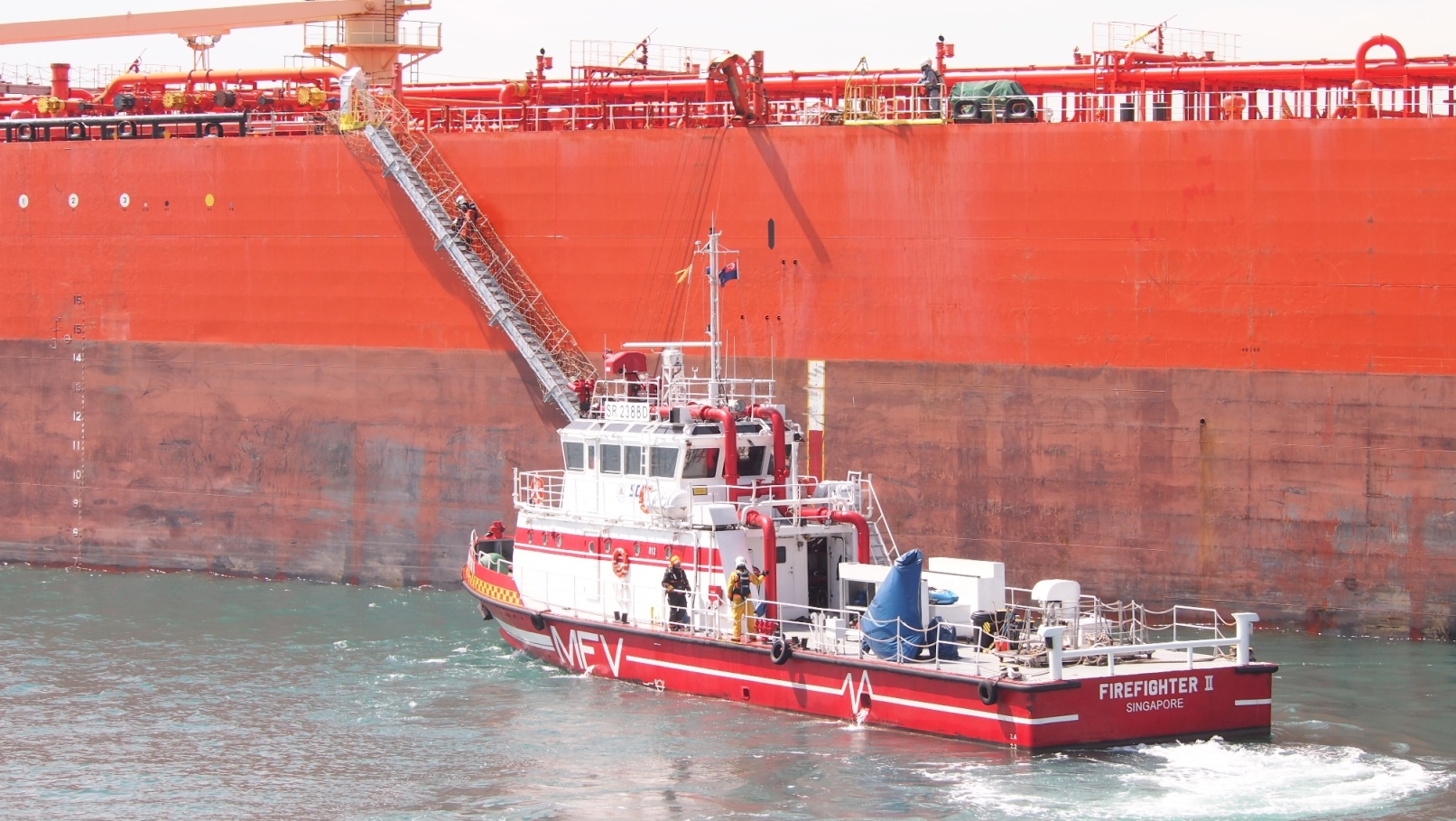
Chemical spill simulation, Singapore, 2013

The HNS Convention (Hazardous and Noxious Substances by Sea Convention) is an international convention created in 1996 to compensate for damages caused by spillage of hazardous and noxious substances during maritime transportation. The convention is officially known as the International Convention on Liability and Compensation for Damage in Connection with the Carriage of Hazardous and Noxious Substances by Sea, 1996. The convention has not entered into force due to signatory states not meeting the ratification requirements. Canada, France, Germany, Greece, the Netherlands, Norway, and Turkey signed the 2010 protocol to the convention.

== History ==
In May 1996, the International Maritime Organization organized an international conference in London, where states adopted the HNS Convention. The convention is based on the model of the 1992 International Convention on Civil Liability for Oil Pollution Damage, which covers pollution damage caused by spills of crude oil from tankers.

In 2009, the convention had still not entered into force due to an insufficient number of ratification. In 2010, a second international conference adopted a protocol to the convention, which came to be known as 2010 HNS Protocol. The protocol was designed to overcome some implementation problems that had discouraged states from ratifying the original convention.

== Scope ==
An HNS is a substance such as chemicals, which could threaten humans and marine life and interfere with legitimate uses of the sea, if spilled in the sea. HNS is considered dangerous goods. Under the convention, it does not include crude oil. Whether a substance is hazardous or noxious is determined by its inclusion in the number of conventions and codes of the International Maritime Organization developed to protect maritime safety and environment. For example, the substances listed under International Maritime Dangerous Goods Code are considered HNS. The lists and codes include several thousand substances. Many substances are covered under more than one category.

- Oils, as defined in regulation 1 of annex I to MARPOL 73/78 (carried in bulk)
- Noxious liquid substances, as defined in regulation 1.10 of Annex II MARPOL 73/78. Additionally, those substances provisionally categorized as pollution category X, Y or Z and listed in MEPC 2 Circulars for substances subject to tripartite agreements (carried in bulk)
- Dangerous liquid substances listed in chapter 17 of the IBC Code (carried in bulk)
- Dangerous, hazardous and harmful substances, materials and articles covered by the IMDG Code, in effect in 1996 (carried in packaged form)
- Liquefied gases as listed in chapter 19 of the IGC Code
- Liquid substances with a Flash Point not exceeding 60°C (carried in bulk)
- Solid bulk materials possessing chemical hazards covered by the IMSBC Code. These substances are also subject to the provisions of the IMDG Code in effect in 1996 (carried in packaged form)

The convention also distinguishes substances based on whether they are transported in bulk or in packaged form. Bulk HNS include solids and liquids, such as oils and liquefied gases. Packaged HNS include dangerous, hazardous and harmful materials and articles in packaged form, which fall under the International Maritime Dangerous Goods Code.

A free online database of hazardous and noxious substances is available to verify whether a substance is considered hazardous or noxious. The database also provides information on classification criteria.

== Compensation ==
The HNS convention establishes a two-tier system for compensation in the event of accidents at sea involving hazardous and noxious substances. Tier one will be covered by the ship owner's compulsory insurance. The ship owner will be able to limit his financial liability to an amount between 10 million and 100 million SDR (Special Drawing Rights is the International Monetary Fund's currency), which is approximately between US$15 million to US$150 million. The amount depends on the gross tonnage of the ship involved in the incident. If damage is caused by packaged HNS, the maximum liability for the ship owner is 115 million SDR, about US$175 million.

In cases where the insurance is insufficient, a second tier of compensation will be paid from the HNS fund. The second tier of compensation will be up to a maximum of 250 million SDR, about US$380 million. This includes any amount paid by the ship owner and his insurer. Companies that import hazardous and noxious substances in member states of the convention will be required to contribute to this fund. Contributions will be based on the amount of substances companies receive each year.

Types of damages covered:

- Loss of life or personal injury
- Loss of or damage to property outside the ship
- loss or damage caused by contamination of the environment
- Costs of preventive measures
