= Nippon Kaiji Kyokai =

Japanese ship classification society

Nippon Kaiji Kyokai (ClassNK)
- Native name: 日本海事協会
- Company type: Non profitable organization
- Industry: Classification society
- Founded: 1899
- Headquarters: Chiyoda, Tokyo, Japan
- Website: Nippon Kaiji Kyokai

Nippon Kaiji Kyokai (一般財団法人日本海事協会, Ippan-zaidan-hōjin Nippon Kaiji Kyōkai), also known by it s brand name ClassNK, is a non-profit, non-governmental organization ship classification society. ClassNK is one of the seven founding members of the International Association of Classification Societies, otherwise known as IACS.

== Background ==
As of December 2007, ClassNK had classified 6,793 ships with a total of 152.22 million gross tons, representing about 20% of the world merchant fleet currently under class. Although based in Japan, its surveyors work at shipbuilding and repair yards and ports around the world, examining ships wherever they are needed. On November 15, 1999, it celebrated its 100th anniversary. On May 28, 2012, ClassNK officially announced that its register had surpassed the 200 million gross ton mark, making it the world's first class society in history with more than 200 million gross tons on its register.

== Activities ==
Service offered by ClassNK include ship classification surveys, statutory surveys, and certification on behalf of Flag States based on international conventions, codes, national statutes, and its own rules and regulations. The organization also provides assessment and certification services for the safety management systems of ship management companies and the quality systems of ship builders and related manufacturers, acting as an independent third party. In addition, it offers appraisal, consulting, and supervisory services for both marine and non-marine related projects.

=== Ship classification related services ===
- Approval of service providers, manufacturers and manufacturing methods
- Inspection of materials, equipment and similar products
- Survey and registration of ship installations, machinery and appliances of new ships
- Survey and registration of ships and offshore structures during construction
- Survey and inspection of ships, offshore structures and related installations in service
- Testing and inspection of material and other types of testing machines

=== Statutory services ===
- Activities concerned with the certification of freight containers
- Appraisal of grain loading
- Assignment of freeboard
- Assignment of load limits for cargo handling appliances
- Audit and certification of safety management systems based on the ISM Code
- Statutory survey and certification services based on SOLAS, ILLC, MARPOL and other international conventions and codes on behalf of flag state administrations

=== Assessment and registration services ===
- Assessment and registration of environmental management systems based on the ISO14001 standards
- Assessment and registration of quality systems based on the ISO9000 series of quality standards

=== Technical services ===
- Appraisal and certification of ships and offshore structures
- Commissioned testing, research and computer analysis services
- Inspection and certification of non-marine machinery and equipment
- Technical consulting regarding ships and offshore structures
- Tonnage measurement and certification services
