= Water channel =

Water channel may refer to:

- Strait, a naturally formed, narrow waterway
- Channel (geography), a landform consisting of the outline of the path of a narrow body of water
- Canal, a man-made channel for water
- Aqueduct, a structure constructed to convey water
- Aquaporin, a cellular membrane structure that selectively passes water
- An experimental tank
  - Ship model basin, used in naval architecture to study the behaviour of sea vessels
  - Water tunnel (hydrodynamic), used to study hydraulic flow
  - Wave tank, a laboratory setup for observing the behavior of surface waves (also called: wave flume)
  - Ripple tank, a shallow glass tank of water used in schools and colleges to demonstrate the basic properties of waves
