= Garfield Thomas Water Tunnel =

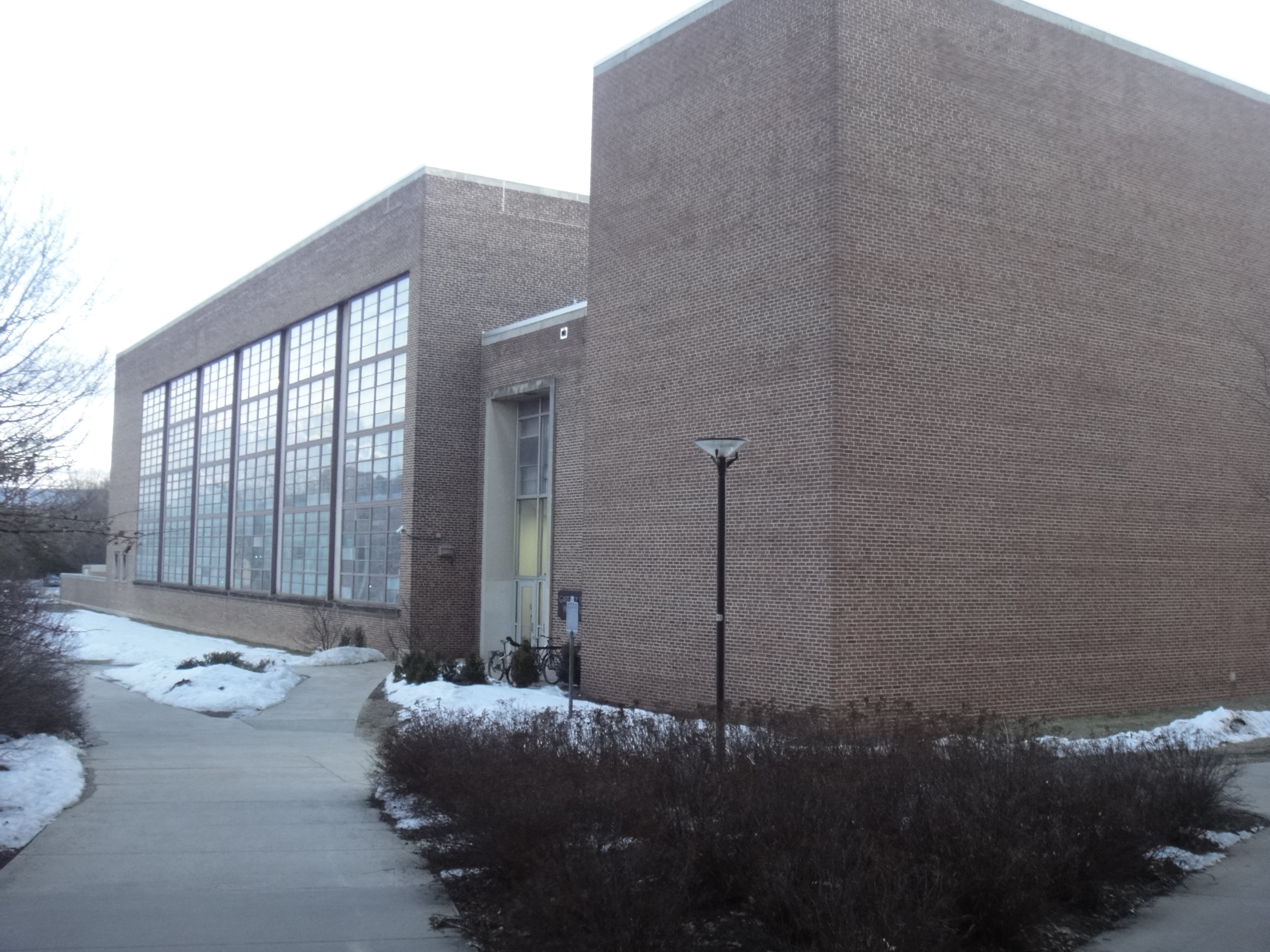
- Interactive map of the Garfield Thomas Water Tunnel area

General information
- Status: Completed
- Type: Educational, R&D
- Location: University Park, Pennsylvania, North Atherton Street, University Park, PA, 16801
- Coordinates: 40.793054°N 77.86822°W
- Construction started: 1948
- Completed: October 7, 1949
- Opened: March, 1950
- Renovated: 1992
- Client: ARL, U.S. Navy
- Owner: Penn State's Applied Research Laboratory

Website
- ARL Homepage

The Garfield Thomas Water Tunnel is one of the U.S. Navy's principal experimental hydrodynamic research facilities and is operated by the Penn State Applied Research Laboratory. The facility was completed and entered operation in 1949. The facility is named after Lieutenant W. Garfield Thomas Jr., a Penn State journalism graduate who was killed in World War II. For a long time, the Garfield Thomas Water Tunnel was the largest circulating water tunnel in the world. It has been declared a historic mechanical engineering landmark by the American Society of Mechanical Engineers.

Today, in addition to many of its Navy projects, the facility tunnel-based research has expanded into pumps for the Space Shuttle, advanced propulsors for ships, heating and cooling systems, artificial heart valves, vacuum cleaner fans, and other pump and propulsor related products.

== History ==
After the end of World War II, the US military started investing heavily in higher education nationwide. At the same time, Harvard terminated its Underwater Sound Laboratory (USL), which invented the first acoustical homing torpedo (FIDO); consequently Penn State hired Eric Walker, USL's assistant director to head its electrical engineering department, and the Navy transferred USL's torpedo division to Penn State - where it became the Ordnance Research Laboratory (ORL). The ORL eventually became the Applied Research Laboratory.

The Garfield Thomas Water Tunnel was built at Penn State in cooperation with ORL by the ARL for further torpedo research. Construction completed on October 7, 1949, and began operating six months later. Since then, the facility has expanded into viscosity, sound, wave, and wind research.

In 1992, the facility underwent a complete overhaul.

== Capabilities ==
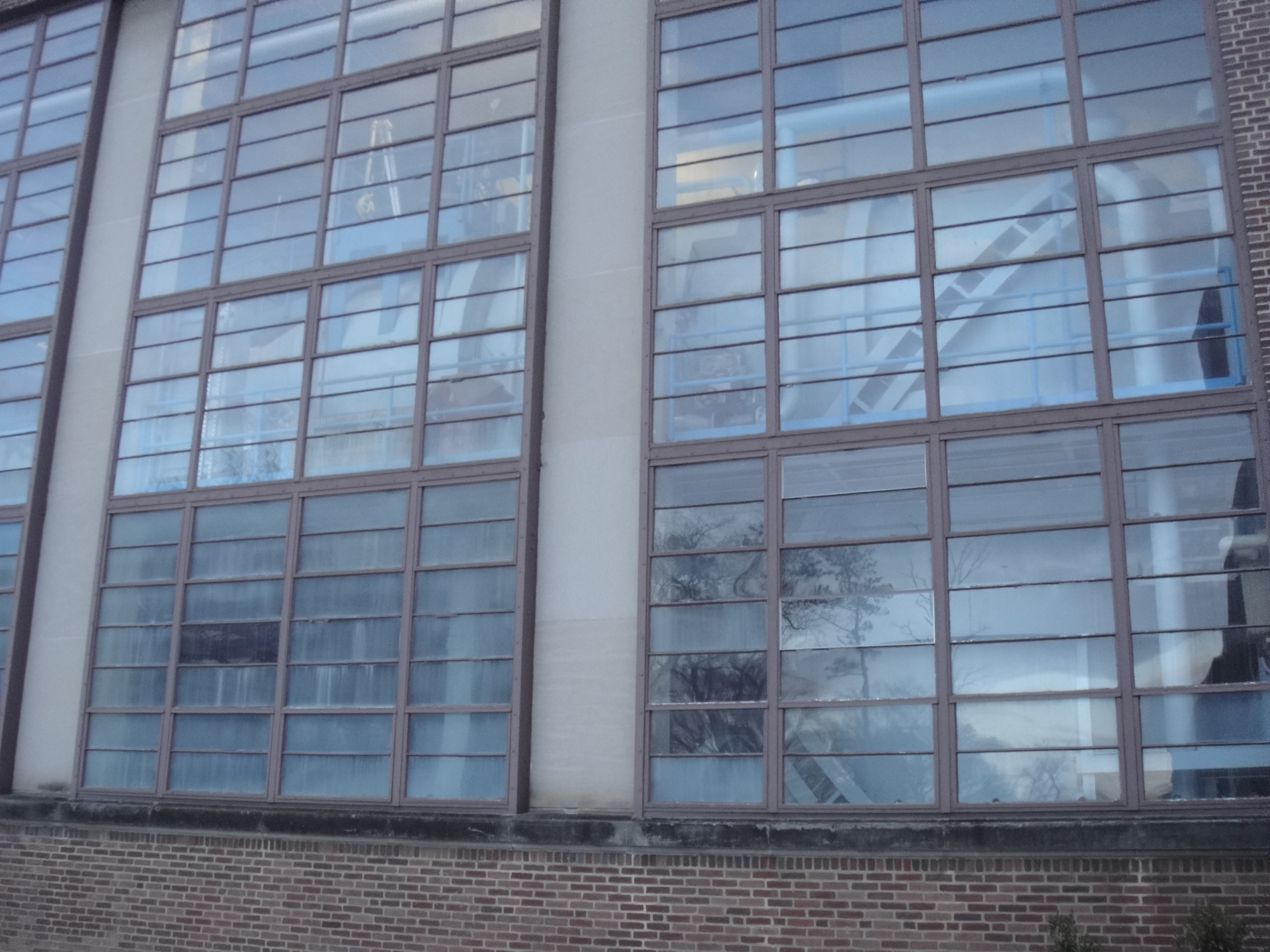
The main water tunnel could be seen from the outside through the glass windows for many decades before new opaque windows were installed.

The facility consists of a number of closed circuit, closed jet and open jet facilities.

=== Water Tunnels ===
The facility operates four water tunnels.

==== Garfield Thomas Water Tunnel ====
The Garfield Thomas Water Tunnel is the facility's largest water tunnel. The 100 feet long, 32 feet high, 100,000 gallons tunnel is a closed-circuit, closed-jet. The system is powered by 1,491 kW (2,000-hp) pump, with a 4-blade adjustable pitch impeller and can produce a maximum water velocity of 18.29 m/s (40.91 mph). The system is capable of producing pressures between 413.7 and 20.7 kPa.

The tunnel is equipped with an array of instruments including: Propeller dynamometers, Five-hole pressure probe, Pitot probes, lasers, pressure sensors, hydrophones, planar motion mechanism (PMM), force balances, accelerometers, and acoustics arrays.

==== Smaller Water Tunnels ====
The facility operates two additional smaller water tunnels with diameters of 12 inches and 6 inches. Both are closed-circuit, closed-jet. The 12-incher is a 150 horsepower (111.8 kW) system capable of producing maximum water velocity of 24.38 m/s (54.53 mph). The 6-incher is a 25 hp (18.64 kW) system that can deliver a max velocity of 21.34 m/s (47.74 mph).

Both tunnels are equipped with lasers, pressure sensors, pressure transducers, and hydrophones

==== Ultra-High Speed Cavitation Tunnel ====
The facility also has a 1.5 inch closed-circuit, closed-jet cavitation tunnel capable of producing a maximum velocity of 83.8 m/s (187 mph). The stainless steel, 75 hp (55.9 kW) tunnel supports pressures as high as 41.4 kPa and temperatures of 16 °C to 176 °C.

=== Other facilities ===
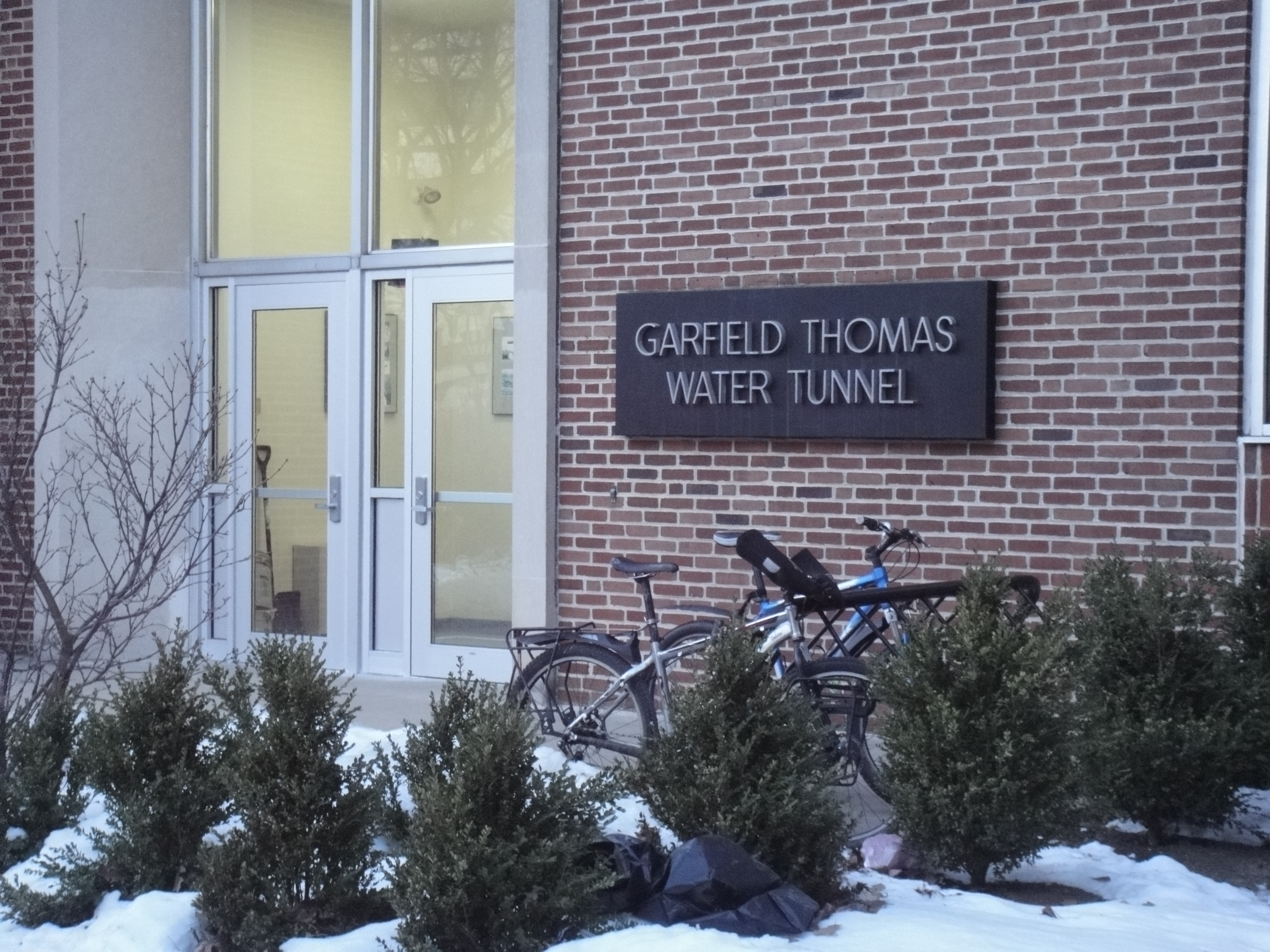
Water tunnel main entrance.

In addition to the water tunnels, the facility operates an array of wind tunnels, glycerin tunnels, and anechoic chamber for used in many physics problems. The Boundary Layer Research Facility (BLRF) operates a 12-inch turbulent pipe flow of glycerine. Additionally, the facility operates a 20 hp (14.91 kW), open-jet, 1,750 rpm Axial-Flow Fan with a 36.58 m/s (81.83 mph) maximum velocity used for basic engineering research in turbomachinery blading. Another 2.75 meter diameter, 100 hp (74.6 kW) closed-circuit used specifically for research in viscous sublayer and in modeling of turbulent flow of fluids next to a wall at large scale.

== See also ==
- Pennsylvania State University Applied Research Laboratory
- Water tunnel (hydrodynamic)
- Ship model basin
- Pennsylvania State University
- List of historic mechanical engineering landmarks
