= Emerson Cavitation Tunnel =

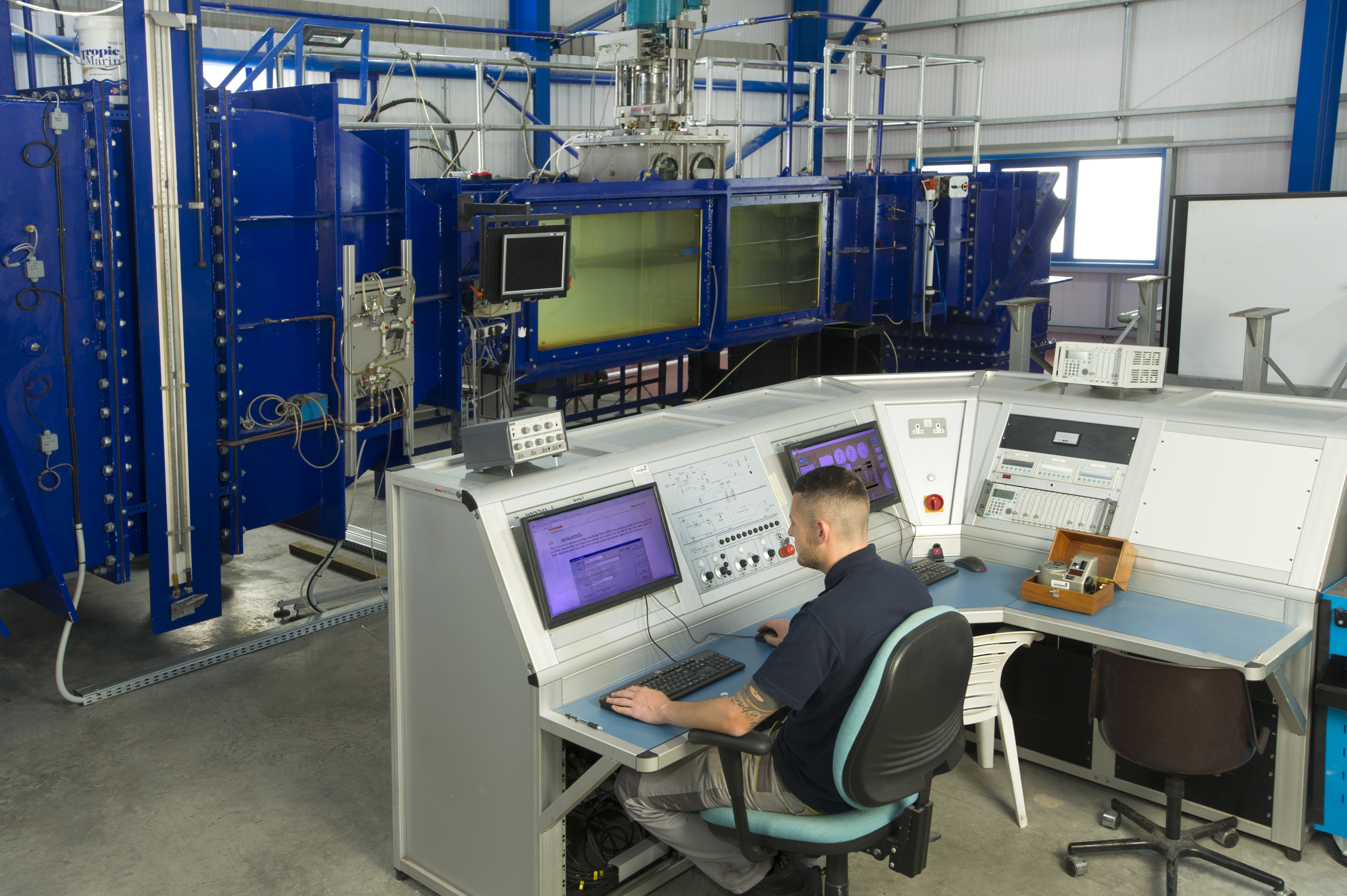
- Interactive map of the Emerson Cavitation Tunnel area

General information
- Type: Educational
- Location: Newcastle University Marine Station, Blyth, United Kingdom
- Coordinates: 55.124894°N 1.497748°W
- Completed: 1949, refurbished and relocated in 2017
- Owner: Newcastle University

The Emerson Cavitation Tunnel is a propeller testing facility that is part of the School of Engineering at Newcastle University.

== Capabilities ==
The Emerson Cavitation Tunnel consists of a water circuit which flows in the vertical plane, within which propellers and other propulsion devices can be tested. The system is powered by a 300 kW (400 hp) pump, with a four-bladed impeller and can produce a maximum water velocity of 15.5 knots (28.7 km/h; 17.8 mph). The test area has a cross sectional area of 0.99 m^{2} (10.7 sq ft) allowing model propellers of up to 30 cm (12 in) in diameter to be tested. The pressure range of the tunnel can vary from a minimum of 7.6 kN/m^{2} to a maximum of 106 kN/m^{2}. Cavitation numbers of 0.5 (minimum) to 23 (maximum) can be accommodated for. Measurements can be taken using a 3 Watt, water-cooled, Argon-ion laser, a hydrophone, and two dynamometers. A high-speed video camera is also attached with an imaging frequency of 1–10,000 frames per second.

Funding for the tunnel's equipment is raised by numerous organisations, including the Engineering and Physical Sciences Research Council (EPSRC) and the Scottish Universities of Glasgow and Strathclyde.

== History ==
The tunnel was first established at the university in 1949 after being disassembled and transported from Pelzerhaken, Germany after the Second World War. The tunnel arrived at the university in 1947 and over the following few years the tunnel was heavily modified. The tunnel - which was originally designed to be operated in the horizontal plane - was converted into a vertical loop tunnel and the length was reduced by half. The original observation window was modified and two more added. Because of damage, a new impeller was constructed and numerous pieces of measuring equipment were added. This equipment included pitot tubes, a tachometer, stroboscopic lighting equipment, contact meters and a vacuum pump. The tunnel was connected to an electrical supply in 1949 and entered service late in 1950, after technical problems called for recalibration of some of the instruments. The Cavitation Tunnel was housed in Newcastle University's old boiler house, where it was originally reconstructed. That location was on King's Road in the middle of the university's city centre campus between the Armstrong building, the Student Union, the Arches and the Bedson building.

In 2016, the tunnel was moved from the Newcastle University city centre campus and taken to Poland, where it was fully refurbished before being brought back to the North East and installed in a new purpose-built research centre, Marine campus at Blyth.

The first research grant of £8,000 was awarded in 1950 for the testing of a new series of propellers, and was awarded by the Department of Scientific and Industrial Research (DSIR).

In the 1970s and 1980s, the tunnel was extensively modified and upgraded in order to improve the range of propellers that could be tested. The tunnel was also renamed to its current name, the Emerson Cavitation Tunnel after Dr Arnold Emerson, who was the tunnel superintendent and the driving force behind the upgrades.

Modifications were made to the tunnel during the 1980s. New computer-based data collection, interpretation and analysis technology has been added to aid with computational fluid dynamics. Data is also collected with the help of laser doppler anemometry (LDA) and phase doppler anemometry (PDA).

== Location ==
The tunnel is now located at Newcastle University's Marine Campus at Blyth, Northumberland.

== See also ==
- Water tunnel (hydrodynamic)
- Ship model basin
