= William Garfield Thomas Jr. =

William Garfield Thomas Jr. (September 13, 1916 - October 12, 1942) was born in Watsontown, Pennsylvania.

== Naval career ==
He enlisted in the U.S. Naval Reserve at Philadelphia, Pennsylvania, June 14. He was appointed midshipman August 10, 1940, commissioned ensign November 14, 1940, and promoted to lieutenant (j.g.) June 15, 1942.

He was serving on the light cruiser USS Boise during the Battle of Cape Esperance. When his "turret was hit by enemy fire and danger of ... explosions grew increasingly imminent, Lt. (j.g.) Thomas with utter disregard of his own personal safety remained behind to ensure abandonment of the perilous area . . . Despite the fact that eight of his men succeeded in getting out and that he too might easily have escaped . . . Thomas when last seen was telephoning the handling room to order the crew out."

== Awarded the Navy Cross ==
He was awarded the Navy Cross for giving up his life in the defense of his country.

== Namesake ==
USS Garfield Thomas (DE-193) was named in his honor. The ship was laid down September 23, 1943 by the Federal Shipbuilding & Dry Dock Co., Newark, New Jersey; launched December 12, 1943; sponsored by Lt. Betty K. Thomas, Nurse Corps, United States Army, sister of Lt. (j.g.) W. G. Thomas; and, commissioned January 24, 1944.

The Garfield Thomas Water Tunnel operated by the Pennsylvania State University Applied Research Laboratory is named in his honor; completed on October 7, 1949.
