= D67 =

D67 may refer to:

- D. 67, Trio "Frisch atmet des Morgens lebendiger Hauch" for two tenors and bass (1813) by Franz Schubert
- Greek destroyer Panther (D67) Cannon-class destroyer escort built for the United States Navy during World War II
- HMAS Torrens (D67), River-class torpedo-boat destroyer of the Royal Australian Navy (RAN)
- HMS Carlisle (D67), C-class light cruiser of the Royal Navy, named after the English City of Carlisle
- HMS Tyrian (D67), S-class destroyer built for the Royal Navy during the Second World War
- HMS Wishart (D67), Modified W-class destroyer of the British Royal Navy that saw service in World War II
- INS Mormugao (D67), the second ship of the Visakhapatnam-class stealth guided-missile destroyers of the Indian Navy
