= Ice tank =

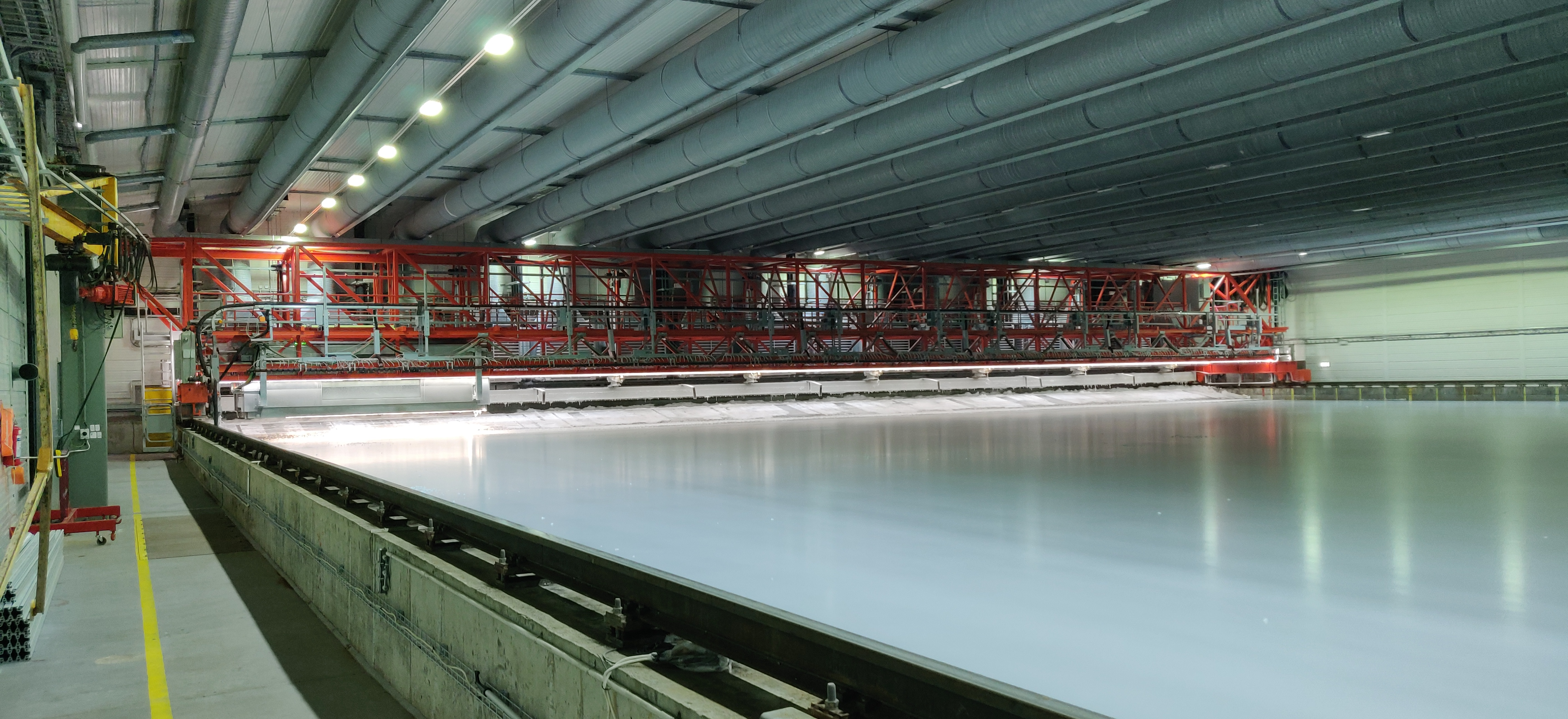
Aalto Ice and Wave Tank in Espoo, Finland

An ice tank is a ship model basin whose purpose is to provide a physical modeling environment for the interaction of ship, structures, or sea floor with both ice and water. Ice tanks may take the form of either a towing tank or maneuvering basin.

Many un-refrigerated ship model basins use ice simulants such as paraffin wax, plaster, and mixtures of foam or plastic beads. The cleanup and handling of such simulants often proves cumbersome. What differentiates an ice tank from other ship model basins is that an ice tank has purpose built provisions into its structure for handling such material conveniently. Use of a refrigerated basin containing mostly water allows freezing and melting to be a convenient method of model ice preparation and cleanup.

== Ice scaling ==
Ship model basins often simulate full-scale processes in miniature. Ships and structures are reduced linearly in size, and cubic in mass, displacement, and volume. The challenge in ice modeling is correctly reducing the ice properties of interest to provide an accurate simulation.

Many factors and properties are of interest when simulating ice. The actual environment that will be simulated is of prime concern. For example, ice pieces flowing then jamming a spring river would be modeled very differently from a ship model traversing a simulated arctic ice sheet. Different again would be a ship traversing an area of loose broken ice pieces or pack ice.

== Weakened ice method ==
One important factor in icebreaker model testing is the effect of changing ice strengths and thickness. For example: if a 1 to 30 scale is chosen, then the ship model is 1/30 the size. The ice used must also be 1/30 the thickness and 1/30 the strength.

If one was to use pure-water ice, the problem is that pure-water ice does not soften.

Many ice tanks simulate ice using a mixture consisting mostly of water and chemical additives called dopants, which are chemicals which reduce the melting temperature of pure water ice. Common dopants used are salt, ethanol, ethylene glycol, and urea.

By using a sufficiently cold temperature, both water and dopant are frozen in solution together forming an ice sheet. This impure ice sheet is inherently softer than pure-water ice but may be much harder than the scale strength desired. Once a desired thickness is achieved, the air temperature is raised to a tempering temperature. As the temperature of the ice rises the dopants come out of frozen solution and form liquid brine pockets. These brine pockets slowly drain out of the ice sheet thus weakening it. Provided the ice-sheet isn't allowed to refreeze, the strength of the ice continues to decrease approaching an asymptotic value. Choosing a correct ice scale then becomes a question of when to conduct the test. This softening is often referred to as tempering.

Different ice simulants model ice differently. For example, most icebreakers break ice by riding upward unto the ice and breaking downward by the weight of the vessel. In this case, correctly modeling ice's downward flexural strength is most important. In the case of bridges or offshore structure, compressive strength or upward flexural strength may be of more interest. The effects of ice on ship propulsion often require model ice density to be reduced by adding controlled amounts of gas or air during the freezing process.

== List of ice tanks ==
Facility	Location	Years	Length	Width	Depth	Technology	Notes	Ref
Aalto University	Espoo, Finland	1980s–present	40 m (131 ft)	40 m (131 ft)	2.8 m (9 ft)	Fine-grained with ethanol		
Korea Research Institute of Ships & Ocean Engineering (KRISO)	Daejeon, South Korea		42 m (138 ft)	32 m (105 ft)	2.5 m (8 ft)			
National Research Council of Canada (NRCC-OCRE)	St. John's, Newfoundland, Canada	1985 – present	90 m (295 ft)	12 m (39 ft)	3.0 m (10 ft)			
HSVA, Large Ice Model Basin	Hamburg, Germany		78 m (256 ft)	10 m (33 ft)	2.5 m (8 ft)			
Aker Arctic Technology Inc	Helsinki, Finland	2006–present	75 m (246 ft)	8 m (26 ft)	2.1 m (7 ft)	Fine-grained with salt		
Masa-Yards Arctic Research Centre (MARC)	Helsinki, Finland	1982–2006	77.3 m (254 ft)	6.5 m (21 ft)	2.3 m (8 ft)	Fine-grained with salt	Wärtsilä Arctic Research Centre (WARC) until 1989; Aker Arctic since 2005.	
Wärtsilä Ice Model Basin (WIMB)	Helsinki, Finland	1969–1982	50 m (164 ft)	4.8 m (16 ft)	1.15 m (4 ft)	Saline water	Built inside an old air raid shelter	
CRREL	Hanover, New Hampshire, United States		37 m (121 ft)	9 m (30 ft)	2.4 m (8 ft)			
NMRI	Mitaka, Tokyo, Japan		35 m (115 ft)	6 m (20 ft)	1.8 m (6 ft)			
Krylov State Research Centre	St. Petersburg, Russia		102 m (335 ft)	10 m (33 ft)	2 m (7 ft)			
HSVA, Environmental Test Basin	Hamburg, Germany	1971–	30 m (98 ft)	6 m (20 ft)	1.2 m (4 ft)			
National Research Council of Canada (NRCC-OCRE)	Ottawa, Ontario, Canada		21 m (69 ft)	7 m (23 ft)	1.1 m (4 ft)			
Arctic and Antarctic Research Institute (AARI)	St. Petersburg, Russia		35 m (115 ft)	5 m (16 ft)	1.8 m (6 ft)			
Arctic and Antarctic Research Institute (AARI)	Leningrad, Soviet Union	1955–??	13.4 m (44 ft)	1.85 m (6 ft)	1.1 m (4 ft)	Saline water	World's first ice tank.	
