= Ship motions =

Ships motions as defined by the six degrees of freedom of motion

Ship motions: sign convention for translatory and angular displacements.

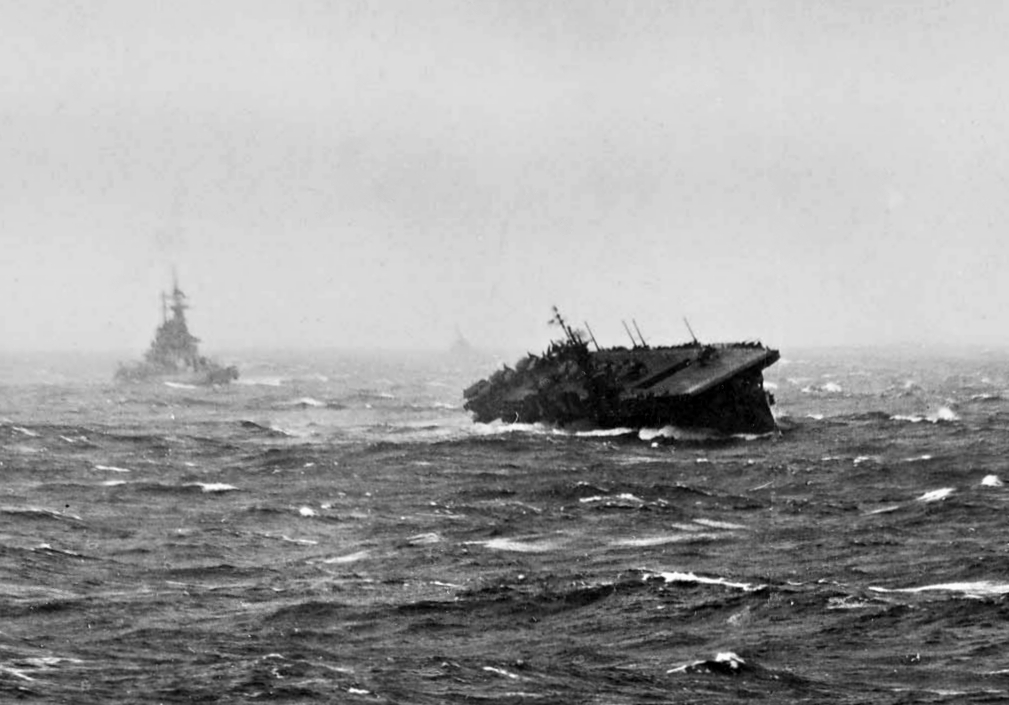
Aircraft carrier rolling during a typhoon.

Ship motions are the six degrees of freedom that a ship, boat, or other watercraft can experience. These can be affected by the ship’s own propulsion as well as by the water and air through which it moves, which move independently of the ship.

== Reference axes ==
The vertical/Z axis, or yaw axis, is an imaginary line running vertically through the ship and through its centre of mass. A yaw motion is a side-to side movement of the bow and stern of the ship.

The transverse/Y axis, lateral axis, or pitch axis is an imaginary line running horizontally across the ship and through the centre of mass. A pitch motion is an up-or-down movement of the bow and stern of the ship.

The longitudinal/X axis, or roll axis, is an imaginary line running horizontally through the length of the ship, through its centre of mass, and parallel to the waterline. A roll motion is a side-to-side or port-starboard tilting motion of the superstructure around this axis.

== Rotational ==
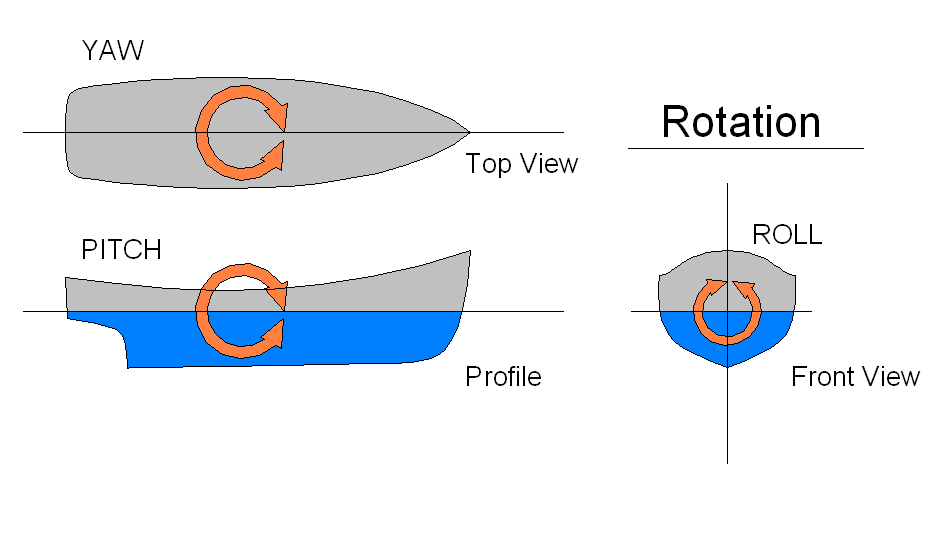
Axes of a ship and rotations around them

There are three special axes in any ship, called longitudinal, transverse and vertical axes. The angular movements around them—affecting the ship's moment of inertia, which sets the torque it requires to rotate in any direction—are the ship's rotational motions (or rotary motions), known as roll, pitch, and yaw respectively.

=== Roll ===
The tilting rotation of a vessel about its longitudinal/X (front-back or bow-stern) axis. An offset or deviation from normal on this axis is referred to as list or heel. Heel refers to an offset that is intentional or expected, as caused by wind pressure on sails, turning, or other crew actions. The rolling motion towards a steady state (or list) angle due to the ship's own weight distribution is referred in marine engineering as list. List normally refers to an unintentional or unexpected offset, as caused by flooding, battle damage, shifting cargo, etc.

=== Pitch ===
The up/down rotation of a vessel about its transverse/Y (side-to-side or port-starboard) axis. An offset or deviation from normal on this axis is referred to as trim or out of trim. A vessel that is pitching back and forth is usually termed to be hobby horsing.

=== Yaw ===
The turning rotation of a vessel about its vertical/Z axis. An offset or deviation from normal on this axis is referred to as deviation or set. This is referred to as the heading of the boat relative to a magnetic compass (or true heading if referenced to the true north pole); it also affects the bearing.

== Translational ==
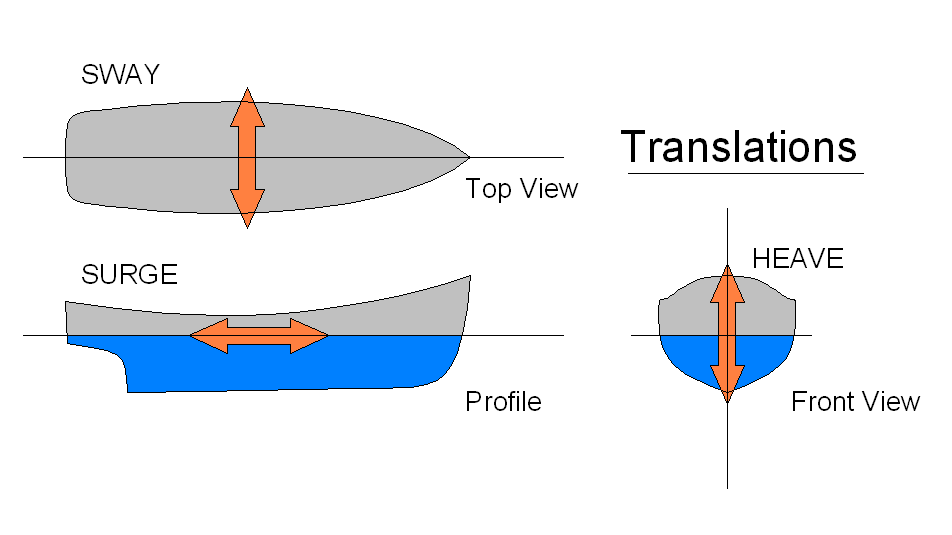
Translations

A ship can also move linearly along any of its axes—longitudinal, transverse, and vertical. These translational motions (or translatory motions) are known as surge, sway, and heave respectively.

=== Surge ===
The linear longitudinal (front/back or bow/stern) motion imparted by maritime conditions, usually head or following seas, or by accelerations imparted by the propulsion system.

=== Sway ===
The linear transverse (side-to-side or port-starboard) motion. This motion is generated directly either by the water and wind motion, particularly lateral wave motion, exerting forces against the hull or by the ship's own propulsion; or indirectly by the inertia of the ship while turning. This movement can be compared to the vessel's lateral drift from its course.

=== Heave ===
The linear vertical (up/down) motion; excessive downward heave can swamp a ship.

== Stabilization ==
There are methods for both passive and active motion stabilization used in some designs. They include static hull features such as skegs and bilge keels, or active mechanical devices like counterweights, antiroll tanks and stabilizers.

== See also ==
- Jibe – Basic sailing maneuver, where ship turns its stern through the wind
- Tacking (sailing) – Sailing maneuver
- Translation (physics) – Planar movement within a Euclidean space without rotation
- Rotation – Movement of an object which leaves at least one point unchanged
- Naval architecture – Engineering discipline of marine vessels
- Seakeeping – Response of a vessel to sea conditions
- Stern suction – Tendency of the stern of a ship making way to swing toward the near bank
- Ship stability – Ship response to disturbance from an upright condition
- Ship motion test – Scale model a hydrodynamic test to predict full size behaviour
- Six degrees of freedom – Types of movement possible for a rigid body in three-dimensional space
- Flight dynamics – Study of the performance, stability, and control of flying vehicles
