= Ripple tank =

Glass tank of water demonstrating the basic properties of waves

A simple ripple tank

In physics, a ripple tank is a shallow glass tank of water used to demonstrate the basic properties of waves. It is a specialized form of a wave tank. The ripple tank is usually illuminated from above, so that the light shines through the water. Some small ripple tanks fit onto the top of an overhead projector, i.e. they are illuminated from below. The ripples on the water show up as shadows on the screen underneath the tank. All the basic properties of waves, including reflection, refraction, interference and diffraction, can be demonstrated.

Ripples may be generated by a piece of wood that is suspended above the tank on elastic bands so that it is just touching the surface. Screwed to wood is a motor that has an off center weight attached to the axle. As the axle rotates the motor wobbles, shaking the wood and generating ripples.

== Demonstrating wave properties ==
A number of wave properties can be demonstrated with a ripple tank. These include plane waves, reflection, refraction, interference and diffraction.

== Plane waves ==
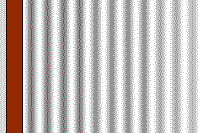
Image of plane waves

When the rippler is lowered so that it just touches the surface of the water, plane waves will be produced.

Close-up of the rippler – the brown rectangle is an oscillating paddle

== Circular waves ==
Ripple tank with a spherical source producing circular waves

When the rippler is attached with a point spherical ball and lowered so that it just touches the surface of the water, circular waves will be produced.

== Reflection ==
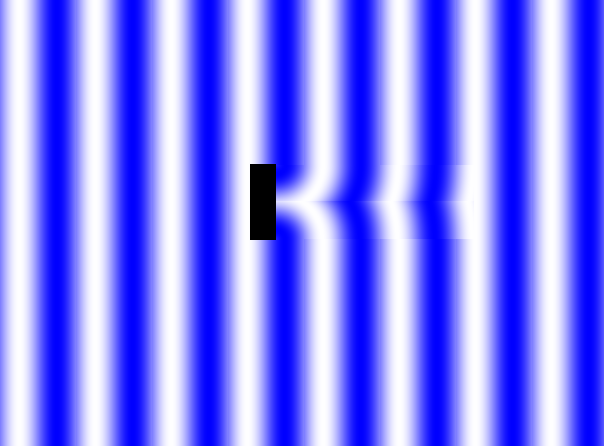
Waves that are long relative to the size of an object will wrap around the object.

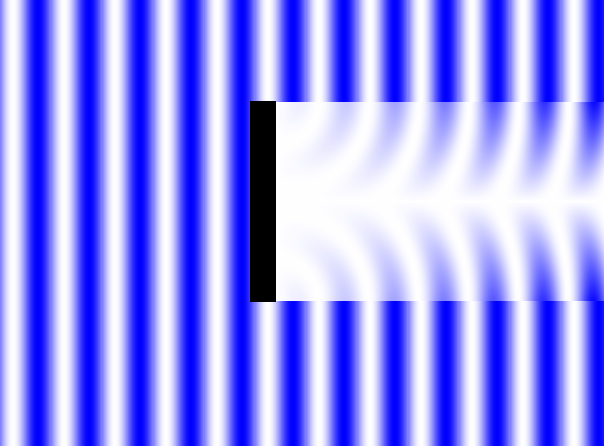
Waves that are short in respect to the size of an object will cast a shadow behind the object.

Numerical approximation of diffraction pattern from a slit of width equal to five times the wavelength of an incident plane wave in 3D visualization

Numerical approximation of diffraction pattern from a slit of width equal to wavelength of an incident plane wave in 3D visualization

=== Demonstrating reflection and focusing of mirrors ===
By placing a metal bar in the tank and tapping the wooden bar a pulse of three or four ripples can be sent towards the metal bar. The ripples reflect from the bar. If the bar is placed at an angle to the wavefront the reflected waves can be seen to obey the law of reflection. The angle of incidence and angle of reflection will be the same.

If a concave parabolic obstacle is used, a plane wave pulse will converge on a point after reflection. This point is the focal point of the mirror. Circular waves can be produced by dropping a single drop of water into the ripple tank. If this is done at the focal point of the "mirror" plane waves will be reflected back.

== Refraction ==
If a sheet of glass is placed in the tank, the depth of water in the tank will be shallower over the glass than elsewhere. The speed of a wave in water depends on the depth, so the ripples slow down as they pass over the glass. This causes the wavelength to decrease. If the junction between the deep and shallow water is at an angle to the wavefront, the waves will refract.

In practice, showing refraction with a ripple tank is quite tricky to do.

- The sheet of glass needs to be quite thick, with the water over it as shallow as possible. This maximizes the depth difference and so causes a greater velocity difference and therefore greater angle.
- If the water is too shallow, viscous drag effects cause the ripples to disappear very quickly.
- The glass should have smooth edges to minimize reflections at the edge.

== Diffraction ==
If a small obstacle is placed in the path of the ripples, and a slow frequency is used, there is no shadow area as the ripples refract around it, as shown below on the right. A faster frequency may result in a shadow, as shown below on the right. If a large obstacle is placed in the tank, a shadow area will probably be observed.

If an obstacle with a small gap is placed in the tank the ripples emerge in an almost semicircular pattern. If the gap is large however, the diffraction is much more limited. Small, in this context, means that the size of the obstacle is comparable to the wavelength of the ripples.

== Diffraction from a grid ==
A phenomenon identical to the x-ray diffraction of x-rays from an atomic crystal lattice can also be seen, thus demonstrating the principles of crystallography. If one lowers a grid of obstacles into the water, with the spacing between the obstacles roughly corresponding to the wavelength of the water waves, one will see diffraction from the grid. At certain angles between the grid and the oncoming waves, the waves will appear to reflect off the grid; at other angles, the waves will pass through. Similarly, if the frequency (wavelength) of the waves is altered, the waves will also alternately pass through or be reflected, depending on the precise relationship between spacing, orientation and wavelength.

== Interference ==
Interference can be produced by the use of two dippers that are attached to the main ripple bar. In the diagrams below on the left the light areas represent crests of waves, the black areas represent troughs. Notice the grey areas: they are areas of destructive interference where the waves from the two sources cancel one another out. To the right is a photograph of two-point interference generated in a circular ripple tank.

== See also ==
- Capillary wave
- PSSC Physics – pioneering secondary-school physics textbook which made extensive use of ripple tanks to illustrate waves
- Shallow water equations
- Wave tank
