= Pennsylvania State University Applied Research Laboratory =

Research division of Penn State University

- Established: 1945
- Research type: applied research
- Budget: Not Published
- Field of research: acoustics, guidance control, thermal energy, hydrodynamics, hydroacoustics, propulsion, navigation, communications
- Director: Allan G. Sonsteby
- Location: University Park, Pennsylvania, 16802, U.S.
- Campus: University Park
- Affiliations: United States Department of Defense
- Operating agency: Pennsylvania State University
- Website: www.arl.psu.edu

The Pennsylvania State University Applied Research Laboratory (short: Penn State ARL or simply ARL), is a specialized research unit dedicated to interdisciplinary scientific research at the Penn State University Park campus. The ARL is a DoD designated U.S. Navy University Affiliated Research Center. It is the university's largest research unit with over 1,000 faculty and staff. The laboratory ranks second in United States Department of Defense and 10th in NASA funding to universities.

ARL maintains a long-term relationship with the Naval Sea Systems Command and the Office of Naval Research.

== History ==
The ARL was established in 1945 by the U.S. Navy when the Harvard Underwater Sound Laboratory (USL) was terminated and its torpedo division was moved to Penn State. Eric Walker, the USL's assistant director, moved to Penn State to become its first director from 1945 until 1951, when he became Dean of the College of Engineering and Architecture. He would later become the Vice President for Research and then the President of the university, both in 1951.

Today, ARL operates over a dozen facilities ranging from acoustic research to fluid and nuclear.

== Laboratory structure ==
The ARL is made of six distinct research divisions:

- Advanced Technology
  - Includes: Autonomous Control and Intelligent Systems, Systems and Unmanned Vehicle, Energy Science and Power Systems, Sonar Research and Development
- Fluid and Structural Mechanics
  - Includes: Fluid Dynamics, Noise Control and Hydroacoustics, Computational and Mechanics, Research Facilities
- Material and Manufacturing
  - Includes: Material Processing, Manufacturing System, Laser Processing, Composite Material, Systems and Operations Automation
- Communications, Information, and Navigation
  - Includes: Communication Systems, Electromagnetics & Geospatial Systems, Information & Imaging, Visualization SEA Lab, Navigation Research & Development
- Undersea Weapons
  - Includes: Torpedoes Systems, Weapon Systems Engineering, Technology Development and Transition, Systems Analysis and Simulation
- Research and Academic Programs
  - Includes: Acoustics, Information Sciences and Technology

== Facilities ==
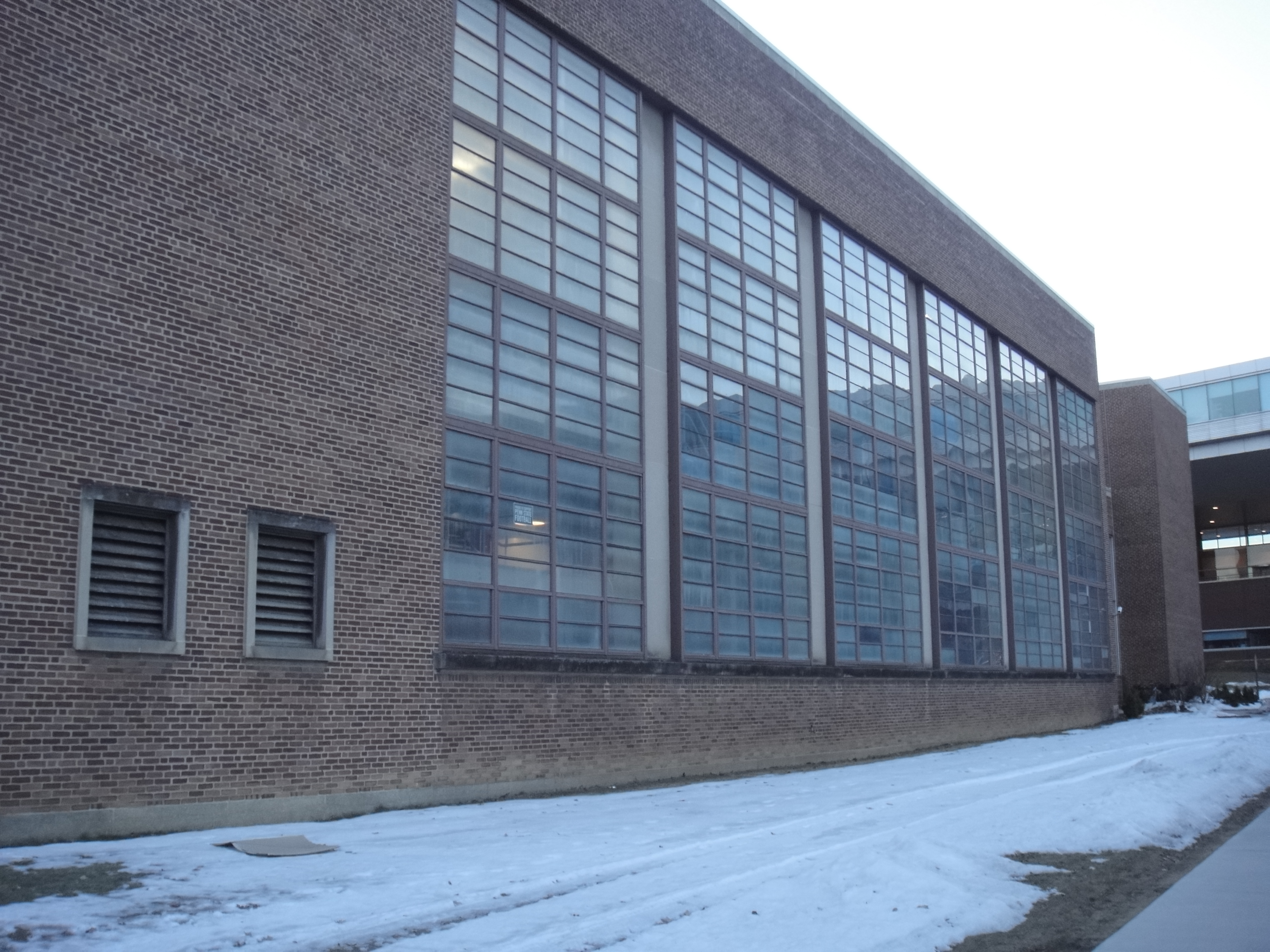
The Garfield Thomas Water Tunnel located at the Penn State main campus.

The Applied Research Laboratory operates a number of locations and off-site facilities.

- Penn State main campus buildings
  - Applied Research Laboratory Building
  - Applied Science Building
  - Garfield Thomas Water Tunnel
  - Research Building West
- Penn State satellite campus
  - Distributed Engineering Center, Penn State Fayette Campus
- Off-campus buildings
  - ARL West IV, Science Park Road, Ferguson Township, PA
  - ARL Science Park Building, Science Park Road, Ferguson Township, PA
  - ARL West I, Cato Park, Ferguson Township, PA
  - Exegyn ARL West II, Cato Park, Ferguson Township, PA
  - ARL West III (aka Atotech), Science Park Road, Ferguson Township, PA
  - 230 Building, Innovation Park, College Township, PA
  - Navigation Research & Development Building Center, Warminster, PA
  - Electro-Optics S&T Center, Kittanning, PA
  - Naval Undersea Warfare Center Division, Keyport, Keyport, WA
  - Reston Office, Reston Virginia
  - Key West Facility, Key West, Florida
  - EOC, Electro-Optics Center, Northpointe, Kittanning, Pennsylvania
  - Keyport, Washington
  - Mitchell Field, New York

== Acoustic research ==
ARL operates the Structural Acoustics Laboratory which houses an array of tanks including an Acoustic Reverberant Tank and an Acoustic Test Tank for acoustic research projects. The facilities include complete instrumentation for measuring and calibrating transducers and transducer arrays. The Acoustic Test Tank is equipped with the instrumentation required for determining the acoustic characteristics of sonar devices designed for frequency response calibrations, radiation pattern plots, and impedance and admittance characterizations.

Additionally, ARL operates a Large Anechoic Chamber with the "mission is to increase the knowledge and understanding of applied electromagnetics in key areas of defense and commercial systems utilizing communications, navigation, and sensor-based systems such as direction finding, for example." The facility is stationed in Warminster, Pennsylvania at the former Naval Air Warfare Center.

== Fluid dynamics research ==
The Garfield Thomas Water Tunnel was constructed shortly after the establishment of the ARL at Penn State in cooperation with the U.S. Navy for further torpedo research. The facility operates one of the largest circulating water tunnels in the world. It also operates an array of wind tunnels, glycerin tunnels, and anechoic chamber for used in many physics problems and experiments.

== Nuclear research ==
ARL operates the Advanced Nuclear Fuel Test Facility (ANFTF) which is a Westinghouse-funded facility to test advanced power reactors and fuel component designs. The facility entered operation in 1996 with a fully functional 600 MWe nuclear power plant, the Westinghouse AP600. The facility's objective is to characterize the effect of different fuel grid spacers on the onset of the departure from nucleate boiling (DNB) phenomenon and to quantify the critical heat flux (CHF) as the DNB event occurs.

== Space research ==
On September 4, 2013 an agreement has been reached between the Applied Research Laboratory and NASA's Lyndon B. Johnson Space Center. The laboratory created the Space Systems Initiative which would allow the space center to provide bipropellant rockets and liquid methane/liquid oxygen control engines with the university to enabling students to gain a better understanding of rocket performance. Data and results would be shared with NASA.

=== Lunar Lion ===
The Penn State Lunar Lion is a team within the Applied Research Laboratory as part of the Space Systems Initiative which has joined the Google Lunar X Prize. The team is expected to build a robotic spacecraft that is four feet in diameter and weighs 500 pounds. The team hopes to land the craft on the moon in December 2015. The project includes over 500 students and 50 faculty members.

== See also ==
- Pennsylvania State University
- Garfield Thomas Water Tunnel
