= Wave tank =

Laboratory setup for observing the behavior of surface waves

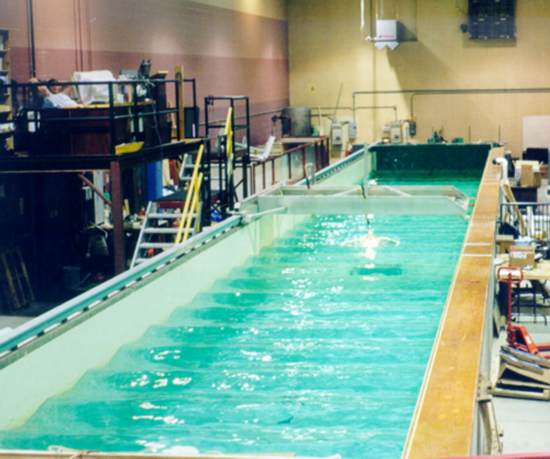
Model testing with periodic Stokes waves in the Wave–Tow Tank of the Jere A. Chase Ocean Engineering Laboratory, University of New Hampshire.

A wave tank is a laboratory setup for observing the behavior of surface waves. The typical wave tank is a box filled with liquid, usually water, leaving open or air-filled space on top. At one end of the tank, an actuator generates waves; the other end usually has a wave-absorbing surface. A similar device is the ripple tank, which is flat and shallow and used for observing patterns of surface waves from above.

== Wave basin ==
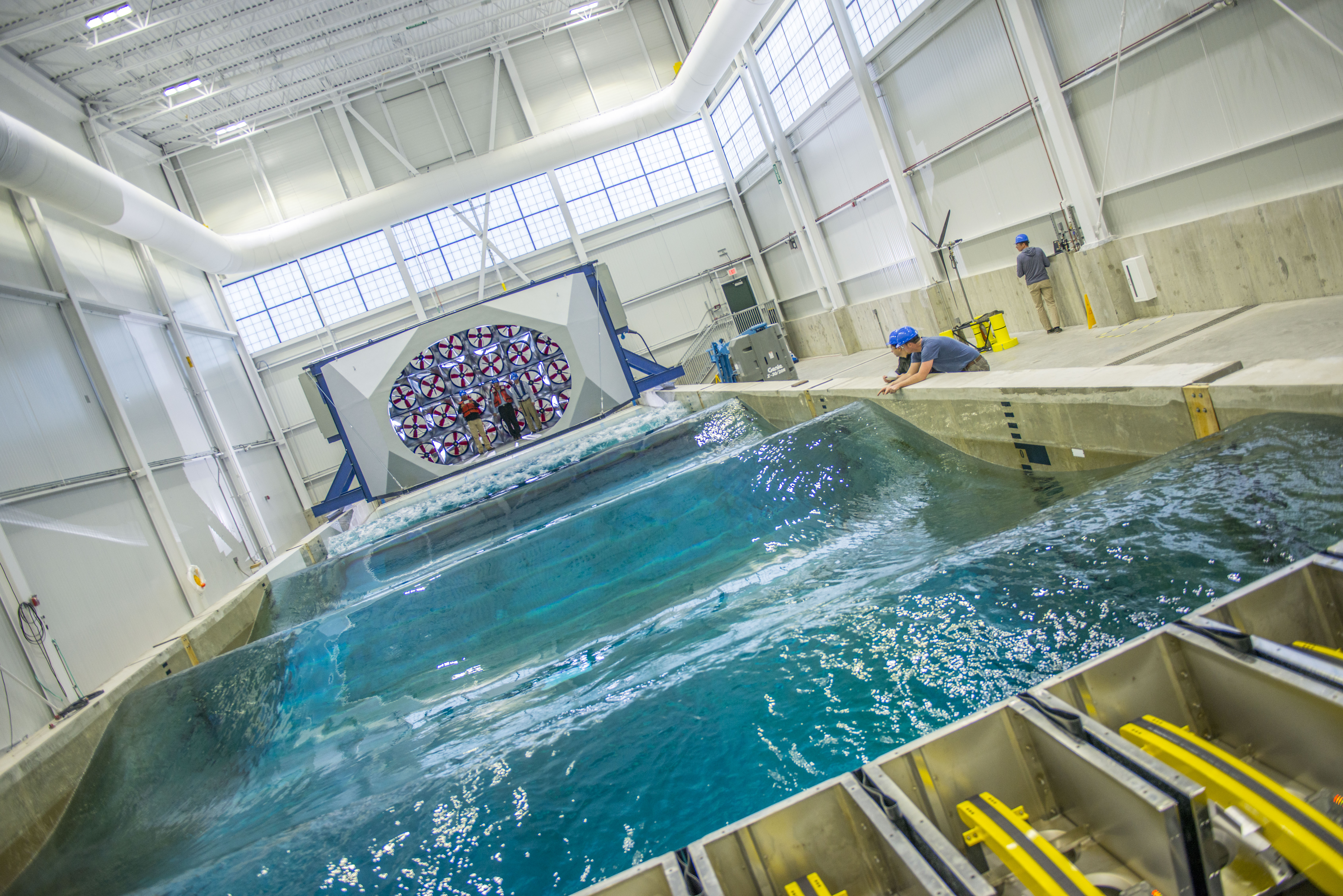
A wave basin at the University of Maine.

A wave basin is a wave tank which has a width and length of comparable magnitude, often used for testing ships, offshore structures and three-dimensional models of harbors (and their breakwaters).

== Wave flume ==
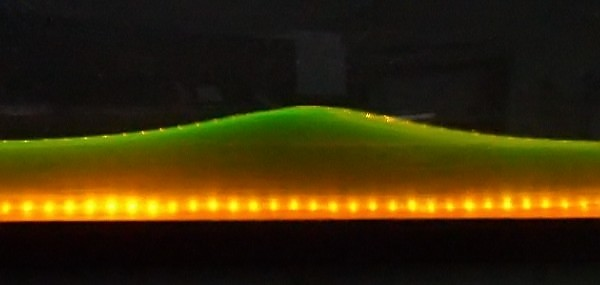
A solitary wave in a laboratory wave flume

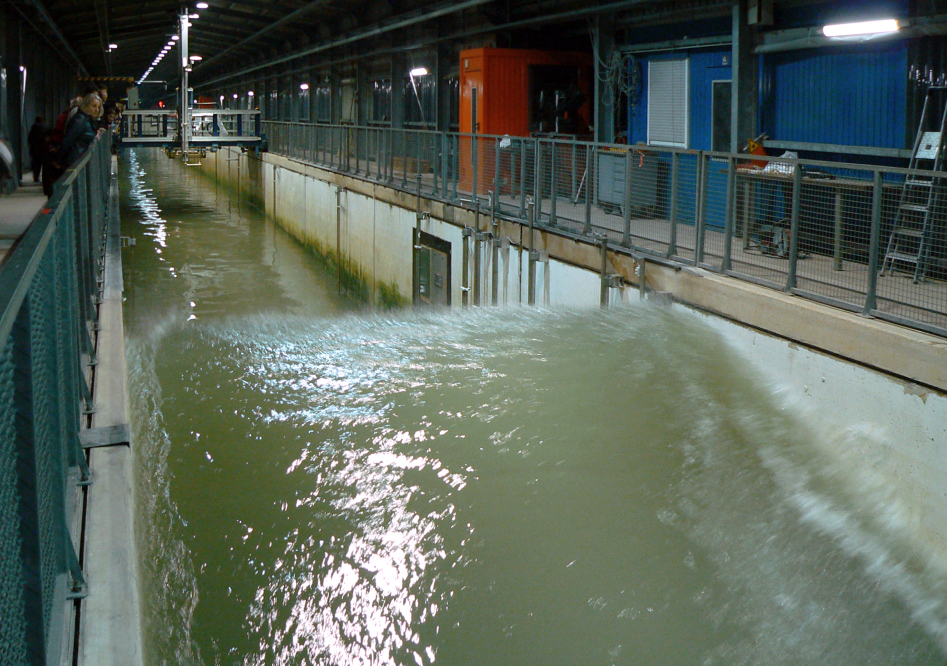
A large wave flume of Forschungszentrum Küste in Marienwerder/Hannover, Germany, with a length of 307 m and a depth of 7 m.

A wave flume (or wave channel) is a special sort of wave tank: the width of the flume is much less than its length. The generated waves are therefore – more or less – two-dimensional in a vertical plane (2DV), meaning that the orbital flow velocity component in the direction perpendicular to the flume side wall is much smaller than the other two components of the three-dimensional velocity vector. This makes a wave flume a well-suited facility to study near-2DV structures, like cross-sections of a breakwater. Also (3D) constructions providing little blockage to the flow may be tested, e.g. measuring wave forces on vertical cylinders with a diameter much less than the flume width.

Wave flumes may be used to study the effects of water waves on coastal structures, offshore structures, sediment transport and other transport phenomena.

The waves are most often generated with a mechanical wavemaker, although there are also wind–wave flumes with (additional) wave generation by an air flow over the water – with the flume closed above by a roof above the free surface. The wavemaker frequently consists of a translating or rotating rigid wave board. Modern wavemakers are computer controlled, and can generate besides periodic waves also random waves, solitary waves, wave groups or even tsunami-like wave motion. The wavemaker is at one end of the wave flume, and at the other end is the construction being tested, or a wave absorber (a beach or special wave absorbing constructions).

Head-on elastic soliton collision in shallow (h=13cm) water

Often, the side walls contain glass windows, or are completely made of glass, allowing for a clear visual observation of the experiment, and the easy deployment of optical instruments (e.g. by Laser Doppler velocimetry or particle image velocimetry).

== Circular wave basin ==
In 2014, the first circular, combined current and wave test basin, the FloWave Ocean Energy Research Facility was commissioned at The University of Edinburgh. This allows for "true" 360° waves to be generated to simulate rough storm conditions as well as scientific controlled waves in the same facility.

== See also ==
- Water tunnel (hydrodynamic)
- Airy wave theory
- Ocean waves
- Ripple tank
- Shallow water equations
