= USS Garfield Thomas =

Cannon-class destroyer escort

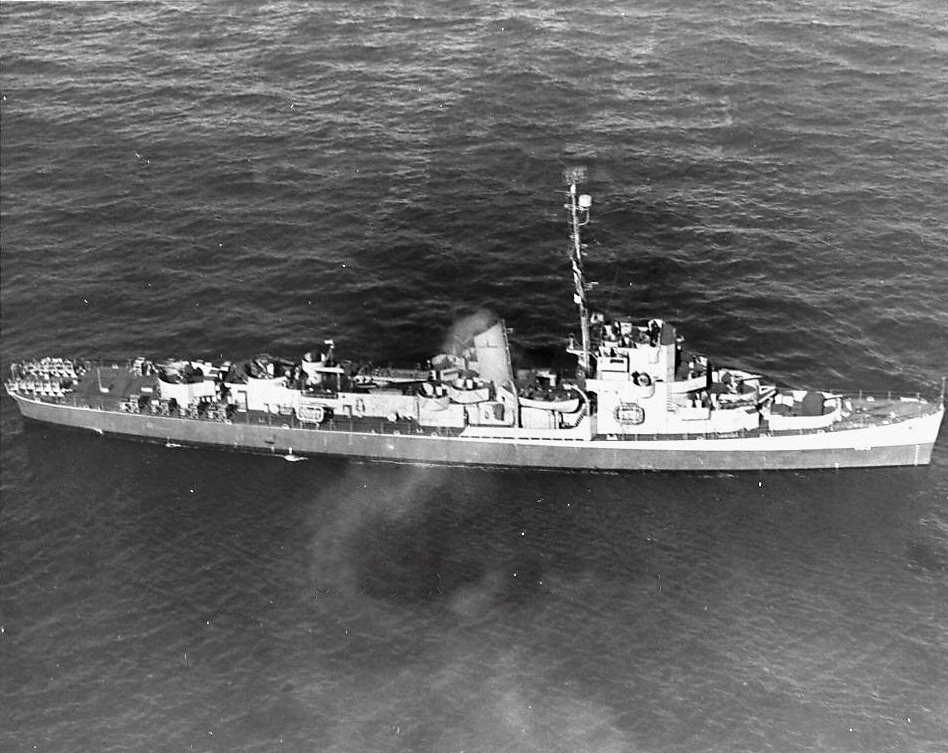

History

United States
- Name: USS Garfield Thomas (DE-193)
- Namesake: William Garfield Thomas, Jr.
- Builder: Federal Shipbuilding and Drydock Company, Newark, New Jersey
- Laid down: 23 September 1943
- Launched: 12 December 1943
- Commissioned: 24 January 1944
- Decommissioned: 27 March 1947
- Stricken: 26 March 1951
- Fate: Transferred to Greece, 15 January 1951

History

Greece
- Name: Panthir (D67)
- Acquired: 15 January 1951
- Stricken: 1992
- Fate: Laid up at Souda Bay, Crete in 1992

General characteristics
- Class & type: Cannon-class destroyer escort
- Displacement: 1,240 long tons (1,260 t) standard; 1,620 long tons (1,646 t) full
- Length: 306 ft (93 m) o/a; 300 ft (91 m) w/l
- Beam: 36 ft 10 in (11.23 m)
- Draft: 11 ft 8 in (3.56 m)
- Propulsion: 4 × GM Mod. 16-278A diesel engines with electric drive, 6,000 shp (4,474 kW), 2 screws
- Speed: 21 knots (39 km/h; 24 mph)
- Range: 10,800 nmi (20,000 km) at 12 kn (22 km/h; 14 mph)
- Complement: 15 officers and 201 enlisted
- Armament: 3 × single Mk.22 3"/50 caliber guns; 1 × twin 40 mm Mk.1 AA gun; 8 × 20 mm Mk.4 AA guns; 3 × 21 inch (533 mm) torpedo tubes; 1 × Hedgehog Mk.10 anti-submarine mortar (144 rounds); 8 × Mk.6 depth charge projectors; 2 × Mk.9 depth charge tracks

USS Garfield Thomas (DE-193) was a Cannon-class destroyer escort built for the United States Navy during World War II. She served in the Atlantic Ocean and Pacific Ocean and provided escort service against submarine and air attack for Navy vessels and convoys.

She was named in honor of William Garfield Thomas, Jr., who was awarded the Navy Cross posthumously for his actions during the Battle of Cape Esperance, 11–12 October 1942. The ship was laid down on 23 September 1943 by the Federal Shipbuilding and Dry Dock Co., Newark, New Jersey; launched on 12 December 1943; sponsored by Lt. Betty K. Thomas, Army Nurse Corps, sister of Lt. (j.g.) W. G. Thomas; and commissioned on 24 January 1944.

== World War II North Atlantic operations ==
After shakedown out of Bermuda, Garfield Thomas returned to New York on 11 March 1944. She stood out of New York on 19 March to join Task Group 27.4 as part of the screen for a convoy bound for Bizerte, North Africa, where she arrived on 31 March and returned New York on 13 April. She made two subsequent runs to Bizerte arriving New York from her third voyage on 7 September.

After training out of Casco Bay, Maine, Garfield Thomas departed New York on 14 October in the screen for a convoy bound for the United Kingdom, arriving in Plymouth on 25 October. After returning to New York on 9 November the destroyer escort made four subsequent convoy-escort voyages to the United Kingdom, the last bringing her back to New York from Cardiff on 19 May 1945.

== Transfer to Pacific Theatre operations ==
After repairs she departed New York on 9 June 1945, for refresher training in the Culebra-Guantánamo Bay areas, and then proceeded to Pearl Harbor, arriving on 20 July 1945. Training out of Pearl Harbor kept her busy until 8 August when she got under way with a convoy bound for the Marshalls. She arrived Eniwetok on 16 August 1945, and operated between the Marshalls and the Carolines, screening convoys and taking her turn as patrol ship until she departed Eniwetok on 8 December for Pearl Harbor, arriving eight days later.

After a month's duty as weather station ship Garfield Thomas departed Pearl Harbor on 9 February 1946, transited the Panama Canal and arrived New York on 1 March 1946.

== Greek service ==
After a brief overhaul, Garfield Thomas departed New York on 24 March for Green Cove Springs, Florida. She remained moored there until decommissioned on 27 March 1947. She entered the Atlantic Reserve Fleet there where she remained until transferred to Greece under the Military Assistance Program on 15 January 1951. The ship served in the Hellenic Navy under the name Panthir, with the pennant number 67 and was struck in 1992. In 1998 it was reported that she was laid up in Souda Bay, Crete.
