= Ship motion test =

Scale model a hydrodynamic test to predict full size behaviour

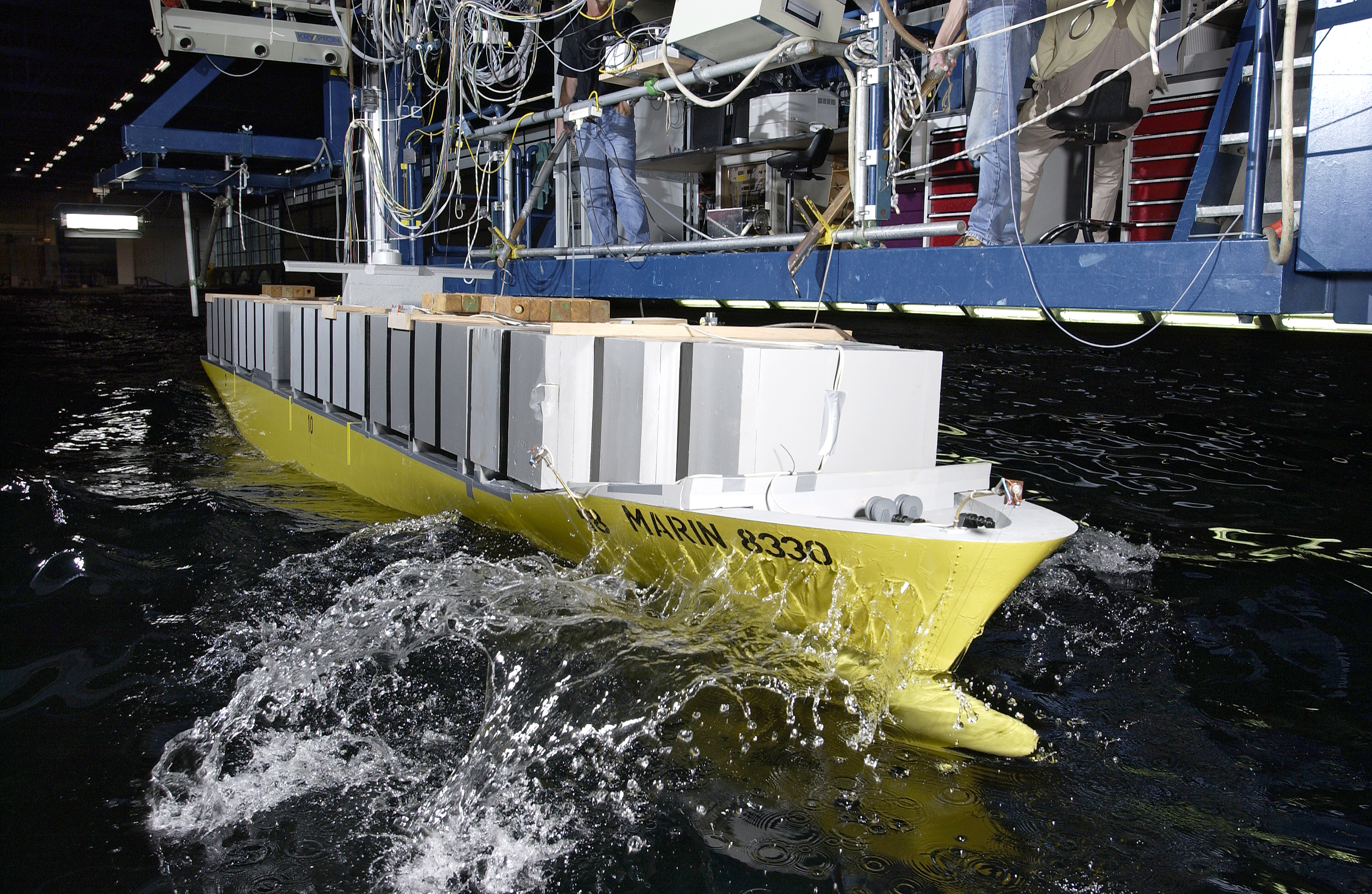
Model of Emma Mærsk undergoing testing in a ship model basin

In marine engineering, a ship motion test is hydrodynamic test performed with ship models for the purpose of designing a new (full sized) ship, or refining the design of a ship to improve its performance at sea. Tests are carried out in a ship model basin or "towing tank". There are various types of test: the model may be towed along a straight line or circular path, and may be subjected to oscillations. Forces acting on the vessel are measured using a dynamometer. The tests may be evaluating the overall design, or focusing on the characteristics of a propeller.

== Straight line test ==
The velocity-dependent derivatives Yv and Nv of the ship at any draft and trim can be determined from the model test carried in the towing tank. The model is towed with a constant velocity corresponding to a given ship Froude number at various angles of attack, β. A dynamometer at the origin O, measures the force Y and the moment N experienced by the model at each value of β. The dimensional ship values of the derivatives can then be obtained by multiplying the non-dimensional derivatives by the same respective combinations of ship length, ship speed and sea water density.

It can also be used to determine the cross-coupling effects of v on Yδ and Nδ and of δR on Yv and Nv.

== Rotating-arm technique ==
The Rotating Arm facility measures the rotary derivatives Yr and Nr on the model, in a special type of towing tank and apparatus called a rotating-arm facility. In this facility, an angular velocity is imposed on the model by fixing it to the end of a radial arm and rotating the arm about a vertical axis fixed in the tank. The model is oriented with its x-axis and z-axis normal to the radial arm and it is attached to the arm preferably at the model’s midlength. As a result of the particular orientation, as the model revolves about the tank axis, rotates at the rate r while its transverse velocity component v is at all times zero (yaw angle of attack β=0), and its axial velocity component u1 is identical to its linear speed. The model is rotated at a constant linear speed at various radii R, and the dynamometer measures the force Y and the moment N acting on the model. The derivatives Yr and Nr are obtained by evaluating the slopes at r=0.

The rotating arm facility can also be used to determine Yv and Nv as well as Yr and Nr. By cross plotting the values of Yv and Nv obtained at each r-value against r, the values of Yv and Nv at r=0 can be obtained.

== Planar motion mechanism ==
The Planar motion mechanism (PMM) can be used instead of Rotating Arm Test where towing tank facilities are longer and narrower. It can measure velocity dependent derivatives Yv and Nv, the rotary derivatives Yr and Nr as well as the acceleration derivatives Yύ and N ύ.

The PMM consists of two oscillators, one of which produces a transverse oscillation at the bow and the other a transverse oscillation at the stern while the model moves down the towing tank at the constant velocity as measured along the centerline of the towing tank.

The DTMB Planar-Motion-Mechanism System was conceived and developed jointly by the Author and Mr. Alex Goodman, both members of the staff of the Hydromechanics Laboratory of the David Taylor Model Basin. Patent proceedings have been initiated in behalf of the United States Navy Department with the names of Messers. Gertler and Goodman as originators of the system. The originators wish to express their gratitude to the many members of the Industrial Department of the Model Basin whose contributions and efforts in the design and construction of components made the ultimate system possible. Particula: thanks are due to Messers. M. W. Wilson, J. E. Stern, T. G. Singleton, G. J. Norman, 3. W. Day, P. P. Day, C. W. Scott, 3. G. Tisdale, R. G. Hellyer, and E. J. Mosher, all of the Industrial Department. 40

== Propeller test ==
=== Open-water test ===
- It is carried out to determine the open water characteristics of a propeller. A geometrically similar model is produced with the model-prototype correlation.
- The model propeller is attached to a propeller dynamometer fitted in an open water boat.
- The dynamometer measures the thrust and torque of the propeller. The propeller shaft extends a sufficient length forward from the boat to ensure that the flow around the propeller is not disturbed by the boat.
- The test is conducted by towing the open water boat at a steady speed while running the propeller at a constant revolution rate. The speed of the boat (speed of advance VA), and the revolution rate n, thrust T and torque Q of the propeller are measured in each run.
- The speed of advance is varied in steps from zero to the value at which the propeller thrust just becomes negative.
- The open water characteristics of the model propeller can be easily calculated from the measured values of VA and n, and the corrected values T and Q.

=== Performance prediction method ===
Some of the formulations given by the ITTC 1978 for the performance prediction method are as follows:

VRM2 = VAM2 + (0.75π nM DM) 2

RncM = VRM cM / υM

KTS = KTM - ΔKT

KQS = KQM – ΔKQ

Where,

- VRM = resultant velocity of the blade section at 0.75R
- VAM = speed of advance of the model propeller
- nM = revolution rate of the model propeller
- DM = model propeller diameter
- RncM = Reynolds number of the model propeller
- cM = expanded blade width of the section at 0.75R of the model propeller
- υM = Kinematic viscosity of the water for model
- KTM, KTS = thrust coefficient of the model and ship propeller respectively
- KQM, KQS = torque coefficient of the model and ship propeller respectively

== See also ==
- Ship motions – Ships motions as defined by the six degrees of freedom of motion
- Ship stability – Ship response to disturbance from an upright condition
