= Water tunnel (hydrodynamic) =

Tool used to investigate the movement of water

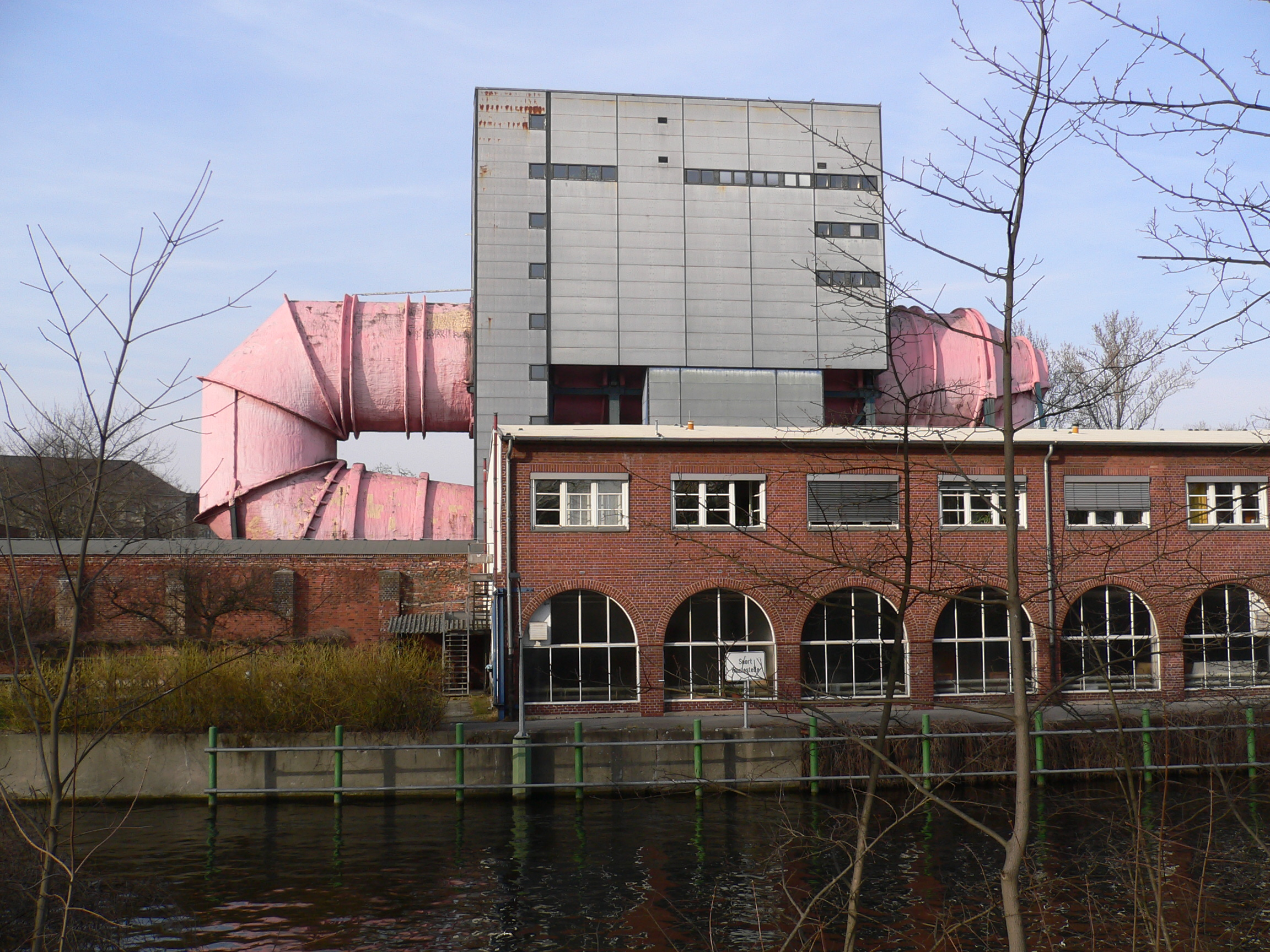
Cavitation tunnel of the Versuchsanstalt für Wasserbau und Schiffbau in Berlin

A water tunnel is an experimental facility used for testing the hydrodynamic behavior of submerged bodies in flowing water. It functions similar to a recirculating wind tunnel, but uses water as the working fluid, and related phenomena are investigated, such as measuring the forces on scale models of submarines or lift and drag on hydrofoils. Water tunnels are sometimes used in place of wind tunnels to perform measurements because techniques like particle image velocimetry (PIV) are easier to implement in water. For many cases as long as the Reynolds number is equivalent, the results are valid, whether a submerged water vehicle model is tested in air or an aerial vehicle is tested in water. For low Reynolds number flows, tunnels can use oil instead of water. The advantage is that the increased viscosity will allow the flow to be a higher speed (and thus easier to maintain in a stable manner) for a lower Reynolds number.

Often, a tunnel will be co-located with other experimental facilities such as a wave flume at a Ship model basin.

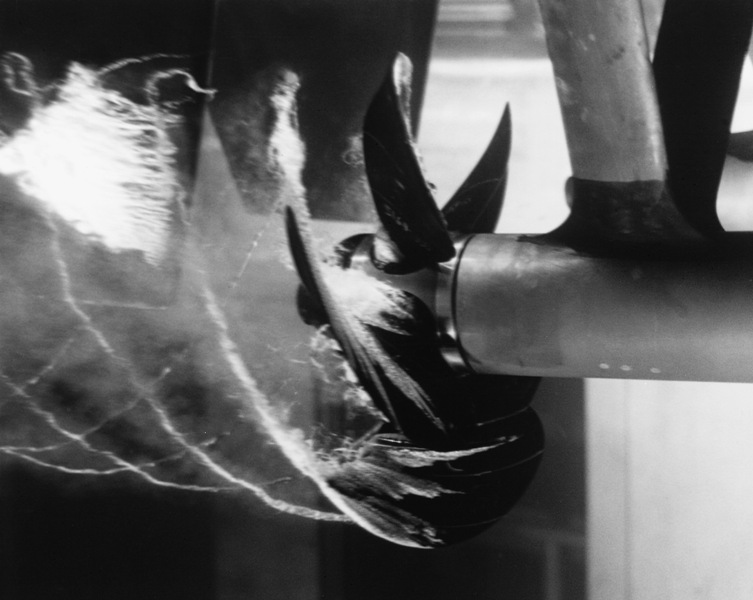
Cavitating propeller model in 'David Taylor Model Basin'

== Cavitation studies ==
Because it is a high-speed phenomenon, a special procedure is needed to visualize cavitation. The propeller, attached to a dynamometer, is placed in the inflow, and its thrust and torque is measured at different ratios of propeller speed (number of revolutions) to inflow velocity. A stroboscope synchronized with the propeller speed "freezes" the cavitation bubble. By this means, it is possible to determine if the propeller would be damaged by cavitation. To ensure similarity to the full-scale propeller, the pressure is lowered, and the gas content of the water is controlled.

== List of water tunnels (cavitation tunnels) ==
=== Australia ===
- "Australian Maritime College". AMC

=== Brazil ===
- Laboratory of Naval and Oceanic Engineering (NAVAL), Institute for Technological Research (IPT) of São Paulo.

=== Canada ===
- National Research Council—Institute for Ocean Technology Cavitation Tunnel, St. John's, Newfoundland.

=== France ===
- "Tunnel de Cavitation" Ecole Navale, Lanveoc
- "Grand Tunnel Hydrodynamique" Bassin d'Essais des Carènes, Val de Reuil
- "TH8.2V : Tunnels Hydrodynamiques 8 ou 2 m3/s" Centre d'études et de recherche de Grenoble

=== Germany ===
- Multiple cavitation tunnels at the Versuchsanstalt für Wasserbau und Schiffbau, Berlin
- Cavitation tunnel at the University Duisburg-Essen, Institute of Ship Technology, Ocean Engineering and Transport Systems, University Duisburg-Essen
- Cavitation tunnel at Potsdam Ship Model Basin, Potsdam
- Large Cavitation tunnel at Hamburg Ship Model Basin, Hamburg
- Multiple cavitation tunnels at the Oskar von Miller Institut, Technical University of Munich

=== India ===
- Fluid Control Research Institute, Palakkad, Kerala.
- Cavitation Tunnel of the Naval Science and Technology Labs at Visakhapatnam.
- Department of Aerospace Engineering, Indian Institute of Technology, Kharagpur
- Indian Institute of Technology Madras.

=== Iran ===
- Applied Hydrodynamics Laboratory, Iran University of Science and Technology, Narmak, Tehran.
- Marine Engineering Laboratory, Sharif University of Technology, Azadi Av., Tehran.

=== Italy ===
- Department of Naval Architecture, University of Genoa.
- INSEAN Cavitation facility, INSEAN (National Institute of Studies and Experiments in Naval Architecture), Rome.

=== The Netherlands ===
- Large Cavitation Tunnel and High Speed Cavitation Tunnel at Maritime Research Institute Netherlands in Wageningen
- Twente Water Tunnel facility at University of Twente

=== Norway ===
- Cavitation Lab NTNU, The Norwegian University of Science and Technology, Trondheim

=== Spain ===
- CEHIPAR (Canal de Experiencias Hidrodinámicas de El Pardo), El Pardo (Madrid), Spain.

=== Serbia ===
- The Large Cavitation Tunnel at Military Technical Institute Belgrade, Serbia

=== Switzerland ===
- High Speed Cavitation Tunnel at LMH: Lab. of Hydraulic Machines, EPFL: Ecole Polytechnique Federale de Lausanne, Switzerland

=== Taiwan ===
- Large Cavitation Tunnel at National Taiwan Ocean University (國立臺灣海洋大學) from Zhongzheng, Keelung, Taiwan
- Large Cavitation Tunnel at National Cheng Kung University (國立成功大學) from East, Tainan, Taiwan
- Large Cavitation Tunnel at National Taiwan University (國立臺灣大學) from Da'an, Taipei, Taiwan also look at sea transportation in Taiwan
- Large Cavitation Tunnel at National Kaohsiung Marine University (國立高雄海洋科技大學) from Nanzih, Kaohsiung, Taiwan

=== Turkey ===
- ITÜ Cavitation Tunnel at Istanbul Technical University, Turkey

=== United Kingdom ===
- Emerson Cavitation Tunnel, University of Newcastle upon Tyne.
- Haslar Marine Technology Park (the former Admiralty Experiment Works), Gosport.

=== United States ===
- The Garfield Thomas Water Tunnel The Pennsylvania State University, State College, PA
- The William B. Morgan Large Cavitation Channel, Memphis, TN
- David Taylor Model Basin, Carderock Division of the Naval Surface Warfare Center
- Water Tunnel, The University of North Carolina at Charlotte, Charlotte, NC

== See also ==
- Wave tank
- Wind tunnel
