= Maritime Research Institute Netherlands =

Dutch research institute

MARIN, the Maritime Research Institute Netherlands, provides hydrodynamic research and maritime technology services including a combination of simulation, model testing, full-scale measurements, and training programmes. MARIN serves the shipbuilding industry, the offshore industry, and governments. Customers include commercial shipbuilders, fleet owners, naval architects, classification societies, oil and LNG companies, and navies.

In the Netherlands MARIN has the status of Great Technological Institute, thus linking science and applied knowledge. Results from fundamental research are directly integrated in applications for clients. Over 85% of the turnover is realised by commercial projects for the international maritime industry. The remaining 15% is derived from scientific research.

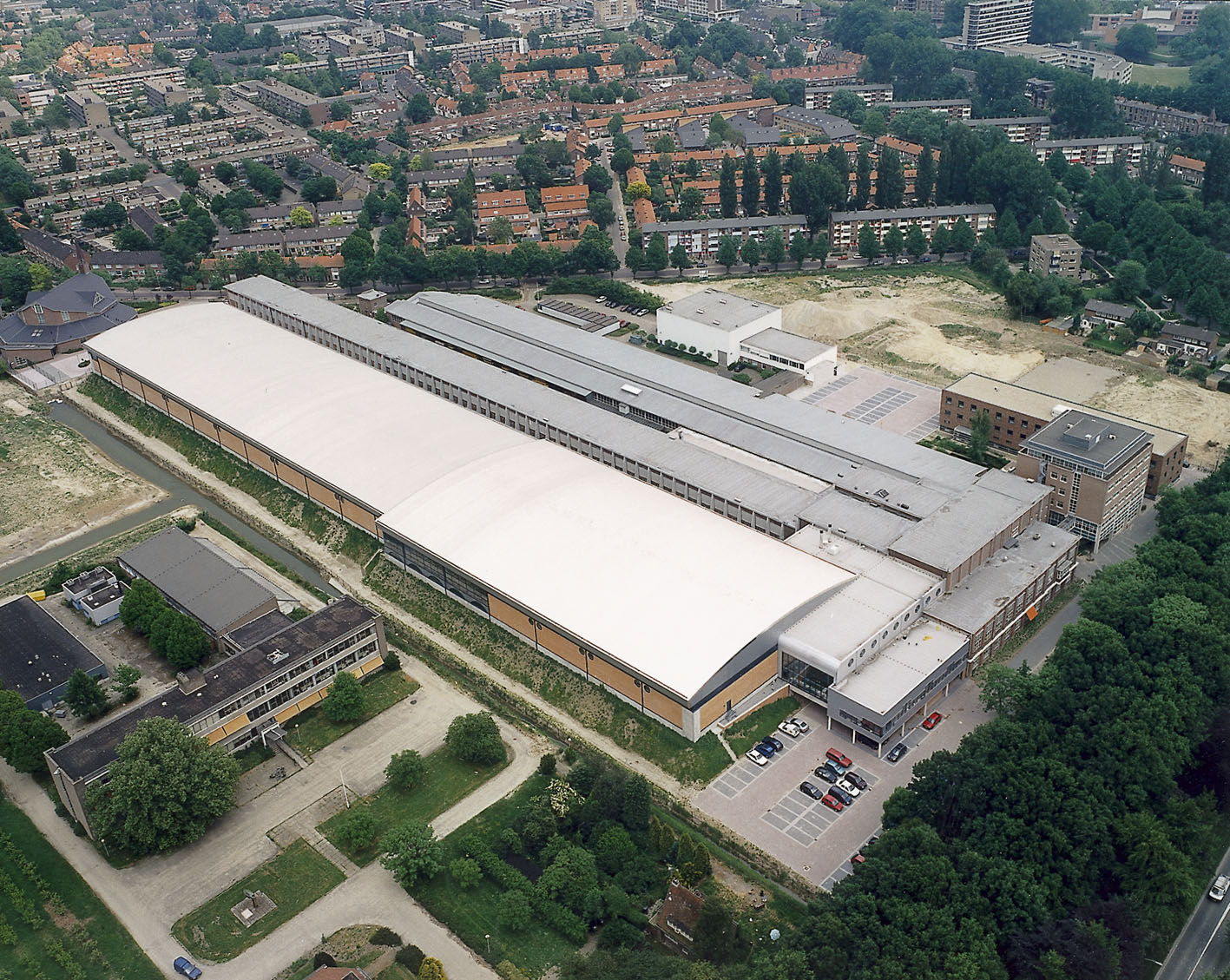
MARIN Wageningen

== Offices ==
MARIN’s head office is in Wageningen, with additional offices in Ede, Houston, and Annapolis. The institute partners internationally with Oceânica Offshore in Brazil, Singapore Polytechnic/CEMS in Singapore, and the Shanghai Ship and Shipping Research Institute (as the SSSRI-MARIN JV joint venture) in China. MARIN has about 450 employees (2022) from 40 countries, nine test facilities (of which basins, tanks and labs) and several simulators.

== History ==
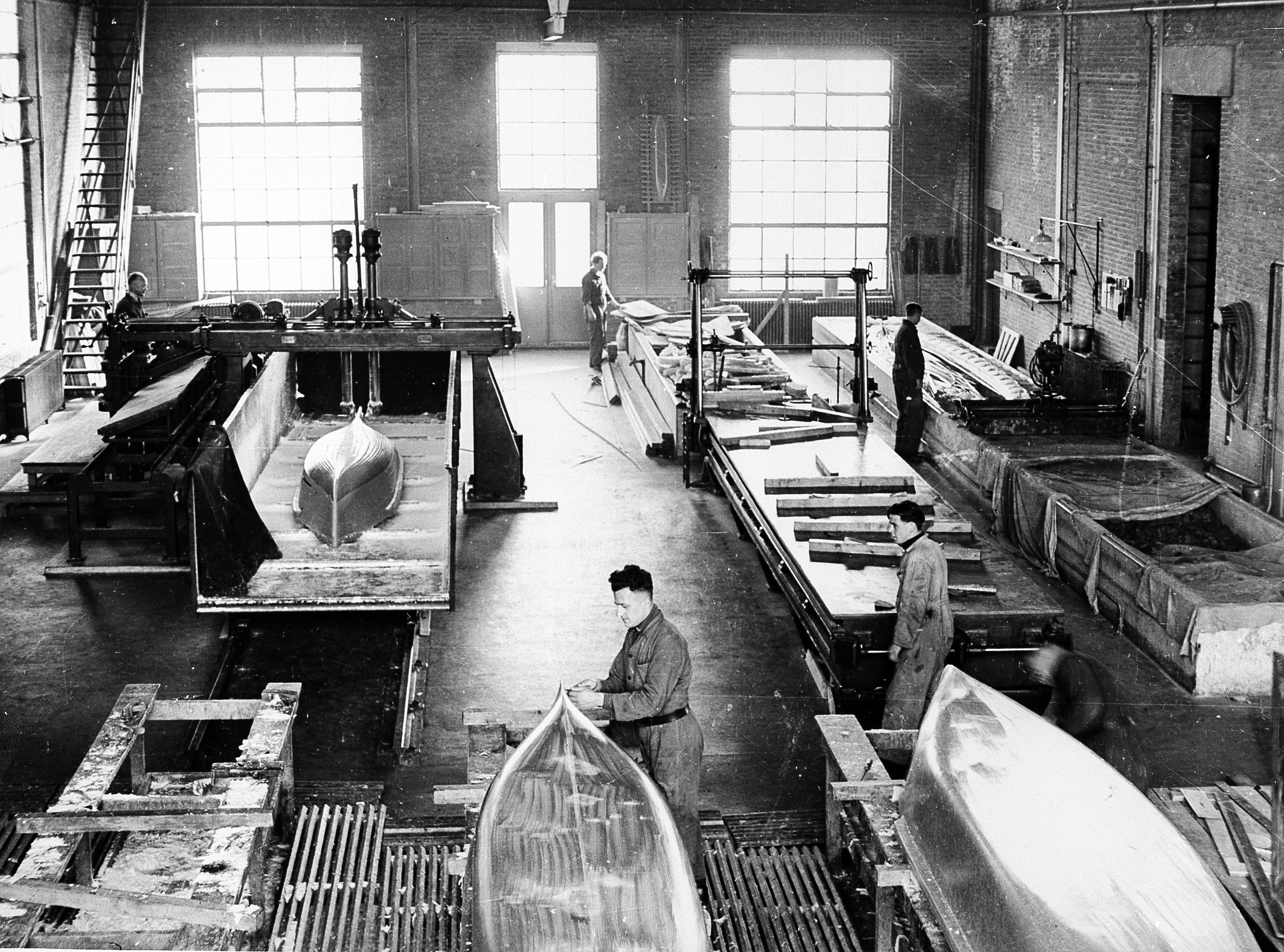
Modelling shop

The history of what is now MARIN dates to 1873, when the first model tests in the Netherlands were carried out. Bruno Tideman, senior engineer in the Navy and advisor for the shipbuilding industry, carried out tests with marine cruiser Atjeh to measure resistance and required engine power.

Following the 1922 economic depression and subsequent recovery of the shipbuilding industry, the first towing tank was built in the Netherlands. This project was realized thanks to contributions from several parties; the Stoomvaart Maatschappij Nederland (Netherland Line), Royal Rotterdam Lloyd, Koninklijke Paketvaart-Maatschappij (Royal Packet Navigation Company) and Nederlandsch-Indische Tankstoomboot-Maatschappij (Dutch-Indies Tank Steamers) were prepared to pay half the foundation costs, and the remaining 350,000 Dutch guilders were paid by the Dutch government. This was the start of the NSP (Dutch Shipbuilding Testing Facility Foundation), the basis of today’s MARIN.

In April 1932, the NSP was put into operation. After the Towing Tank (today’s Deepwater Tank) was filled with water, the first towing tests were carried out. On 9 May 1932 the NSP was officially opened; at the time, the institute consisted of the single towing tank and a model production facility and had no permanent employees. In that first year, 1932, the number of orders booked was far higher than expected, bringing the NSP a revenue of 25,000 Dutch guilders (11,360 Euro), a promising result given its operating costs of 30,000 guilders. Favorable results persisted in the following years.

By 1938 the number of employees had grown to 36, necessitating the construction of additional offices. The demand for model tests grew steadily and, in 1941, led to the construction of a large cavitation tunnel for research into propeller cavitation. A second round of expansion took place in 1952; the Deepwater Tank was extended by 92 m to 252 m and the NSP's design department increased considerably in size.

In the 1950s and 1960s, great demand for specialist research required the construction of additional, more sophisticated test facilities. The first was the Seakeeping Basin (1956) for research into ships' behavior in waves. Next came the Shallow Water Basin (1958), designed for tugboats, inland shipping and merchandise shipping in shallow water.

In 1965, the High Speed Basin and Wave and Current Basin were developed and began operation. In the High Speed Basin, tests are carried out with ship models or appendages propelled at very high speeds; in the Wave and Current Basin (now the Offshore Basin), wind, current and waves are simulated for research into the behavior of structures during complex operations at sea, such as oil and gas production and dredging operations.

In 1970 the Maneuvering Simulator was built to find solutions for ever more complex maneuvering operations and because of increased interest in the relation between man and ship.

In 1972 the institute was further extended with a Vacuum Tank at Ede for research into problems caused by propeller cavitation.

In 1980, NSP merged with NMI (Rotterdam) to form the modern-day MARIN.

In 1986, MARIN developed the first of its Vessel Traffic Service simulators, serving as a training site for VTS operators.

In 1998, MARIN opened its first international satellite office in Houston, Texas in the United States, aimed at connecting with US clients and providing support. A second US office was announced in the Chesapeake Bay region in 2018.

In 2000 and 2001, the former Seakeeping Basin and Wave and Current Basin were replaced, becoming the Seakeeping and Maneuvering Basin and Offshore Basin respectively.

In 2012, flap-type wave makers were added on two sides to the Vacuum Tank, which was renamed the Depressurized Wave Basin (DWB).

== External URL ==
- Official website
