= Ship model basin =

Water tank used to carry out hydrodynamic tests

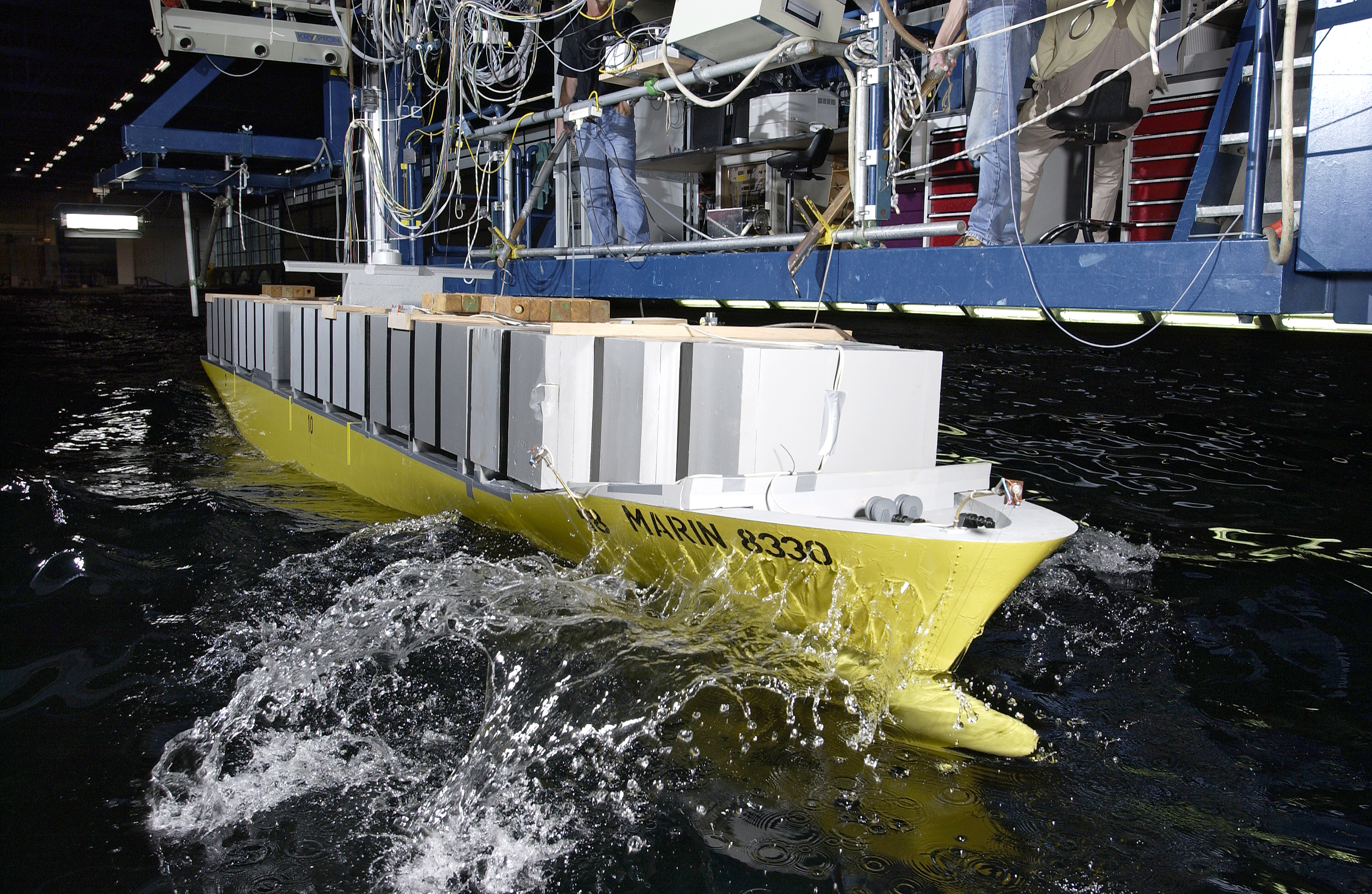
Model of Emma Mærsk undergoing testing in a ship model basin

A ship model basin is a basin or tank used to carry out hydrodynamic tests with ship models, for the purpose of designing a new (full sized) ship, or refining the design of a ship to improve the ship's performance at sea. It can also refer to the organization (often a company) that owns and operates such a facility.

An engineering firm acts as a contractor to the relevant shipyards, and provides hydrodynamic model tests and numerical calculations to support the design and development of ships and offshore structures.

== History ==
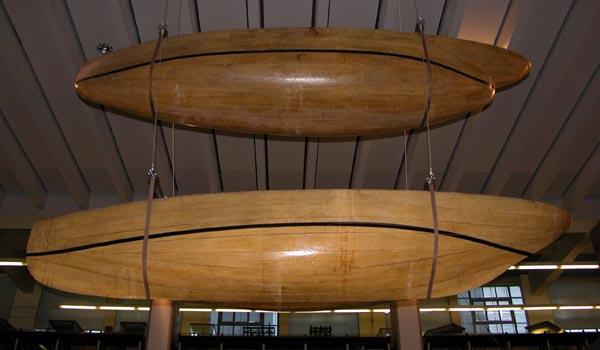
12 foot model hulls used by William Froude in scale model testing of stability, on display in the Science museum

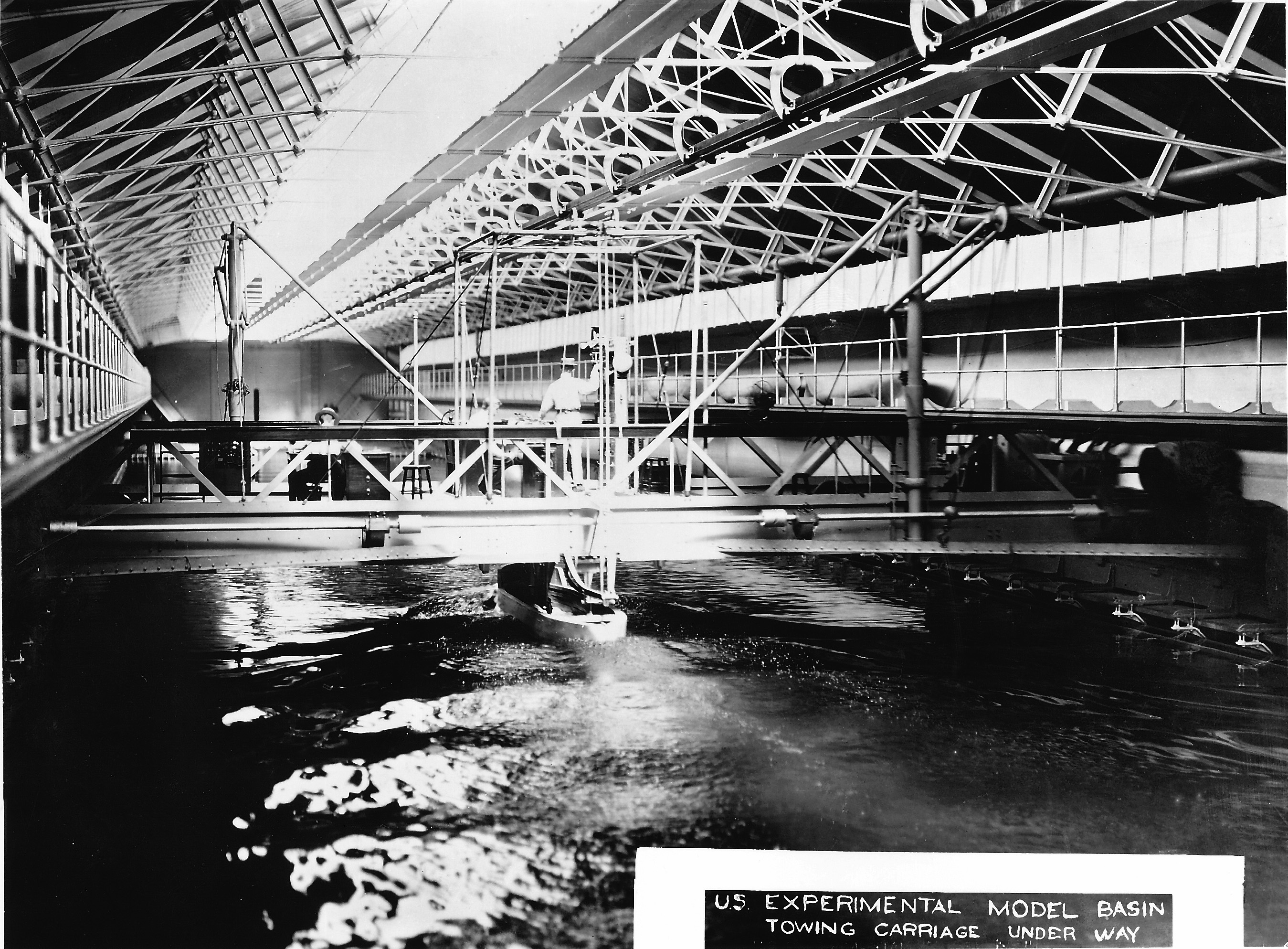
US Experimental Model Basin, circa 1900

The eminent English engineer William Froude published a series of influential papers on ship designs for maximising stability in the 1860s. The Institution of Naval Architects eventually commissioned him to identify the most efficient hull shape. He validated his theoretical models with extensive empirical testing, using scale models for the different hull dimensions. He established a formula (now known as the Froude number) by which the results of small-scale tests could be used to predict the behaviour of full-sized hulls. He built a sequence of 3, 6 and (shown in the picture) 12 foot scale models and used them in towing trials to establish resistance and scaling laws. His experiments were later vindicated in full-scale trials conducted by the Admiralty and as a result the first ship model basin was built, at public expense, at his home in Torquay. Here he was able to combine mathematical expertise with practical experimentation to such good effect that his methods are still followed today.

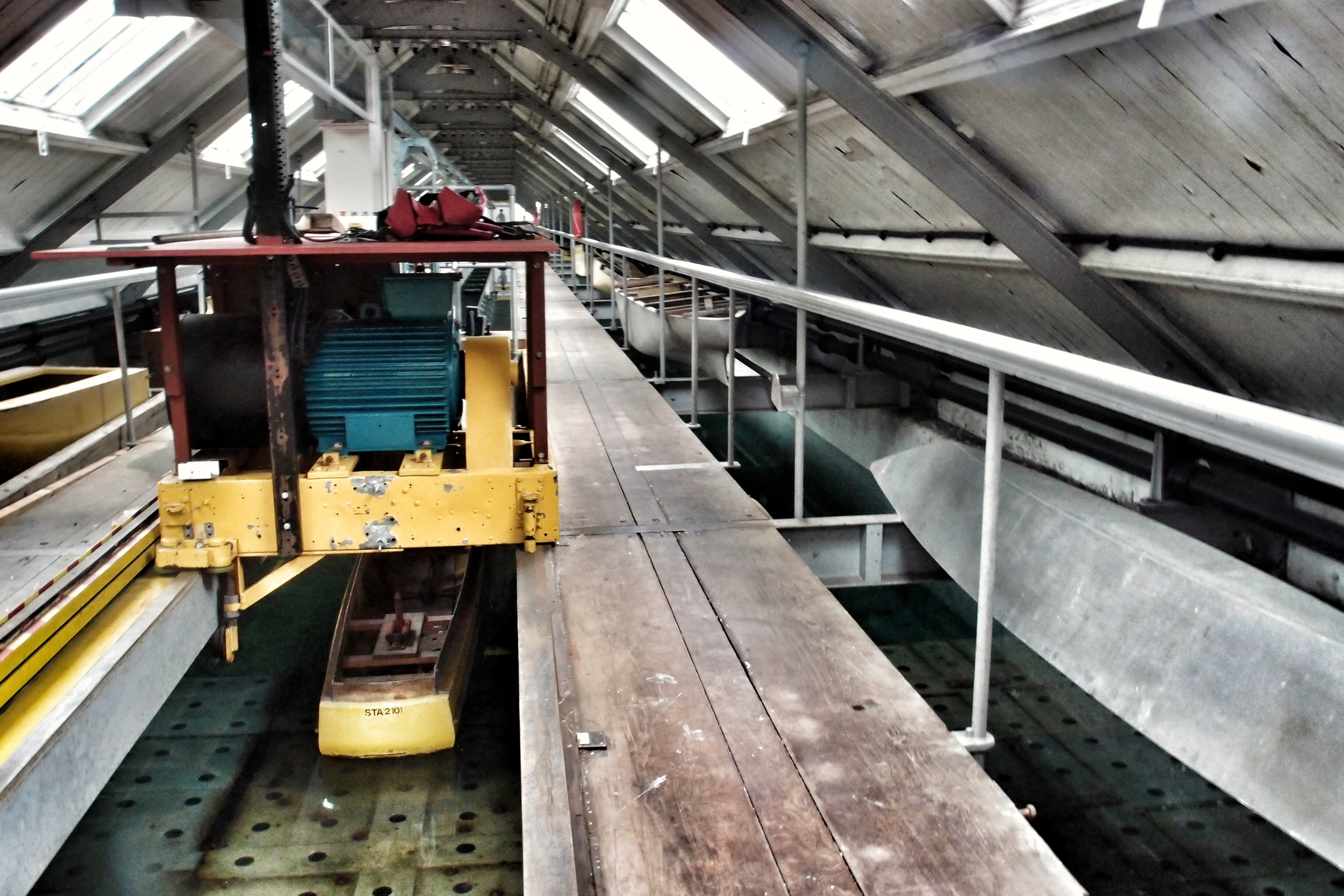
The Denny Tank, the world's first commercial testing tank.

Inspired by Froude's successful work, shipbuilding company William Denny and Brothers completed the world's first commercial example of a ship model basin in 1883. The facility was used to test models of a variety of vessels and explored various propulsion methods, including propellers, paddles and vane wheels. Experiments were carried out on models of the Denny-Brown stabilisers and the Denny hovercraft to gauge their feasibility. Tank staff also carried out research and experiments for other companies: Belfast-based Harland & Wolff decided to fit a bulbous bow on the liner Canberra after successful model tests in the Denny Tank.

== Test facilities ==
The hydrodynamic test facilities present at a model basin site include at least a towing tank and a cavitation tunnel and workshops. Some ship model basins have further facilities such as a maneuvering and seakeeping basin and an ice tank.

=== Towing tank ===
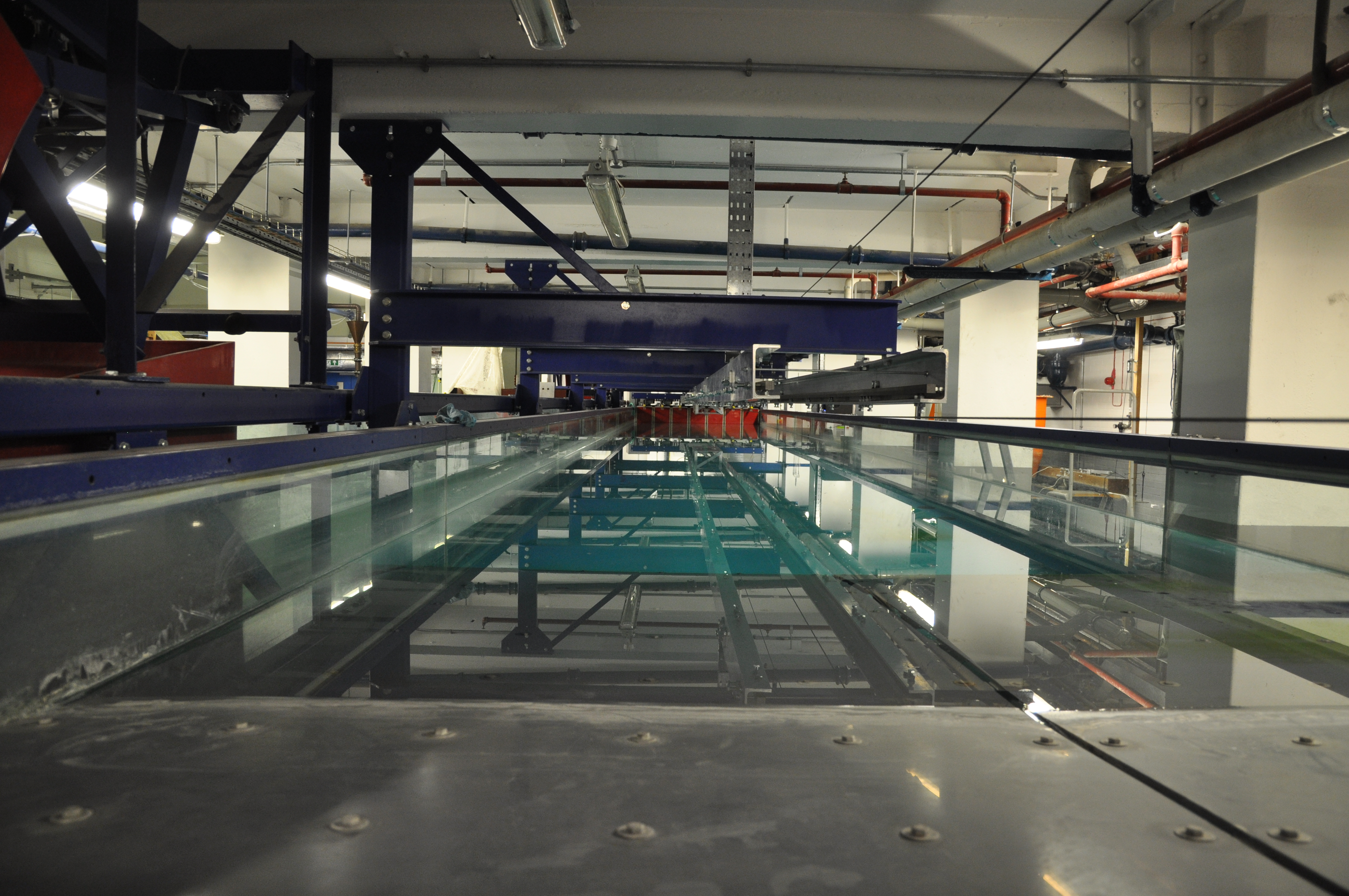
The Ocean Towing Tank - with both towing and wave making facilities - at University College London

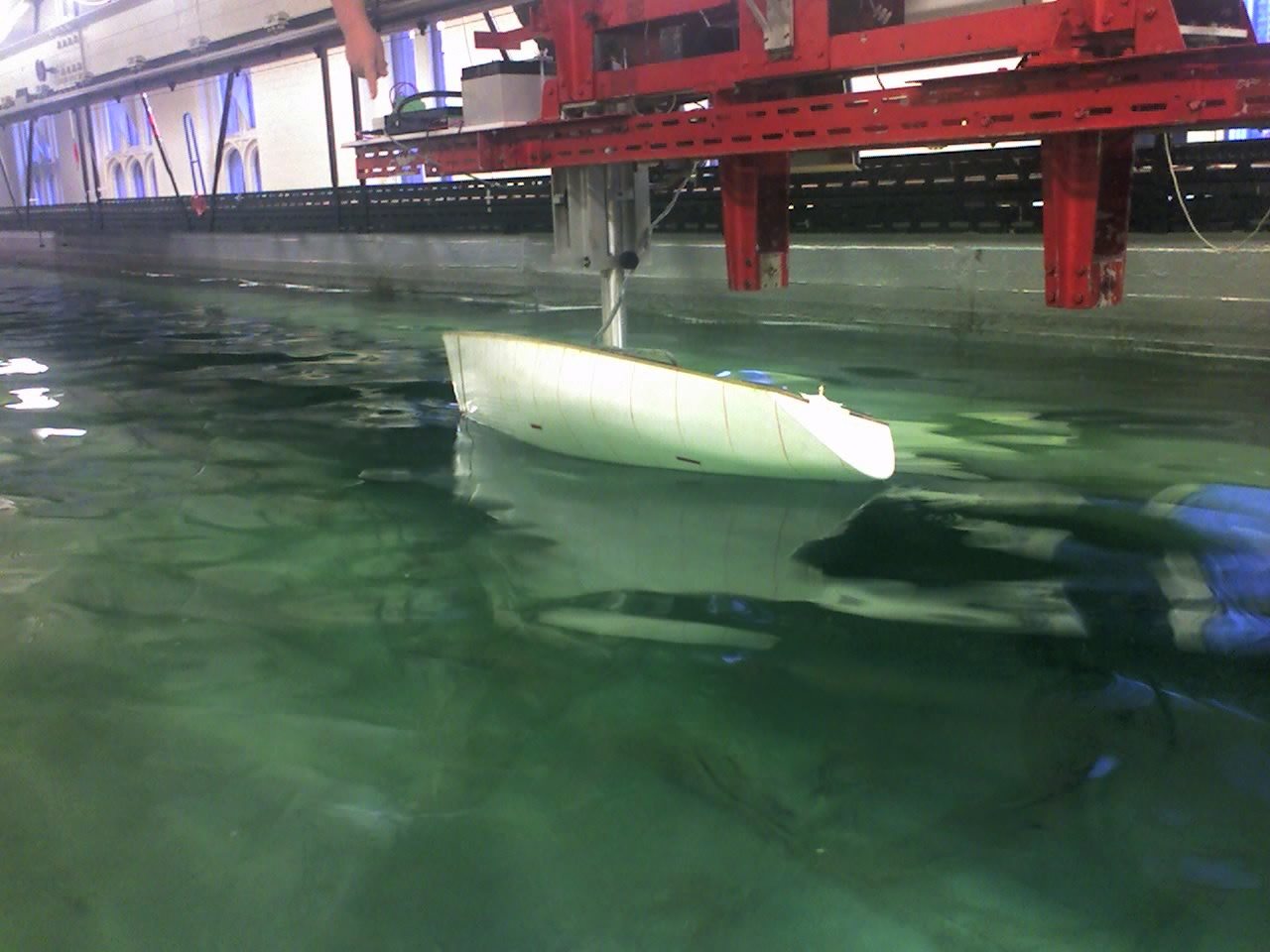
A model being tested in the Towing Tank of Newcastle University.

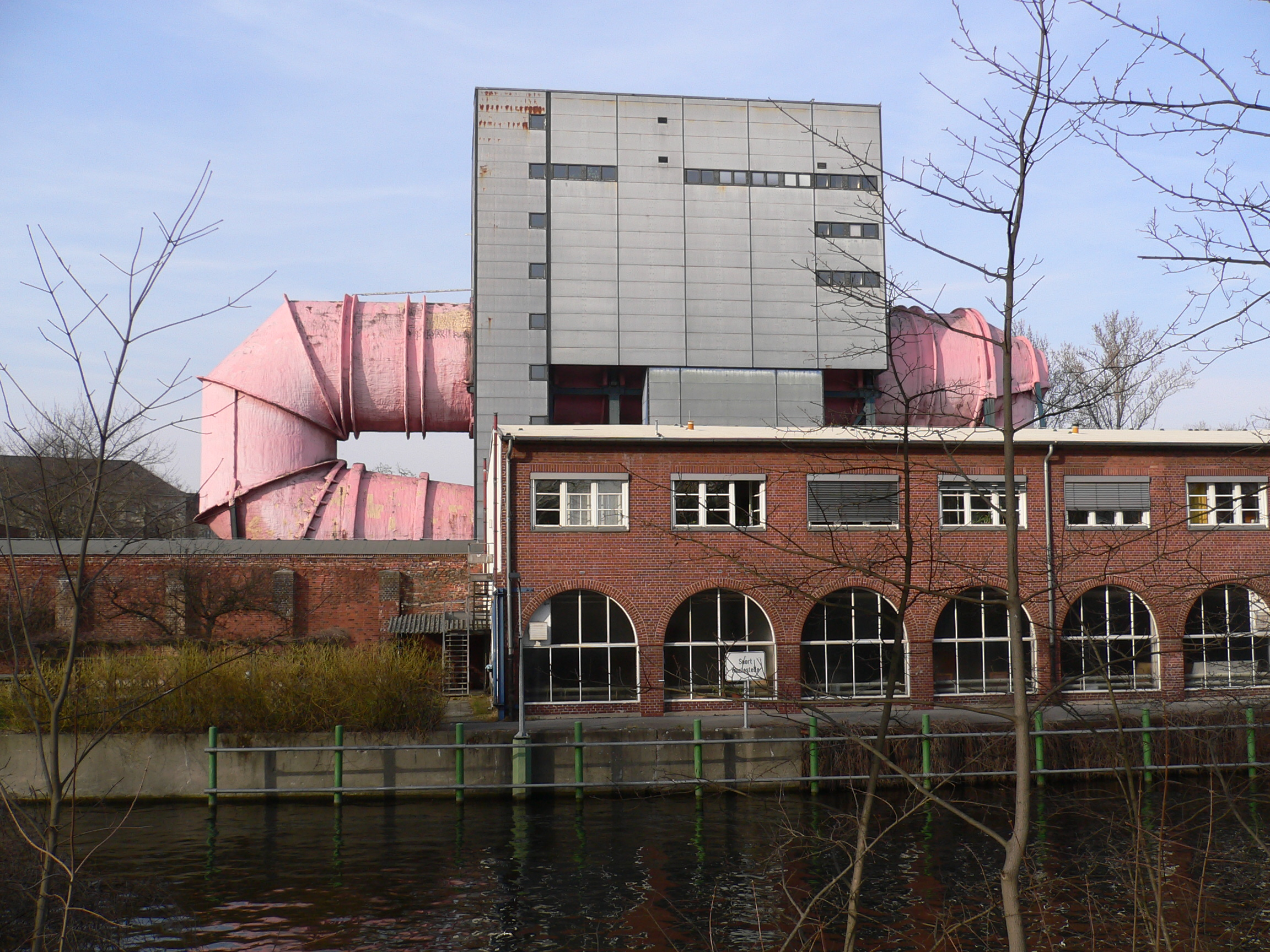
Cavitation tunnel of the Versuchsanstalt für Wasserbau und Schiffbau in Berlin

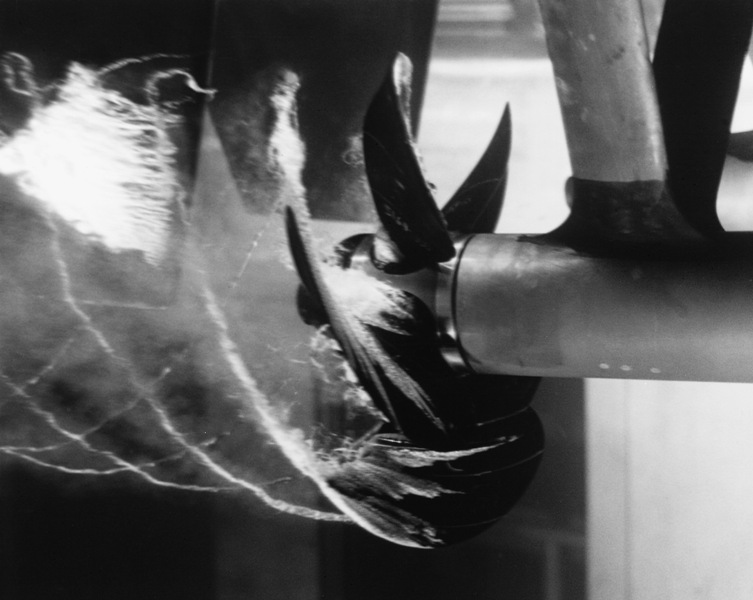
Cavitating propeller in a water tunnel experiment at the David Taylor Model Basin

A towing tank is a basin, several metres wide and hundreds of metres long, equipped with a towing carriage that runs on two rails on either side. The towing carriage can either tow the model or follow the self-propelled model, and is equipped with computers and devices to register or control, respectively, variables such as speed, propeller thrust and torque, rudder angle etc. The towing tank serves for resistance and propulsion tests with towed and self-propelled ship models to determine how much power the engine will have to provide to achieve the speed laid down in the contract between shipyard and ship owner. The towing tank also serves to determine the maneuvering behaviour in model scale. For this, the self-propelled model is exposed to a series of zig-zag maneuvers at different rudder angle amplitudes. Post-processing of the test data by means of system identification results in a numerical model to simulate any other maneuver like Dieudonné spiral test or turning circles. Additionally, a towing tank can be equipped with a PMM (planar motion mechanism) or a CPMC (computerized planar motion carriage) to measure the hydrodynamic forces and moments on ships or submerged objects under the influence of oblique inflow and enforced motions. The towing tank can also be equipped with a wave generator to carry out seakeeping tests, either by simulating natural (irregular) waves or by exposing the model to a wave packet that yields a set of statistics known as response amplitude operators (acronym RAO), that determine the ship's likely real-life sea-going behavior when operating in seas with varying wave amplitudes and frequencies (these parameters being known as sea states). Modern seakeeping test facilities can determine these RAO statistics, with the aid of appropriate computer hardware and software, in a single test.

=== Cavitation tunnel ===
A cavitation tunnel is used to investigate propellers. This is a vertical water circuit with large diameter pipes. At the top, it carries the measuring facilities. A parallel inflow is established. With or without a ship model, the propeller, attached to a dynamometer, is brought into the inflow, and its thrust and torque is measured at different ratios of propeller speed (number of revolutions) to inflow velocity. A stroboscope synchronized with the propeller speed serves to visualize cavitation as if the cavitation bubble would not move. By this, one can observe if the propeller would be damaged by cavitation. To ensure similarity to the full-scale propeller, the pressure is lowered, and the gas content of the water is controlled.

=== Workshops ===
Ship model basins manufacture their ship models from wood or paraffin with a computerized milling machine. Some of them also manufacture their model propellers. Equipping the ship models with all drives and gauges and manufacturing equipment for non-standard model tests are the main tasks of the workshops.

=== Maneuvering and seakeeping basin ===
This is a test facility that is wide enough to investigate arbitrary angles between waves and the ship model, and to perform maneuvers like turning circles, for which the towing tank is too narrow. However, some important maneuvers like the spiral test still require even more space and still have to be simulated numerically after system identification.

=== Ice tank ===
An ice tank is used to develop ice breaking vessels, this tank fulfills similar purposes as the towing tank does for open water vessels. Resistance and required engine power as well as maneuvering behaviour are determined depending on the ice thickness. Also ice forces on offshore structures can be determined. Ice layers are frozen with a special procedure to scale down the ice crystals to model scale.

== Software ==
Additionally, these companies or authorities have CFD software and experience to simulate the complicated flow around ships and their rudders and propellers numerically. Today's state of the art does not yet allow software to replace model tests in their entirety by CFD calculations. One reason, but not the only one, is that elementization is still expensive. Also the lines design of some of the ships is carried out by the specialists of the ship model basin, either from the beginning or by optimizing the initial design obtained from the shipyard. The same applies to the design of propellers.

== Examples ==
The ship model basins worldwide are organized in the ITTC (International Towing Tank Conference) to standardize their model test procedures.

Some of the most significant ship model basins are:

- Denny Tank in Dumbarton, Scotland. The Denny tank was the first commercial ship model basin.
- Current Meter Rating Trolly, CMC Division, CWPRS Pune, India
- SINTEF Ocean, towing tank, ocean basin, cavitation tunnel in Trondheim, Norway
- High speed towing tank - Wolfson Unit MTIA - specialists in high performance power and sail.
- David Taylor Model Basin and the Davidson Laboratory at the Carderock Division of the Naval Surface Warfare Center in the United States
- High Speed Towing Tank facility at Naval Science and Technological Labs at Vizag India
- The Institute for Ocean Technology in St. Johns, Canada
- FORCE Technology in Lyngby, Denmark
- SSPA, in Gothenburg, Sweden
- Laboratory of Naval and Oceanic Engineering of Institute for Technological Research of São Paulo in São Paulo, Brazil.
- Maritime Research Institute Netherlands (MARIN) in Wageningen, the Netherlands
- CNR-INSEAN in Rome, Italy
- University of Naples Federico II in Naples, Italy
- SVA Potsdam in Potsdam, Germany
- HSVA in Hamburg, Germany
- "Bassin d'essai des carènes" in Val de Reuil, France
- CEHIPAR in Madrid, Spain
- CTO S.A.] in Gdansk, Poland
- FloWaveTT in Edinburgh, Scotland
- Krylov state research centre Крыловский государственный научный центр in Saint-Petersburg, Russia
- National Maritime Research Institute (NMRI) in Tokyo, Japan
- China Ship Scientific Research Center(CSSRC) in Wuxi, China
- Rosa Röhre in Berlin, Germany
