= Indian Register of Shipping =

Indian ship classification society

Indian Register of Shipping (IRClass)
- Company type: Non-Profit Organisation, Public Ltd. Company
- Industry: Shipbuilding
- Genre: Classification Society
- Founded: 1975
- Headquarters: Powai, Mumbai, Maharashtra, India
- Area served: Global
- Key people: Arun Sharma (Executive Chairman)
- Services: Classification
- Website: irclass.org

Indian Register of Shipping (IRClass) is an internationally recognised, independent ship classification society, founded in India in 1975. It is a public limited company incorporated under Section 25 of the Indian Companies Act, 1956 (Section 8 of Indian Companies Act 2013). It is a Non-Profit organisation, Public undertaking and a member of the 12 member International Association of Classification Societies (IACS). It was inducted into IACS along with Croatian Register of Shipping (CRS) and Polish Register of Shipping (PRS).

Today, IRClass acts on behalf of the Maritime Administration of the Government of India as the sole authority for final assignment of Load Lines in Indian flag vessels and also as the security organisation that determines compliance under the International Ship and Port Facility Security Code (ISPS) code for Indian flag ships and port facilities.

IRClass provides independent third party technical inspection and certification services for all types of ships, marine craft and structures. These services have also been expanded to cover a range of offshore and industrial projects and are designed to meet ISO 9001 specifications (the International Standard on Quality Management Systems).

Indian Register of Shipping was established as a public limited company in March 1975 and has been providing ship classification services. In addition, they establish standards and formulate rules for the construction and maintenance of ships, amphibious installation, marine equipment and industrial and general engineering equipment. They also undertake approval of designs, survey and to issue reports on land installations, machinery, materials and apparatus of all kinds.

== History ==
Indian Register of Shipping was founded in 1975 to act as a catalyst of self-regulation by Indian Shipping Industries and to serve as a forum for research and development.

Here are some important milestones in its history

- 1975 – IRS was established and registered under section 25 (erstwhile section 8) of the Companies Act, 1956 as not for profit public limited company. In the same year dual class agreements for mutual cooperation were signed with the American Bureau of Shipping, Lloyd's Register of Shipping and Det Norske Veritas, the first register of ships was also published in the same year.
- 1977 - IRS published its first rule book.
- 1979 - IRS was authorised by the Indian Government to assign load lines on Indian flag vessels. In the same year it diversified its activities to include inspection for land based industries.
- 1983 – dual class agreement with Bureau Veritas.
- 1984 – dual class agreement with Germanischer Lloyd.
- 1991 – IRS became an associate of the IACS.
- 1997 – IRS was appointed by the Maritime Administration of the Indian Government as the sole authority for final assignment of Load Line in Indian flag vessels.
- 1998 – IRS was appointed as the only recognised organisation for conducting audits under the ISM Code for all Indian flag vessels.
- 2000 – The International Underwriting Association under the Institution Classification Clause recognises the IRS. By virtue of this ships classified under the IRS would not attract any extra insurance. This was a first for an Associate Member.
- 2004 - The International Ship and Port Facility Security Code (ISPS) came into effect. IRS was appointed as the sole recognised security organisation to determine compliance under the code for Indian flag ships and port facilities.
- 2010 – IRS becomes a full member of IACS.
- 2016 – IRS receives recognition from European Commission EC.
- 2018 – IRS takes over as Vice Chairman of IACS.
- 2019 – IRS elected as Chairman of IACS.
- 2020 - India's first LNG-FSRU ship was certified under IRClass specification.

== Organisation & Management ==
IRS is a non-profit making organisation. All funds generated from fees for classification services are used solely for the performance of such services. A surplus of receipts in any one year is used for the extension and improvement of the services, including research and development. It has a Committee of Management with representatives from the Ministry and from each industry segment that uses its services. IRS has 25 offices located all over India. It has overseas offices at Bangladesh, China, Greece, Indonesia, Netherlands, Qatar, Singapore, South Korea, Sri Lanka, Thailand, UAE, UK and United States.

== Services ==
=== Statutory Services ===
IRS carries out statutory design appraisal, surveys and certification work on behalf of Flag States, when so authorised by the Governments of such states via the International Maritime Organisation Conventions and Codes . The four major IMO conventions are:

- International Convention on Loadline
- International Convention for the safety of Life at Sea (SOLAS)
- International Tonnage Convention
- International Convention on Maritime Pollution Prevention (MARPOL)

=== Non-Classification Services ===
==== Specification Services ====
IRS surveyors who are seconded in to the owners for technical advisory and supervisory services operate independently. IRS specification services have been used extensively by various ship owners including national administrations, port authorities, oil companies etc. Specification services are provided for pre-contract as well as post-contract stages.

Pre-contract services include:

- Advice for preparation of inquiry documents for tendering
- Appraisal of tender bids from shipbuilders
- Power estimation
- Fuel consumption, endurance and capacities for consumables
- Trim and stability calculations
- General layout and space concepts
- Cargo capacities and handling arrangements
- Selection of propulsion and auxiliary machinery
- Advice for painting and corrosion protection scheme.

==== Post-contract services ====
Design appraisal is done at the early stages to ensure that proposed arrangement conforms to the agreed specification. The design appraisal could cover model-testing program for power estimation, sea keeping and maneuvering.

Generally the following plans are verified for ensuring compliance with specification:

- Hull and superstructure
- All machinery systems
- Loading conditions
- Tank arrangement and capacities
- Electrical and control system
- Painting specification and corrosion control system
- Communication systems and navigational equipment
- Safety equipment and life saving appliances

==== Supervision during all stages of construction ====
At the shipyard, comprehensive supervision is provided during all stages of constructions including tests and trials. Owners are appraised at monthly or agreed intervals about progress, deviations, from specifications and other pertinent facts of owners interest. Visits are arranged to the sub-contractor's work sites to inspect major items of machinery and equipment to ensure compliance with specifications and agreed standards of workmanship.

==== Supervision during major modification and repair ====
This includes a broad range of focus areas like:

- Examination of existing plans of a vessel to assess its suitability for modifications
- Examination of the existing condition of a vessel
- Assisting owners in evaluation of contractors
- Supervision of modification work

=== Damage Surveys ===
Damage surveys on hull, machinery, equipment and permanent fittings on classed or nonclassed ships are done at the request of ship owners or any other interested parties such as underwriters, and factual reports are issued to the parties.

This service includes survey of damage:

- To establish nature, extent and cause of damage
- Recommendation of repairs
- Supervision and certification of repair done
- Final endorsement of repair bills.

== See also ==
- Classification Society
- International Association of Classification Societies
- International Maritime Organization
- Coastal India
- Exclusive economic zone of India
- Fishing in India
- Outline of India
