= International Association of Classification Societies =

Non-governmental organization

The International Association of Classification Societies (IACS) is a technically based non-governmental organization that currently consists of twelve member marine classification societies. More than 90% of the world's cargo-carrying ships’ tonnage is covered by the classification standards set by member societies of IACS.

Marine classification is a system for promoting the safety of life, property and the environment primarily through the establishment and verification of compliance with technical and engineering standards for the design, construction and life-cycle maintenance of ships, offshore units and other marine-related facilities. These standards are contained in rules established by each Society. IACS provides a forum within which the member societies can discuss, research, and adopt technical criteria that enhance maritime safety and environmental protection.

== History ==
IACS traces its origins to the recommendations of the International Convention on Load Lines of 1930. The convention recommended collaboration between classification societies to secure "as much uniformity as possible in the application of the standards of strength upon which freeboard is based...".

Following the convention, Registro Italiano Navale (RINA) hosted the first conference of major societies in 1939 - attended by ABS, BV, DNV, GL, LR and NK - which agreed on further cooperation between the societies.

A second major class society conference, held in 1955, led to the creation of working parties on specific topics and, in 1968, to the formation of IACS by seven leading societies.

IACS was founded on September 11, 1968, in Hamburg, Germany and its headquarters are currently in London.

In 1969, IACS was given consultative status by the IMO. Its membership has increased since that time to twelve. DNV and Germanischer Lloyd merged in 2013; the new entity was called DNV GL but changed to DNV in 2021.

Because of the 2022 Russian invasion of Ukraine, IACS withdrew the membership of Russian Maritime Register of Shipping (RMRS) on March 11, 2022. The RMRS attracted support from only 25% of members in the vote to expel it.

As of February 2024, IACS has 12 members, collectively representing over 90% of the global tonnage, with Türk Loydu becoming the newest member subsequent to a successful verification of the IACS Membership Criteria.

== Purpose ==
IACS is a non-commercial, technical collaboration association to establish, review, develop, and promote minimum technical requirements in relation to the design, construction, maintenance and survey of ships and other marine related facilities and to assist international regulatory bodies in the development and interpretation of statutory regulations to help ensure their universal and uniform application, with a view to improving safety at sea and marine environmental protection.

Although IACS is a non-governmental organization, it also plays a role within the International Maritime Organization (IMO), for which IACS provides technical support and guidance and develops unified interpretations of the international statutory regulations developed by the member states of the IMO. Once adopted, these interpretations are applied by each IACS member society, when certifying compliance with the statutory regulations on behalf of authorizing flag states.

IACS has consultative status with the IMO and remains the only non-governmental organization with observer status which also develops and applies technical rules that are reflective of the aims embodied within IMO conventions. The link between the international maritime regulations, developed by the IMO and the classification rule requirements for a ship's hull structure and essential engineering systems is codified in the International Convention for the Safety of Life at Sea (SOLAS).

== Organization ==
IACS operates through the following bodies: Council, Chair's Office, Sub-Committee (on Quality Policy), General Policy Group (GPG), Quality Committee (QC), Panels, Expert Groups (EGs), Small Groups (SGs), Project Teams (PTs) and the Permanent Secretariat including the Quality System Certification Scheme (QSCS) Operations Centre. The Council is the governing body of the Association, with each member represented on the Council by a senior management executive. The Chairman of the Council is elected from among the IACS Members for a term of two years. Reporting to the Council is the General Policy Group (GPG), made up of a senior management representative from each member society. The GPG develops and implements actions giving effect to the policies, directions, and long-term plans of the Council and provide advice to the Council as necessary on issues in the maritime field, and initiate action in areas of strategic importance to the Association. The technical work of IACS (i.e. development of IACS Resolutions/Recommendations) is undertaken by several Working Groups (WGs) which comprise seven panels (a permanent WG related to specific areas of the technical work) and nine EGs (a non-permanent WG to advise on a specialised area of IACS' work), the members of which are drawn from the technical, engineering, survey or quality management staff of the member societies.

== Duty and responsibility of members ==
There are more than 50 organizations worldwide that define their activities as providing marine classification. Those classification societies that meet the conditions of membership may apply for membership of IACS. To remain a member, all members are required to demonstrate continued compliance with quality standards as determined by periodic audits conducted by Independent Accredited Certification Bodies (ACBs).

To promote maritime safety and clean seas, IACS and its individuals carry out research and development on marine-related topics, providing technical support and verifying compliance with published standards.

The classification process begins with the evaluation by the classification society of a submitted design to determine its compliance with the rules. During construction, classification society surveyors attend the vessel to verify that it is built in conformance with the drawings and to the rules. On delivery, the vessel will receive periodic surveys by the society to verify that it is being maintained to the required standard. These surveys generally follow a five-year cycle of annual, intermediate, and special surveys with the extent of the survey varying depending upon the age of the vessel or offshore unit and the type of survey being conducted.

For a vessel to remain "in class" it must meet the class rule requirements at the completion of each survey. Should a vessel sustain in-service damage, the vessel's owner advises the classification society of record so that a damage survey can be arranged. If the surveyor decides that the damaged vessel no longer meets the rules, the owner must carry out repairs to bring the vessel back into compliance if it is to remain in the class.

== Membership ==
As of February 2024, the members of IACS are:

Name	Abbreviation	Formed	Head office
American Bureau of Shipping	ABS	1862	Houston
Bureau Veritas	BV	1828	Paris
Croatian Register of Shipping	CRS	1949	Split
China Classification Society	CCS	1956	Beijing
DNV	DNV	1864	Oslo
Indian Register of Shipping	IRClass	1975	Mumbai
Lloyd's Register	LR	1760	London
Korean Register of Shipping	KR	1960	Busan
Nippon Kaiji Kyokai	ClassNK	1899	Tokyo
Polish Register of Shipping	PRS	1936	Gdańsk
Registro Italiano Navale	RINA	1861	Genoa
Türk Loydu	TL	1962	Istanbul
