= RS Mistral =

German container ship

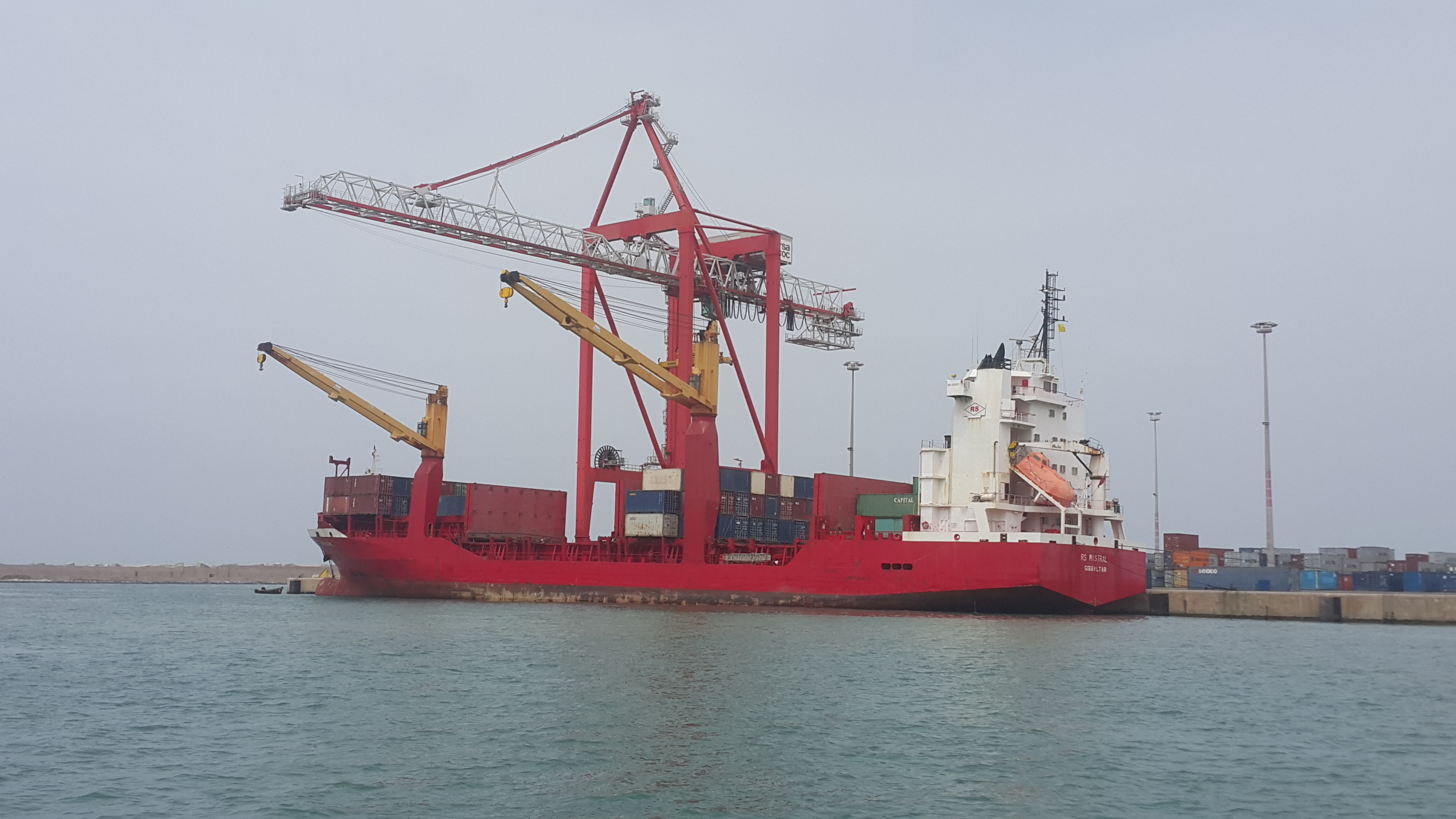
- Motor Vessel RS Mistral

History

Gibraltar
- Name: 2018–present: RS Mistral; 2014–2018: Reykjafoss
- Owner: Romy Shipping AS (186197) (IMO number: 1795096)
- Operator: Myklebusthaug Management AS (10008902)
- Port of registry: Gibraltar
- Route: Maersk Line Z42 Malta - Durrës Empties
- Identification: IMO number: 9202077; MMSI number: 236648000; Callsign: ZDNY3
- Status: In active service

Antigua and Barbuda
- Name: 1999–2000, 2001-2003 Westersingel, 2000–2001 X-Press Italia, 2003–2004 MSC Bosphorus, 2004–2005 Western 2005–2014 Reykjafoss
- Owner: CV Scheepvaartonderneming Westersingel
- Port of registry: Antigua and Barbuda
- Builder: Schiffswerft und Maschinenfabrik Cassens GmbH (Hull number: 30221)
- Laid down: 8 June 1998
- Launched: 24 April 1999
- Completed: 11 June 1999
- Identification: IMO number: 9202077

General characteristics
- Class & type: 100 A5 E General cargo ship with double hull Equipped for carriage of containers SOLAS-II-2, Reg.19 MC E AUT
- Tonnage: 7,541 GT; 8,430 tonnes deadweight (DWT),
- Length: 127 m (416.7 ft)
- Beam: 20.4 m (66.9 ft)
- Draft: 7.7 m (25.3 ft)
- Depth: 10.35 m (34.0 ft)
- Installed power: MAK 8 M552 C 6000kW-8160 bhp
- Speed: 16.5 kts on 24 t IFO 380 cst, max wind/sea B2
- Capacity: 712 twenty-foot equivalent units (TEU). 245 in hold, 467 on deck

RS Mistral is a container ship owned by Romy Shipping and operated by AS Myklebusthaug Management AS. The 127-metre (417 ft) long ship was built at Schiffswerft und Maschinenfabrik Cassens GmbH in Emden, Germany in 1999 as Westersingel. Originally owned by CV Scheepvaartonderneming Westersingel, she has had three owners, been registered under three flags, and been renamed eight times.

== Construction ==
Then named Westersingel, the ship's keel was laid on 8 June 1998 at Schiffswerft und Maschinenfabrik Cassens GmbH in Emden, Germany. Its hull has an overall length of 127 metres (417 ft). In terms of width, the ship has a beam of 20.4 metres (67 ft). The height from the top of the keel to the main deck, called the moulded depth, is 10.35 metres (34.0 ft).

The ship's container-carrying capacity of 712 twenty-foot equivalent units (TEU) (712 20-foot shipping containers) places it in the range of a small feeder ship. The ship's gross tonnage, a measure of the volume of all its enclosed spaces, is 7,541. Its net tonnage, which measures the volume of the cargo spaces, is 3,432. Its total carrying capacity in terms of weight, is 8,430 long tons deadweight (DWT).

The vessel was built with a MAK 8 M552 C 6000 kW-8160 bhp main engine which drives a controllable-pitch propeller. The ship also features 2 600-kilowatt (800 hp) Caterpillar 3512 DITA auxiliary generators, backed-up by a 96 kW emergency diesel generator.

RS Mistral has two port-side cargo cranes. Ships with cranes, known as geared ships, are more flexible in that they can visit ports that are not equipped with pierside cranes. However, having cranes on board also has drawbacks. This added flexibility incurs some costs greater recurring expenses, such as maintenance and fuel costs. The United Nations Council on Trade and Development characterizes geared ships as a "niche market only appropriate for those ports where low cargo volumes do not justify investment in port cranes or where the public sector does not have the financial resources for such investment."

Construction of the ship was completed in 1999. As of 2018, the ship is classified by Det Norske Veritas with the code "100 A5 E General cargo ship with double hull Equipped for carriage of containers SOLAS-II-2, Reg.19", meaning that it was constructed under the supervision of a recognized classification society, that the construction complies with the society's rules, that it is classed as a general cargo carrier and container ship, and that it is designed to be operated with unattended machinery spaces.

== Current Service ==
As of November 2018, RS Mistral runs the Maersk Line Z42 Malta - Durrës Empties service. Every 5 days, the vessel makes the round trip between Marsaxlokk, Malta, and Durrës, Albania, taking 2 days between Malta and Albania, and 3 days from Albania to Malta.
