= Eastern Venus =

Cruise ship, built 1998

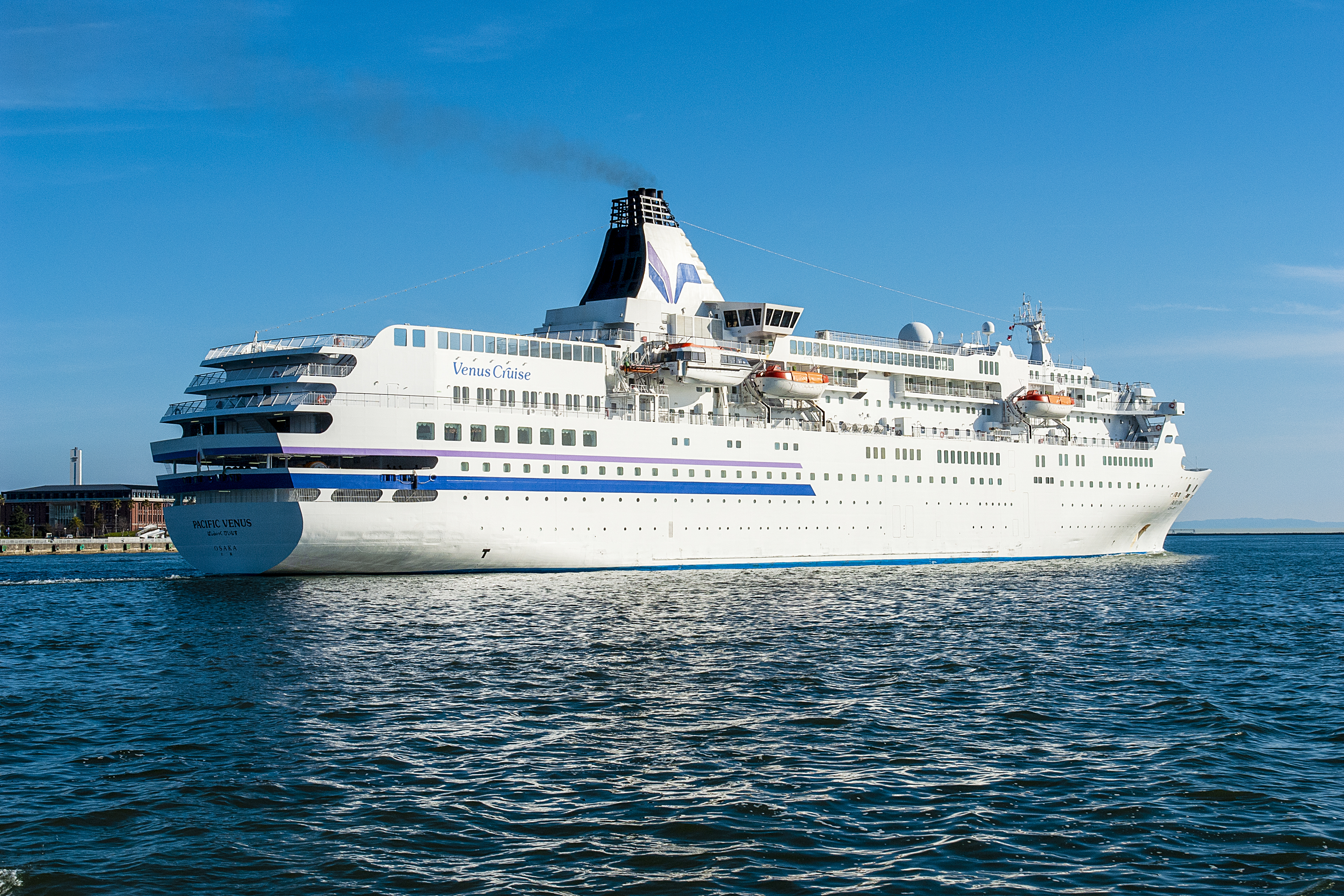
- The now Eastern Venus in Kobe, 2016

History

Panama
- Name: Eastern Venus
- Owner: Eastern Venus Inc.
- Operator: DuWon Shipping
- Port of registry: Colon, Panama
- Builder: Ishikawajima-Harima Heavy Industries Co., Ltd.
- Cost: $114 million
- Laid down: 16 July 1997
- Launched: 29 September 1997
- Completed: 27 March 1998
- Maiden voyage: 12 April 1998
- In service: 1998–present
- Identification: Call sign JPEI; IMO number: 9160011; MMSI number: 431281000
- Status: in service

General characteristics
- Type: Cruise ship
- Tonnage: 26,594 GT
- Length: 183.4 m (601 ft 8 in)
- Beam: 25 m (82 ft 0 in)
- Draft: 6.5 m (21 ft 4 in)
- Depth: 9 m (29 ft 6 in)
- Decks: Twelve passenger decks
- Speed: 20.8 knots (38.5 km/h; 23.9 mph)
- Capacity: 720 passengers (2024)

Eastern Venus, formerly Pacific Venus (ぱしふぃっくびいなす), is a cruise ship completed in 1998 by Ishikawajima-Harima Heavy Industries and originally owned by Japanese company Venus Cruise Line, a subsidiary of the Shin Nihonkai Ferry company. In 2023, the ship was sold to Panamanian company Eastern Venus Inc. following its owner's shutdown and subsequently renamed to Eastern Venus, with the International Register of Shipping listing the official manager and operator as DuWon Shipping, a South Korea-based company affiliated with Eastern Venus Inc.

== Description ==
Eastern Venus has a total length of 183.4 meters (601 ft 8 in) meters and a width of 25 meters (82 ft 0 in), stationarily weighing 4,202 tons and having a gross tonnage of 26,594 tons. The vessel is mainly light-colored and contains four royal suites with their respective names, two of them being the "Archaic" and "Modern" suites, following Japanese traditional architecture, with the other two, the "Noble" and "Elegant" being more modern-looking in style.

In addition to the royal suites, there are sixteen regular suites. Royal suites have several more features than the regular ones, such as larger bathroom space and a bedroom separate from the main living room. "Primavera", the name for the ship's dining room, has over 300 seats and serves both Japanese and Western food.

Eastern Venus contains five decks and has a 6.5-meter (21 ft 4 in) draft. The ship has a depth of hold of 9 meters. In 2024, the ship could hold 720 passengers, up from 696 the previous year. The ship can go over 20 knots (37 km/h; 23 mph).

== History ==
Eastern Venus was built under the name Pacific Venus in 1998 by IHI Corporation, then known as Ishikawajima-Harima Heavy Industries. Its first voyage saw the ship on a 40-day trip across East Asia sometime that same year. It was originally owned by Japan Cruise Line, under the branding name Venus Cruise Line; this cruise line was a subsidiary of the company of Shin Nihonkai Ferry. Since then, the ship sailed around Japan and went as far as Europe. On the vessel's 15-year anniversary (in January 2013), it followed the same route as it did on its first journey, this time taking 42 days.

=== Change in ownership ===
Venus Cruise Line, in early November 2022, announced it would be shutting down and closing its operations and business, and the last voyage under the company (and name Pacific Venus) would be from Kobe, Japan to Shidao, China and back within the period of 27 December 2022 to 4 January 2023. Venus Cruise Line had approximately 80 voyages with about 25,000 domestic tourists yearly before the COVID-19 pandemic struck.

The new company that the ship was sold to is the Panama-based single-ship Eastern Venus Incorporation. Later, the company was renamed to Eastern Cruise. The company is affiliated with DuWon Shipping, the ship's operator and manager based in South Korea, where homeports were set up along with some in Taiwan. Un Song Kim, Public Relations and Marketing General Manager of Eastern Cruise, predicted an estimated 5.17% growth in South Korea's cruise market every year from 2024 to 2028. With the change in ownership, the port of registry also changed, going from Osaka, Japan to Colon, Panama. The first cruise with the new cruise line took place from 24 December 2024 to 28 December 2024, from Busan, South Korea to a variety of Japanese port cities; it was a Christmas-themed cruise and also the inaugural cruise of Eastern Cruise, and so the ship was decorated with a Christmas tree among other decorations. The company plans to continue its cruises to tourist destininations in the island of Kyushu, as well as other international and domestic routes starting in April.
