= NIBULON =

Ukrainian agricultural company

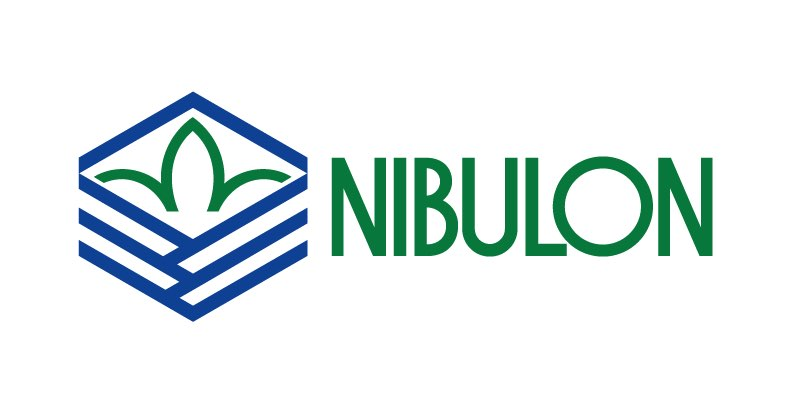
- Native name: НІБУЛОН
- Type: Private
- Industry: agriculture
- Founded: December 5, 1991
- Founder: Oleksiy Vadaturskyy
- Headquarters: Kyiv, Ukraine
- Key people: Andriy Vadaturskyi (CEO)
- Number of employees: ▼3,700 (2023); ~4,000 (2018)
- Website: www.nibulon.com

NIBULON (Ukrainian: НІБУЛОН) is a Ukrainian agricultural company specializing in production and export of grains such as wheat, barley and corn. The company was headquartered in Mykolaiv until 2023, when it transferred to Kyiv. It is the only agricultural company in Ukraine with its own fleet and shipyard.

NIBULON was founded by Oleksiy Vadaturskyy in 1991. He was awarded the Hero of Ukraine distinction in 2007 for his contributions to the development of Ukrainian agriculture. In 2022, Vadaturskyy was killed in a Russian missile attack on Mykolaiv. His son, Andriy Vadaturskyi, subsequently took over as CEO.

== History ==
=== 1991–2000 ===
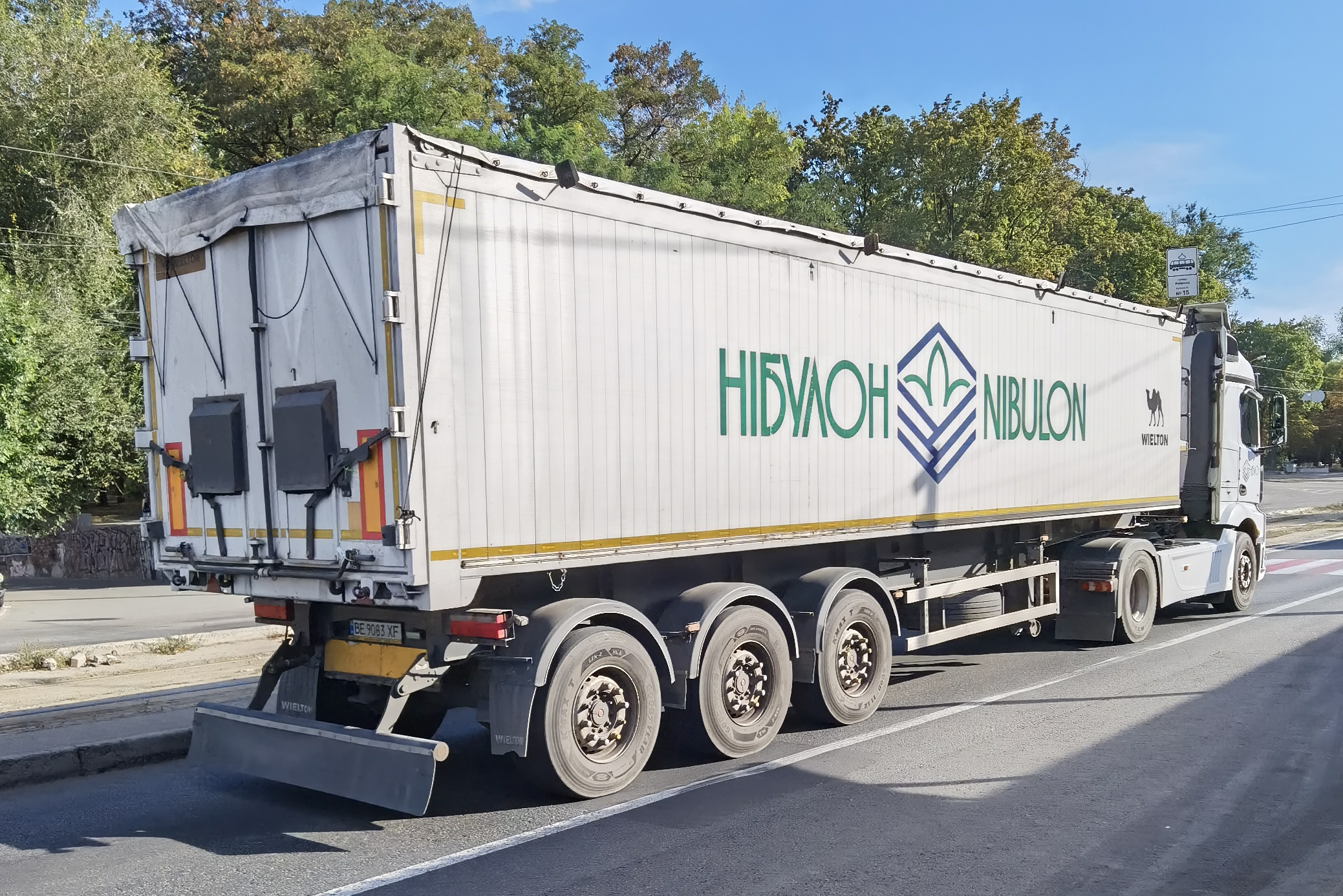
NIBULON truck

In 1991, the joint venture of the Mykolaiv businessman Oleksiy Vadaturskyy, the Hungarian and British firms KOMBISEED KFT and Meridian Commodities Ltd, were created. The name of the company was formed after the first letters of the cities where the co-founders came from: Mykolaiv, Budapest and London.

In 1998, the agricultural holding its first direct loan of US$5 million from the International Bank for Reconstruction and Development (IBRD), becoming the first Ukrainian agricultural company to receive such financing. The funds were used to expand exports. Attracting a foreign loan gave impetus to the development of the company. On 15 December 2004, World Bank report (IBRD, one of its divisions) stated that each dollar invested in a NIBULON credit line generated $4–5.

=== 2001–2012 ===
In 2003, NIBULON put into operation the facilities for direct transshipment at its transshipment terminal for grain and oilseeds shipments in Mykolaiv. In August, the company loaded the first DS Pioneer vessel in Cyprus with fodder barley at the terminal. This was the first batch of Ukrainian grain of the 2003 harvest exported to Saudi Arabia. In December, two grain elevators with a capacity of 50,000 tons each were put into operation at the terminal.

The company focused on grain exports. In 2004 and 2005, NIBULON exported 1.3 million tons of grain; in 2008 and 2009, exports exceeded 4 million tons. In terms of volume, NIBULON became the leader among Ukrainian exporters. In 2004, NIBULON's transshipment terminal was acknowledged as Ukraine's best industrial facility constructed and launched that year.

In 2007, Vadaturskyy was awarded the Hero of Ukraine, the country's highest honour, for his role in the development of the Ukrainian agricultural industry.

In 2009, the company had 36 branches in 10 regions of Ukraine and cultivated approximately 70,000 hectares (170,000 acres) of land on its own. The same year, NIBULON began developing its own river transport infrastructure on the Southern Buh and Dnipro. To this end, a shipping company was established. The company signed agreements with the Okean Shipyard for the construction of 24 non-self-propelled dry cargo vessels of mixed (river-sea) navigation for the transportation of general and bulk cargoes. The following year, a contract was signed for the construction of tugboats. By 2013, NIBULON already had a fleet of 36 vessels (including 7 tugs). Additionally, the company had seven river transshipment complexes, six located on the Dnipro.

In 2012, Vadaturskyy and the European Bank for Reconstruction and Development (EBRD) Country Director for Ukraine André Küüsvek signed a loan agreement for allocation of a syndicated loan of $125 million to NIBULON.

=== 2013–2021 ===
In 2013, at the Santierul Naval Constanta Shipyard in Constanta, Romania, a solemn ceremony of the St. Mykolai floating crane christening was held. The vessel was built by the order of NIBULON, and it was the largest floating transshipment crane in the Black Sea and the Mediterranean Basins.

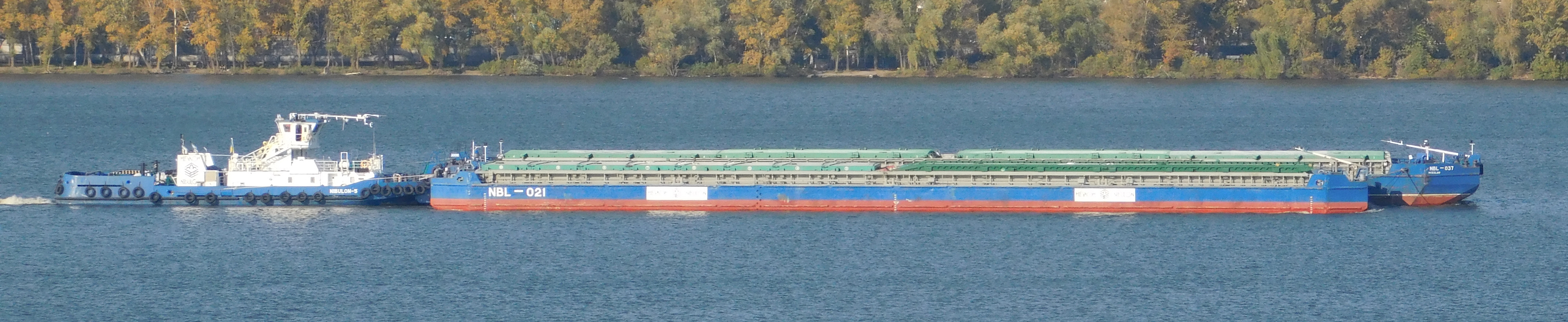
A NIBULON-5 barge on the Dnipro

In December 2013, NIBULON started to construct its own fleet, namely POSS-115 project tugs (NIBULON-5 and NIBULON-6) at its own shipbuilding yard. NIBULON planned to increase the volume of river freight to 1 million tons.

In 2016, the company prepared for the resumption of passenger transportation on the Dnipro and the Southern Buh. By November, it repaired and tested two Voskhod hydrofoils (NIBULON Express-1, NIBULON Express-2). That same year the NIBULON Express performed its first trip. In December 2016, the European Investment Bank and NIBULON signed a €71 million loan agreement to develop and modernize the logistics infrastructure of Ukraine. In 2017, NIBULON launched scheduled passenger transportation by the routes Voznesensk – Kovalivka – Nova Odesa – Mykolaiv and Nova Kakhovka – Kherson – Hola Prystan, as well as trips to the Kinburn Spit.

In 2017, the company inaugurated its Khortytsia branch in Bilenke, Zaporizhzhia Oblast, with the participation of the Ukrainian Prime Minister Volodymyr Groysman. During the inauguration, NIBULON signed a $100 million loan agreement with the International Finance Corporation to boost food security. That year, the company announced that it expanded its logistical capabilities after acquiring 60 new tractors.

In 2018 it was announced that the company was involved in a construction project of new deep water seaport in Kherson Oblast, Dnieper-Buh Estuary. In 2018, the EBRD and NIBULON signed a $50 million loan agreement to continue the implementation of the national project to revive cargo transportation on the Dnipro and the Southern Buh and to develop grain logistics. On 3 March, the first 100-metre non-self-propelled B5000 project vessel was launched from the reconstructed slipway of Nibulon Shipyard. On 1 June, NIBULON started regular passenger transportation by the route Ochakiv – Kinburn Spit. To perform these trips, the company's 100-metre floating berth was installed in Ochakiv.

In 2019, NIBULON put into operation its new transshipment terminal in Ternivka, Zaporizhzhia Oblast, making it the company's third terminal in the oblast. On 20 September, NIBULON officially opened the international TRANS EXPO ODESA-MYKOLAIV 2019 Forum at the NIBULON shipbuilding and shiprepair yard. A water show with the participation of NIBULON's entire fleet series was the main event. The company officially put into operation a 140-metre NIBULON MAX river-sea floating vessel, the longest one built for the past 25 years of Ukraine's independence. It is equipped with two cranes and grain storage of 13,400 m^{3} (470,000 cu ft).

In 2020, NIBULON put into operation its new high-tech Zelenodolska branch transshipment terminal in Marianske, Dnipropetrovsk Oblast, making it the company's first facility in the region.

On July 1, 2021, a new facility with the organizational and legal form of a limited liability company was established on the basis of the company's structural division, the NIBULON shipbuilding and shiprepair yard.

=== 2022–present ===
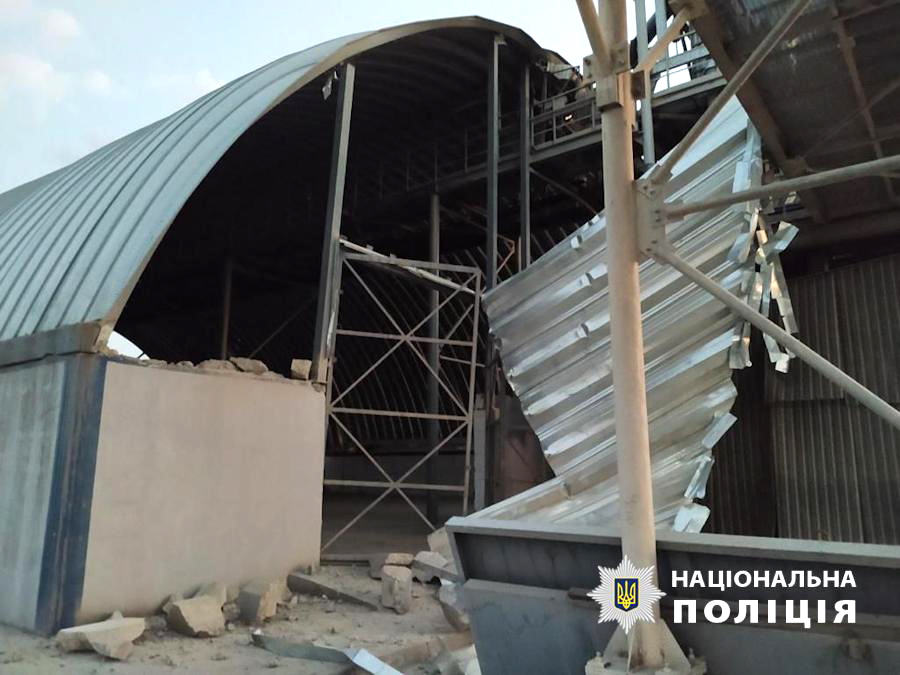
A NIBULON granary damaged by a Russian drone attack on Izmail in 2023

On 30 July 2022, Vadaturskyy and his wife, Raisa, were killed during a bombing of Mykolaiv, when a rocket hit the bedroom of their house. Ukrainian president Volodymyr Zelenskyy called his death "a great loss". In the wake of the bombing, Ukrainian presidential advisor Mykhailo Podolyak said Vadaturskyy was specifically targeted as one of Ukraine's wealthiest businessmen. Their son Andriy Vadaturskyy subsequently became NIBULON's new CEO.

As of 2022, NIBULON's fleet comprised 81 vessels. In June 2022, the construction of a new river transshipment terminal for its Bessarabska branch began in Izmail, with the completion of the first phase announced in October. From October 2022 to June 2023, the branch exported the first million tons of grain cargo. During the blockade of Black Sea ports by the Russian navy, the branch became the main channel of the company's exports. In the first quarter of 2023, 64% of grain was exported through the Izmail terminal. In 2023, most of the NIBULON fleet was blockaded in the Mykolaiv port by Russian naval vessels.

== Areas of activity ==
The company has 50 facilities and divisions located in 14 regions of Ukraine and 3 filling stations.

=== Trade ===
The company holds a significant share in Ukraine's exports of most grain and oilseeds (wheat, corn, barley, sunflower, soybeans, rapeseed, and sorghum), which are Ukraine's specialties. According to the results of the 2021 calendar year, NIBULON shipped a record 5.64 million tons. The company's main trading activity is focused on wheat, corn, barley, and sorghum, the majority of which is exported to the European Union, the Middle East, North Africa, and Southeast Asia.

On 6 December 2017, the Food and Agriculture Organization (FAO) and NIBULON signed a memorandum of understanding to focus on improving the efficiency of Egyptian companies involved in grain production, storage, and transportation.

=== Logistics ===
NIBULON redirects its cargo flows to water transport. To this end, the shipping company has been operating since 2009. It transports cargoes along the Dnipro and the Southern Buh. The company's modern fleet efficiently transports grain, watermelons and melons, metal, building materials (sand, piles, etc.), coal, and oversize cargoes. NIBULON's shipping company transported more than 25 million tons of cargoes by Ukrainian rivers, removing the equivalent of more than 1 million trucks from Ukrainian highways. During the 2020 fiscal year, NIBULON transported about 4.3 million tons of various products, which represented a new yearly record for cargoes transported by Ukrainian inland waterways.

The company's cargo fleet is the youngest in Ukraine and is composed entirely of Ukrainian vessels. It consists of 83 units: tugboats, non-self-propelled vessels, Mykolaivets self-propelled dredger, NIBULON MAX self-propelled floating crane (P-140 project), St. Mykolai self-propelled floating crane, Nibulonivets and Nibulonivets-2 non-self-propelled floating cranes, and NIBULON Express hydrofoils.

The company also has its own wagon fleet and truck fleet. The wagon fleet consists of 3 locomotives and 212 hopper wagons. In 2019, NIBULON purchased 108 hopper wagons to transport grain 19-6869 produced by KARPATY Experimental Mechanical Plant. In 2021, the company purchased 54 wagons. In 2023, the United States Agency for International Development (USAID) Economic Resilience Activity purchased 50 new hopper wagons for NIBULON. In 2017, the truck fleet was expanded through the purchase of 60 new Volvo, Mercedes-Benz, and Scania AB trucks. In 2024, the company began updating its truck fleet by acquiring 76 Scania R450 Euro 5 trucks and 64 STAS semi-trailers.

In 2018 and 2019, the company built three filling stations to serve its own needs in Kremenchuk, Svatove, and Khmilnyk.

After the Russian invasion of Ukraine began in 2022, unable to use the Dnipro and the Southern Buh, NIBULON relocated some of its vessels to the Danube.

=== Elevators ===
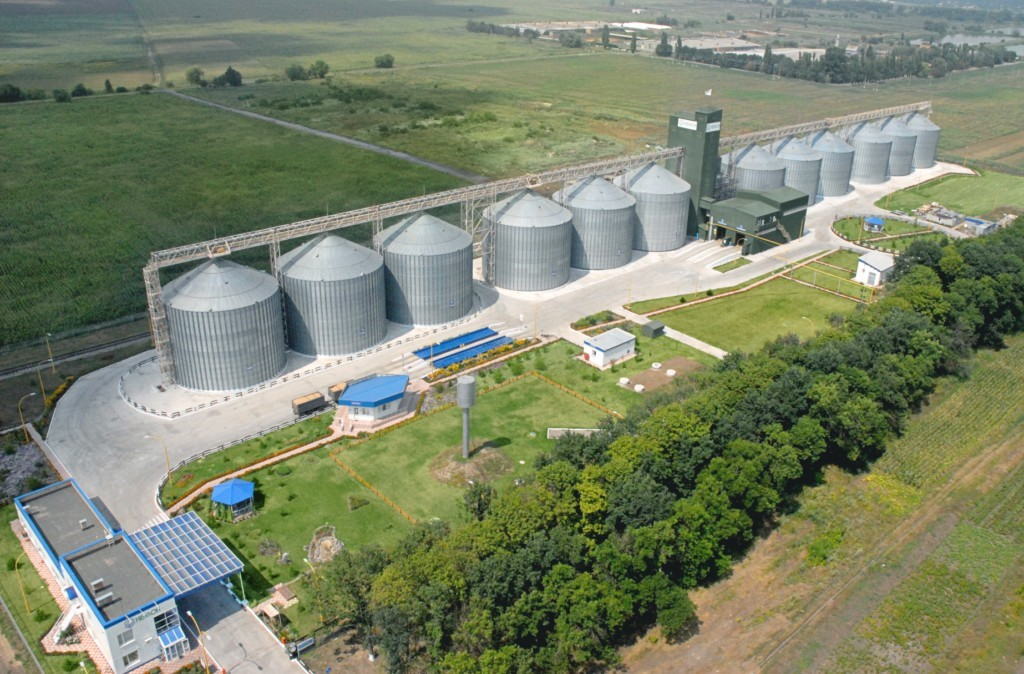
NIBULON grain elevators

Over the years, NIBULON has created a unique grain logistics infrastructure in Ukraine, consisting of transshipment terminals and complexes for grain and oilseeds receipt, storage and shipment, a high-capacity fleet, and production branches throughout Ukraine. The facilities are located in the areas of large grain production to reduce the distance to transport agricultural commodities from fields to elevators.

The total elevator capacity is 2.04 million tons. The capacity of each facility is the following: 5–7.5 thousand tons per day in receipts from road transport; 2-3 thousand tons per day in drying volumes; 4-8 thousand tons per day in water transportation shipments; 4 thousand tons per day in rail transport shipments; and 56,000 thousand tons per day for the total capacity of the company's facilities for drying corn.

In 2009, NIBULON started implementing its investmentment project to revive the Dnipro and the Southern Buh as transport waterways of Ukraine. As part of the project, the company has built 18 elevator complexes and transshipment terminals across Ukraine. At present, the company's network consists of 27 transshipment terminals and complexes for grain and oilseeds receipt, storage and shipment.

The main transshipment terminal for grain and oilseeds shipments in Mykolaiv is unique not only in Ukraine but also in Europe. The transshipment terminal was acknowledged as Ukraine's best industrial facility constructed and put into operation in 2004. In June 2008, the team headed by Oleksiy Vadaturskyy received the State Prize of Ukraine in the Field of Architecture under the Ukraine President's Decree No. 569/2008. The terminal has modern complexes to receive, ship, dry, and treat grain, plus a warehouse of floor storage with active ventilation and a capacity of 8,000 tons. NIBULON can also receive different quality agricultural commodities and improve them to export standards.

=== Agricultural production ===
==== Crop production ====
NIBULON cultivates more than 76,000 hectares (190,000 acres) of agricultural land. At present, four clusters in six regions of Ukraine are involved in agricultural production. In 2021, a gross harvest comprised 334,000 tons. The highlights of the 2021 season were a record yield of winter crops of 46.2 dt/ha and the best sunflower yield of 51,100 tons.

In 2018, NIBULON's agricultural machinery fleet received almost one hundred units of new machinery, including 22 Belarusian Minsk Tractor Works 952.3 tractors, 10 new John Deere and Case IH harvesters, 6 Tiger-Mate II cultivators, 3 Kinze 3000 seeding machines, 10 Fendt 1038 VARIO tractors, one Lemken Rubin 9-600 disc harrow, two Lemken Rubin 10S800 disc harrows, and other machines. The agricultural machinery fleet at that time comprised 1,550 units. In 2024, NIBULON invested up to $20 million to purchase modern agricultural machinery from multiple companies, including CLAAS, HORSHCH, HARDI, and BEDNAR.

==== Livestock farming ====
The company is engaged in livestock farming with four dairy farms and one pig farm located in three regions of Ukraine. The branches farm the following breeds of cattle: Ukrainian black-spotted dairy, Ukrainian red-spotted dairy, Holstein Friesian, Angler, and Simmental.

NIBULON was also engaged in producing meat and sausage at its production facilities in Bystryk, Zhytomyr Oblast, under NIBULON's “Bystrytski Kovbasy” trademark. The products were produced by using traditional recipes and used natural raw materials, without adding soya or synthetic aromatizers.

=== Shipbuilding ===
NIBULON shipbuilding and shiprepair yard LLC is located in protected water area of the Southern Buh River, near NIBULON's transshipment terminal, in the area of the first canal bend of Mykolaiv Sea Port waters. The shipyard builds complete vessels and floating facilities. The complete production cycle is performed by the shipyard's specialists—from metal cutting to furniture production, insulation and painting, commissioning of electrical and automation equipment, piping works, hull works, mechanical and fitter works, and engineering support. The shipyard also performs ship repairs and design works. NIBULON shipbuilding and shiprepair yard works are under the supervision of, and its operations meet the requirements of, the Shipping Register of Ukraine. Due to modernization, the shipyard launches 6-10 vessels per year. Presently, 700 qualified specialists work at the shipyard.

The NIBULON MAX 140-m self-propelled river-sea floating vessel is the largest crane vessel built since Ukraine's independence.

In November 2021, NIBULON shipbuilding and shiprepair yard and OCEA officially signed an agreement to build 5 OCEA FPB 98 MKI fast patrol boats as part of the government project to strengthen Ukraine's maritime safety and security.

=== Passenger transportation ===
In 2017, NIBULON launched passenger transportation by water as its social project. The company manufactured and installed floating pontoon berths on the Kinburn Spit, as well as in Mykolaiv and Ochakiv. The most popular route in all seasons is Mykolaiv–Kinburn Spit–Ochakiv. The season for passenger transportation by water is from spring to autumn. The company informs about the opening and closing dates of the season in advance on its official website and on its Facebook page titled "Passenger Transportation by Water".

In 2021, NIBULON completed its fifth season of passenger transportation by water. The company transported more than 22,000 passengers in 2021. In five years, NIBULON's fleet transported more than 120,000 passengers.

During the summers of 2022 and 2023, NIBULON provided passenger transportation along the route Bilhorod–Dnistrovskyi–Ovidiopol.

=== Demining ===
As a result of the Russian invasion of Ukraine, 30% of NIBULON's land bank, which consists of land plots leased by individuals, has been mined. In spring 2023, NIBULON became a mine action operator and received its first certificate to conduct non-technical surveys. The company's deminers started a non-technical survey at the Snihurivska branch to return the land bank in Mykolaiv Oblast to economic use. In March 2024, NIBULON was certified to carry out technical survey, manual demining, and combat area clearance. In May 2024, it successfully gained certification in demining with the use of machines and mechanisms.

NIBULON received grant funding from DEG Impulse gGmbH and purchased four GCS-200 demining machines and a Volkswagen Crafter type B ambulance.

== Sustainable development ==
=== Minimizing the impact on the environment ===
During FY 2018, NIBULON invested UAH 68.7 million in environmental and ecological efforts. In 2009, NIBULON started to redirect its cargoes to water transport. NIBULON has transported over 25 million tons of cargo by inland waterways, thereby removing more than 1 million trucks from highways and contributing to the reduction of harmful emissions. Rail transportation plays a significant role in the logistics structure, allowing the company to minimize transportation by road.

NIBULON implements its own environmental standards. It installs equipment to minimize the impact of its production processes on the environment. Since 2017, it has been implementing its energy saving program and waste recycling program for waste created at the company's subdivisions. Within the above-mentioned program, the company installed boilers running on waste oils to heat and ensure hot water supply of the transport department; NIBULON installed solid fuel boilers running on briquettes made from non-feed grain waste at other subdivisions.

Considering that NIBULON is engaged in agricultural activities, its facilities are located in the villages. Thus, the return water discharge infrastructure is absent at the branches. Consequently, the branches have local sewage systems equipped with water treatment facilities. NIBULON uses European technology to clean domestic sewage water by performing complete biological cleaning with a membrane ultrafiltration method. Rainwater, melt water, and wash water are gathered and cleansed of oil products. The quality of treatment means that the company can discharge treated return water into the pond or use it for technical needs (irrigation, road cleaning, etc.)

The company's modern fleet meets the requirements of the International Convention for the Prevention of Pollution from Ships (Marpol 73/78), which is confirmed by the international certificates issued by the Shipping Register of Ukraine. Since 2017, NIBULON has equipped its floating facilities with devices to treat washing water with a system for its reuse.

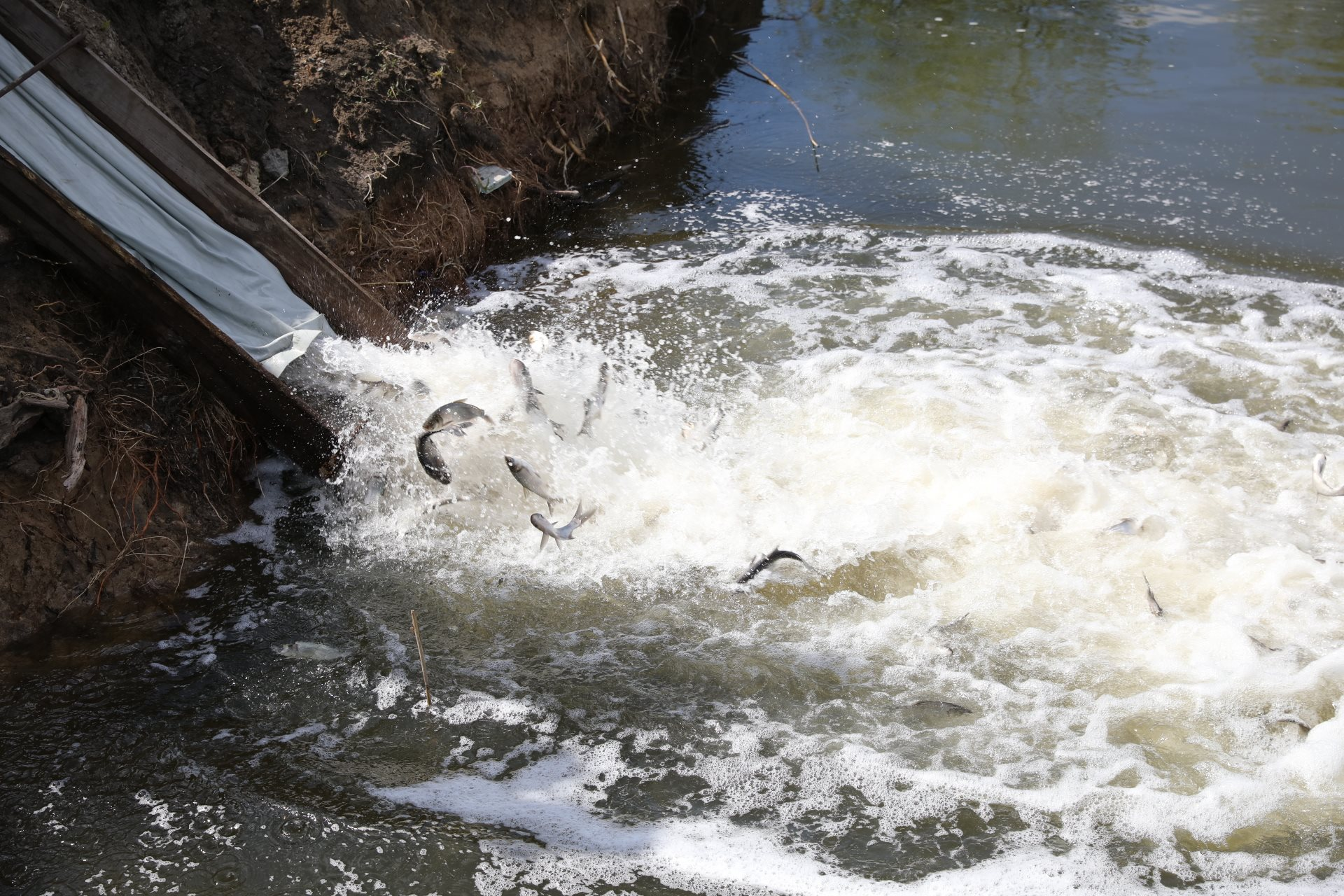
Stocking the Ploska Osokorivka at Ternivka

NIBULON constantly stocks the rivers with fish and plants trees and bushes at its sites. The company stocked the Dnipro, the Southern Buh, as well as the Kakhovka Reservoir, the Kaniv Reservoir, the Kremenchuk Reservoir and the Dnipro Reservoir, with fish as part of compensatory measures, having released about 70 tons of silver carp, grass carp and carp, with a total worth over UAH 3 million. NIBULON planted about 30 thousand of trees and bushes, worth more than UAH 1.3 million.

In August 2018, NIBULON participated in the rescue operation and saved tens of thousands of so-iuy mullet in the Molochnyi Estuary (Zaporizhzhia Oblast). The fish entered the estuary in spring for spawning. It stuck in shallow water and died for lack of sea water. To rescue so-iuy mullet, NIBULON's dredger removed about 10,000 m3 of sand.

In May 2018, the EBRD recognized NIBULON as the bronze award winner in the category “Environmental and Social Innovation” with an investment program for expanding and modernizing grain logistics infrastructure by further development of grain transportation by inland waterways.

=== Hunger overcoming ===
NIBULON exports agricultural commodities to 75 countries. It also participates in the World Food Programme, a world hunger relief effort operated by the United Nations, exporting grains to and supporting agricultural development in Pakistan, Ethiopia, Bangladesh, Kenya, Mauritania, Yemen, and other countries.

=== Responsible agricultural production ===
NIBULON's agronomists take into account the peculiarities of the crops grown and the suitability of soil and climate zones during planting, to maximize their potential. NIBULON's laboratories can measure soil fertility, thereby enabling the company to improve the application of fertilizers and pesticides, to conduct planned crop rotation and to timely adapt agrarian techniques. The company manages to reduce the use of mineral fertilizers, in particular, thanks to strip-till, which involves preserving all nutrient residues on the surface for soil mineralization, especially in sandy soils.

NIBULON uses both traditional soil cultivation methods and sowing with grain drills, as well as implements strip-till technology. Strip-till not only helps ensure high precision and efficiency in technological operations but also reduces fuel consumption, limits soil moisture evaporation, and prevents wind erosion. For the effective implementation of the new practice, NIBULON began updating its agricultural machinery fleet in 2024.

=== Care for communities in the circle of influence ===
For many years, NIBULON has been signing social partnership agreements with town, village and settlement councils, totaling approximately 80 agreements with localities in 13 regions of Ukraine. The purpose of these agreements was to implement social and economic development programs, preserve and enrich the traditions of historical and cultural heritage, and maintain infrastructure. NIBULON sponsored repairs and equipment of schools, medical institutions and palaces of culture, winterization of kindergartens, repair of roads, renewal of street lighting, heat-, water-, gas-supply. NIBULON also invests in road repairs and assists educational and medical institutions.

In Bilenke, Zaporizhzhia Oblast, NIBULON opened sewage treatment facilities with a capacity of 2,000 m^{3} (71,000 cu ft) per day, built and reconstructed at the company's expense.

To fight the COVID-19 pandemic, NIBULON donated UAH 100 million to develop the healthcare sector in Ukraine. As a result, the company installed 4 oxygen stations supplying 100 cubic meters per hour, laid oxygen networks with 400 oxygen supply points, created 50 first-class wards with 100 beds, as well as installed communication systems and call buttons. NIBULON also organized a modern laboratory to carry out analyses for the presence or absence of coronavirus by using the Polymerase chain reaction PCR method on the basis of Mykolaiv Regional Laboratory Center of the Ministry of Healthcare of Ukraine by giving its own equipment.

==== Volunteering ====
The volunteer movements of the company encompass assistance to the military, aid to local communities through participation in the reconstruction or renewal of assets affected by military actions, as well as support for volunteer initiatives of its employees.

In 2023, NIBULON's team headed by Andriy Vadaturskyy participated in the 30th Chestnut Run. The company's employees, along with other Ukrainians, participated in the event to help children. All funds collected during registration were directed to the Center for Pediatric Cardiology and Cardiac Surgery of the Ministry of Health of Ukraine.

At the end of 2023, NIBULON's employees united to create a festive atmosphere for the children under the care of the Community Unity charity fund. The employees collected warm clothing, blankets, bedding, as well as healthy sweets, toys, and greeting cards for the children.

== Recognition ==
- Multiple winner of the National Maritime Rating of Ukraine.
- In 2019, NIBULON became the Best Employer in Mykolaiv.
- NIBULON was acknowledged as “Ukraine’s Most Attractive Employer in Agriculture” two years in a row (2019, 2020) by the Randstad Employer Brand Research.
- Multiple winner of the All-Ukrainian “Conscientious Taxpayers" rating.
- Winner of the National Competition “Charitable Ukraine” (2015, 2017, 2020), and Mykolaiv Regional Charity competition (2019).
- EBRD recognized NIBULON as the bronze award winner in the category “Environmental and Social Innovation”.
