= Andriy Vadaturskyi =

Ukrainian politician (born 1973)

Andriy Vadaturskyy
- Андрій Вадатурський
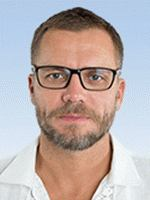
- Born: April 11, 1973 (age 53); Trykratne, Voznesensk Raion, Mykolaiv Oblast, Ukrainian SSR, USSR
- Occupation: Owner of agricultural company nibulon
- Spouse: Svitlana Dyachenko

Andriy Oleksiyovych Vadaturskyy (Ukrainian: Андрій Олексійович Вадатурський; April 11, 1973) is a Ukrainian businessman, people's deputy of the Verkhovna Rada of Ukraine of the 8th convocation, and CEO of Nibulon.

== Biography ==
Andriy was born in a family of Oleksiy Vadaturskyy, a businessman, founder of NIBULON.

His father Oleksiy Opanasovych Vadaturskyy (1947–2022) is a Hero of Ukraine.

Vadaturskyy's mother, Raisa Mykhailivna (1949–2022). His parents were killed by Russian missile. The Office of the President of Ukraine stated that this was an intentional murder, one of the acts of Russian terrorism in Ukraine.

Andriy Vadaturskyy is married and has three children.

== Education ==
Andriy holds an MS in Electrical Engineering from the Ukrainian State Maritime Technical University and an MS in Industrial Economics from the London School of Economics.

== Career ==
From 1997 to 2000, Andriy worked as the commercial department manager at NIBULON (while also balancing work with studying at the London School of Economics).

From 2001 to 2003, he headed the trading department at NIBULON.

From 2003 to 2014, Andriy served as the Deputy general manager for Trade at NIBULON.

From 2014 to 2019, he was a Member of Ukraine's National Parliament (8th convocation).

Since 2019, he chaired NIBULON's supervisory board.

Since 2022, Andriy Vadaturskyy is NIBULON's CEO.

== Political activity ==
On September 25, 2014, at the constituent congress of the party organization before the extraordinary parliamentary elections, he headed the Mykolaiv territorial organization of the party "Block of Petro Poroshenko". He headed the party list in the 2014 elections to the Mykolaiv Regional Council.

In the parliamentary elections of 2014, he won in electoral district No. 130 of the Mykolaiv region with the result of 26,539 votes, which was 43.75%.

In June 2016, he left the political party "Block of Petro Poroshenko" of his own accord.

In the Verkhovna Rada of Ukraine of the 8th convocation, he is a member of the parliamentary faction of the Petro Poroshenko Bloc party, a member of the Committee of the Verkhovna Rada of Ukraine on Agrarian Policy and Land Relations.

Attendance at plenary meetings by Andriy Vadaturskyy was 82%, attendance at committee meetings was 86%, attendance during voting at plenary meetings was 94%.

Andriy Vadaturskyy took first place among people's deputies of the 8th convocation in the rating of the analytical portal "Word and Deed", having fulfilled all 45 publicly made promises to voters.

During his four and a half years of office, he processed 4,426 appeals from citizens, held 344 meetings with voters in the majority district No. 130, and attracted more than UAH 200 million for the implementation of social and economic projects.

In June 2016, Andriy Vadaturskyy publicly announced his withdrawal from the political party "Block of Petro Poroshenko". On voluntary exit. After all, he "did not agree with local politics"... The problems of his native Mykolaiv Oblast were more important to him than a specific party.

== Legislative activity ==
During his tenure as a People's Deputy, he submitted 54 requests, participated in the development and registered 120 draft laws, 17 of which became valid acts.

He initiated the creation of the Road Fund, the introduction of automatic weight control on roads and quality control of road works, advocated the revival of inland waterways of Ukraine, the development of Ukrainian shipping and shipbuilding.

He was the initiator of legislative simplifications regarding the wholesale trade of craft wine (made from own wine material), aimed at the development of Ukrainian craft winemaking.

== Financing of art projects ==
In 2016, for the first time, he organized an artistic plein air on the Kinburn spit, in which leading Ukrainian artists took part. The paintings were presented to the public at the art exhibition "Kinburn — my love" on November 25, 2016, in the Mykolaiv Regional Art Museum named after V. V. Vereshchagin.

The continuation of the project was the 2017 art plein air, during which artists from Mykolaiv, Kyiv and Zaporizhzhia created their works at four industrial enterprises of the region: South Ukrainian NPP, Sea Trade Port, Mykolaiv Alumina Plant and Mykolaiv Shipyard). Already in December 2017, 15 plein-air paintings were presented at the "Mykolaiv Art-Prom" exhibition dedicated to the promotion of Mykolaiv as a modern industrial city.

In the spring of the same year, Andriy Vadaturskyy initiated and organized the Mykolaiv art plein air "Golden Bug", the result of which was the exhibition "The Best City in the World". The works of nine talented artists from different parts of Ukraine reflect the magical beauty and grandeur of the city of ships, its special atmosphere.

In autumn 2018, the exhibition "Golden Bug 2018" dedicated to the City Day opened in Mykolaiv. It featured more than 90 paintings created by twelve Ukrainian artists during the art plein air, which took place in May. The goal of the project is to popularize Mykolaiv as a modern industrial Ukrainian city developing in various industries.

In the spring of 2018, Andriy Vadaturskyy joined the organization of the Mykolaiv half-marathon "Your time of victory", in which he personally participated.

== Recognition ==
In 2009, Andriy was awarded the title "Honoured Worker of Agriculture" by the President of Ukraine for his significant contribution to the development of Ukraine's agro-industrial complex.

== See also ==
- Nibulon Shipyard
