= Hellenic Register of Shipping =

Hellenic Register of Shipping (HRS) Ελληνικός Νηογνώμων
- Type: Non-governmental International Organization
- Industry: Maritime and Shipping
- Genre: Classification Society
- Founded: 1919
- Headquarters: Akti Miaouli 23, Piraeus, Greece
- Number of locations: 19 offices in Greece, 5 in other countries
- Services: Classification; Surveys
- Number of employees: 120
- Website: www.hrs.gr

Hellenic Register of Shipping was founded in 1919 and is active in the industry inspections and certifications of facilities and equipment as well as the Certification of Management Systems. HRS is an international NGO -non-governmental International Organization-, dedicated to the safeguarding of both life and property at sea, the prevention of marine pollution and lastly the quality assurance in the industry.

The Hellenic Register of Shipping monitors about 5,500 passenger ships and issue the general protocol inspection, as well as several large yachts, which are covered by International Conventions (SOLAS, LL. MARPOL, etc.) or the European Directive 98/18, where the Greek classification society certify class, which is mandatory for ships heading for each one.

Specifically, the industry operates as either an accredited and authorized organization with public authorities or as an independent or third-party organization (in cases where the conditions for works contracts).
