= Nibulon Shipyard =

Shipbuilding yard in Ukraine

Coordinates: 46.948079°N 31.988091°E

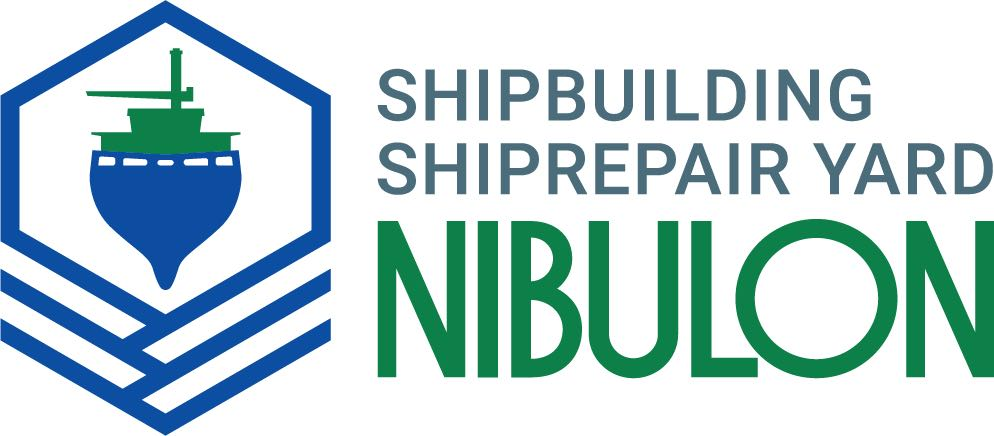
Nibulon Shipyard logo

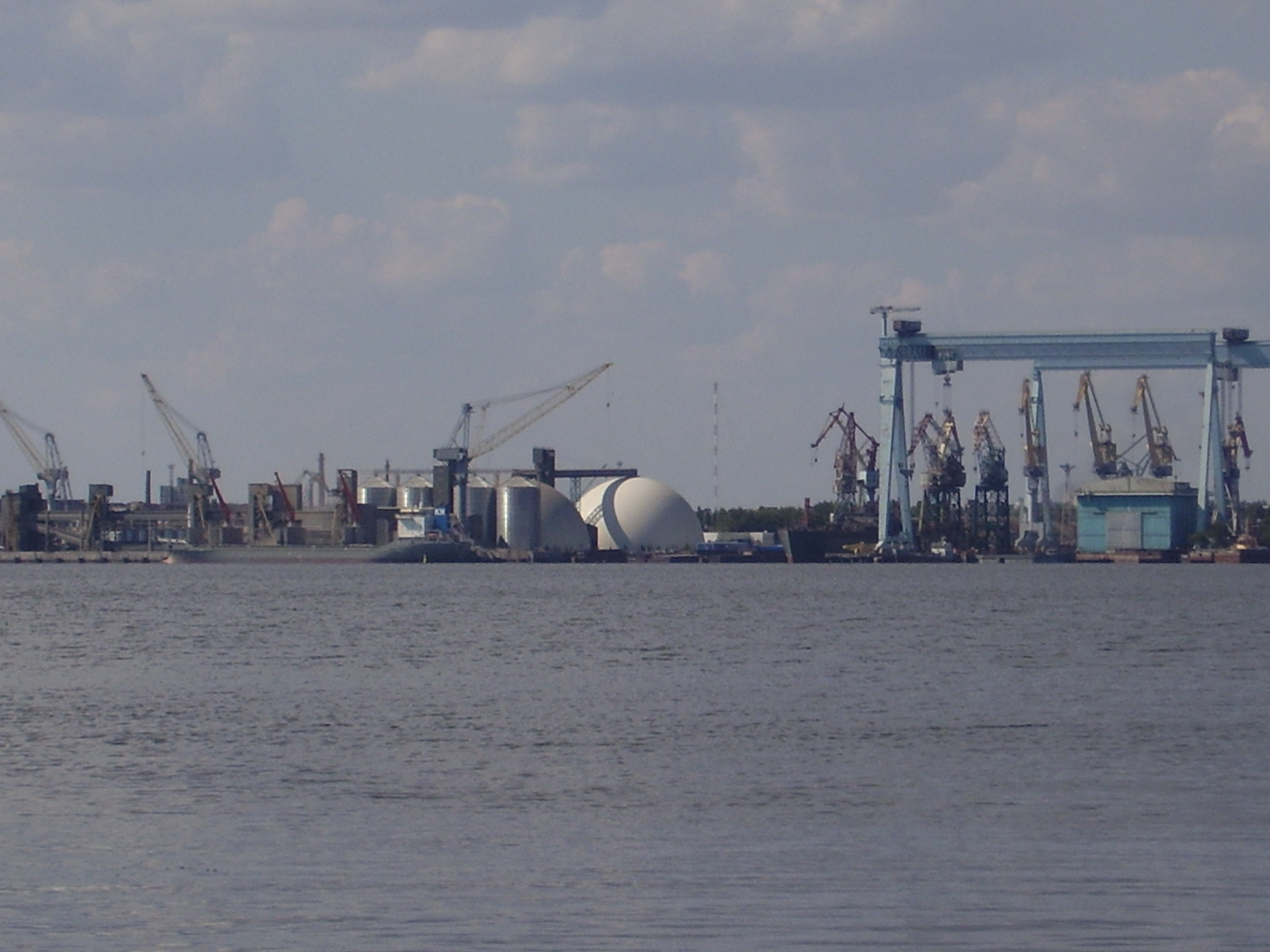
Nibulon Shipyard

The NIBULON Shipbuilding and Shiprepair Yard (Ukrainian: Суднобудівно-судноремонтний завод «Нібулон») is a Ukrainian shipyard that is located in Mykolaiv, owned by agricultural company NIBULON. It is located right next to the former Black Sea Shipyard.

== History ==
As an independent company, the enterprise was founded in 1886. The main activity of the company was ship repair. In 1933 the plant began to build barges, floating docks, steel lights and steel structures for waterworks.

In the early 90s, the company began the construction of yachts. There were built two motor-sailing schooner AQUATON-88 (length 26.7 meters), which became the first mega-yachts built in the then USSR. One of these yachts is a training schooner in the naval forces of Spain.

At the same time the yard, with support from the Ukrainian Government, built small fishing vessels for the companies located on the Black Sea and Sea of Azov. At the request of customers who bought old decommissioned military boats, the plant takes care of their repair, modernization and renovation. At the same time the plant is establishing manufacturing and installation of furniture for yachts, including some made of precious wood.

In 1995, the plant was privatized and reorganized into an open joint stock company. It undertook production of sailing and motor sailing yachts and boats.

In 2000, the enterprise was rebranded to Lyman Shipbuilding Plant.

In August 2012, the NIBULON company acquired the assets and property complex of the Liman Shipbuilding Plant. NIBULON Shipbuilding and Shiprepair Yard was created. The large-scale reconstruction and modernization of the shipyard was carried out for the purpose of construction and maintenance of the trading fleet of NIBULON.

On June 10, 2016, NIBULON Shipyard launched the second self-propelled vessel B2000. In general it was planned to build eight vessels of this type. The vessels operate in tandem with tugboats.

In 2019, the shipyard built a 140-m NIBULON MAX floating crane, which became one of the largest ships built in Ukraine for a decade. It was put into operation during the international TRANS EXPO ODESA-MYKOLAIV 2019 Forum at NIBULON Shipbuilding and Shiprepair Yard.

NIBULON Shipbuilding and Shiprepair Yard works under the supervision of, and its operations meet the requirements of, the Shipping Register of Ukraine.

In May 2020, Bureau Veritas Certification Ukraine successfully certified the shipyard's Integrated Management System (IMS) for compliance with the strictest requirements of the ISO international and DSTU national standards covering quality management (ISO 9001:2015 and DSTU 9001:2015), environmental management (ISO 14001:2015 and DSTU 14001:2015), and occupational health and safety management system (ISO 45001:2018 and DSTU 45001:2018). In 2021, the shipyard successfully passed the first supervisory audit of the Integrated Management System.

In 2020 the company was granted a government contract for manufacturing five OCEA-brand patrol boats for the State Border Service of Ukraine.

On July 1, 2021, a new facility with the organizational and legal form of a limited liability company was established on the basis of the company's structural division – NIBULON Shipbuilding and Shiprepair Yard.

In November 2021, NIBULON shipyard and Ocea of France officially signed an agreement to build 5 OCEA FPB 98 MKI fast patrol boats as part of the government project to strengthen Ukraine's maritime safety and security.

The commencement of work was scheduled for February 2022. Due to the full-scale Russian invasion of Ukraine, the partners had to come up with an alternative solution to continue implementing the agreement. The parties agreed to relocate production to France with mandatory involvement of the Ukrainian side. Shipbuilders from NIBULON shipyard are carrying out the implementation of the intergovernmental agreement at the facilities of OCEA shipyard, Les Sables-d'Olonne.

== Vessels built ==
The shipyard builds complete vessels and floating facilities, in particular:

- POSS-115 project tugs
- 121 project tugs
- 121M project tugs (modernized project)
- T3500 project tugs
- T410 project harbour pusher tugs
- non-self-propelled NBL-91 project vessels
- non-self-propelled B1500 project open type vessels
- non-self-propelled B2000 project vessels
- non-self-propelled B5000 project vessels
- non-self-propelled B5000M project vessels (modernized project)
- self-propelled SDS-15 project dredger
- non-self-propelled floating cranes
- self-propelled P-140 project floating crane

== Recognition ==
NIBULON was ranked first among Ukraine's shipyards based on the rating provided by the Association of Shipbuilders of Ukraine “Ukrsudprom”.

== See also ==
- NIBULON
- Oleksiy Vadaturskyy
- Andriy Vadaturskyi
