= Registro Internacional Naval =

Coordinates: 38°46′05.9″N 9°10′51.8″W

Registro Internacional Naval (RINAVE) is a maritime classification society, based in Lisbon, Portugal.

== Origin ==
RINAVE was formally established in 1973.

On 23 May 1974, RINAVE was officially recognised by the Portuguese Government as a Classification Society and authorised to perform surveys on their behalf in order to verify a vessel's compliance with international conventions, codes and resolutions covering safety at sea.

== Operations ==
RINAVE undertakes approval of plans for vessels before they are built, surveys during the construction phase and the issuance of a suitable class certificate when they are completed.

RINAVE undertakes periodical surveys of ships in service to ensure that quality and safety standards are maintained. It also surveys vessels under repair and being converted.

In 2004 RINAVE co-operated with other organisations in a project to study the safe abandoning of ships and the improvement of life saving appliance systems (SAFECRAFTS).
