= Overseas Marine Certification Services =

Overseas Marine Certification Services also known as OMCS CLASS is an independent classification society, Recognized Organization (R.O.) and Recognized Security Organization (R.S.O.) based on Panama City, Republic of Panama.

The society's was founded in 2004, establishing their head office in Panama, it has four regional offices located in Shanghai (China), Dubai (United Arab Emirates), Canary Islands (Spain) and Asuncion (Paraguay).

The main vision of OMCS CLASS is to provide classification, certification, verification and advisory services is duly authorized by several national maritime administrations, such as Panama, Vanuatu, Sierra Leone, Cambodia, Belize, Togo, Palau, Bolivia and Paraguay, among others.

== Available Services ==
As a Classification Society and Recognized Organization, OMCS CLASS can carry out statutory inspections on behalf of different flag administrations; verify the compliance with international Conventions and provide a range of guidance on forthcoming legislation and help to reduce the risk of port state control detention.

- Statutory Certification.
1. Safety Of Life At Sea, SOLAS.
2. Load Lines.
3. Prevention of Marine Pollution from ships, MARPOL.
4. Tonnage Measurements.
5. ISPS Code.
6. ISM Code.
7. Maritime Labour Convention, 2006 (MLC).
- Advisory & Consultancy.
- Ship Classification.
- Plan, Booklet and Manual Approvals.
- Risk Management.

== Historical Record ==
- In 2009, was successfully opened a regional Middle East office in Dubai. That office has been granted with the operating permit from the Maritime Authority of Dubai, United Arab Emirates.
- The society began business in Asia in 2010 opening their first office in Shanghai (China), with the objective of providing better service to ships in the Far East,
- May 21, 2010, OMCS CLASS receive the certification of its quality management system in accordance with ISO 9001:2008 from the certifying agency ABS-QE.
- In 2013, was opened a European Regional Office in Canary islands, Spain, in order to benefit with the strategic location.
- In early 2015, OMCS CLASS opened a regional office in South America, strategically located in Asuncion, Paraguay; with the purpose of extend their services in the Paraná - Paraguay River (Waterway)
