= RINA (company) =

Italian company

- Formerly: Registro Italiano Navale
- Type: Società per azioni
- Industry: Energy and Mobility, Marine, Certification, Industry, Real Estate and Infrastructure
- Founded: 1861
- Headquarters: Genoa, Italy
- Area served: Global
- Key people: Paolo Moretti (CEO and General Manager); Ugo Salerno (Executive Chairman)
- Services: Various
- Revenue: €1.03 billion (2025)
- Number of employees: 7,000 (2026)
- Website: www.rina.org

RINA is a private, multinational company headquartered in Genoa, Italy. It was founded in 1861 under the name Registro Italiano Navale (Italian Naval Register).

In 1999, following the enforcement of a 1994 European Council directive regarding the inspection, survey and certification of ships that liberalized the ship classification market, the Registro Italiano Navale transferred all operational activities to RINA S.p.A., making it the sole, and later, majority shareholder.

Until 1999, RINA worked almost exclusively as a ship classification company. It has since included operations in the following sectors: Energy and Mobility, Marine, Certification, Industry and Real Estate and Infrastructure. The company has also expanded its services in the fields of testing, inspection and certification and engineering consultancy.

== History ==
=== Registro Italiano Navale ===
RINA was founded as operational company RINA S.p.A. by Registro Italiano Navale, a private body founded in Genoa in 1861, to resolve a number of economic concerns involved in the maritime transport sector. It is the third-oldest ship classification register in the world, after the English Lloyd's Register (1760) and the French Bureau Veritas (1828). It is also a founding member of the IACS, a non-governmental organization that currently consists of twelve member marine classification societies. In its first 140 years, the Registro Italiano Navale operated as a monopoly on ships flying the Italian flag. Subsequently, a European directive came into force, which liberalized the ship classification and related activities, and led the Registro to enter for the first time a competitive market.

=== RINA S.p.A. ===
In 1999, the Registro Italiano Navale transferred all the operational activities to a brand-new company, RINA S.p.A., (Note: In an official note dated August 4, 1999, prot. no. R/228, filed on August 17, 1999, prot. no. 757.661, the Italian Naval Register informed the Italian Ministry of Industry, Commerce and Handicrafts about the set-up of the private company RINA S.p.a., with head office in via Corsica, 12 - Genoa (Italy), to which it transferred all operational activities related to classification, certification, assessment, testing, training, advisory and research in the maritime sector and in other productive sectors.) of which it then became the sole shareholder, now the majority shareholder. Currently, the Registro Italiano Navale is a private non-profit organization, comparable to a foundation.

=== RINA Services S.p.A. ===
In 2009, RINA Services S.p.A. was established, a company to which RINA S.p.A. transferred the authorisations and accreditations relating to classification, certification, auditing and testing services.

In the following years, RINA acquired three companies operating in the consulting engineering market, D'Appolonia (2012), Centro Sviluppo Materiali (2014) and Edif Group Limited (2016). In 2017, D'Appolonia was rebranded as RINA Consulting.

== Organisation and structure ==
The group is headed by RINA S.p.A., which acts as the holding company and no longer carries out operational activities, but provides the group with administrative, organisational and financial services. As parent company, RINA S.p.A. also controls the two main sub-holdings RINA Services S.p.A. and RINA Consulting S.p.A.

Until 2023 the shareholders of RINA S.p.A. and therefore of the whole Group, are Registro Italiano Navale, with a large majority share (70%), Naus S.p.A. (27%) and RINA management (3%).

On June 1, 2002, Ugo Salerno was appointed Chief Executive Officer of RINA; since 2012, he has also held the position of Chairman.

On 13 December 2023, Fondo Italiano d'Investimento SGR officially entered into the shareholder structure of RINA S.p.A. The new share distribution gives Registro Italiano Navale a majority stake, 33% to Fondo Italiano d'Investimento and other co-investors led by it, and 3.5% to RINA's management.

Concurrently, on the same day, the Board of Directors of RINA S.p.A. appointed Carlo Luzzatto as the CEO and General Manager of the company, while Ugo Salerno remains in his role as the Executive Chairman.

On 23 October 2026, the new Board of Directors of RINA S.p.A. appointed Paolo Moretti as the CEO and General Manager of the company, succeeding Carlo Luzzatto.

The first office outside of Italy was opened in Shanghai in 1885. Today, it has a network of over 200 offices in 70 countries worldwide with a workforce of over 7,000 people. Its head office is in Genoa.

== Services ==
RINA provides quality assurance and certification for ship's components and accessories, including life-saving appliances, marine pollution prevention, fire protection, navigation, radio communication equipment, deck gear, cables, rodes, and anchors. It also provides engineering consultancy services through the RINA Consulting S.p.A. and its subsidiaries.

RINA is one of the founding members of IACS and actively participates in technical, research and rule-making groups in different institutional contexts at national and international level.

== Controversy ==
In December 1999 the tanker MV Erika sank off the coast of Brittany, causing a major oil spill. RINA was the certification society responsible for issuing all the safety certificates for Erika. The case came to trial in 2007 and Total, which chartered the oil tanker, was eventually found guilty and ordered to pay a fine of 375,000 € and a compensation to the civil parties of 200 M €.

In December 2012 the garment factory Ali Enterprises in Karachi burned down, resulting in 289 deaths. The Company was certified in the weeks before this incident by RINA with a SA8000 certificate.
