= Oleksiy Vadaturskyy =

Ukrainian businessman (1947–2022)

- Олексій Вадатурський
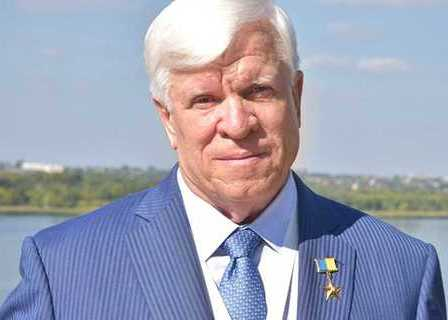
- Born: 8 September 1947; Bendzary, Balta Raion, Odesa Oblast, Ukrainian SSR, USSR
- Died: 31 July 2022 (aged 74); Mykolaiv, Ukraine
- Cause of death: Missile strike on the city of Mykolaiv
- Occupation: Founder of agricultural company Nibulon
- Spouse: Rayisa Vadaturska
- Children: Andriy Vadaturskyi
- Honours: Hero of Ukraine (2007)

Oleksiy Opanasovych Vadaturskyy (Ukrainian: Олексій Опанасович Вадатурський; 8 September 1947 – 31 July 2022) was a Ukrainian agricultural and grain logistics businessman and the founder of Nibulon, the largest grain logistics company in Ukraine. He was one of the wealthiest Ukrainians.

== Biography ==
Oleksiy Vadaturskyy was born in a farmer’s family in Odesa region on September 8, 1947.

In 1971, he graduated from Odesa Technological Institute of Food Industry named after M. V. Lomonosov.

Oleksiy started his career at Trykratne Plant of Bread Products as a chief power engineer, and later became a chief engineer.

From 1980 to 1983, he headed the production department at Mykolaiv Regional Department of Bread Products.

From 1983 to 1993, he held the position of the deputy head at Mykolaiv Regional Department of Bread Products.

In 1991, Oleksiy Vadaturskyy founded Nibulon, a company mainly specializing in producing and selling hybrid corn and sunflower seeds.

From 1998 to 2006, Vadaturskyy was twice elected a deputy of the Mykolaiv Regional Council.

In November 2007, he was awarded the title of Hero of Ukraine by President Viktor Yushchenko.

In November 2018, the Russian government introduced sanctions against Vadaturskyy and Nibulon.

=== Death ===
In the early hours of 31 July 2022, Vadaturskyy and his wife were killed by a Russian missile strike on their private house in the city of Mykolaiv. Seven or eight Russian missiles hit his home in the Zavodsky district, raising strong suspicions that Vadaturskyy was intentionally targeted and assassinated by Russia to affect the crop export industry of Ukraine. Ukraine stated that the missile which killed Vadaturskyy belonged to the S-300 series of missiles. Mykhailo Podolyak, an advisor to Ukrainian President Volodymyr Zelenskyy, called the missile strike a "premeditated murder [of] one of the most important agricultural entrepreneurs in the country". The attack occurred as the first shipment of grain was getting ready to leave Ukraine on 1 August. The Orthodox funeral service for Vadaturskyy on 12 August in a Kyiv cathedral was attended by several hundred people, including the mayor of Mykolaiv, Oleksandr Senkevych.

Vadaturskyy was succeeded by his son Andriy Vadaturskyi, a politician, co-owner of Nibulon (till August 2022), married, with three children.

== Personal life ==
He was married to Rayisa Vadaturska. The couple's son is Andriy Vadaturskyy.

== Involvement in the Russo-Ukraine War ==
In 2014, following the Russian annexation of Crimea and support of separatists in the Donbass regions, Vadaturskyy financed a 2,000-strong militia with army vehicles. In 2018, he became one of 322 Ukrainians blacklisted by Russia. Following the 2022 Russian invasion, the blockade of grain exports, and the grain export agreement of 22 July, Vadaturskyy and his businesses were devising solutions to resume the normal flow of Ukrainian grain to foreign countries.

== Net Worth ==
In 2021, Forbes rated Vadaturskyy's net worth at $430 million and named him as Ukraine's 24th wealthiest person.

== Honours ==
Vadaturskyy was awarded the Hero of Ukraine in 2007, the country's highest honour, for his role in the development of Ukrainian agricultural industry. Vadaturskyy was known as non-corruptible and pro-European.

In 2008, Nibulon's team, headed by Oleksiy Vadaturskyy, received the State Prize of Ukraine in the Field of Architecture.

Based on the results of the 22nd annual “Person of the Year. Citizen of the Year” city program, Oleksiy Vadaturskyy was acknowledged as a Hero of 2020 for his considerable contribution to public health, fighting the coronavirus pandemic.

== See also ==
- Nibulon Shipyard
