= Mykolaiv strikes (2022–present) =

Battle during the Russian invasion of Ukraine

The Russian Armed Forces have launched several rocket attacks on Mykolaiv, Ukraine, during the Russian invasion of Ukraine.

== 2022 strikes ==
=== February 2022 ===
Mykolaiv was shelled in the evening of 26 February 2022. Explosions were heard in several parts of the city, and a shell landed between high-rise buildings in the city's northern micro-district.

=== March 2022 ===
On 7 March, Mykolaiv was shelled by Smerch rocket launchers starting at 5:15. The shelling resulted in the death of one man in the city's Ternivka district. Residential buildings, a pharmacy, the Specialized Seaport Olvia, and the city zoo were affected; an unexploded shell landed near the tigers and polar bears, but no animals were hurt. Gas pipelines were damaged, and part of the city lost its heat supply. Firefighters extinguished fires throughout Mykolaiv. It was later reported that among the targets of the Russian shelling were the barracks of the 79th Air Assault Brigade, where 16 Ukrainian soldiers were killed or missing and dozens of others were injured.

On 18 March, Russian forces attacked the military quarters of the 137th Independent Marine Batalion and the 36th Marine Brigade in the northern suburbs of Mykolaiv killing at 110 soldiers and wounding 100.

==== Mykolaiv cluster bombing ====
On 13 March 2022, during the Russian invasion of Ukraine, Russian Armed Forces bombed Mykolaiv with cluster munitions, killing 9 civilians and injuring 13.

==== Government building missile strike ====
On 29 March 2022, Russian forces carried out a missile strike (supposedly using Kalibr missile) on the Mykolaiv Regional State Administration's headquarters during the battle of Mykolaiv. It resulted in at least 37 deaths and 34 injuries.

=== June 2022 ===
On 28 June, shelling damaged Central City Stadium and an abandoned military base. On 29 June, a Russian rocket strike hit a five-storey residential building, killing at least 8 people and injuring 6.

=== July 2022 ===
On 15 July, the city's two largest universities were struck by missiles: Admiral Makarov National University of Shipbuilding and Mykolaiv National University.

On 29 July, five people were killed and seven were injured at a bus stop in Mykolaiv after Russians shelled the city. Another strike on 30 July killed Oleksiy Vadaturskyi, the owner of Ukrainian agricultural company Nibulon, along with his wife.

=== August 2022 ===
On 17 August, two missiles hit Petro Mohyla Black Sea State University. Two days later, according to Ukrainian media it was shelled again with two S-300 missiles.

=== October 2022 ===
On 16 October, Russian kamikaze drones struck two tanks with sunflower oil for export (about 7.5 thousand tons each) in Mykolaiv. The tanks caught fire and the oil flowed through the streets.

=== November 2022 ===
On 1 November, new shelling partially destroyed a historic gymnasium (1892), a polytechnic college and damaged neighboring residential buildings. One person was reported to be killed.

On 11 November, shelling of the city collapsed part of a five-story residential building, killing 9 people.

== 2023 strikes ==
=== May 2023 ===
On 7 May 2023, a new attack was carried out with three rockets.

On 16 May 2023, an attack was carried by Russia on Mykolaiv shopping mall, with one man injured.

=== July 2023 ===
On 20 July 2023, Mykolaiv was struck as part of a series of Russian air strikes on the southern Ukrainian port cities.

They were seen as retaliatory strikes by Russia, following its withdrawal from a deal that allowed Ukrainian Black Sea grain shipments. Russia accused Ukraine of being behind explosions on a bridge used for transporting Russian military supplies.

The strikes involved the launch of 19 missiles and 19 drones by Russian forces. Ukrainian military reported that they managed to shoot down five of the missiles and 13 of the drones. The attacks resulted in significant damage to several residential buildings and caused a large fire in the city of Mykolaiv.

A married couple was killed as a result of the strikes. The Kyiv Independent reported that the strike against Mykolaiv resulted in 19 people being injured, including at least five children. Eight people sought medical help, and two, including a child, were hospitalized.

Ukrainian President Volodymyr Zelenskyy condemned the attacks, stating that "Russian terrorists continue their attempts to destroy the life of our country."

== See also ==
- Battle of Mykolaiv
