= Bulgarian Register of Shipping =

Bulgarian Register of Shipping (Bulgarian: Български корабен регистър - Bulgarski Koraben Registur), known as BRS (БКР), is the national classification society of the Republic of Bulgaria, founded in 1950. The society's head office is in Varna, its inspection offices are in Varna, Burgas (at Black Sea) and Ruse (at Danube).

BRS adheres to a quality system in compliance with the requirements of the ISO 9001 standard. It has developed its own technical requirements (rules) in line with the international conventions for its classification services.

In September, 2005, BRS was approved by the United States Coast Guard as a Classification Society in accordance with the 2004 Coast Guard and Maritime Transportation Act, Section 413, 46 U.S.C. 3316(c).
