= Ship classification society =

Organisation establishing technical standards for ships and offshore structures

A ship classification society or ship classification organisation is a non-governmental organization that establishes and maintains technical standards for the construction and operation of ships and offshore structures. Classification societies certify that the construction of a vessel complies with relevant standards and carry out regular surveys in service to ensure continuing compliance with the standards. Currently, more than 50 organizations describe their activities as including marine classification, twelve of which are members of the International Association of Classification Societies.

A classification certificate issued by a classification society recognised by the proposed ship register is required for a ship's owner to be able to register the ship and to obtain marine insurance on the ship, and may be required to be produced before a ship's entry into some ports or waterways, and may be of interest to charterers and potential buyers. To avoid liability, classification societies explicitly disclaim responsibility for the safety, fitness for purpose, or seaworthiness of the ship, but is a verification only that the vessel is in compliance with the classification standards of the society issuing the classification certificate.

Classification societies also issue International Load Line Certificates in accordance with the legislation of participating states giving effect to the International Convention on Load Lines (CLL 66/88). When the classification societies are issuing certification on behalf of maritime administrations are called recognized organizations and recognized security organizations when they issue certification for International Ship and Port Facility Security Code. When they act on behalf of International Maritime Organization member states they have to comply with the RO code. The RO Code provides flag States with a standard that will assist in achieving harmonized and consistent global implementation of requirements established by the instrument of the International Maritime Organization (IMO) for the assessment and authorization of recognized organizations (ROs)

== Responsibilities ==
Classification societies set technical rules based on experience and research, confirm that designs and calculations meet these rules, survey ships and structures during the process of construction and commissioning, and periodically survey vessels to ensure that they continue to meet the rules. Classification societies are also responsible for classing oil platforms, other offshore structures, and submarines. This survey process covers diesel engines, important shipboard pumps and other vital machinery. Since the 1950s, the USSR (now Russian) Register of Shipping has classified nuclear ships, the only classification society to do so.

Classification surveyors inspect ships to make sure that the ship, its components and machinery are built and maintained according to the standards required for their class.

== History ==
In the second half of the 18th century, London merchants, shipowners, and captains often gathered at Edward Lloyd's coffee house to gossip and make deals including sharing the risks and rewards of individual voyages. This became known as underwriting after the practice of signing one's name to the bottom of a document pledging to make good a portion of the losses if the ship didn't make it in return for a portion of the profits. It did not take long to realize that the underwriters needed a way of assessing the quality of the ships that they were being asked to insure. In 1760, the Register Society was formed — the first classification society and the one which would subsequently become Lloyd's Register — to publish an annual register of ships. This publication attempted to classify the condition of the ship's hull and equipment. At that time, an attempt was made to classify the condition of each ship on an annual basis. The condition of the hull was classified A, E, I, O or U, according to the state of its construction and its adjudged continuing soundness (or lack thereof). Equipment was G, M, or B: simply, good, middling or bad. In time, G, M and B were replaced by 1, 2 and 3, which is the origin of the well-known expression 'A1', meaning 'first or highest class'. The purpose of this system was not to assess safety, fitness for purpose or seaworthiness of the ship. It was to evaluate risk.

Samuel Plimsoll pointed out the obvious downside of insurance:

The ability of shipowners to insure themselves against the risks they take not only with their property, but with other peoples’ lives, is itself the greatest threat to the safe operation of ships.

The first edition of the Register of Ships was published by Lloyd's Register in 1764 and was for use in the years 1764 to 1766.

Bureau Veritas (BV) was founded in Antwerp in 1828, moving to Paris in 1832. Lloyd's Register reconstituted in 1834 to become 'Lloyd's Register of British and Foreign Shipping'. Where previously surveys had been undertaken by retired sea captains, from this time surveyors started to be employed and Lloyd's Register formed a General Committee for the running of the Society and for the Rules regarding ship construction and maintenance, which began to be published from this time.

In 1834, the Register Society published the first Rules for the survey and classification of vessels, and changed its name to Lloyds Register of Shipping. A full-time bureaucracy of surveyors (inspectors) and support personnel was put in place. Similar developments were taking place in the other major maritime nations.

The adoption of common rules for ship construction by Norwegian insurance societies in the late 1850s led to the establishment of Det Norske Veritas (DNV) in 1864. RINA was founded in Genoa, Italy in 1861 under the name Registro Italiano Navale, to meet the needs of Italian maritime operators. Germanischer Lloyd (GL) was formed in 1867 and Nippon Kaiji Kyokai (ClassNK) in 1899. The Russian Maritime Register of Shipping (RS) was an early offshoot of the River Register of 1913.

As the classification profession evolved, the practice of assigning different classifications has been superseded, with some exceptions. Today a ship either meets the relevant class society's rules or it does not. As a consequence, it is either 'in' or 'out' of 'class'. Classification societies do not issue statements or certifications that a vessel is 'fit to sail' or 'unfit to sail', merely that the vessel is in compliance with the required codes. This is in part related to legal liability of the classification society. However, each of the classification societies has developed a series of notations that may be granted to a vessel to indicate that it is in compliance with some additional criteria that may be either specific to that vessel type or that are in excess of the standard classification requirements. See Ice class as an example.

There have always been concerns that competitive pressure might lead to falling standards – as expressed for example by the European Commission. To counteract class hopping, in 2009, the International Association of Classification Societies (IACS) implemented the Transfer of Class Agreement (TOCA), whereby no member would accept a ship that had not carried out improvements demanded by its previous class society.

== Today ==
Currently, more than 50 organizations worldwide describe their activities as including marine classification, some of which are listed below. Twelve of these are members of the International Association of Classification Societies. The largest are DNV, Bureau Veritas, the American Bureau of Shipping, Nippon Kaiji Kyokai (ClassNK) and Lloyd's Register. Classification societies employ naval architects, ship surveyors, material engineers, piping engineers, mechanical engineers and electrical engineers, often located at ports and office buildings around the world.

Marine vessels and structures are classified according to the soundness of their structure and design for the purpose of the vessel. The classification rules are designed to ensure an acceptable degree of stability, safety, environmental impact, etc.

In particular, classification societies may be authorised to inspect ships, oil rigs, submarines, and other marine structures and issue certificates on behalf of the flag state.

As well as providing classification and certification services, the larger societies also conduct research at their own research facilities in order to improve the effectiveness of their rules and to investigate the safety of new innovations in shipbuilding.

In the aftermath of the Russian invasion of Ukraine from 2022, a Finnish Maritime Expert reported, that Russia does no longer oblige the principles of the Port State Control System and even poorly maintained ships can leave port without inspection.

== List of classification societies ==
Name	Abbreviation	Date	Head office	IACS member?
Lloyd's Register	LR	1760	London	Yes
Bureau Veritas	BV	1828	Paris	Yes
Austrian Veritas/Adriatic Veritas	AV	1858–1921	Trieste	—N/a
Registro Italiano Navale	RINA	1861	Genoa	Yes
American Bureau of Shipping	ABS	1862	Houston	Yes
DNV (Det Norske Veritas)	DNV	1864	Oslo	Yes
Germanischer Lloyd	GL	1867–2013	Hamburg	No
Nippon Kaiji Kyokai (ClassNK)	NK	1899	Tokyo	Yes
Russian Maritime Register of Shipping (Российский морской регистр судоходства)	RS	1913	Saint Petersburg	No
Hellenic Register of Shipping	HR	1919	Piraeus	No
Polish Register of Shipping (Polski Rejestr Statków)	PRS	1936	Gdańsk	Yes
Phoenix Register of Shipping	PHRS	2000	Piraeus	No
Korean Classification Society	KCS	1947	Pyongyang	No
Libero Hellenic Register	LHR	2018	Piraeus	No
Croatian Register of Shipping (Hrvatski Registar Brodova)	CRS	1949	Split	Yes
Bulgarian Register of Shipping (Български Корабен Регистър)	BRS (БКР)	1950	Varna	No
CR Classification Society	CR	1951	Taipei	No
China Classification Society	CCS	1956	Beijing	Yes
Turk Loydu	TL	1962	Istanbul	Yes
Korean Register of Shipping	KR	1960	Busan	Yes
Indonesian Classification Bureau (Biro Klasifikasi Indonesia)	BKI	1964	Jakarta	No
Vietnam Register	VR	1964	Hanoi	No
Registro Internacional Naval	RINAVE	1973–2004	Lisbon	No
Indian Register of Shipping	IRCLASS (IRS)	1975	Mumbai	Yes
International Register of Shipping	IRS	1993	Miami	No
Shipping Register of Ukraine (Регістр судноплавства України)	RU (РУ)	1998	Kyiv	No
Dromon Bureau of Shipping	DBS	2003	Piraeus	No
Overseas Marine Certification Services	OMCS	2004	Panama	No
Iranian Classification Society	ICS	2006	Tehran	No
Maritime Bureau of Africa	MBA	2014	Cape Town	No
International Maritime Classification	IMC	2015	Dubai	No
Dutch Lloyd	DL	2018	Eindhoven	No
Asia Classification Society	ACS	1980	Tehran	No
Registro Brasileiro de Navios e Aeronaves	RBNA	1982	Rio de Janeiro	No
MY Classification	MYC	2021	Malaysia	No
Ocean Register of Shipping, Inc.	ORSI	2003	Philippines	No
Ships Classification Malaysia	SCM	1994	Malaysia	No

== See also ==
- International Association of Classification Societies
- Prestige oil spill, an incident and following lawsuit that could have radically changed the role of class societies.
- European Maritime Safety Agency
