= International Register of Shipping =

Independent classification society

The International Register of Shipping or INTLREG was established in 1993, and is an independent classification society which provides classification, certification, verification and advisory services. The International Register of Shipping also offers consulting services well suited for the shipping and offshore industry. For the period 2021 to 2023 the Recognized Organization was listed as medium performance in Paris MoU Port state control regime.

== Services ==
SOPEP at work

Classification

- Appraisal of the design during and after construction
- Surveys at the time of construction, entry into class and modifications to ensure that the vessel meets the criteria stipulated by the rules
- Issuance of a 'Certificate of Classification' and entering of the vessel's particulars into the society's Register of Ships
- Periodical surveys as stipulated by the rules to ensure continued maintenance of conditions of classifications
- Additional surveys as deemed necessary in view of damages or reported poor condition of the vessel by port state control authorities

Verification

- Appraisal of plans and documents
- Stage Inspections during manufacture
- Inspection and testing of components or finished products
- Laboratory testing at approved facilities
- Auditing of the management systems

Statutory Certification

- International Convention on Load line (Load Line)
- International Convention for the Safety of Life at Sea (SOLAS)
- Convention on the International Regulations for Preventing Collisions at Sea (COLREG)
- International Convention for the Prevention of Pollution from Ships (MARPOL)
- International Convention on Tonnage Measurement of Ships (ITC 1969)
- Code of Safe Practice for Solid Bulk Cargoes (BC Code)
- International Management Code for the Safe Operation of Ships and for Pollution Prevention(ISM Code)
- International Ship and Port facility Security Code (ISPS Code)
- International Grain Code (Grain Code)
- Caribbean Cargo Ship Safety Code (Caribbean Code)
- Crew Accommodations, ILO Convention 92,153
- Cargo Gear, ILO Convention 152
- Minimum Standards in Merchant Ships, ILO Convention 147
- Bulk Chemical Code (BCH Code)
- International Bulk Chemical Code (IBC Code)
- Gas Carrier Code (GC Code)
- International Gas Carrier Code (IGC Code)
- High Speed Craft Code (HSC Code)
- Code of Safety for Dynamically Supported Craft

Maritime Consulting

- Preparation of Mandatory Vessel documentations
- Booklet, Cargo Securing Manual, SOPEP, PCSOPEP, SMPEP, P&A Manual, COW manual, ODMCS Manual
- New building Services on behalf of owners
- Concept Design Preparation of Technical Specifications
- Bid Analysis
- Detailed design
- Specification survey during new construction on behalf of owners
- Verification of conformance for purchase of marine equipment
- Design of modifications and renovations and/or refitting
- Failure Mode Effect Analysis, HAZOP, FSA
- Pre-purchase or on hire/off-hire condition surveys
- Port Engineering - including supervision during dry dockings or other repairs
- Computer based preventive maintenance systems

Training

- Complies with ISO 9001:2000 requirements
- Administered through International Register Training Institute (IRTI)

International Register of Shipping's head office is located in Miami, Florida.
