= Croatian Register of Shipping =

Croatian Register Of Shipping (CRS)
- Native name: Hrvatski Registar Brodova
- Company type: Independent, not for profit but common welfare oriented, public foundation
- Industry: Maritime and shipping Energy; Management systems
- Founded: 1858 [Austrian Veritas ] 1949 [CRS]
- Headquarters: 21000 SPLIT, Republic of Croatia
- Area served: Global
- Services: Ship Classification; Risk management Certification of Safety Management Systems; Type Approval; Marine Products Certifications according to EU Directives
- Website: www.crs.hr

Croatian Register of Shipping (Croatian: Hrvatski registar brodova), also known as CRS, is an independent classification society established in 1949. It is a non-profit organisation working on the marine market, developing technical rules and supervising their implementation, managing risk and performing surveys on ships. The Society's head office is in Split.

Croatian Register of Shipping is the member of the International Association of Classification Societies (IACS) since May 2011.

The register is officially recognized by the Malta Maritime Authority.

== Historical record ==
- CRS is a heritor of ship classification activities at the eastern Adriatic coast.
- The Austrian Veritas was founded in this area, already in 1858, as the third classification society in the world.
- In 1918 the Austrian Veritas changed its name into the Adriatic Veritas and was acting as such till year 1921.
- CRS, acting till 1992 as JR (Yugoslav Register of Shipping), was founded in 1949.
- CRS Head Office is situated in Split, Republic of Croatia.
- CRS was associated member of International Association of Classification Societies (IACS) from April 1973 till 2004, and from May 2011 CRS gained the status of IACS Member
- CRS is the recognised classification society (RO) pursuant to the requirements of the Regulation (EC) No. 391/2009 of the European Parliament and of the Council on common rules and standards for ship inspection and survey organisations.
- CRS is the conformity assessment notified body notified under provisions of the Council Directive 94/25/EC relating to recreational craft, as amended by Directive 2003/44/EC.
- CRS is the conformity assessments notified body notified under provisions of the Council Directive 96/98/EC on marine equipment, as amended.
- CRS is the conformity assessments notified body notified under provisions of the Council Directive 97/23/EC (PED) on pressure equipment.
- CRS is the conformity assessments notified body notified under provisions of the Council Directive 2009/105/EC (SPVD) on simple pressure vessels.
- CRS is certified by British Standards Institution (BSI) confirming that CRS operates the Quality Management System which complies with the requirements of BS EN 9001:2008 for the scope of classification and statutory certification of ships, statutory certification of marine equipment and recreational crafts, and BSI Annual Statement of Compliance confirming that CRS Quality Management System complies with IACS Quality System Certification Scheme.

== Status ==
- CRS is an independent, not for profit but common welfare oriented, public foundation performing:
  1. classification of ships;
  2. statutory certification of ships on behalf of the national Maritime Administrations;
  3. statutory certification of recreational crafts;
  4. certification of materials and products;
  5. conformity assessment of marine equipment;
  6. conformity assessment of recreational crafts;
  7. certification / registration of quality management systems.
- The present status of CRS is defined by the Law on Croatian Register of Shipping (OFFICIAL GAZETTE No. 1996/81, as amended by OFFICIAL GAZETTE No. 2013/76) and Charter of CRS.

== Mission ==
- CRS mission in the field of classification and statutory certification is to promote the highest internationally adopted standards in the safety of life and property at sea and inland waterways, as well as in the protection of the sea and inland waterways environment.

== Certification / Accreditation ==
- From July 2005 CRS is in possession of the Certificate issued by British Standards Institution (BSI) which is certifying that CRS operate the Quality Management System which complies with the requirements of BS EN 9001:2000 for the scope of classification and statutory certification of ships, statutory certification of marine equipment and recreational crafts
- From February 2011 CRS is in possession of the “BSI Annual Statement of Compliance confirming Croatian Register of Shipping Compliance with IACS Quality System Certification Scheme.
