= Malta Maritime Authority =

Government agency of Malta

Malta Maritime Authority (MMA, Awtorità Marittima ta' Malta) used to be an independent state corporation and government agency that is responsible for the governance, operation, regulation and promotion of the ports of the Mediterranean archipelago nation of Malta. Operation of the principal cargo port, Malta Freeport, is done in conjunction with Malta Freeport Terminals, a company established in 1988. Malta's smaller ports provide service to pleasure craft and yacht marinas, ferry services, the fishing industry and local trade. The MMA's Ports Directorate is the port authority for all ports in Malta. The Malta International Ship Register is a department of the MMA.

As from 2010 the MMA no longer exists as a separate entity but forms part of Transport Malta, a governmental institution which encompasses transport control of the islands over sea, land and air.

== Major ports ==
Malta has a rich maritime heritage, and principal ports include:

- Malta Freeport at Marsaxlokk Harbour is the nation's principal cargo port.
- Grand Harbour at Valletta is a cargo port that has been in operation since the times of the Roman Empire.
- Marsamxett Harbour has pleasure boat marinas.

== See also ==
- Government of Malta
- Port authority
- Port operator
- Transport in Malta
