= Shipping Register of Ukraine =

The Shipping Register of Ukraine
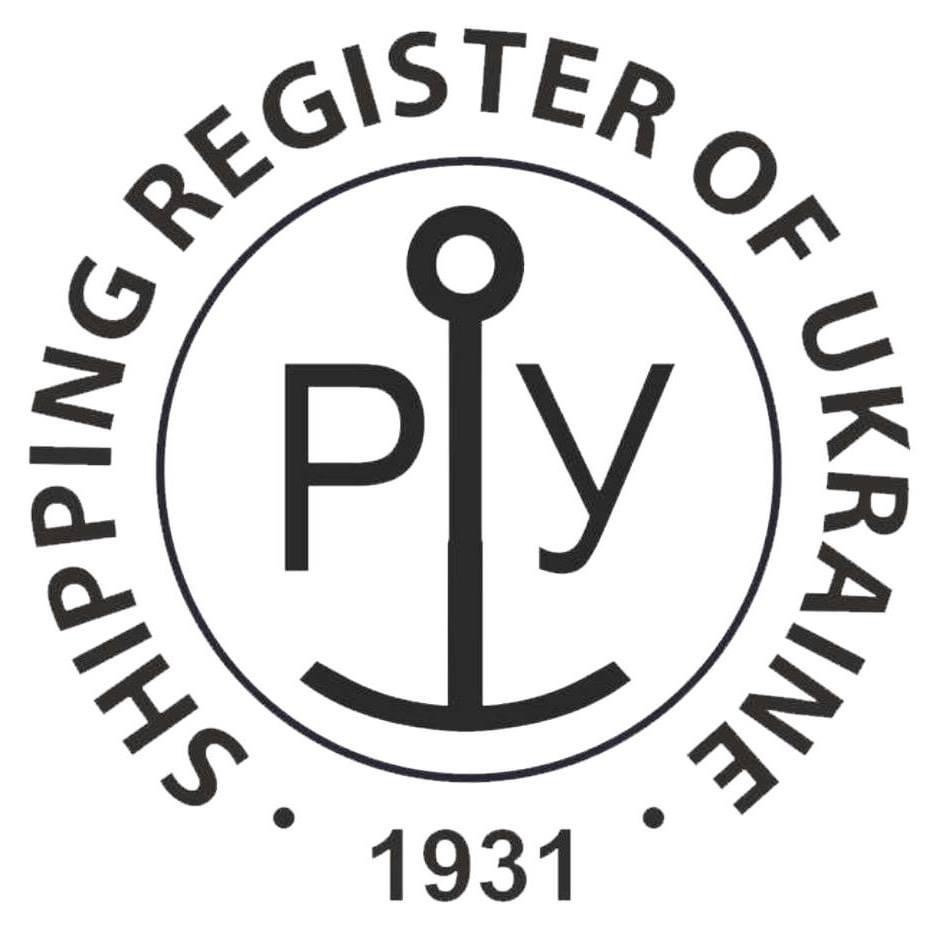
- Industry: Classification society
- Founded: 1998
- Headquarters: Kyiv, Ukraine
- Services: Marine classification and certification
- Website: shipregister.ua

The Shipping Register of Ukraine (Ukrainian: Регістр судноплавства України, romanized: Rehistr sudnoplavstva Ukrainy) is a classification society, whose main activity is a shipping safety at sea and rivers.

Before independence, beginning in 1931, the work of the agency was carried out under the aegis of the Dnipro Inspectorate of the Register.

With the coming of independence in 1991, responsibility shifted to the State Fleet Inspection of Ukraine.

The present organization was established in 1998 with head office in Kyiv, Ukraine. Ten regional representatives, twenty-one survey districts and two departments represents on all the territory of Ukraine.

In 2023, the organization was restructured around five regional offices.
