= Polish Register of Shipping =

Independent ship classification society

Polish Register of Shipping, (Polish: Polski Rejestr Statków S.A.), also known as PRS, is an independent classification society established in 1936. It is a not-for-profit company working on the marine market, developing technical rules and supervising their implementation, managing risk and performing surveys on ships. PRS has been authorized by a number of State Maritime Administrations to act on their behalf. PRS is the only classification societies which has its own team of scuba divers surveyors performing underwater inspections. The Society's head office is placed at 126 Aleja gen. Hallera, Gdańsk, Poland.

== Main activities ==
The development and updating of the rules for classification and construction of floating objects, industrial objects as well as statutory and administration survey guidelines resulting from authorizations granted to PRS by Governments.

Performing surveys for compliance with the requirements of the Society's own rules for classification and construction and/or the requirements of the relevant international conventions as well as national regulations regarding the following:

- floating objects, including naval craft,
- special purpose objects intended for the State security and defence,
- construction of steel structures, pipelines and industrial installations, as well as land objects,
- construction and repair of containers,
- manufacture of materials and products,
- approval of products, manufacturers and service suppliers.

3. Provision of technical expertise and advisory services.

4. Certification

- Certification of quality management systems (ISO 9001)
- Certification of environmental protection systems (ISO 14001)
- Certification of work safety management systems (PN-N-18001)
- HACCP Certification
- Products certification for conformity with the European Union directives

4. Industrial supervision

- Investors supervision of steel structures
- Supervision of gas transfer pipelines, power engineering and municipal media and their equipment
- Investors supervision of motorways, roads, viaducts, tunnels and culverts
- Supervision of land environment protection objects
- Supervision of hydrotechnical objects (weirs, locks, breakwaters, platforms, wharves)

5. Others activities

- Underwater inspections
- Approval of products
- Approval of firms
- Technical expertise and advising for external bodies such as: underwriters, banks
- Research and development

== History ==
- In 1936 Polish Register of Inland Shipping was established
- In 1946 the name of the organisation was changed to Polski Rejestr Statków.
- In 1954 the institution, by decision of the Authorities in power, was transformed into State Enterprise.
- From 1972 to 2000 PRS was a member of IACS.
- After the sinking of the Polish Register classed Leader L in the Western Atlantic on March 23, 2000, PRS's associate status in IACS was terminated with immediate effect.
- In 2001 Polski Rejestr Statków State Enterprise was transformed into a sole proprietorship joint stock company.
- From 2006 PRS is recognised by the European Commission, EMSA.
- On June 3, 2011, PRS was re-admitted into IACS.
- On 2 February 2012 the European Commission issued a Commission Implementing Decision 2012/66/EU on the recognition of the Polish Register of Shipping as a classification society for inland waterway vessels
