= Environmental impact of shipping =

Ocean pollution

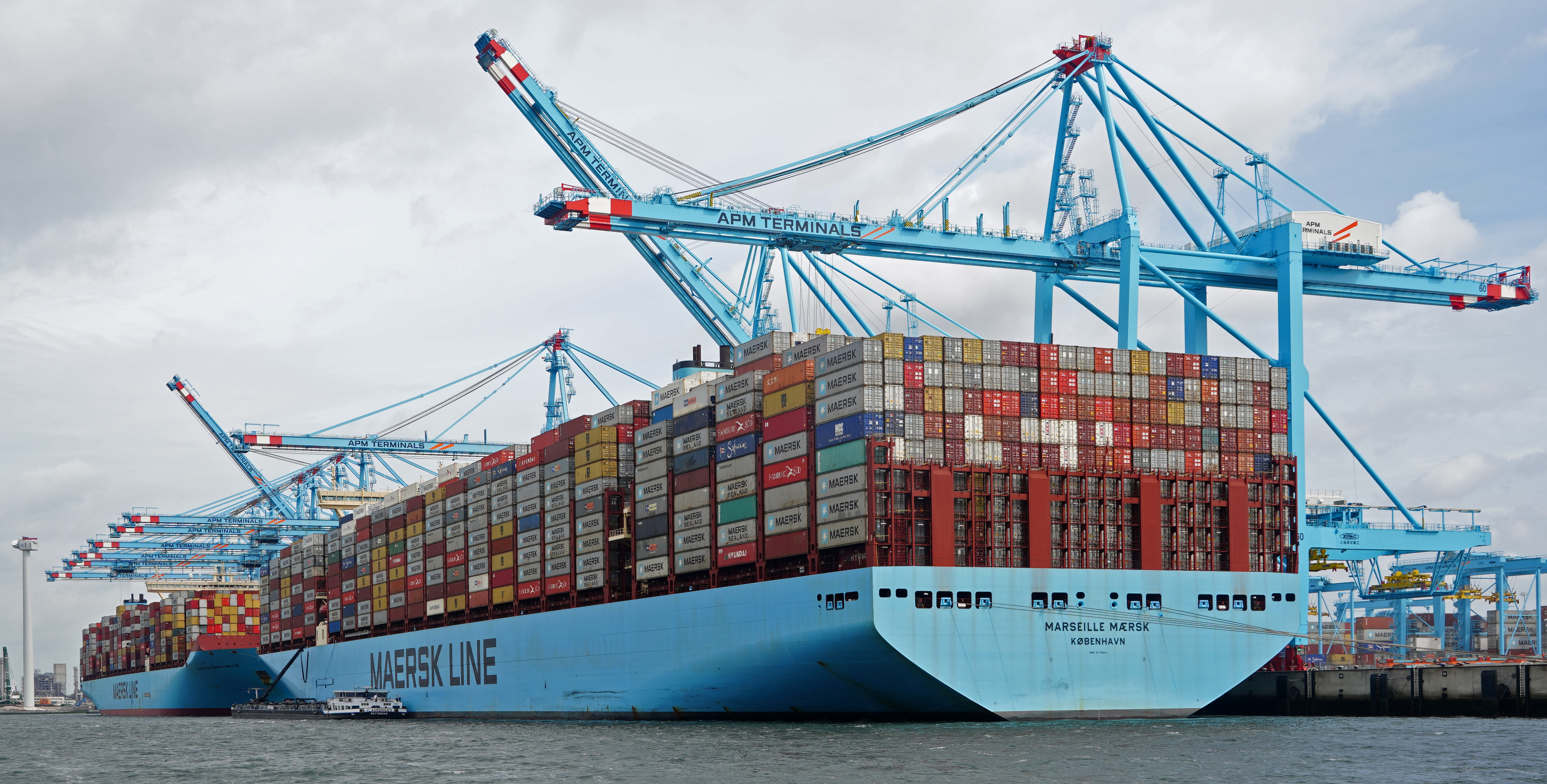
Container ships in port

The environmental impact of shipping include air pollution, water pollution, acoustic, and oil pollution. Ships are responsible for more than 3% of greenhouse gas emissions and 18% of nitrogen oxides pollution.

Although maritime transport is the most energy-efficient method to move a given mass of cargo a given distance, the sheer size of the industry means that it has a significant effect on the environment. The annual increasing amount of shipping overwhelms gains in efficiency, such as from slow-steaming. The growth in tonne-kilometers of sea shipment has averaged 4 percent yearly since the 1990s, and it has grown by a factor of 5 since the 1970s.

The fact that shipping enjoys substantial tax privileges has contributed to the growing emissions.

== Ballast water ==
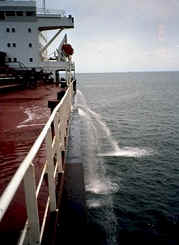
A cargo ship loading ballast water into the tanks

Ballast water discharges by ships can have a negative impact on the marine environment. Cruise ships, large tankers, and bulk cargo carriers use a huge amount of ballast water, which is often taken on in the coastal waters in one region after ships discharge wastewater or unload cargo, and discharged at the next port of call, wherever more cargo is loaded. Ballast water discharge typically contains a variety of biological materials, including plants, animals, viruses, and bacteria. These materials often include non-native, nuisance, invasive, exotic species that can cause extensive ecological and economic damage to aquatic ecosystems along with serious human health problems.

== Sound pollution ==
Noise pollution caused by shipping and other human enterprises has increased in recent history. The noise produced by ships can travel long distances, and marine species who may rely on sound for their orientation, communication, and feeding, can be harmed by this sound pollution.

The Convention on the Conservation of Migratory Species has identified ocean noise as a potential threat to marine life. The disruption of whales' ability to communicate with one another is an extreme threat and is affecting their ability to survive. According to a Discovery Channel article on Sonic Sea Journeys Deep into the Ocean over the last century, extremely loud noise from commercial ships, oil and gas exploration, naval sonar exercises and other sources has transformed the ocean's delicate acoustic habitat, challenging the ability of whales and other marine life to prosper and ultimately to survive. Whales are starting to react to this in ways that are life-threatening. Despite sonar's military and civilian applications, it is destroying marine life. According to IFAW Animal Rescue Program Director Katie Moore, "There's different ways that sounds can affect animals. There's that underlying ambient noise level that's rising, and rising, and rising that interferes with communication and their movement patterns. And then there's the more acute kind of traumatic impact of sound, that's causing physical damage or a really strong behavioral response. It's fight or flight".

== Wildlife collisions ==
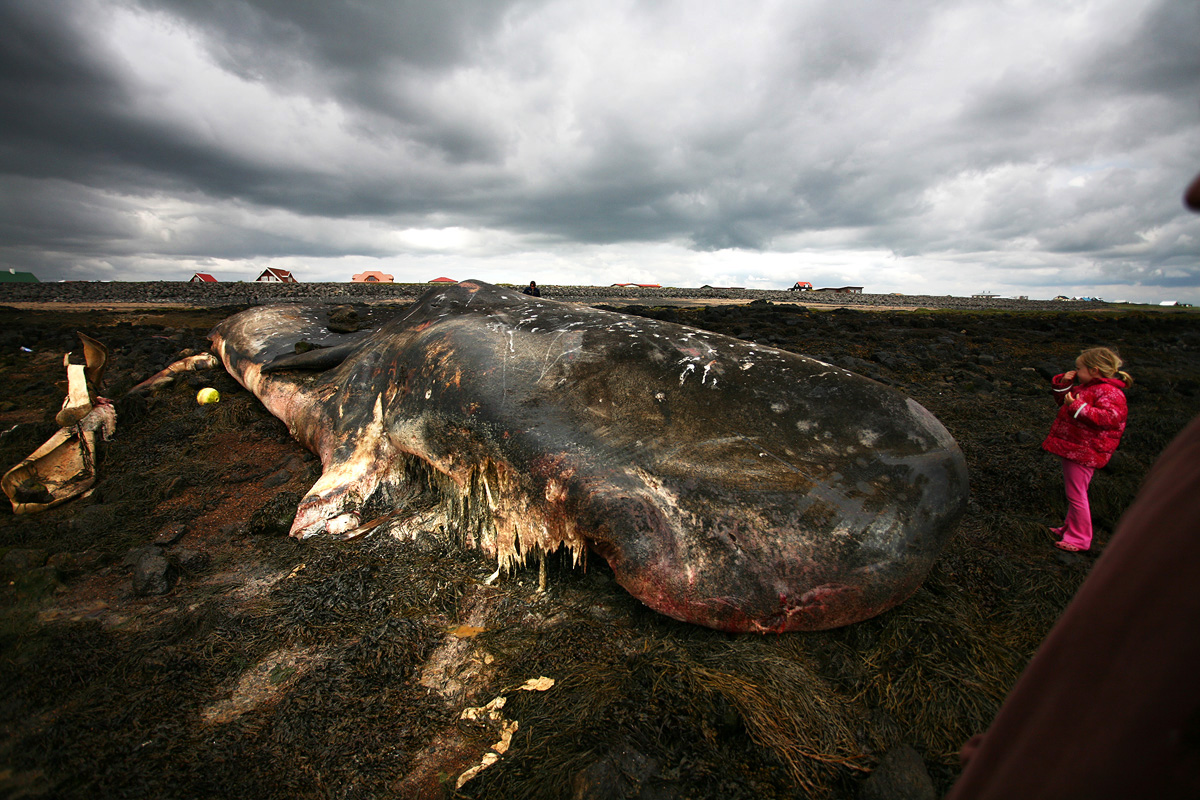
Carcass of a whale on a shore in Iceland

Marine mammals, such as whales and manatees, risk being struck by ships, causing injury and death. For example, a collision with a ship traveling at only 15 knots has a 79% chance of being lethal to a whale. Ship collisions may be one of the leading causes of population decline for whale sharks.

One notable example of the impact of ship collisions is the endangered North Atlantic right whale, of which 400 or fewer remain. The greatest danger to the North Atlantic right whale is injury sustained from ship strikes. Between 1970 and 1999, 35.5% of recorded deaths were attributed to collisions. From 1999 to 2003, incidents of mortality and serious injury attributed to ship strikes averaged one per year. From 2004 to 2006, that number increased to 2.6. Deaths from collisions has become an extinction threat. The United States' National Marine Fisheries Service (NMFS) and National Oceanic and Atmospheric Administration (NOAA) introduced vessel speed restrictions to reduce ship collisions with North Atlantic right whales in 2008, which expired in 2013. However, in 2017 an unprecedented mortality event occurred, resulting in the deaths of 17 North Atlantic right whales caused primarily from ship-strikes and entanglement in fishing gear.

== Atmospheric pollution ==
Exhaust gases from ships are a significant source of air pollution, both for conventional pollutants and greenhouse gases.

=== Conventional pollutants ===
Air pollution from ships is generated by diesel engines that burn high sulfur content fuel oil, also known as bunker oil, producing sulfur dioxide, nitrogen oxide and particulate, in addition to carbon monoxide, carbon dioxide, and hydrocarbons which again leads to the formation of aerosols and secondary chemicals reactions including formations of HCHO and ozone in the atmosphere. Diesel exhaust has been classified by the U.S. Environmental Protection Agency (EPA) as a likely human carcinogen. The agency recognizes that these emissions from marine diesel engines contribute to ozone and carbon monoxide nonattainment (i.e., failure to meet air quality standards), as well as adverse health effects associated with ambient concentrations of particulate matter and visibility, haze, acid deposition, and eutrophication and nitrification of water. EPA estimates that large marine diesel engines accounted for about 1.6 percent of mobile source nitrogen oxide emissions and 2.8 percent of mobile source particulate emissions in the United States in 2000. Contributions of marine diesel engines can be higher on a port-specific basis. Ultra-low-sulfur diesel (ULSD) is a standard for defining diesel fuel with substantially lowered sulfur contents. As of 2006, almost all of the petroleum-based diesel fuel available in Europe and North America is of a ULSD type. However, bunker oil is still available, and large marine engines are able to switch between the two types simply by opening and closing the respective valves from two different on-board fuel tanks.

In 2016, the IMO adopted new sulfur-emissions regulations for implementation by larger ships beginning in January 2020.

Of total global air emissions, marine shipping accounts for 18 to 30 percent of the nitrogen oxides and 9% of the sulfur oxides. Sulfur in the air creates acid rain which damages crops and buildings. When inhaled, sulfur is known to cause respiratory problems and even increases the risk of a heart attack. According to Irene Blooming, a spokeswoman for the European environmental coalition Seas at Risk, the fuel used in oil tankers and container ships is high in sulfur and cheaper to buy compared to the fuel used for domestic land use. "A ship lets out around 50 times more sulfur than a lorry per tonne of cargo carried."

Cities in the United States like Long Beach, Los Angeles, Houston, Galveston, and Pittsburgh see some of the heaviest shipping traffic, which has left local officials desperately trying to clean up the air. Increasing trade between the United States and China is helping to increase the number of vessels navigating the Pacific and is exacerbating multiple environmental problems. To maintain the level of growth China is experiencing, large amounts of grain are being shipped to China. The numbers of shipments are expected to continue increasing.

In contrast to sulfur emissions (which depend on the fuel used), nitrous oxide emissions are primarily a function of combustion temperature. As air contains over 70% nitrogen by volume, some of it will react with oxygen during combustion. Given that those reactions are endothermic, a higher amount of nitrous oxides will be produced at higher combustion temperatures. However, other pollutants, particularly unburned or partially burnt hydrocarbons (also known as hyperfine particulates or soot), will be more common at lower combustion temperatures, so there is a trade-off between nitrogen oxides and soot.

Other than replacing ambient air with pure oxygen or some other oxidizing agent, the only ways to significantly reduce the nitrogen oxide emissions are via passing flue gasses through a catalytic converter and/or diesel exhaust fluid treatment, whereby an aqueous solution of urea reacts with the nitrous oxides in the flue gas to produce nitrogen, carbon dioxide and water. However, both those options add cost and weight. Furthermore, the urea in diesel exhaust fluid is usually derived from fossil fuels, and therefore it is not carbon neutral.

A third option entails the use of wet scrubbers that essentially spray seawater through the exhaust column as it is pumped through a chamber. Depending on the detailed engineering-design attributes of the wet scrubber, these devices can wash out the sulfur oxides, soot and nitrogen oxides from the engine exhaust, thus leaving a sludge that contains soot and various acidic compounds (or neutralized compounds, if alkaline substances are mixed in with the scrubbing liquid beforehand). This material can then be either treated via an on-board device (closed-loop system), or it can simply be dumped overboard (open-loop system). The discharged material has been shown to harm marine life, especially in nearshore settings.

In a recent study, the future of ship emissions has been investigated and reported that the growth of carbon dioxide emissions do not change with most common alternatives such as ultra-low-sulfur diesel (ULSD) or liquefied natural gas (LNG) as well as growing volume of methane emission due to methane slip through the LNG supply-chain. Methane is a much more powerful greenhouse gas than carbon dioxide per unit volume, and is only slowly broken down in the environment by various chemical, photochemical and biological processes.

In inland-waters-based applications where sulfur cannot (fully) be removed from the fuel before combustion (desulfurization), flue gas scrubbing is commonly employed. However, this would add weight and cost on ships and produce a further waste stream (usually calcium sulfate if flue gases are scrubbed by being passed through calcium hydroxide solution) which would have to be disposed of, adding yet further cost. In addition, calcium hydroxide commonly being produced by calcination of calcium carbonate releases yet more carbon dioxide into the atmosphere. While this stream is comparatively small in relation to carbon-dioxide emissions caused by combustion of fossil fuels, it needs to be taken into account as well, as part of a complete life-cycle assessment.

==== Localized air pollution ====
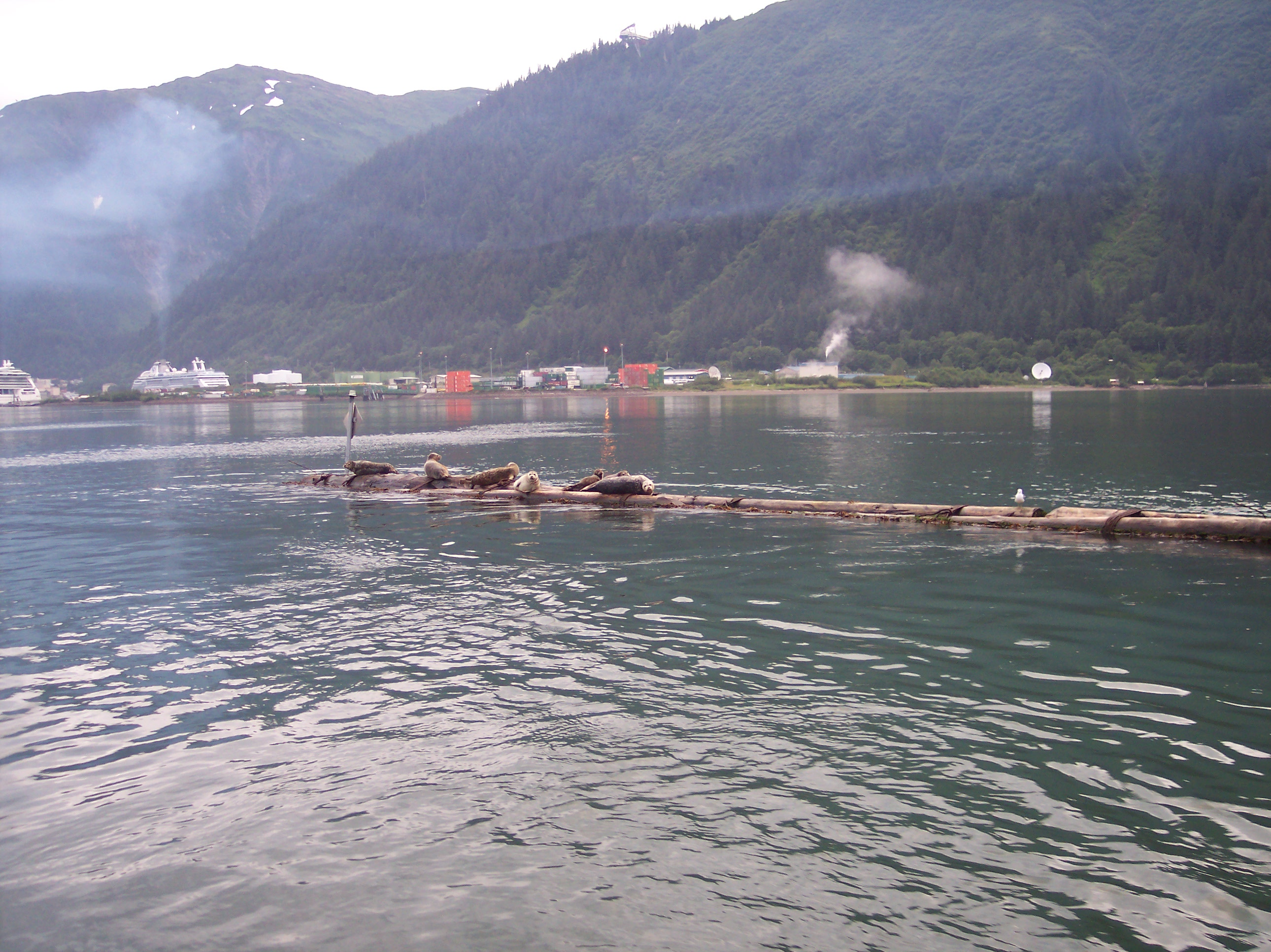
Cruise ship haze over Juneau, Alaska

One source of environmental stresses on maritime vessels recently has come from states and localities, as they assess the contribution of commercial marine vessels to regional air quality problems when ships are docked at port. For instance, large marine diesel engines are believed to contribute 7 percent of mobile source nitrogen oxide emissions in Baton Rouge and New Orleans, Louisiana. Ships can also have a significant impact in areas without large commercial ports: they contribute about 37 percent of total area nitrogen oxide emissions in the Santa Barbara, California area, and that percentage is expected to increase in future years. Again, there is little cruise-industry specific data on this issue. They comprise only a small fraction of the world shipping fleet, but cruise ship emissions may exert significant impacts on a local scale in specific coastal areas that are visited repeatedly. Shipboard incinerators also burn large volumes of garbage, plastics, and other waste, producing ash that must be disposed of. Incinerators may release toxic emissions as well.

In 2005, MARPOL Annex VI came into force to combat this problem. As such cruise ships now employ CCTV monitoring on the smokestacks as well as recorded measuring via opacity meter while some are also using clean burning gas turbines for electrical loads and propulsion in sensitive areas.

=== Greenhouse gas emissions ===
Maritime transport accounts for about 3% of all greenhouse gas emissions, primarily carbon dioxide. According to the World Bank, in 2022, the shipping industry's 3% of global greenhouse gas emissions make it "the sixth largest greenhouse gas emitter worldwide, ranking between Japan and Germany."

CO2 Emissions Distribution by Vessel Type, 2012–2023
Year	Tankers	Dry bulk and general cargo	Container	Other
2012	25.04%	28.57%	27.80%	18.59%
2013	24.61%	28.77%	27.47%	19.15%
2014	24.50%	28.87%	27.18%	19.45%
2015	25.03%	28.42%	26.99%	19.56%
2016	25.31%	28.33%	26.83%	19.53%
2017	25.62%	28.06%	26.91%	19.41%
2018	25.76%	27.42%	27.09%	19.73%
2019	26.41%	27.22%	25.84%	20.53%
2020	27.38%	28.13%	25.35%	19.14%
2021	26.71%	28.28%	26.13%	18.88%
2022	27.28%	27.56%	25.35%	19.81%
2023	28.55%	27.52%	24.03%	19.90%
The group "other" includes vehicles and roll-on/roll-off ships, passenger ships, offshore ships and service and miscellaneous ships.

==== Decarbonization of shipping ====
The decarbonization of shipping is an ongoing goal to reduce greenhouse gas emissions from shipping to net-zero by or around 2050, championed by the International Maritime Organization (IMO). As of 2025 maritime transport emits 3% of global greenhouse gas (GHG) but that could rise to 10% by 2050. The IMO has an initial strategy that includes lowering, or limiting, the combustion of fossil fuels for power and propulsion to limit emission of carbon dioxide (CO_{2}); development of alternative fuels such as green ammonia, hydrogen, and biofuels to reduce reliance on fossil fuels, and adopting digital technologies to increase vessel efficiency; and reducing emissions by 40% by 2030. However in 2025 proposed IMO regulations aiming to reduce the GHG intensity of ship fuel, and the world's first global mandatory charge on GHG emissions (the IMO Net-Zero Framework), were blocked by the United States and Saudi Arabia.

There is a trend in shipping to transition to Liquid Natural Gas (LNG) with claims of associated GHG reductions. Environmental groups (e.g., Stand.earth and the Clean Arctic Alliance) and some climate scientists warn that LNG could be a "climate shipwreck." The biggest concern is unburned methane escaping into the atmosphere referred to as methane slip. One study by Stand.earth states Methane is roughly 80 times more potent than CO_{2} as a greenhouse gas over a 20-year period.

Ammonia is an option for shippers, and when produced with renewable energy, it can reduce carbon dioxide emissions. The shipping sector makes up 3 percent of global carbon dioxide emissions. Ammonia produced using sustainable fuels is more expensive than LNG, but as the cost of producing clean energy falls, it is becoming more affordable. The International Maritime Organization wants the sector to be net-zero by 2050.

== Oil spills ==
Oil spills are the most commonly known form of environmental pollution by ships.

=== Types and causes of oil spills ===
The economically important shipping industry contributes heavily to the oceans' oil pollution. The marine transportation of oil is particularly risky. Soto-Onate & Caballero (2017), therefore, regard oil spills as a significant negative externality of the economy. Oil spills can be categorized as accidental or intentional.

==== Accidental oil spills ====
Accidental spills are the result of e.g. ship collisions, fires or groundings. Various partly interrelated factors are underlying causes of these accidents. These include human factors such as discipline, and competence of the crew, management by e.g. the shipping company, ship factors such as technical installations, and environmental factors like difficult to navigate areas.

==== Intentional oil spills ====
Intentional spills can be operational. Although less studied and publicized, they make up for more marine pollution. They usually involve not properly managing oily residues or ballast and bilge water by e.g. illegally cleaning the ship's tanks at sea. It is regarded as a way for ship operators to cut costs by not complying with international conventions. Moreover, it is common to also classify minor spills caused by human error and negligence as intentional.

=== Spatial distribution and frequency of oil spills ===
Oil spills are not restricted to certain regions but can occur globally. Nevertheless, studies have shown that oil spill density is positively correlated with shipping density, i.e. spills more often occur where maritime traffic is intense – along major shipping lanes, coastlines, and close to ports or oil infrastructure. This is related to a higher risk of accidents. Intentional spills are, moreover, likely to occur in 'clusters' and beyond national jurisdiction to avoid detection or because of inadequate reception facilities in ports. Lastly, zones characterized by war or political instability experience more oil spills.

While scholars highlight the decrease of oil spills over the last decades, oil pollution from shipping remains an environmental risk. In the past decades several major accidental spills like the grounding of Exxon Valdez (1989), which despite considerable rescue efforts substantially harmed the marine environment off of Alaska, or the Sanchi oil spill (2018) – "the most serious and most polluting oil tanker accident [in] the 21st century" – occurred. Concerning the number of intentional oil spills, a high number of unknown cases is expected. It is estimated that intentional oil spills make up for 45%, while accidents only contribute to 8% of marine oil pollution.

Currently, various trends could increase the risk of oil spills again. Among these are the growing oil trade and bigger tankers. Even though not studied conclusively, climate change might, moreover, make accidental spills more likely because of more intense and frequent storms at sea and melting ice. Lastly, the growing problem of shadow fleets transporting oil on sub-standard, old, and anonymously owned vessels without proper safety, insurance and compliance standards, and engaging in dangerous ship-to-ship transfers exacerbate the risk of oil spills.

=== Impact of oil spills ===
Oil spills are regarded as devastating and irreversible for marine ecosystems and biodiversity. Polycyclic aromatic hydrocarbons (PAHs), which are in crude oil, are toxic for marine life. The difficult to clean PAHs can remain in the marine environment and sediment for years. PAHs can hinder the marine life's development, reproduction, and resistance to diseases. Affected are, among others, fish, seabirds, mammals, invertebrate communities, and reefs. The impact depends on various factors: Oil spills by oil tankers will have substantially larger environmental consequences than those of other ships. Moreover, currents, the geographical area and its ecological sensitivity, the type and amount of spilled oil, weather conditions and seasons, e.g. breeding seasons, influence how devastating the individual oil spill is. The exact quantification of impacts, the assessment of long-term consequences of oil spills and the measurement of impacts of intentional spills remain difficult. Even though less oil is released at once in the case of the latter, their continuous nature and frequency translate into substantial consequences, particularly in sensitive areas.

=== Governance of oil spills ===
Oil Spills are governed by a hierarchical and multi-level system formed by various actors. The evolution of the system can be divided into three phases: The first phase (1950s-1970s) laid the foundation for a governance system. Starting in 1954 with the International Convention for the Prevention of Pollution at Sea by Oil (OILPOL54), a variety of technical and institutional measures were adopted. In the second phase (1980s-1990s), this system was strengthened, and in the third phase (21st century) supplemented. Major oil spills such as Torrey Canyon (1967), Exxon Valdez (1989), Erika (1999), and Prestige (2002) were crucial in this process. They revealed defects of the system and led to improvements.

==== Oil spill management ====
Oil spill management is conducted and influenced by a variety of actors. At the international level, the United Nations (UN) agencies International Maritime Organization (IMO) and International Labor Organization (ILO) are prominent. The IMO is regarded as the main intergovernmental organization in the maritime domain. It is e.g. involved through IMO conventions such as MARPOL 73/78, guidance documents such as technical papers about oil spill response, and by supporting the implementation efforts in developing countries.

However, regional and national levels are also important in oil spill governance: State and supranational actors influenced the system's evolution. The United States of America (USA) and the European Union (EU) are credited with pushing international regulation, concerning e.g. compensation and the phasing out of single hull tankers, forward by lobbying in the IMO or taking unilateral action. Balances of power between countries play an important role in how the system develops.

Moreover, states take on important tasks within the current framework. They are e.g. responsible for the implementation of the international regulations at the national level. Specific responsibilities apply to flag, port, and coastal states.

Regional organizations and cooperation are also part of oil spill governance. The latter can aim at monitoring, capacity building, and national preparedness. Examples for regional organizations are the European Maritime Safety Agency (EMSA), the Helsinki Commission (HELCOM), the UN Environment Program (UNEP) Regional Seas, the European Sea Ports Organisation (ESPO), and the Northwest Pacific Action Plan Marine Environment Emergency Preparedness and Response Regional Activity Centre (NOWPAP MERRAC).

Lastly, non-state actors influence oil spill management. The oil and shipping industry have contributed concerning Research and Development (R&D) and regulations. Moreover, ports have created proactive frameworks and initiatives such as EcoPorts. Private actors are also active in data and monitoring efforts. Non-state actors in the field, moreover, include non-governmental organizations (NGOs) such as Sea Alarm and the World Wildlife Fund (WWF).

A variety of governance measures concerning oil spills exist. They represent a mixture of institutional and technical, as well as incentive-based and command-and-control measures, which address prevention, in-process, and ex-post management. Several international conventions contain regulations on the international level. Regulations aimed at prevention of oil spills are included in OILPOL54 and particularly its successor the International Convention for the Prevention of Pollution from Ships (MARPOL73/78), which "remains the primary legal instrument for the prevention of pollution from ships". Moreover, the International Convention for the Safety of Life at Sea (SOLAS74) and the International Convention on Maritime Search and Rescue (SAR) contain preventative measures. The can be institutional such as tanker equipment inspection, oil pollution discharge requirements, and a ship reporting system or technical. Examples of the latter are top loading, the inert gas system, segregated ballast tanks, crude oil tank cleaning and a stability meter. The most salient regulation in that regard, however, is the command-and-control requirement to build new tankers with a double hull structure and to phase-out single hull tankers to lower the risk of accidental spills, which was agreed upon in the amendment to MARPOL in 1992.

International Conventions also address in-process management of oil spills. SOLAS74 for example requires a fixed deck foam system in case of fires, and emergency towing arrangements as technical measures. The International Convention on Salvage (1989), furthermore, introduces salvage compensation for those coming to the rescue in case of accidents. In case of oil spills, it includes exceptions to the 'no cure, no pay' principle, that would only allow for compensation if the rescue was successful. The International Convention on Oil Pollution Preparedness, Response and Co-Operation (OPRC) by the IMO promotes oil spill emergency preparedness and international cooperation.

International conventions also concern ex-post regulations. The Nairobi Convention on the Removal of Wrecks (2007) regulates shipwreck removal to reduce environmental impacts. To protect victims of oil spills an international compensation and liability system was established by the International Convention on Civil Liability for Oil Pollution Damage (CLC) and International Convention on the Establishment of an International Fund for Compensation for Oil Pollution Damage (FC). The CLC defines shipowners as the sole and strict liable party in case of oil spills, puts limits of liability in place, and requires compulsory insurance. The FC creates a fund financed by the oil industry that steps in when the compensation by the CLC is not enough. This system has been adjusted and expanded over time. Scholars argue that these measures, while primarily ex-post management tools, can also be seen as preventative, because of e.g. requirements by insurance companies.

===== OPA90 and Erika I, II, III =====
After the Exxon Valdez spill (1989), the USA established its own comprehensive system with the Oil Pollution Act (OPA90). It, among others, featured a requirement for double-hulled tankers in US ports even before the IMO addressed this in its MARPOL amendment (1992). Moreover, it set up a compensation and liability system. The latter is regarded as stricter than the international CLC/FC system because of, among others, higher limitations, easier lost limitations rights, and holding other parties than the shipowner liable.

The three legislative packages Erika I, II, and III, agreed upon by the EU after the Erika (1999) and the Prestige (2002) oil spills, are a further example of comprehensive governance to prevent and mitigate accidental oil spills. It concerns, among others, Port State Control (PSC), compensation and liability, as well as ship monitoring.

===== Port state control =====
There are various approaches centering around ports: PSC "has become the most important measure". The Paris Memorandum of Understanding (MoU) established a regional PSC system in Europe and Canada to inspect foreign vessels. In 2011, the system shifted from random ship selections to risk-based ones targeting high-risk ships, thereby incentivizing ship operators to be classified as low-risk. Ports, moreover, need to have adequate reception facilities, and in the EU, moreover, a waste reception and handling plan, so that vessels can dispose of their oil waste there. In ports of the Baltic Sea, the "No-Special-Fee" system was agreed upon. By not charging specifically for the use of port facilities, the system aims at incentivizing disposing oily residues at the proper facilities instead of carrying out intentional oil spills at sea to cut costs. These initiatives such as PSCs do not only have local but also extraterritorial regulatory effects.

===== Monitoring =====
Enabled by technological advances monitoring and surveillance with flights or satellite technology can be used to identify and reduce intentional as well as accidental spills. Moreover, monitoring and data collection is advised to facilitate emergency responses as well as compensation and potentially the identification and conviction of perpetrators. While monitoring of intentional spills is no longer a focus of the IMO, satellite monitoring is e.g. still practiced by EMSA or the USA and Canada. Monitoring efforts are more successful, when states are vulnerable because of shipping lanes in their territorial waters or their Exclusive Economic Zone (EEZ), only a limited area needs to be monitored, and only number of states needs to be involved.

===== Contingency planning and emergency training =====
To prepare for oil spill emergencies contingency planning and emergency training are utilized. Contingency plans determine, among others, risk assessments, operational procedures and responsibilities in case of oil spill emergencies. States furthered their efforts in contingency planning in response to the OPRC. The IMO supports these efforts. Contingency planning needs to be adjusted to the specific national context. Concerning the Western Indian Ocean, the Western Indian Ocean Island Oil Spill Contingency Planning from 1998-2006 for example aimed at preparing emergency responses by island states like Mauritius. In contingency planning and risk assessment, oil spill models can be used.

The established management measures are credited for the reduction of oil spills. Despite recognizing the success of these measures, several shortcomings and necessary improvements have been pointed out:

Some of the criticism is related to specific measures such as the CLC/FC. Among others, this critique echoes that holding other parties than the shipowner liable is not possible, its liability limits are too low to cover the costs of oil spills, and environmental damages are often not valued. Scholars, therefore, recommend moving to an international system closer aligned with OPA90. Another example is the criticism of contingency planning as insufficient, often too standardized, and lacking valuable information.

Moreover, the system's partly voluntary status and lacking enforcement is criticized. States that are not part of the international system are difficult to include in oil spill governance. Moreover, the use of Flags of Convenience (FoC) is problematic due to their low safety standards. Zhang et al. (2021) recommend changing the ship registry and strengthening PSC to address this problem. Further and joint monitoring as well as improved and consistent open-access data collection can be a way to counter enforcement gaps concerning intentional spills.

The heterogeneity of countries is another obstacle to effective management. Different national contexts translate into varying national interests and stances towards stricter regulation. According to Hassler (2016), to achieve proactive states it is crucial that the state's cost-benefit analysis is positive. The national context is also prominent concerning capacities: States with lower capabilities, know-how and experience perform worse in all stages of oil spill management such as flight surveillance, emergency response and compensation. Even though capacity building could theoretically help, the Wakashio oil spill (2020) showed that these initiatives were not sufficient. They are hindered by their focus on short term and technical action, fragmentation, and training difficulties. Other scholars emphasize the need for a greater focus on human and management factors, e.g. through training, supervision, and awareness building. Lastly, decarbonization is proposed as a way to reduce the risk of oil spills.

== Wastewater ==
Blackwater is sewage, wastewater from toilets and medical facilities, which can contain harmful bacteria, pathogens, viruses, intestinal parasites, and harmful nutrients. Discharges of untreated or inadequately treated sewage can cause bacterial and viral contamination of fisheries and shellfish beds, producing risks to public health. Nutrients in sewage, such as nitrogen and phosphorus, promote excessive algal blooms, which consumes oxygen in the water and can lead to fish kills and destruction of other aquatic life.

Greywater is wastewater from the sinks, showers, galleys, laundry, and cleaning activities aboard a ship. It can contain a variety of pollutant substances, including fecal coliforms, detergents, oil and grease, metals, organic compounds, petroleum hydrocarbons, nutrients, food waste, medical and dental waste. Sampling done by EPA and the state of Alaska found that untreated greywater from cruise ships can contain pollutants at variable strengths and that it can contain levels of fecal coliform bacteria several times greater than is typically found in untreated domestic wastewater. Greywater has potential to cause adverse environmental effects because of concentrations of nutrients and other oxygen-demanding materials, in particular. Greywater is typically the largest source of liquid waste generated by cruise ships (90 to 95 percent of the total). Estimates of greywater range from 110 to 320 liters per day per person, or 330,000 to 960,000 liters per day for a 3,000-person cruise ship.

A large cruise ship (3,000 passengers and crew) generates an estimated 55,000 to 110,000 liters per day of blackwater waste. The cruise line industry dumps 970,000 litres (255,000 US gal) of greywater and 110,000 litres (30,000 US gal) of blackwater into the sea every day.

MARPOL annex IV was brought into force September 2003 limiting untreated sewage discharge to ships travelling at minimum 4 knots and more than 12 nautical miles from the nearest land, so that no visible solids or discoloration in the water are visible. In some areas stricter regional rules apply.

Modern cruise ships are often equipped with a membrane bioreactor type treatment plant for blackwater and greywater, such as G&O, Zenon or Rochem bioreactors which produce near drinkable quality effluent to be re-used in the machinery spaces as technical water.

== Solid waste ==
Solid waste generated on a ship includes glass, paper, cardboard, aluminium and steel cans, and plastics. It can be either non-hazardous or hazardous in nature. Solid waste that enters the ocean may become marine debris, and can then pose a threat to marine organisms, humans, coastal communities, and industries that utilize marine waters. Cruise ships typically manage solid waste by a combination of source reduction, waste minimization, and recycling. However, as much as 75 percent of solid waste is incinerated on board, and the ash typically is discharged at sea, although some is landed ashore for disposal or recycling. Marine mammals, fish, sea turtles, and birds can be injured or killed from entanglement with plastics and other solid waste that may be released or disposed off of cruise ships. On average, each cruise ship passenger generates at least two pounds of non-hazardous solid waste per day. With large cruise ships carrying several thousand passengers, the amount of waste generated in a day can be massive. For a large cruise ship, about 8 tons of solid waste are generated during a one-week cruise. It has been estimated that 24% of the solid waste generated by vessels worldwide (by weight) comes from cruise ships. Most cruise ship garbage is treated on board (incinerated, pulped, or ground up) for discharge overboard. When garbage must be off-loaded (for example, because glass and aluminium cannot be incinerated), cruise ships can put a strain on port reception facilities, which are rarely adequate to the task of serving a large passenger vessel.

=== Plastic Pollution ===
Plastic pollution is a major environmental issue, with over 75% of all marine debris currently consisting of plastic. Approximately 20% of global plastic pollution originates from oceanic sources, with shipping identified as a key contributor.

==== Causes and Sources of Plastic Pollution ====
Plastic pollution in the shipping industry can be categorized into direct discharge pollution and indirect pollution.

===== Direct Discharge Pollution =====
This includes cargo losses and illegal dumping of plastic waste into the ocean.

Cargo Losses

Containers are often lost due to extreme weather, operational errors, and inconsistent securing standards. Such incidents introduce large quantities of debris into the marine environment.

Illegal Dumping

Some vessels violate international regulations by discharging plastic waste directly into the sea.

===== Indirect Pollution =====
Improper waste management during routine operations leads to the disposal of food packaging and other plastic items into the marine environment.

==== Environmental and Ecological Impacts of Plastic Pollution ====
Plastic pollution in the oceans can be classified by size: macroplastic (>20 mm), mesoplastic (5–20 mm), microplastic (<5 mm), and nanoplastic (<1000 nm). These pollutants have significant environmental and ecological impacts.

===== Impacts of Large Plastic Debris =====
Large plastics, such as lost cargo, pose a serious threat to marine life, causing entanglement and ingestion risks that affect mobility, respiration, and feeding behaviors in marine species.

===== Microplastic and Nanoplastic Pollution =====
Larger plastic debris breaks down into smaller particles, transforming into microplastics that disperse throughout the marine environment. Microplastics are also present in cruise ship watewater from laundry and cosmetic products. These microplastics absorb toxic substances, acting as carriers for persistent organic pollutants. By 2014, over 5 trillion plastic particles were floating on the ocean's surface, weighing nearly 270,000 tons. These particles, when ingested by marine organisms, can bioaccumulate, impacting marine ecosystems and potentially affecting human health.

==== Mitigation Efforts and Limitations ====
Efforts to address plastic pollution from shipping involve a multi-level governance framework, engaging international organizations, national governments, businesses, and civil society. However, existing mitigation measures face significant challenges.

===== International Governance Framework =====
Key policies and agreements include the International Convention for the Prevention of Pollution from Ships (MARPOL). Specifically, Annex V (Prevention of Pollution by Garbage from Ships) regulates ship-generated waste management, explicitly prohibiting the direct discharge of plastic waste into the sea. The United Nations Agenda 21 also underscores the importance of controlling shipping pollution.

===== Efforts by National Governments =====
Many countries have implemented marine litter monitoring programs, providing critical data on floating debris, seafloor litter, and litter in marine organisms. These programs support evidence-based policy decisions.

===== Regional Governance Initiatives =====
Regional efforts include the Paris Memorandum of Understanding (MoU), a key framework for preventing shipping-related plastic pollution. It employs Port State Control (PSC) to enforce environmental regulations and reduce plastic discharges. The EU's Marine Strategy Framework Directive (MSFD) mandates reduction of vessel-based litter and supports various marine governance initiatives. In the Arctic, the Arctic Monitoring and Assessment Program (AMAP) specifically addresses microplastic pollution.

===== Technological and Policy Advancements =====
Despite MARPOL's requirement for ports to offer waste reception facilities, many facilities need enhancement to improve plastic waste recycling processes. MSFD also faces limitations in monitoring small and medium-sized plastic pollution, and efforts to improve data collection and impact studies on marine biota are needed. Additionally, improving the design of plastic products, such as developing biodegradable materials, could significantly reduce environmental harm.

== Bilge water ==
On a ship, oil often leaks from engine and machinery spaces or from engine maintenance activities and mixes with water in the bilge, the lowest part of the hull of the ship. Though bilge water is filtered and cleaned before being discharged, oil in even minute concentrations can kill fish or have various sub-lethal chronic effects. Bilge water also may contain solid wastes and pollutants containing high levels of oxygen-demanding material, oil and other chemicals. A typically large cruise ship will generate an average of 8 tonnes of oily bilge water for each 24 hours of operation. To maintain ship stability and eliminate potentially hazardous conditions from oil vapors in these areas, the bilge spaces need to be flushed and periodically pumped dry. However, before a bilge can be cleared out and the water discharged, the oil that has been accumulated needs to be extracted from the bilge water, after which the extracted oil can be reused, incinerated, and/or offloaded in port. If a separator, which is normally used to extract the oil, is faulty or is deliberately bypassed, untreated oily bilge water could be discharged directly into the ocean, where it can damage marine life.

Some shipping companies, including large cruise shipping lines, have sometimes violated regulations by illegally bypassing the onboard oily water separator and discharging untreated oily wastewater. In the US these violations by means of a so-called "magic pipe" have been prosecuted and resulted in large fines, but in other countries enforcement has been mixed.

== International regulation ==
Some of the major international efforts in the form of treaties are the Marine Pollution Treaty, Honolulu, which deals with regulating marine pollution from ships, and the UN Convention on Law of the Sea, which deals with marine species and pollution. Maritime governance from the 1950s up to the 1980s has been characterized by intergovernmental decision-making centralized around the IMO. However, this picture has been changing since the 1980s when regional initiatives in the EU and its member states began to play a larger role, partly due to an increasing dissatisfaction with the lacking regulation and enforcement efforts of the IMO. This has led to a new synergy developing between the EU and the IMO and other regional actors, broadly characterized as a polycentric mode of governance. The polycentric synergy of the EU and IMO has largely been driven by the active and leading role taken by the EU in both implementing and influencing IMO conventions. Four regional initiatives in this context are notable: "the use of special areas in IMO Conventions, the adoption of the Paris Memorandum of Understanding (MoU) on Port State Control, the development of the European Union shipping policy domain and the emergence of market-based initiatives by ports and cargo-owners".

While plenty of local and international regulations have been introduced throughout maritime history, much of the current regulations are considered inadequate. "In general, the treaties tend to emphasize the technical features of safety and pollution control measures without going to the root causes of sub-standard shipping, the absence of incentives for compliance and the lack of enforceability of measures." Where polycentric governance relies on positive relationships between major actors and conventions, one of the largest barriers to an effective environmental regulation of shipping arises from negative relationships between major actors and conventions, where ambiguous or overlapping jurisdictions result in a range of different issues such as a lack of effective enforcement and monitoring, inconsistent and unclear standards, and inadequate supervision resulting in blind spots in the high seas.

Effective regulation of international shipping thus requires more international coordination. If states regulate emissions unilaterally, this leads to an overall increase in net emissions, whereas coordinated and uniform regulation between states reduces net emissions. However, varying patterns of governance are still seen across different ports with the same uniform regulation underscoring the need for policy to also take local and sectoral factors into account, perhaps through tailor-made adaptation measures. The effectiveness of uniform regulation also depends on the use of MRV&E systems, which denote "technologies, policies and administrative processes that monitor, report, verify and enforce compliance with the regulations''. The current enforcement of regulations is lacking, and efforts need to be made to both "strengthen supervision and law enforcement and establish a global monitoring system". The most common problems encountered with international shipping arise from paperwork errors and customs brokers not having the proper information about the items. Cruise ships, for example, are exempt from regulation under the US discharge permit system (NPDES, under the Clean Water Act) that requires compliance with technology-based standards. In the Caribbean, many ports lack proper waste disposal facilities, and many ships dump their waste at sea Due to complexities of shipping trade and the difficulties involved in regulating this business, a comprehensive and generally acceptable regulatory framework on corporate responsibility for reducing GHG emissions is unlikely to be achieved soon. As in the case of negotiations around taxation of shipping fuels, international agreement around uniform regulation has not been reached, resulting instead in a deadlock. Overlaps of decision-making authority between central institutions can pose similar barriers, if central norm conflicts between them are large enough – as in the case of competing principles guiding the United Nations Framework Convention on Climate Change (UNFCCC) and the IMO. The UNFCCC is guided by the principle of Common but Differentiated Responsibilities (CBDR) which holds that since developed countries proportionately have contributed the most in terms of GHG emissions, they also take the largest responsibility for addressing the reduction of these emissions. The IMO in contrast is guided by principles of "non-discrimination and equal treatment and No More Favourable Treatment (NMFT) to all ships irrespective of their flag". This has led to a conflict between central interests, since developed states support the NMFT principle, while developing states support the CBDR principle. The effect of this conflict is that we are left with no clear principle around which to regulate resulting in impeding the "legislation efficiency and consensus".

A 2016 journal article recommends that under current circumstances, it is necessary for states, the shipping industry and global organizations to explore and discuss market-based mechanisms (MBMs) for vessel-sourced GHG emissions reduction. MBMs are part of a broader category of mechanisms working through economic incentives "that provide motivation for the adoption of less environmentally damaging practices", the second most common being "infrastructure investments and informative policies". The most prominent and promising use of economic incentives are market-based measures (MBMs). The two main types of MBMs used are emission trading schemes and fuel levies. Both work through putting a price on GHG emissions providing economic incentives for taxed actors to improve their energy efficiency. However, these improvements are also accompanied by a short-term decline in industry profit. Some argue that the current use of MBMs in the EU Emission Trading Scheme could serve as a window of opportunity to reduce GHG emissions in the shipping sector without placing an unnecessarily high burden on the shipping sector. The challenges standing in the way of this – the "allocation of emissions, carbon leakage, permit allocation, treatment of the great variety in ship type, size and usage, and transaction cost" – are however hard to overcome without global market-based economies. Others incentive-based schemes for achieving decarbonization include pricing schemes or the incentivization of "front-runner ships that implement decarbonization technologies beyond regulations". However, evaluation of current the incentive schemes reveals that the schemes are onerous and only taken up by shipping enterprises or ports to a limited degree. Further, these incentive schemes are not specifically focused on a reduction in GHG emissions and thus do not support decarbonization.

Further, these approaches are not without their critics. Lars Stemmler is critical towards the attitude that both environmental and social consequences of climate change can be mitigated through "ever more efficiencies in shipping". Jason Monios similarly argues that the shipping sector generally operate by a business-as-usual logic based on assumptions of uninterrupted growth where actors must only address "incremental challenges that can be adapted to in a piecemeal fashion". However, the consequences of climate change might instead take place on a disruptive and uncontrollable level, "bringing starvation, destruction, migration disease and war" necessitating much more radical action. While Monios argues that the shipping industry has started to use the rhetoric of a logic of sustainability, the actions of shipping actors are still largely determined by the dominant business-as-usual logic, which block attempts at regulation from the IMO and leads to a loss of trust in and legitimacy of the system. Lastly, When MBMs become the primary means of addressing climate change at sea, Monios argues, this business-as-usual logic is strengthened, since they crowd out non-market norms and render invisible governance alternatives such as direct regulation and supply-side approaches.

== Issues by region ==
=== Asia ===
In 2025, about 80 percent of goods are transported overseas. East Asia, in particular, supports the global economy by providing 42 percent of all global exports. The global demand for concentrated shipping activity in Asian ports has resulted in many environmental concerns. The sheer population density concentrated in Asia's coast also presents concern to address environmental issues in these areas, such as air pollution, water pollution, and noise pollution.

In 2021, 430 million residents lived near major Chinese port cities, including Shanghai, Shenzhen, Tianjin, and Guangzhou. Greater population densities in coastal areas mean pollution in these areas deserves special attention for protecting global health as carbon dioxide, sulfur dioxide, and nitrogen oxides are emitted into the atmosphere. Ocean acidification and eutrophication are also issues of concern for environmental stability and aquatic life.

The global community recognizes that the negative environmental effects of maritime shipping activity must be tackled with international cooperation. The Association of Southeast Asian Nations (ASEAN) has set an ambitious goal for its member countries to be carbon neutral by 2050.

=== European Union ===
- Cruise ship pollution in Europe
- EU Reducing Greenhouse Gas emissions from the shipping sector
- EU Sustainable Shipping Forum (ESSF)
- EC-IMO Energy Efficiency Project. The 4-year project aims to establish Maritime Technology Cooperation Centres in 5 regions: Africa, Asia, the Caribbean, Latin America and the Pacific. Through technical assistance and capacity-building, the centres will promote the uptake of low carbon technologies and operations in maritime transport in the less developed countries in the respective region. This will also support the implementation of the internationally agreed energy efficiency rules and standards (EEDI and SEEMP).
- MRV Monitoring, reporting and verification of CO2 emissions from large ships using EU ports

=== United Kingdom ===
- Merchant Shipping Act 1995
- Merchant Shipping (Pollution) Act 2006

=== United States ===
It is expected that, (from 2004) "...shipping traffic to and from the United States is projected to double by 2020." However, many shipping companies and port operators in North America (Canada and the United States) have adopted the Green Marine Environmental Program to limit operational impacts on the environment.

- Act to Prevent Pollution from Ships
- American Bureau of Shipping
- Cruise ship pollution in the United States
- National Oil and Hazardous Substances Contingency Plan
- Oil Pollution Act of 1990
- Regulation of ship pollution in the United States

== See also ==
- Bottom paint
- Classification society (technical standards NGO)
- Convention on the Prevention of Marine Pollution by Dumping of Wastes and Other Matter
- Environmental impact of transport
- Environmental threats to the Great Barrier Reef
- GREEN Cell Shipping
- Hydrogen-powered ship
- International Association of Classification Societies
- List of environmental issues
- Marine debris
- Marine fuel management
- Maritime environmental crime
- Mobility transition
- North Pacific Gyre
- Oil spill
- Particle (ecology)
- Shipping route
- Tributyltin
- Wave power ship
- Wind-powered vehicle
- Windmill ship
- Zero emission vehicle
