= Fundo =

Fundo may refer to:

- Llazar Fundo, Albanian Communist, later social-democratic journalist and writer
- Fundo Island, an island of Tanzania's Zanzibar Archipelago
- Latifundium, or fundo, a type of landed estate in Portuguese and Spanish colonial territories

== See also ==
- Fundo River (disambiguation)
- Fund (disambiguation)
- Fondo (disambiguation)
