= Clean Boating Act of 2008 =

United States law

- Long title: An Act to amend the Federal Water Pollution Control Act to address certain discharges incidental to the normal operation of a recreational vessel
- Acronyms (colloquial): CBA
- Enacted by: the 110th United States Congress

Citations
- Public law: 110-288
- Statutes at Large: 122 Stat. 2650

Codification
- Acts amended: Federal Water Pollution Control Act
- Titles amended: 33 U.S.C.: Navigable Waters
- U.S.C. sections created: 33 U.S.C. § 1322(o)
- U.S.C. sections amended: 33 U.S.C. § 1342, 33 U.S.C. § 1362

Legislative history
- Introduced in the Senate as S. 2766 by Bill Nelson (D–FL) on March 13, 2008; Passed the Senate on 22 July, 2008; Passed the House on 22 July, 2008; Signed into law by President George W. Bush on 2008-07-29

The Clean Boating Act of 2008 (CBA) is a United States law that requires recreational vessels to implement best management practices to control pollution discharges. The law exempts these vessels from requirements to obtain a discharge permit under the Clean Water Act (i.e. they are exempt from coverage under the EPA Vessels General Permit).

The CBA amended the Clean Water Act (CWA) and directs the U.S. Environmental Protection Agency (EPA) to develop performance standard regulations. The regulations will not apply to sewage discharges from recreational vessels, which are already regulated under the CWA. (See Marine sanitation device.) The CBA designated the U.S. Coast Guard as the enforcing agency.

In 2011 EPA conducted public meetings to obtain public comment about developing CBA regulations. As of 2020, EPA has not announced a schedule for issuing the regulations.

== See also ==
- Regulation of ship pollution in the United States
