= Marine sanitation device =

Treats or retains sewage to prevent wastewater discharge into the marine environment

A marine sanitation device (MSD) is a piece of machinery or a mechanical system that is dedicated to treat, process, and/or store raw, untreated sewage that can accumulate onboard water vessels. It does not refer to portable devices such as portable toilets.

== Available MSD types ==
In the United States, the Environmental Protection Agency (EPA) sets performance standards for marine sanitation devices, and the U.S. Coast Guard (USCG) issues regulations governing the design, construction, certification, installation and operation of MSDs.

USCG has certified three kinds of marine sanitation devices.

=== Type I ===
A Type I MSD has a flow-through discharge design. The sewage is broken down and processed through the use of chlorination and/or maceration. The bacteria count per one hundred milliliters of water must be less than one thousand. Discharges from Type I MSDs must not have evident floating solids. Type I MSDs also rely heavily on chlorination and maceration to break down solids and kill any bacteria present.

=== Type II ===
Type II MSDs are similar to Type I, with a flow-through discharge. However, the sewage is broken up through the use of aerobic bacteria or some other biological digestion process. The bacteria count found in one hundred milliliters of water produced from this system cannot be greater than two hundred.

=== Type III ===
Type III MSDs have a different design compared to Type I and Type II. It typically consists of a large storage tank that holds treated or untreated sewage that is held and released when the vessel returns to port. In port, the Type III discharge is transferred to a wastewater treatment facility. However, Type III MSDs can also consist of a holding tank with advanced technologies, including but not limited to incineration, recirculation, and composting. The residuals are not discharged to water, but are transferred when the vessel is in port.

== Laws and regulations ==
Under IMO, or International Maritime Organization, MARPOL 73/78, also known as the International Convention for the Prevention of Pollution From Ships ("Marpol" is short for marine pollution and 73/78 short for the years 1973 and 1978.) There are a total of six annexes that compose Marpol. Annex IV deals with the pollution of sewage by ships. In Annex IV, there are a total of 11 regulations regarding the laws and regulations surrounding sewage discharge and treatment plants on board. It wasn't until the United States implemented Act to Prevent Pollution from Ships.

=== US regulations ===
In the US, no vessel with a toilet on board may be operated unless there is a Coast Guard-approved MSD aboard the vessel which is fully functioning. The Clean Water Act (CWA) prohibits the discharge of untreated sewage into waters of the United States. There are also restrictions on vessel manufactures and operators. Manufacturers may not sell any vessel equipped with toilet facilities unless there is an operable Type II or Type III MSD, or an operable Type I device on a vessel that is less than 65 feet (20 m). No person may operate the vessel unless there is an operable Type II or Type III MSD or an operable Type I device. If the vessel is in a water body the discharge of untreated or treated sewage is prohibited by EPA, the vessel operator must secure the device.

==== No-Discharge Zones ====
The CWA has another means of addressing sewage discharges, through establishment of no-discharge zones (NDZs) for vessel sewage. A state may completely prohibit the discharge of both treated and untreated sewage from all vessels with installed toilets into some or all waters over which it has jurisdiction (up to 3 miles (4.8 km) from land). To create a no-discharge zone to protect waters from sewage discharges by vessels, the state must apply to EPA under one of three categories.

1. NDZ based on the need for higher level of water quality, and the state demonstrates that adequate pumpout facilities for safe and sanitary removal and treatment of sewage from all vessels are reasonably available. As of 2017, this category of designation has been used for 72 areas representing part or all of the waters of 26 states, including a number of inland states.
2. NDZ for special waters found to have a particular environmental importance (e.g., to protect environmentally sensitive areas such as shellfish beds or coral reefs); it is not necessary for the state to show pumpout availability. This category of designation has been used twice (state waters within the Florida Keys National Marine Sanctuary and the Boundary Waters Canoe area of Minnesota).
3. NDZ to prohibit the discharge of sewage into waters that are drinking water intake zones; it is not necessary for the state to show pumpout availability. This category of designation has been used to protect part of the Hudson River in New York.

==== Solid waste ====
Ship discharges of solid waste are governed by two laws. Title I of the Marine Protection, Research, and Sanctuaries Act (MPRSA) applies to cruise ships and other vessels and makes it illegal to transport garbage from the United States for the purpose of dumping it into ocean waters without a permit or to dump any material transported from a location outside the United States into U.S. territorial seas or the contiguous zone (within 12 nautical miles (22 km) from shore) or ocean waters. EPA is responsible for issuing permits that regulate the disposal of materials at sea (except for dredged material disposal, for which the U.S. Army Corps of Engineers is responsible). Beyond waters that are under U.S. jurisdiction, no MPRSA permit is required for a ship to discharge solid waste. The routine discharge of effluent incidental to the propulsion of vessels is explicitly exempted from the definition of dumping in the MPRSA.

The Act to Prevent Pollution from Ships (APPS) and its regulations implements U.S.-ratified provisions of MARPOL. APPS prohibits the discharge of all garbage within 3 nautical miles (5.6 km) of shore, certain types of garbage within 12 nautical miles (22 km) offshore, and plastic anywhere. It applies to all vessels, whether seagoing or not, regardless of flag, operating in U.S. navigable waters and the Exclusive Economic Zone (EEZ). It is administered by the Coast Guard, which carries out inspection programs to insure the adequacy of port facilities to receive offloaded solid waste.

== History ==
EPA first issued its MSD regulations in 1976 under CWA authority. The intent of the law is to prevent the spread of disease, keep the oxygen content in water bodies at a healthy level, and to maintain healthy waters in regards to appearance.

== Treatment ==
The purpose of the MSD is to treat the incoming blackwater and graywater that accumulates on board a floating vessel. Graywater is water that drains directly from a shower, sink, or machinery located in the scullery. Normally, graywater is discharged directly overboard since it is not technically considered sewage and not damaging to the environment. However, in most ports around the world, discharge of fluids is strictly prohibited. To compensate for this situation, graywater piping is rerouted to the MSD. Blackwater is another word for sewage or human body wastes and wastes from toilets. According to the international maritime organization or the IMO, untreated sewage cannot be discharged overboard unless it is 12 nautical miles from the nearest land. Due to regulations issued by the IMO and the United States Maritime Administration (MARAD), every ship must have an approved marine sanitation device aboard their ship. Blackwater is therefore treated through a process that utilizes chlorination and/or biological treatment before being discharged overboard.

=== Biological treatment ===
In Type II MSDs, sewage is broken down through the use of a natural biological component. Usually this biological component is aerobic bacteria that occur in the media tank. Even though the sewage can have some aerobic bacteria naturally, a majority of the bacteria population is grown on mediums located within the media tank. Since aerobic bacteria require oxygen to live, some form of air pump is necessary to provide sufficient oxygen for the bacteria. This air pump can be a fan or roots blower connected to the tank. By providing sufficient air, most of the smell caused by sewage and anaerobic bacteria is eliminated.

=== Chlorination and maceration ===
In Type I MSDs, sewage is broken down usually through the use of chlorination and/ or maceration. The chlorination process is usually done within a large tank sometimes referred to as the contact chamber. By adding chlorine to the sewage, the effluent is sanitized and it is discharged from the MSD. The maceration process aboard ships is usually done using some form of machinery to crush and pulverize the incoming sewage. However, since a large portion of bacteria is still present in the macerated sewage, the sewage is considered untreated still. Due to this circumstance, maceration machinery is usually paired with some form of chlorination process in the same system. Very few places around the world allow the discharge of untreated sewage from a maceration process.

=== Advanced water treatment ===
Some vessels are equipped with advanced water treatment plants, also called Advanced Wastewater Purification (AWP) systems, instead of traditional MSDs. They are most commonly found on ships that sail in Alaskan waters and sometimes work in parallel with an onboard MSD. Royal Caribbean International, for example, havsinstalled AWP systems on its ships which treat wastewater using advanced technology. Royal Caribbean AWP systems include three types of water purification systems: Scanship, Hydroxyl/Headworks and Navalis. Scanship and Hydroxyl use biological treatment while the Navalis system primarily uses advanced oxidation and filtration methods. Scanship and Hydroxyl systems use bacterial to consume the waste while also utilizing a chemical in order to break down and remove solids. Scanship and Hydroxyl systems are very similar to water treatment plants based on shore. This involves a simple five stage process. The first stage involves a prefilter where screens removes heavy and noticeable solids from the waste influent. Then the wastewater is passed through a biological reactor which uses beneficial bacteria to further break down any solids. Next the influent is pumped through a flotation unit which removes floatable waste. Afterwards, the clean water is passed through polishing filters which make the water even cleaner. The last and final stage involves an ultraviolet light reactor which disinfects the water. The final product may then be dried, incinerated, stored, or discharged at sea with respect to international regulations.

The Navalis AWP system utilizes a seven-stage process to treat wastewater. The first stage involves wastewater entering the shaker screens which removes any noticeable solids. Then the wastewater is passed through an AET Roughing Reactor which help with chemical equalization and load. Then the influent is treated by a three-stage particle removal process which involve chemical flocculation, Hydraulic Separation, Tubular Filtration, and Ultra Filtration membranes. The waste influent is then passed through Oxidation Reactors which serve to oxidize pollutants and aid the production of carbon dioxide gas and water. The seventh and final stage consists of a powerful Ultraviolet Reactor in which the ozonated water is broken down into oxygen compounds that provide further treatment of the water. The leftover solids are then oxidized which provide safe bio-disposal or land based discharge if needed.

== See also ==
- Cruise ship pollution in the United States
- Regulation of ship pollution in the United States
