= Fund =

Fund may refer to:

- Funding is the act of providing resources, usually in form of money, or other values such as effort or time, for a project, a person, a business, or any other private or public institution
  - The process of soliciting and gathering funds is known as fundraising
- An investment fund, often referred to as a fund
  - Hedge fund, an investment vehicle open only to investors who are qualified in some way
  - Mutual fund, a specific type of investment fund which pools money from many investors to purchase securities
  - Sovereign wealth fund, a state-owned investment fund
- Fund accounting, an accounting system used for recording resource use under limitations imposed by a donor or regulator
- Meir Fund, American rabbi
- FUND or FUND92, short names for the International Convention on the Establishment of an International Fund for Compensation for Oil Pollution Damage of 1992.
