= Fondo (disambiguation) =

Fondo is a comune (municipality) in Trentino in the northern Italian region Trentino-Alto Adige/Südtirol,.

Fondo may also refer to:

- Fondo (Barcelona Metro), a Barcelona Metro station in the municipality of Santa Coloma de Gramenet, Spain
- Fondo (Traversella), a human settlement in Traversella, Italy
- Gran Fondo, type of long-distance road cycling ride originating in Italy in 1970

== See also ==
- Fundo (disambiguation)
