= Regulation of ship pollution in the United States =

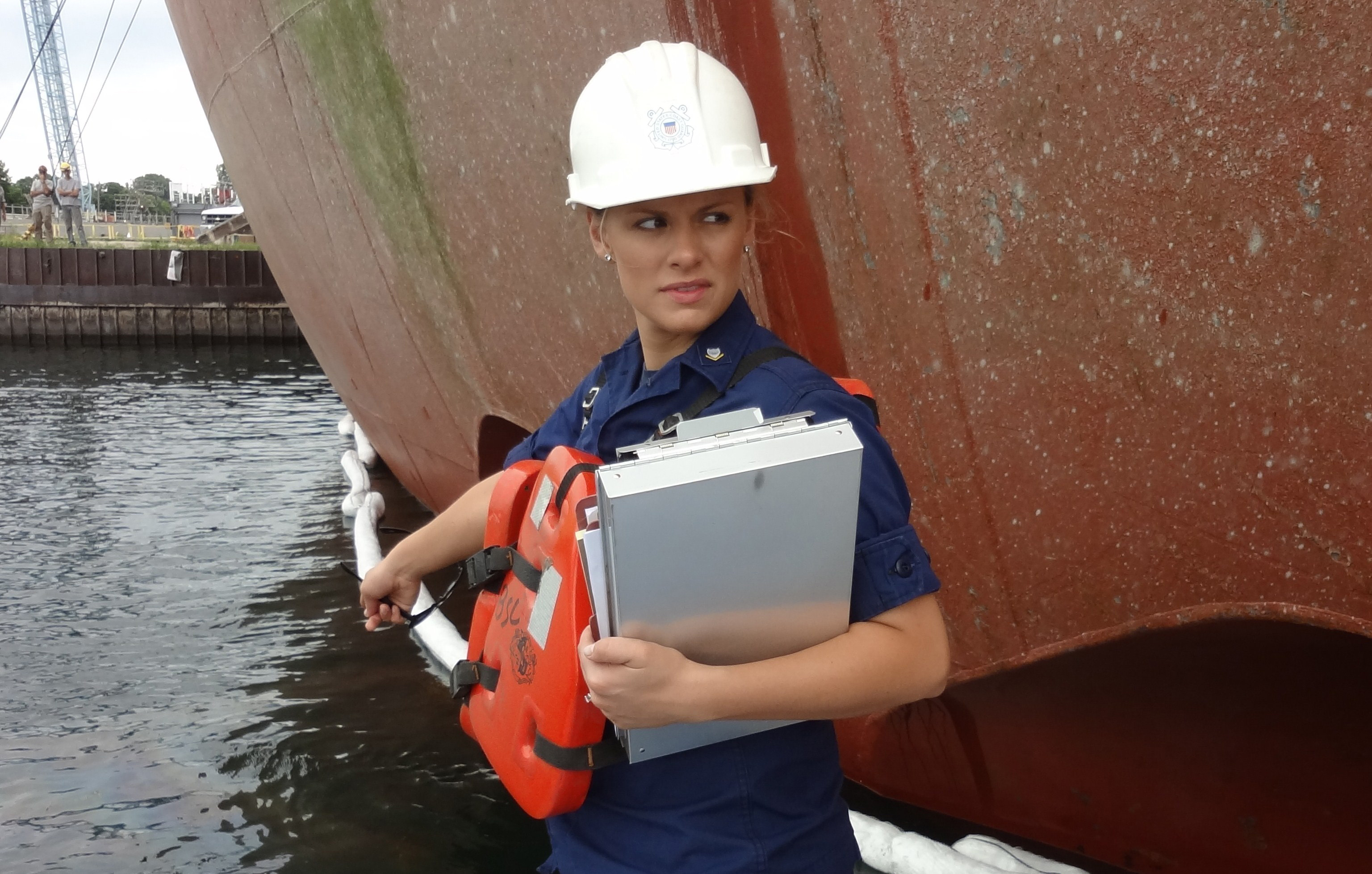
A marine safety technician responds to a reported oil sheen in the Sturgeon Bay Ship Canal in Wisconsin.

In the United States, several federal agencies and laws have some jurisdiction over pollution from ships in U.S. waters. States and local government agencies also have responsibilities for ship-related pollution in some situations.

== International laws and regulations ==
MARPOL 73/78 (the "International Convention for the Prevention of Pollution From Ships") is one of the most important treaties regulating pollution from ships. Six Annexes of the Convention cover the various sources of pollution from ships and provide an overarching framework for international objectives. In the U.S., the Convention is implemented through the Act to Prevent Pollution from Ships (APPS). Under the provisions of the Convention, the United States can take direct enforcement action under U.S. laws against foreign-flagged ships when pollution discharge incidents occur within U.S. jurisdiction. When incidents occur outside U.S. jurisdiction or jurisdiction cannot be determined, the United States refers cases to flag states, in accordance with MARPOL. These procedures require substantial coordination between the Coast Guard, the State Department, and other flag states, and the response rate from flag states has been poor. Different regulations apply to vessels, depending on the individual state.

== Federal laws and regulations ==
In the United States, several federal agencies have some jurisdiction over ships in U.S. waters, but no one agency is responsible for or coordinates all of the relevant government functions. The U.S. Coast Guard and Environmental Protection Agency (EPA) have principal regulatory and standard-setting responsibilities, and the Department of Justice prosecutes violations of federal laws. EPA and the Department of Defense (DOD) began jointly issuing Uniform National Discharge Standards ("UNDS") for armed forces vessels in 2017.

In addition, the Department of State represents the United States at meetings of the IMO and in international treaty negotiations and is responsible for pursuing foreign-flag violations. Other federal agencies have limited roles and responsibilities. For example, the National Oceanic and Atmospheric Administration (NOAA, Department of Commerce) works with the Coast Guard and EPA to report on the effects of marine debris. The Animal and Plant Health Inspection Service (APHIS) is responsible for ensuring quarantine inspection and disposal of food-contaminated garbage. In some cases, states and localities have responsibilities as well.

=== Vessels General Permit ===
EPA issued its most recent Vessels General Permit, under the National Pollutant Discharge Elimination System (NPDES), a Clean Water Act (CWA) program, in 2013. The permit applies to large commercial vessels (79 feet (24 m) in length or greater) (except fishing vessels) and regulates 26 specific types of vessel discharges:

1. Deck Washdown and Runoff and Above Water Line Hull Cleaning
2. Bilge water/Oily Water Separator Effluent
3. Ballast water
4. Anti-fouling Hull Coatings/Hull Coating Leachate
5. Aqueous film forming foam (AFFF)
6. Boiler/Economizer Blowdown
7. Cathodic protection
8. Chain Locker Effluent
9. Controllable Pitch Propeller and Thruster Hydraulic Fluid and other Oil Sea Interfaces including Lubrication Discharges from Paddle Wheel Propulsion, Stern Tubes, Thruster Bearings, Stabilizers, Rudder Bearings, Azimuth Thrusters, and Propulsion Pod Lubrication, and Wire Rope and Mechanica l #Equipment Subject to Immersion]
10. Distillation and Reverse Osmosis Brine
11. Elevator Pit Effluent
12. Firemain Systems
13. Freshwater Layup
14. Gas Turbine Washwater
15. Graywater (except certain commercial vessels operating in the Great Lakes)
16. Motor Gasoline and Compensating Discharge
17. Non-Oily Machinery Wastewater
18. Refrigeration and Air Condensate Discharge
19. Seawater Cooling Overboard Discharge (Including Non-Contact Engine Cooling Water; Hydraulic System Cooling Water, Refrigeration Cooling Water)
20. Seawater Piping Biofouling Prevention
21. Boat Engine Wet Exhaust
22. Sonar Dome Discharge
23. Underwater Ship Husbandry
24. Welldeck Discharges
25. Graywater Mixed with Sewage from Vessels
26. Exhaust Gas Scrubber Washwater Discharge.

In 2016 EPA estimated that approximately 69,000 vessels, both domestic and foreign flagged, were covered by the VGP.

EPA issued its Small Vessels General Permit (sVGP) for smaller commercial vessels in 2014, however this permit only applied to ballast water. In 2018 Congress repealed the sVGP under the Vessel Incidental Discharge Act. As of 2023 small vessels are subject to the ballast water requirements of the VGP, Coast Guard regulations, and applicable state and local government requirements.

=== Vessel Incidental Discharge Act ===
The Vessel Incidental Discharge Act (VIDA), approved in 2018, requires EPA to develop new performance standards for vessel discharges, and generally requires that the new standards be at least as stringent as the 2013 VGP. On October 9, 2024 EPA published final VIDA implementation regulations. VIDA also requires that the Coast Guard issue regulations for compliance and enforcement of the EPA standards. Until these new Coast Guard regulations are promulgated, the existing EPA discharge permits and Coast Guard regulations remain in effect.

=== Sewage ===
Commercial vessels discharging sewage, except fishing vessels, are subject to the VGP or other requirements for small vessels. Recreational vessels are exempt from the permit requirements, but vessel operators must implement Best Management Practices to control their discharges.

==== Marine sanitation devices ====
Section 312 of the CWA prohibits the dumping of untreated or inadequately treated sewage from vessels into the navigable waters of the United States (defined as within 3 miles (4.8 km) of shore). This prohibition is implemented jointly by EPA and the Coast Guard. Commercial and recreational vessels with installed toilets are required to have marine sanitation devices (MSDs), which are designed to prevent the discharge of untreated sewage. EPA is responsible for developing performance standards for MSDs, and the Coast Guard is responsible for MSD design and operation regulations and for certifying MSD compliance with the EPA rules. MSDs are designed either to hold sewage for shore-based disposal or to treat sewage prior to discharge.

The Coast Guard regulations cover three types of MSDs. Large vessels use either Type II or Type III MSDs. In Type II MSDs, the waste is either chemically or biologically treated prior to discharge and must meet limits of no more than 200 fecal coliforms per 100 milliliters and no more than 150 milligrams per liter of suspended solids. Type III MSDs store wastes and do not treat them; the waste is pumped out later and treated in an onshore system or discharged outside U.S. waters. Type I MSDs use chemicals to disinfect the raw sewage prior to discharge and must meet a performance standard for fecal coliform bacteria of not greater than 1,000 per 100 milliliters and no visible floating solids. Type I MSDs are generally only found on recreational vessels or others under 65 feet (20 m) in length. The regulations, which have not been revised since 1976, do not require ship operators to sample, monitor, or report on their effluent discharges.

Critics point out a number of deficiencies with this regulatory structure as it affects large vessels. First, the MSD regulations only cover discharges of bacterial contaminants and suspended solids, while the NPDES permit program for other point sources typically regulates many more pollutants such as chemicals, pesticides, heavy metals, oil, and grease that may be released by large vessels as well as land-based sources. Second, sources subject to NPDES permits must comply with sampling, monitoring, recordkeeping, and reporting requirements, which do not exist in the MSD rules.

In addition, the Coast Guard, responsible for inspecting vessels for compliance with the MSD rules, has been heavily criticized for poor enforcement of Section 312 requirements. In its 2000 report, the Government Accountability Office (GAO) said that Coast Guard inspectors "rarely have time during scheduled ship examinations to inspect sewage treatment equipment or filter systems to see if they are working properly and filtering out potentially harmful contaminants." GAO reported that a number of factors limit the ability of Coast Guard inspectors to detect violations of environmental law and rules, including the inspectors' focus on safety, the large size of some ships, limited time and staff for inspections, and the lack of an element of surprise concerning inspections. The Coast Guard carries out a wide range of responsibilities that encompass both homeland security (ports, waterways, and coastal security, defense readiness, drug and migrant interdiction) and non-homeland security (search and rescue, marine environmental protection, fisheries enforcement, aids to navigation). Since the September 11 terrorist attacks on the United States, the Coast Guard has focused more of its resources on homeland security activities. One likely result is that less of the Coast Guard's time and attention are available for vessel inspections for MSD or other environmental compliance.

Annex IV of MARPOL was drafted to regulate sewage discharges from vessels. It has entered into force internationally and would apply to ships that are flagged in ratifying countries, but because the United States has not ratified Annex IV, it is not mandatory that ships follow it when in U.S. waters. However, its requirements are minimal, even compared with U.S. rules for MSDs. Annex IV requires that vessels be equipped with a certified sewage treatment system or holding tank, but it prescribes no specific performance standards. Within three miles (5 km) of shore, Annex IV requires that sewage discharges be treated by a certified MSD prior to discharge. Between three and 12 miles (19 km) from shore, sewage discharges must be treated by no less than maceration or chlorination; sewage discharges beyond 12 miles (19 km) from shore are unrestricted. Vessels are permitted to meet alternative, less stringent requirements when they are in the jurisdiction of countries where less stringent requirements apply. In U.S. waters, vessels must comply with the regulations implementing Section 312 of the Clean Water Act.

On some ships, especially many of those that travel in Alaskan waters, sewage is treated using Advanced Wastewater Treatment (AWT) systems that generally provide improved screening, treatment, disinfection, and sludge processing as compared with traditional Type II MSDs. AWTs are believed to be very effective in removing pathogens, oxygen demanding substances, suspended solids, oil and grease, and particulate metals from sewage, but only moderately effective in removing dissolved metals and nutrients (ammonia, nitrogen and phosphorus).

==== No-discharge zones ====
Section 312 has another means of addressing sewage discharges, through establishment of no-discharge zones (NDZs) for vessel sewage. A state may completely prohibit the discharge of both treated and untreated sewage from all vessels with installed toilets into some or all waters over which it has jurisdiction (up to 3 miles (4.8 km) from land). To create a no-discharge zone to protect waters from sewage discharges by vessels, the state must apply to EPA under one of three categories.

1. NDZ based on the need for greater environmental protection, and the state demonstrates that adequate pumpout facilities for safe and sanitary removal and treatment of sewage from all vessels are reasonably available. As of 2017, this category of designation has been used for 72 areas representing part or all of the waters of 26 states, including a number of inland states.
2. NDZ for special waters found to have a particular environmental importance (e.g., to protect environmentally sensitive areas such as shellfish beds or coral reefs); it is not necessary for the state to show pumpout availability. This category of designation has been used twice (state waters within the Florida Keys National Marine Sanctuary and the Boundary Waters Canoe area of Minnesota).
3. NDZ to prohibit the discharge of sewage into waters that are drinking water intake zones; it is not necessary for the state to show pumpout availability. This category of designation has been used to protect part of the Hudson River in New York.

=== Solid waste ===
Ship discharges of solid waste are governed by two laws. Title I of the Marine Protection, Research, and Sanctuaries Act (MPRSA) applies to cruise ships and other vessels and makes it illegal to transport garbage from the United States for the purpose of dumping it into ocean waters without a permit or to dump any material transported from a location outside the United States into U.S. territorial seas or the contiguous zone (within 12 nautical miles (22 km) from shore) or ocean waters. EPA is responsible for issuing permits that regulate the disposal of materials at sea (except for dredged material disposal, for which the U.S. Army Corps of Engineers is responsible). Beyond waters that are under U.S. jurisdiction, no MPRSA permit is required for a ship to discharge solid waste. The routine discharge of effluent incidental to the propulsion of vessels is explicitly exempted from the definition of dumping in the MPRSA.

The Act to Prevent Pollution from Ships (APPS) and its regulations, which implement U.S.-ratified provisions of MARPOL, also apply to ships. APPS prohibits the discharge of all garbage within 3 nautical miles (5.6 km) of shore, certain types of garbage within 12 nautical miles (22 km) offshore, and plastic anywhere. It applies to all vessels, whether seagoing or not, regardless of flag, operating in U.S. navigable waters and the Exclusive Economic Zone (EEZ). It is administered by the Coast Guard, which carries out inspection programs to insure the adequacy of port facilities to receive offloaded solid waste.

=== Hazardous waste ===
The Resource Conservation and Recovery Act (RCRA) is the primary federal law that governs hazardous waste management through a "cradle-to-grave" program that controls hazardous waste from the point of generation until ultimate disposal. The act imposes management requirements on generators, transporters, and persons who treat or dispose of hazardous waste. Under this act, a waste is hazardous if it is ignitable, corrosive, reactive, or toxic, or appears on a list of about 100 industrial process waste streams and more than 500 discarded commercial products and chemicals. Treatment, storage, and disposal facilities are required to have permits and comply with operating standards and other EPA regulations.

The owner or operator of a ship may be a generator and/or a transporter of hazardous waste, and thus subject to RCRA rules. Issues that the ship industry may face relating to RCRA include ensuring that hazardous waste is identified at the point at which it is considered generated; ensuring that parties are properly identified as generators, storers, treaters, or disposers; and determining the applicability of RCRA requirements to each. Hazardous waste generated on board ships is stored onboard until the wastes can be offloaded for recycling or disposal in accordance with RCRA.

A range of activities on board cruise generate hazardous wastes and toxic substances that would ordinarily be presumed to be subject to RCRA. Ships are potentially subject to RCRA requirements to the extent that chemicals used for operations such as ship maintenance and passenger services result in the generation of hazardous wastes. However, it is not entirely clear what regulations apply to the management and disposal of these wastes.30 RCRA rules that cover small-quantity generators (those that generate more than 100 kilograms but less than 1,000 kilograms of hazardous waste per month) are less stringent than those for large-quantity generators (generating more than 1,000 kilograms per month), and it is unclear whether ships are classified as large or small generators of hazardous waste. Moreover, some ship companies argue that they generate less than 100 kilograms per month and therefore should be classified in a third category, as "conditionally exempt small-quantity generators," a categorization that allows for less rigorous requirements for notification, recordkeeping, and the like.

A release of hazardous substances by a vessel could also theoretically trigger coverage under the Comprehensive Environmental Response, Compensation, and Liability Act (CERCLA; also known as "Superfund.").

In addition to RCRA, hazardous waste discharges from ships are subject to Section 311 of the Clean Water Act, which prohibits the discharge of hazardous substances in harmful quantities into or upon the navigable waters of the United States, adjoining shorelines, or into or upon the waters of the contiguous zone.

=== Bilge water ===
Section 311 of the Clean Water Act, as amended by the Oil Pollution Act of 1990, applies to ships and prohibits discharge of oil or hazardous substances in harmful quantities into or upon U.S. navigable waters, or into or upon the waters of the contiguous zone, or which may affect natural resources in the U.S. EEZ (extending 200 miles (320 km) offshore). Coast Guard regulations prohibit discharge of oil within 12 miles (19 km) from shore, unless passed through a 15-ppm oil water separator, and unless the discharge does not cause a visible sheen. Beyond 12 miles (19 km), oil or oily mixtures can be discharged while a vessel is proceeding en route and if the oil content without dilution is less than 100 ppm. Vessels are required to maintain an Oil Record Book to record disposal of oily residues and discharges overboard or disposal of bilge water.

In addition to Section 311 requirements, APPS implements MARPOL Annex I concerning oil pollution. APPS applies to all U.S. flagged ships anywhere in the world and to all foreign flagged vessels operating in the navigable waters of the United States, or while at a port under U.S. jurisdiction. To implement APPS, the Coast Guard has promulgated regulations prohibiting the discharge of oil or oily mixtures into the sea within 12 nautical miles (22 km) of the nearest land, except under limited conditions. However, because many ships are foreign registered and because APPS only applies to foreign ships within U.S. navigable waters, the APPS regulations have limited applicability to ship operations.

=== Ballast water discharge limitations ===
The VGP sets numeric ballast water discharge limits for large commercial vessels. The limits are expressed as the maximum acceptable concentration of living organisms per cubic meter of ballast water. The Coast Guard worked with EPA in developing the scientific basis and the regulatory requirements in the VGP.

=== Uniform National Discharge Standards for armed forces vessels ===
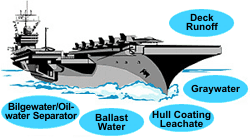
Illustration of some of the discharge types subject to UNDS regulations.

Congress amended the CWA in 1996 to require development of uniform national discharge standards ("UNDS") for military vessels. The standards are being developed jointly by EPA and DOD. Initial regulations were published in 1999, to identify and characterize a wide variety of discharge types from ships and boats. A final rule setting specific standards for 11 discharge types was published in 2017. A final rule covering 11 additional discharge categories was published in 2020. The majority of vessels covered belong to the U.S. Navy, but the regulations also cover vessels of the Coast Guard, Marine Corps, Army, Military Sealift Command, and Air Force, totalling over 7,000 vessels.

=== Enforcement ===
In April 2021 a ship engineer on the Zao Galaxy, an oil tanker, was convicted in the United States District Court for the Northern District of California for intentionally dumping oily bilge water in February 2019 and submitting false paperwork in an attempt to conceal the crime. The ship operator pleaded guilty to violating APPS and was fined $1.65 million US and ordered to "implement a comprehensive Environmental Compliance Plan." The first assistant engineer was convicted of violating APPS, obstruction and witness tampering; and sentenced to a $2,500 fine, along with three years of probation and 200 hours of community service.

== See also ==
- Cruise ship pollution in the United States
- Merchant Shipping (Pollution) Act 2006
- Merchant Marine Act of 1920
