= Cruise ship pollution in the United States =

Pollution of cruise ships in the United States

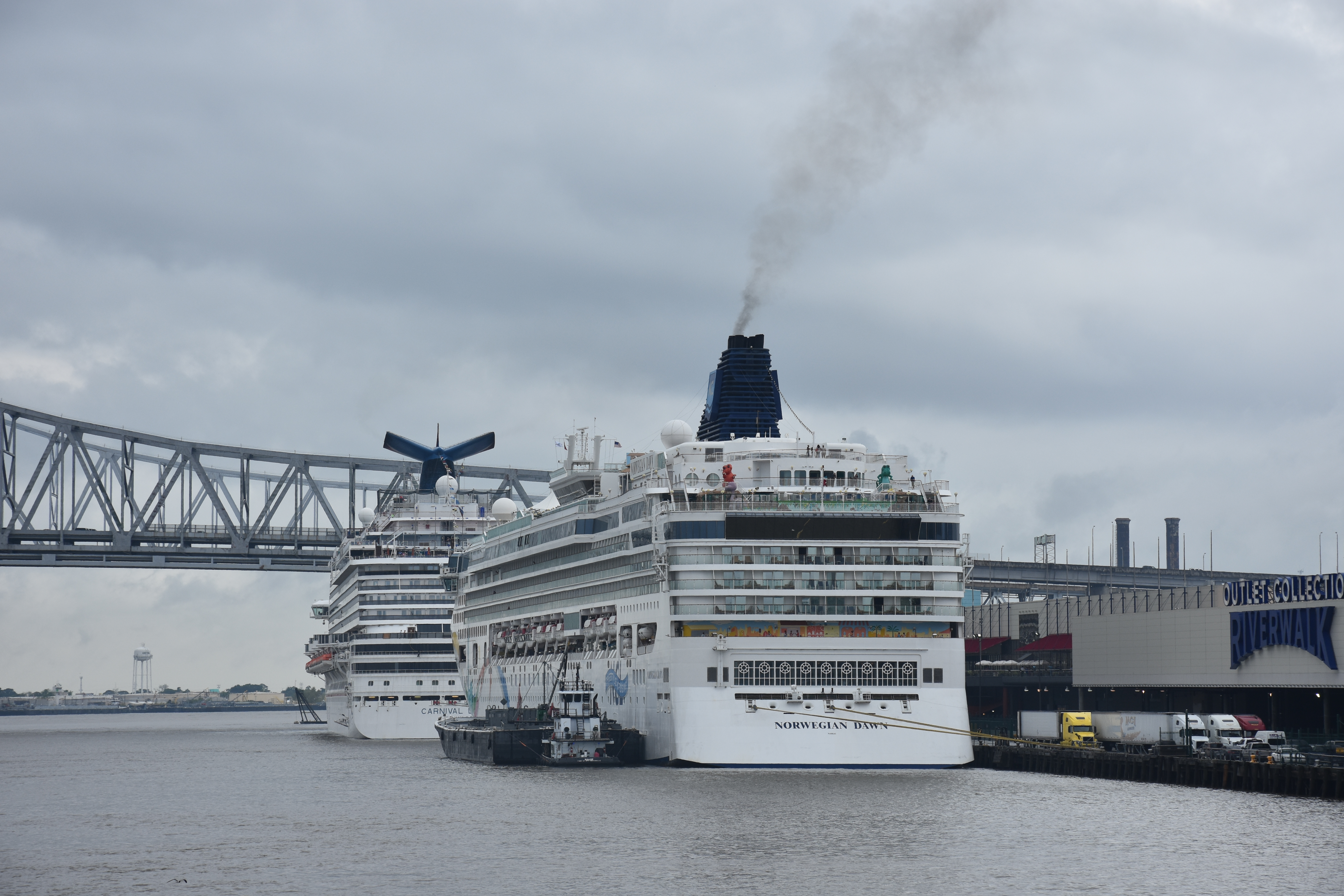
Norwegian Dawn and Carnival Dream moored alongside in New Orleans (2015)

Cruise ships carrying several thousand passengers and crew have been compared to “floating cities,” and the volume of wastes that they produce is comparably large, consisting of sewage; wastewater from sinks, showers, and galleys (graywater); hazardous wastes; solid waste; oily bilge water; ballast water; and air pollution. The waste streams generated by cruise ships are governed by a number of international protocols (especially MARPOL) and U.S. domestic laws (including the Clean Water Act and the Act to Prevent Pollution from Ships), regulations, and standards, but there is no single law or rule. Some cruise ship waste streams appear to be well regulated, such as solid wastes (garbage and plastics) and bilge water. But there is overlap of some areas, and there are gaps in others.

In 2000, the U.S. Congress enacted legislation restricting cruise ship discharges in U.S. navigable waters within the state of Alaska. California, and Maine have enacted state-specific laws concerning cruise ship pollution, and a few other states have entered into voluntary agreements with industry to address management of cruise ship discharges. Meanwhile, the cruise industry has voluntarily undertaken initiatives to improve pollution prevention, by adopting waste management guidelines and procedures and researching new technologies. Concerns about cruise ship pollution raise issues for Congress in three broad areas: adequacy of laws and regulations, research needs, and oversight and enforcement of existing requirements. Legislation to regulate cruise ship discharges of sewage, graywater, and bilge water nationally was introduced in the 109th Congress, but there was no further congressional action.

This article describes the several types of waste streams that cruise ships may discharge and emit. It identifies the complex body of international and domestic laws that address pollution from cruise ships. It then describes federal and state legislative activity concerning cruise ships in Alaskan waters and activities in a few other states, as well as current industry initiatives to manage cruise ship pollution.

== Background ==
More than 46,000 commercial vessels – tankers, bulk carriers, container ships, barges, and passenger ships – travel the oceans and other waters of the world, carrying cargo and passengers for commerce, transport, and recreation. Their activities are regulated and scrutinized in a number of respects by international protocols and U.S. domestic laws, including those designed to protect against discharges of pollutants that could harm marine resources, other parts of the ambient environment, and human health. However, there are overlaps of some requirements, gaps in other areas, geographic differences in jurisdiction based on differing definitions, and questions about the adequacy of enforcement.

Public attention to the environmental impacts of the maritime industry has been especially focused on the cruise industry, in part because its ships are highly visible and in part because of the industry's desire to promote a positive image. It represents a relatively small fraction of the entire shipping industry worldwide. As of January 2008, passenger ships (which include cruise ships and ferries) composed about 12% of the world shipping fleet. The cruise industry is a significant and growing contributor to the U.S. economy, providing more than $32 billion in total benefits annually and generating more than 330,000 U.S. jobs, but also making the environmental impacts of its activities an issue to many. Since 1980, the average annual growth rate in the number of cruise passengers worldwide has been 8.4%, and in 2005, cruises hosted an estimated 11.5 million passengers. Cruises are especially popular in the United States. In 2005, U.S. ports handled 8.6 million cruise embarcations (75% of global passengers), 6.3% more than in 2004. The worldwide cruise ship fleet consists of more than 230 ships, and the majority are foreign-flagged, with Liberia and Panama being the most popular flag countries. Foreign-flag cruise vessels owned by six companies account for nearly 95% of passenger ships operating in U.S. waters. Each year, the industry adds new ships to the total fleet, vessels that are bigger, more elaborate and luxurious, and that carry larger numbers of passengers and crew. Over the past two decades, the average ship size has been increasing at the rate of roughly 90 feet (27 m) every five years. The average ship entering the market from 2008 to 2011 will be more than 1,050 feet (320 m) long and will weigh more than 130,000 tons.

To the cruise ship industry, a key issue is demonstrating to the public that cruising is safe and healthy for passengers and the tourist communities that are visited by their ships. Cruise ships carrying several thousand passengers and crew have been compared to “floating cities,” in part because the volume of wastes produced and requiring disposal is greater than that of many small cities on land. During a typical one-week voyage, a large cruise ship (with 3,000 passengers and crew) is estimated to generate 210,000 US gallons (790,000 L) of sewage; 1 million US gallons (3,800 m^{3}) of graywater (wastewater from sinks, showers, and laundries); more than 130 US gallons (490 L) of hazardous wastes; 8 tons of solid waste; and 25,000 US gallons (95 m^{3}) of oily bilge water. Passengers can singlehandedly produce up to 7.7 pounds of waste in a single day aboard a cruise ship. Those wastes, if not properly treated and disposed of, can pose risks to human health, welfare, and the environment. Environmental advocates have raised concerns about the adequacy of existing laws for managing these wastes, and suggest that enforcement of existing laws is weak.

A 2000 Government Accountability Office (GAO) report focused attention on problems of cruise vessel compliance with environmental requirements. GAO found that between 1993 and 1998, foreign-flag cruise ships were involved in 87 confirmed illegal discharge cases in U.S. waters. A few of the cases included multiple illegal discharge incidents occurring over the six-year period. GAO reviewed three major waste streams (solids, hazardous chemicals, and oily bilge water) and concluded that 83% of the cases involved discharges of oil or oil-based products, the volumes of which ranged from a few drops to hundreds of gallons. The balance of the cases involved discharges of plastic or garbage. GAO judged that 72% of the illegal discharges were accidental, 15% were intentional, and 13% could not be determined. The 87 cruise ship cases represented 4% of the 2,400 illegal discharge cases by foreign-flag ships (including tankers, cargo ships and other commercial vessels, as well as cruise ships) confirmed during the six years studied by GAO. Although cruise ships operating in U.S. waters have been involved in a relatively small number of pollution cases, GAO said, several have been widely publicized and have led to criminal prosecutions and multimillion-dollar fines.

In 2000, a coalition of 53 environmental advocacy groups petitioned the Environmental Protection Agency (EPA) to take regulatory action to address pollution by cruise ships. The petition was amended in 2000 to request that EPA also examine air pollution from cruise ships. The petition called for an investigation of wastewater, oil, and solid waste discharges from cruise ships. In response, EPA agreed to study cruise ship discharges and waste management approaches. As part of that effort, EPA issued a background document in 2000 with preliminary information and recommendations for further assessment through data collection and public information hearings. The agency released its final Cruise Ship Discharge Assessment Report in 2009. The report summarized findings of recent data collection activities, especially from cruise ships operating in Alaskan waters.

Concurrently, litigation regarding the National Pollutant Discharge Elimination System (NPDES) permit program led to a 2008 decision by the Ninth Circuit Court, ruling that EPA could not exclude vessel discharges from NPDES requirements. Subsequently, EPA issued an initial Vessel General Permit (VGP) with an effective date of February 6, 2009.

== Cruise ship waste streams ==
Cruise ships generate a number of waste streams that can result in discharges to the marine environment, including sewage, graywater, hazardous wastes, oily bilge water, ballast water, and solid waste. They also emit air pollutants to the air and water. These wastes, if not properly treated and disposed of, can be a significant source of pathogens, nutrients, and toxic substances with the potential to threaten human health and damage aquatic life. Cruise ships represent a small – although highly visible – portion of the entire international shipping industry, and the waste streams described here are not unique to cruise ships. However, particular types of wastes, such as sewage, graywater, and solid waste, may be of greater concern for cruise ships relative to other seagoing vessels, because of the large numbers of passengers and crew that cruise ships carry and the large volumes of wastes that they produce. Further, because cruise ships tend to concentrate their activities in specific coastal areas and visit the same ports repeatedly (especially Florida, California, New York City, Galveston, Seattle, and the waters of Alaska), their cumulative impact on a local scale could be significant, as can impacts of individual large-volume releases (either accidental or intentional).

== International laws and regulations ==
MARPOL 73/78 is one of the most important treaties regulating pollution from ships. Six Annexes of the Convention cover the various sources of pollution from ships and provide an overarching framework for international objectives. In the U.S., the convention is implemented through the Act to Prevent Pollution from Ships. Under the provisions of the convention, the United States can take direct enforcement action under U.S. laws against foreign-flagged ships when pollution discharge incidents occur within U.S. jurisdiction. When incidents occur outside U.S. jurisdiction or jurisdiction cannot be determined, the United States refers cases to flag states, in accordance with MARPOL. These procedures require substantial coordination between the Coast Guard, the State Department, and other flag states, and the response rate from flag states has been poor.

== Federal laws and regulations ==
In the United States, several federal agencies have some jurisdiction over cruise ships in U.S. waters, but no one agency is responsible for or coordinates all of the relevant government functions. The U.S. Coast Guard and EPA have principal regulatory and standard-setting responsibilities.

Cruise ships that are 79 feet (24 m) in length or greater, are subject to the requirements of the EPA Vessel General Permit (VGP). The most recent VGP was published in 2013. EPA issued its Small Vessel General Permit (sVGP) for smaller cruise ships in 2014, however this permit only applied to ballast water. In 2018 Congress repealed the sVGP under the Vessel Incidental Discharge Act (VIDA). As of 2026 small vessels are subject to the ballast water requirements of the VGP, Coast Guard regulations, and applicable state and local government requirements. EPA published final VIDA implementation regulations on October 9, 2024. The Coast Guard is also required to issue regulations for compliance and enforcement of the EPA standards. Until the Coast Guard publishes updated regulations, the existing EPA discharge permits and Coast Guard regulations remain in effect.

The Department of Justice prosecutes violations of federal laws. In addition, the Department of State represents the United States at meetings of the IMO and in international treaty negotiations and is responsible for pursuing foreign-flag violations. Other federal agencies have limited roles and responsibilities. For example, the National Oceanic and Atmospheric Administration (NOAA, Department of Commerce) works with the Coast Guard and EPA to report on the effects of marine debris. The Animal and Plant Health Inspection Service (APHIS) is responsible for ensuring quarantine inspection and disposal of food-contaminated garbage (these APHIS responsibilities are part of the Department of Homeland Security). In some cases, states and localities have responsibilities as well.

=== Sewage ===
Commercial vessels are required to obtain NPDES permits pursuant to Section 402 of the Clean Water Act. Section 312 of the Act prohibits the dumping of untreated or inadequately treated sewage from vessels into the navigable waters of the United States (defined in the act as within 3 miles (4.8 km) of shore). Cruise ships are subject to this prohibition. Commercial and recreational vessels with installed toilets are required to have marine sanitation devices, which are designed to prevent the discharge of untreated sewage. Beyond 3 miles (4.8 km), raw sewage can be discharged. On some cruise ships, especially many of those that travel in Alaskan waters, sewage is treated using Advanced Wastewater Treatment (AWT) systems that generally provide improved screening, treatment, disinfection, and sludge processing as compared with traditional MSDs (marine sanitation devices). AWTs are believed to be very effective in removing pathogens, oxygen-demanding substances, suspended solids, oil and grease, and particulate metals from sewage, but only moderately effective in removing dissolved metals and nutrients (ammonia, nitrogen and phosphorus).

States may also establish no-discharge zones (NDZs) for vessel sewage, under section 312. A state may completely prohibit the discharge of both treated and untreated sewage from all vessels with installed toilets into some or all waters over which it has jurisdiction (up to 3 miles (4.8 km) from land). As of 2017, this designation has been used for 72 areas representing part or all of the waters of 26 states, including a number of inland states.

=== Greywater ===
Graywater discharges from large cruise ships are regulated by the 2013 VGP.

Pursuant to a state law in Alaska, greywater must be treated prior to discharge into that state's waters.

=== Solid waste ===
Cruise ship discharges of solid waste are governed by two federal laws. Title I of the Marine Protection, Research and Sanctuaries Act makes it illegal to transport garbage from the United States for the purpose of dumping it into ocean waters without a permit or to dump material from outside the U.S. into U.S. waters. Beyond U.S. waters, no MPRSA permit is required for a cruise ship to discharge solid waste. The routine discharge of effluent incidental to the propulsion of vessels is explicitly exempted from the definition of dumping in the MPRSA.28

The Act to Prevent Pollution from Ships prohibits the discharge of all garbage within 3 nautical miles (5.6 km) of shore, certain types of garbage within 12 nautical miles (22 km) offshore, and plastic anywhere. It applies to all vessels operating in U.S. navigable waters and the Exclusive Economic Zone (EEZ).

=== Hazardous waste ===
The Resource Conservation and Recovery Act (RCRA) is the primary federal law that governs hazardous waste management. The owner or operator of a cruise ship may be a generator and/or a transporter of hazardous waste, and thus subject to RCRA rules. Issues that the cruise ship industry may face relating to RCRA include ensuring that hazardous waste is identified at the point at which it is considered generated; ensuring that parties are properly identified as generators, storers, treaters, or disposers; and determining the applicability of RCRA requirements to each. Hazardous waste generated onboard cruise ships are stored onboard until the wastes can be offloaded for recycling or disposal in accordance with RCRA.

A range of activities on board cruise ships generate hazardous wastes and toxic substances that would ordinarily be presumed to be subject to RCRA. Cruise ships are potentially subject to RCRA requirements to the extent that chemicals used for operations such as ship maintenance and passenger services result in the generation of hazardous wastes. However, it is not entirely clear what regulations apply to the management and disposal of these wastes. RCRA rules that cover small-quantity generators (those that generate more than 100 kilograms but less than 1,000 kilograms of hazardous waste per month) are less stringent than those for large-quantity generators (generating more than 1,000 kilograms per month), and it is unclear whether cruise ships are classified as large or small generators of hazardous waste. Moreover, some cruise companies argue that they generate less than 100 kilograms per month and therefore should be classified in a third category, as “conditionally exempt small-quantity generators,” a categorization that allows for less rigorous requirements for notification, recordkeeping, and the like.

In addition to RCRA, hazardous waste discharges from cruise ships are subject to Section 311 of the Clean Water Act, which prohibits the discharge of hazardous substances in harmful quantities into or upon the navigable waters of the United States, adjoining shorelines, or into or upon the waters of the contiguous zone.

=== Bilge water ===
Section 311 of the Clean Water Act, as amended by the Oil Pollution Act of 1990, applies to cruise ships and prohibits discharge of oil or hazardous substances in harmful quantities into or upon U.S. navigable waters, or into or upon the waters of the contiguous zone, or which may affect natural resources in the U.S. EEZ (extending 200 miles (320 km) offshore). Coast Guard regulations prohibit discharge of oil within 12 miles (19 km) from shore, unless passed through a 15-ppm oil water separator, and unless the discharge does not cause a visible sheen. Beyond 12 miles (19 km), oil or oily mixtures can be discharged while a vessel is proceeding en route and if the oil content without dilution is less than 100 ppm. Vessels are required to maintain an Oil Record Book to record disposal of oily residues and discharges overboard or disposal of bilge water.

In addition to Section 311 requirements, the Act to Prevent Pollution from Ships (APPS) implements MARPOL Annex I concerning oil pollution. APPS applies to all U.S. flagged ships anywhere in the world and to all foreign flagged vessels operating in the navigable waters of the United States, or while at a port under U.S. jurisdiction. To implement APPS, the Coast Guard has promulgated regulations prohibiting the discharge of oil or oily mixtures into the sea within 12 nautical miles (22 km) of the nearest land, except under limited conditions. However, because most cruise lines are foreign registered and because APPS only applies to foreign ships within U.S. navigable waters, the APPS regulations have limited applicability to cruise ship operations. In addition, most cruise lines have adopted policies that restrict discharges of machinery space waste within three miles (5 km) from shore.

=== Cruise ship efforts to reduce pollution ===
Following the 2000 GAO report, twelve cruise ship companies that had violated pollution regulations implemented new environmental strategies during 2003 to 2008. Several cruise lines within this group and others who had not been cited for violations sought to ameliorate their pollution of marine waters. Some of these companies reduced their waste production by transferring over from single use plastic packaging to reusable plastic containers for food being prepared on board and cutlery being used on the pool decks. Princess Cruises and Royal Caribbean Cruise Line acknowledged the waste problem, and adopted reusable items to work towards a resolution. Recycling programs have also been implemented, and, because of the use of compactors on ships, plastics and aluminum are condensed and made easily recyclable upon ships return to port. The United States alone gains upward of 18,000 pounds of recycled goods from these practices.

Some cruise lines have also taken it upon themselves to reduce air pollution, by using alternative, cleaner energy sources which has positive implications for marine waters as well. Shorepower (cold ironing), battery power, fuel cells, and liquefied natural gas (LNG) are among sources that are being explored. Carnival Corporation is one example of a cruise liner that is currently pursuing cleaner energies. In 2016 Carnival announced that it had agreed to partner with Shell and utilize LNG to power its next two new ships. Liquefied natural gas, a fossil fuel, is a much cleaner source of energy than oil and also much less expensive, to the benefit of cruise companies. Transitioning away from oil will help cruise liners combat their problems with bilge pollution. Cruise ships efforts to reduce their waste, recycle, and find more renewable energies will help alleviate their current rate of pollution of marine waters.

== Repeat offenders and imposed sanctions ==
Some large cruise shipping lines have violated regulations by illegally bypassing the onboard oily water separator and discharging untreated oily wastewater. These violations by means of a so-called "magic pipe" have been prosecuted and resulted in large fines. Ship employees may be prosecuted and subject to imprisonment and fines.

In 2002 the Carnival Corporation pleaded guilty in United States District Court in Miami to criminal charges related to falsifying records of the oil-contaminated bilge water that six of its ships dumped into the sea from 1996 through 2001. The Carnival Corporation was ordered to pay $18 million in fines and perform community service, received five years' probation and must submit to a court-supervised worldwide environmental-compliance program for each of its cruise ships.

For dumping oily waste into the seas and attempted cover-up Princess Cruise Lines was fined $40 million in 2016. According to federal authorities, it was the "largest-ever criminal penalty" for intentional vessel pollution. Officials said that these practices began in 2005 and persisted until August 2013, when a newly hired engineer blew the whistle. As part of its plea agreement, ships of the parent company Carnival Cruise lines were subjected to a court supervised environmental compliance plan for five years.

For violation of the probation terms of 2016 Carnival and its Princess line were ordered to pay an additional $20 million penalty in 2019. The new violations included discharging plastic into waters in the Bahamas, falsifying records and interfering with court supervision.

== See also ==
- Cruise ship pollution in Europe
- Environmental issues in the United States
- Marine Environmental Protection (U.S. Coast Guard)
