= Fundo River =

There are several rivers named Fundo River in Brazil:

- Fundo River (Espírito Santo)
- Fundo River (Sergipe)

== See also ==
- Passo Fundo River, Rio Grande do Sul, Brazil
