= European Sea Ports Organisation =

Organisation of the European Union

The European Sea Ports Organisation or ESPO, founded in 1993, is the representative body of the port authorities, port associations and port administrations of the seaports of the member states of the European Union and of Norway. Its membership includes ports from non-member states of the European Union which are admitted under observer status.

The headquarters of ESPO are in Brussels and include a General Assembly, an Executive Committee and 8 special committees. The ESPO represents the interests of the seaports of the European Union. ESPO represents over 98 per cent of the seaports of the European Union, and has direct communication with 500 European ports.

== Origins ==
The European Commission created the Port Working Group in 1974 with membership consisting of delegates from the port authorities of the major ports of Europe. The PWG process culminated in 1993 with the founding of the ESPO. ESPO functions as an independent organisation which lobbies for the interests of its member port authorities. Ferdinand Suykens, former director-general of the port of Antwerp, became the first chairman of ESPO.

== Governance ==
The highest body in the organisation is the General Assembly which consists of three members from each member state. It is responsible for creating policy based on the recommendations of the technical committees and convenes twice a year at a minimum. The Executive committee consists of a chairperson, two vice chairmen and two members of the General Assembly which are chosen to serve on the committee. The Executive committee is responsible for liaising with the European Commission and the other European institutions. The technical committees include the transport committee, the marine committee and the environment committee.

== Environment ==
In 2003 the ESPO published an environmental code of practice regulating environmental practices amongst its member port authorities. The ESPO-developed Environmental Code of Practice is used in conjunction with the Ports Environmental Review System (PERS) to develop policy, management and performance standards compliant with the environmental code. PERS was developed as part of the mandate of the ESPO-created ECOPORTS project.

== Conferences ==
ESPO organises annual Port conferences. The 12th annual ESPO conference was on 30 April 2015 and was held in Athens, Greece.
