= Meir Fund =

American Orthodox Jewish rabbi

Meir Fund is an American Orthodox rabbi, Kabbalist, and spiritual leader of Congregation Sheves Achim, 1517 Avenue H, in Brooklyn, New York. He comes from a long line of rabbis in Europe and was close with both Rabbi Joseph Soloveitchik during his student days and with Rabbi Shlomo Carlebach.

In October 1977, on Succos, Rabbi Fund performed at a concert in the Gramercy Park Brotherhood Synagogue's succah that jointly benefited the Hopi Legal Fund, which defended Hopi lands in the West from being strip mined, and Moshav Me'or Modin, a communal settlement in Israel led by Rabbi Shlomo Carlbach.

"We felt the pain of the Indian plight. We wanted to build bridges and we felt that Succoth would be an appropriate time since it is a harvest festival." Fund also stated, "We felt a common spiritual, archetypal, almost primordial bond and a communal experience of suffering, of being the eternal minority."

Since 1992, he has led Kabbalah classes in the Greenwich Village Synagogue. He also led Kabbalah classes at the 92nd Street Y. According to Fund, Kabbalah is analogous to an ocean.

"If I say I'm swimming in the Pacific, it doesn't mean that I'm swimming in water that's 10,000 feet deep, he said. I could be walking in a puddle at the end of the ocean. And that's what is sometimes misleading. But the Kabbalah is an ocean, and there are parts where anybody can swim, and parts where you have to be a very good swimmer."
