= International Convention on the Establishment of an International Fund for Compensation for Oil Pollution Damage =

1992 international maritime treaty

FUND92
International Convention on the Establishment of an International Fund for Compensation for Oil Pollution Damage, 1992
- Effective: 30 May 2006 (1992 version)
- Parties: 115

The International Convention on the Establishment of an International Fund for Compensation for Oil Pollution Damage, 1992, often referred to as FUND92 or FUND, is an international maritime treaty, administered by the International Maritime Organization. The original FUND convention in 1969 was drawn up as an enhancement to CLC meant on one hand to relieve shipowners from unfair liabilities due to unforeseeable circumstances and on the other hand remove liability caps that some member states thought were too low. The fund is obliged to pay victims of pollution when damages exceed the shipowner's liability, when there is no liable shipowner, or when the shipowner is unable to pay its liability. The fund is also required to "indemnify the shipowner or his insurer" in spills where a ship is in full compliance with international conventions, and no wilful misconduct caused the spill.

The 1992 convention came into force on 30 May 2006. As of November 2018, the convention had been ratified by 115 states representing 95 per cent of the gross tonnage of the world's merchant fleet. The Bolivian, North Korean, Honduran, Lebanese, and, Mongolian flags of convenience have not ratified the treaty.
