= Act to Prevent Pollution from Ships =

United States law

- Long title: An Act to implement the Protocol of 1978 Relating to the International Convention for the Prevention of Pollution from Ships, 1973, and for other purposes.
- Acronyms (colloquial): APPS
- Nicknames: Act to Prevent Pollution from Ships of 1980
- Enacted by: the 96th United States Congress
- Effective: October 21, 1980

Citations
- Public law: 96-478
- Statutes at Large: 94 Stat. 2297

Codification
- Acts repealed: Oil Pollution Act of 1961; Oil Pollution Act of 1973
- Titles amended: 33 U.S.C.: Navigable Waters
- U.S.C. sections created: 33 U.S.C. ch. 33 § 1901 et seq.

Legislative history
- Introduced in the House as H.R. 6665 by John M. Murphy (D-NY) on February 28, 1980; Committee consideration by House Merchant Marine and Fisheries, Senate Commerce, Science, and Transportation; Passed the House on August 18, 1980 (Passed); Passed the Senate on September 23, 1980 (Passed) with amendment; House agreed to Senate amendment on September 30, 1980 (Agreed) with further amendment; Senate agreed to House amendment on October 1, 1980 (Agreed); Signed into law by President Jimmy E. Carter on October 21, 1980

The Act to Prevent Pollution from Ships (APPS, 33 U.S.C. §§1905-1915) is a United States law that implements the provisions of MARPOL 73/78 and the annexes of MARPOL to which the United States is a party. The most recent U.S. action concerning MARPOL occurred in April 2006, when the U.S. Senate approved Annex VI, which regulates air pollution (Treaty Doc. 108–7, Exec. Rept. 109–13). Following that approval, in March 2007, the House of Representatives approved legislation to implement the standards in Annex VI (H.R. 802), through regulations to be promulgated by Environmental Protection Agency in consultation with the U.S. Coast Guard.

APPS applies to all U.S.-flagged ships anywhere in the world, and to all foreign-flagged vessels operating in navigable waters of the United States, or while at port under U.S. jurisdiction. The Coast Guard has primary responsibility to prescribe and enforce regulations necessary to implement APPS in these waters. The regulatory mechanism established in APPS to implement MARPOL is separate and distinct from the Clean Water Act and other federal environmental laws.

The H.R. 6665 legislation was passed by the 96th U.S. Congressional session and signed by U.S. President Jimmy Carter on October 21, 1980.

== See also ==
- Clean Water Act
- Merchant Marine Act of 1920
- Merchant Shipping (Pollution) Act 2006
- Regulation of ship pollution in the United States
