= Merchant Shipping (Pollution) Act 2006 =

Act of the Parliament of the United Kingdom

Merchant Shipping (Pollution) Act 2006 (Note: Section 4(1).)
- Act of Parliament
- Parliament of the United Kingdom
- Long title: An Act to enable effect to be given to the Supplementary Fund Protocol 2003 and to future revisions of the international arrangements relating to compensation for oil pollution from ships; to enable effect to be given to Annex VI of the MARPOL Convention; and to amend section 178(1) of the Merchant Shipping Act 1995.
- Citation: 2006 c. 8
- Territorial extent: United Kingdom

Dates
- Royal assent: 30 March 2006
- Commencement: 30 March 2006 (sections 1 (except 1(2)(b)), 2 and 4); 30 May 2006 (rest of act); (Note: Section 4(2).)
Other legislation
| Amends | Merchant Shipping Act 1995 |

Status: Current legislation

History of passage through Parliament

Text of statute as originally enacted

Text of the Merchant Shipping (Pollution) Act 2006 as in force today (including any amendments) within the United Kingdom, from legislation.gov.uk.

The Merchant Shipping (Pollution) Act 2006 (c. 8) is an act of the Parliament of the United Kingdom. It has three main purposes: to give effect to the Supplementary Fund Protocol 2003, to give effect to Annex VI of the MARPOL Convention, and to amend section 178(1) of the Merchant Shipping Act 1995.

== Supplementary Fund Protocol ==
Section 1 of the act allows the government to enact provisions giving effect to the 2003 protocol by affirmative Order in Council. The protocol, drawn up under the auspices of the International Maritime Organization establishes an international fund which will pay out up to $1 billion in International Monetary Fund special drawing rights in cases of oil slicks and other environmental pollution.

== MARPOL Convention ==
Section 2 of the act amends section 128(1) of the Merchant Shipping Act 1995 by inserting an extra paragraph extending the government's power to make provisions by Order in Council to include giving effect to the convention.

The MARPOL Convention contains a 4.5% by worldwide mass limit on the sulphur content of fuel oil.

== Merchant Shipping Act 1995 ==
Section 3 of the act amends section 178(1) of the Merchant Shipping Act 1995 to restrict claims to being enforced within three years of the damage occurring, whereas previously it had been restricted to within three years after "the claim against the Fund arose", and within six years of the damage occurring.

== See also ==
- Merchant Shipping Act
- Environmental issues with shipping

== Bibliography ==
- Halsbury's Statutes
