= Coast =

Area where land meets the sea or ocean

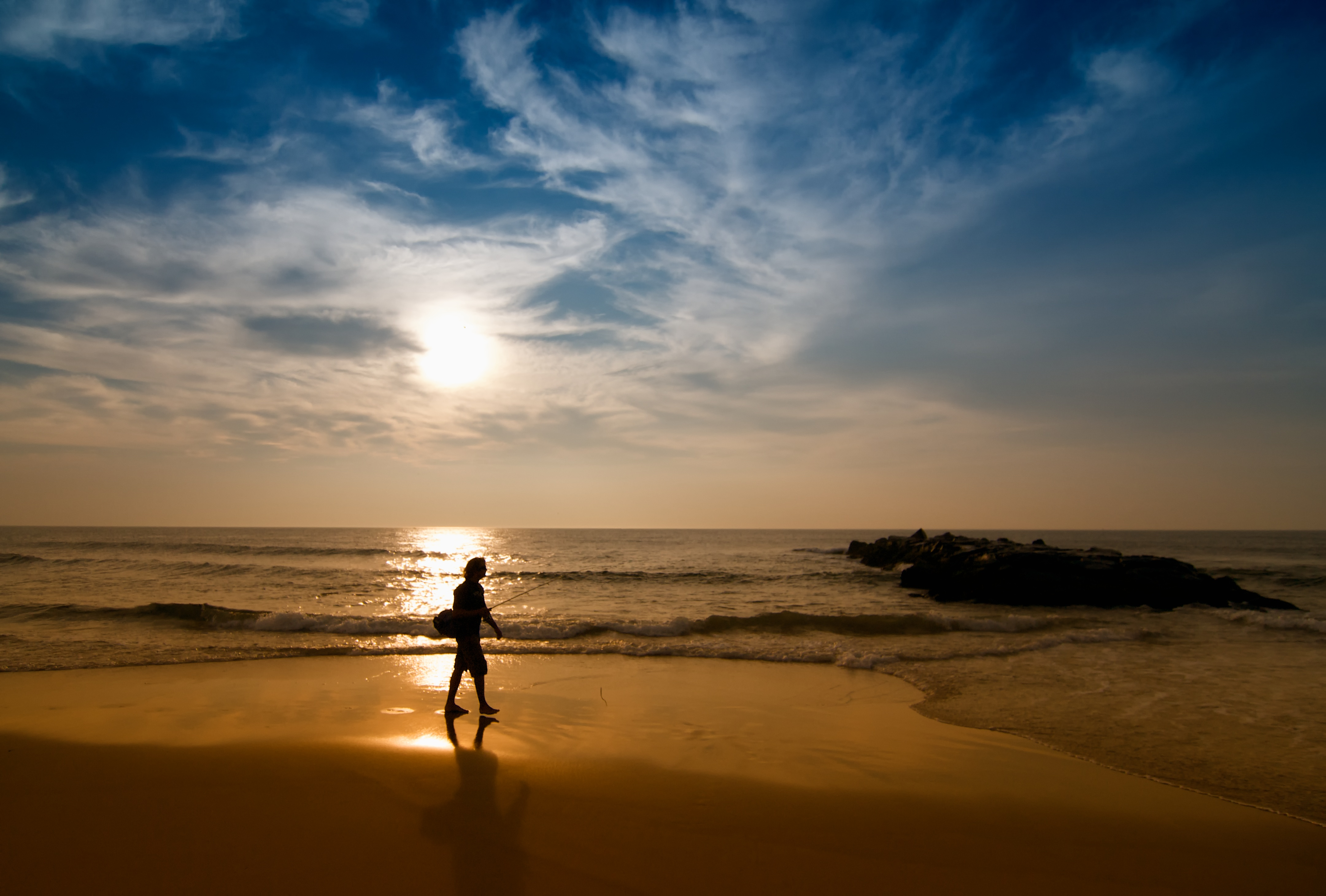
Sunrise on the Jersey Shore coastline at Spring Lake, New Jersey, U.S. The coastal waters of the Northeast megalopolis constitute one of the fastest-warming urban ocean shorelines in the world.

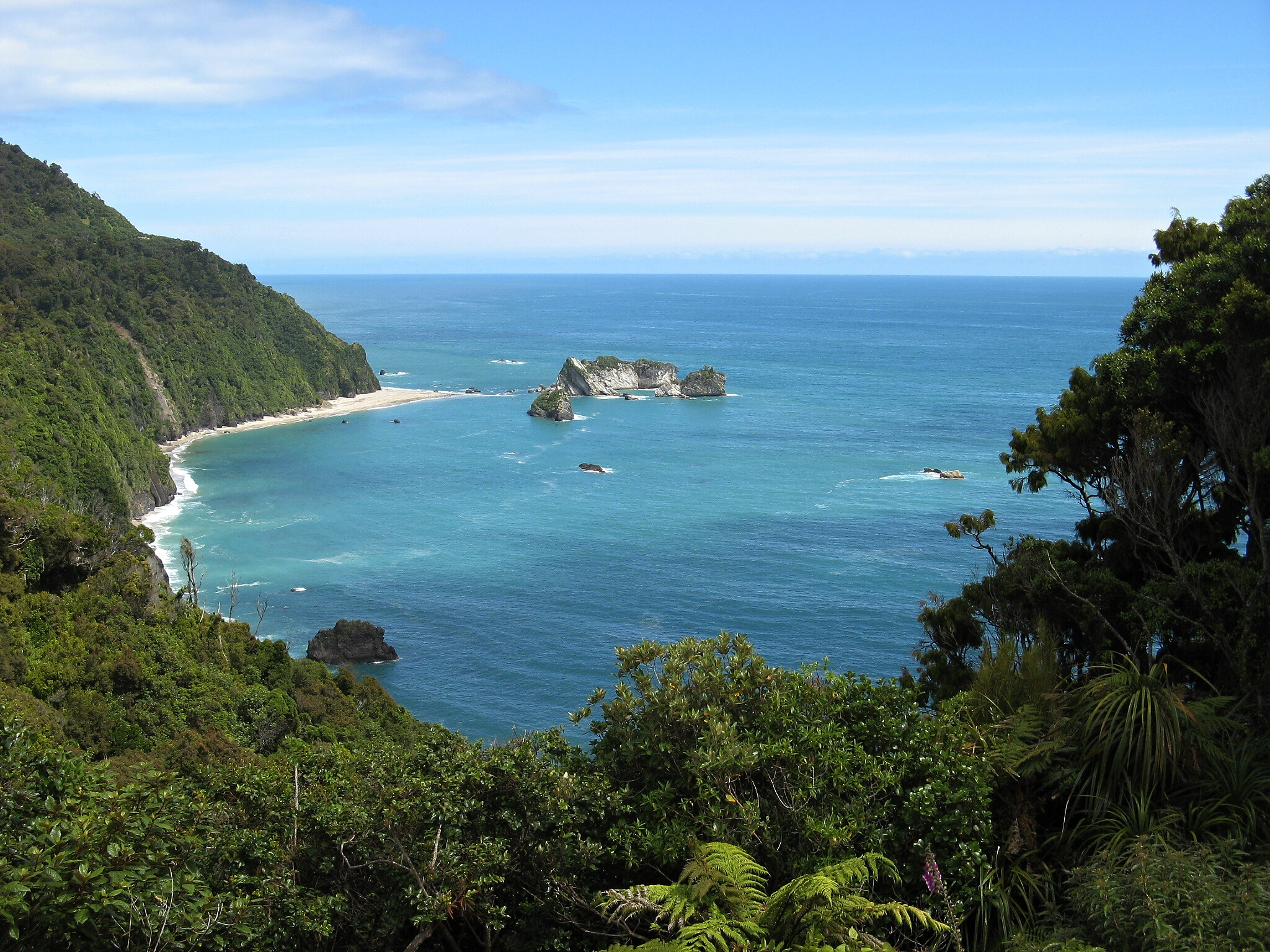
Rugged coastline of the West Coast Region of New Zealand

A coast (also called the coastline, shoreline, or seashore) is the land next to the sea or the line that forms the boundary between the land and the ocean. Coasts are influenced by the topography of the surrounding landscape and by aquatic erosion, such as that caused by waves. The geological composition of rock and soil dictates the type of shore that is created. Earth has about 620,000.0 km (385,250.1 mi) of coastline.

Coasts are important zones in natural ecosystems, often home to a wide range of biodiversity. On land, they harbor ecosystems, such as freshwater or estuarine wetlands, that are important for birds and other terrestrial animals. In wave-protected areas, coasts harbor salt marshes, mangroves, and seagrasses, all of which can provide nursery habitat for finfish, shellfish, and other aquatic animals. Rocky shores are usually found along exposed coasts and provide habitat for a wide range of sessile animals (e.g. mussels, starfish, barnacles) and various kinds of seaweeds.

In physical oceanography, a shore is the wider fringe that is geologically modified by the action of the body of water past and present, and the beach is at the edge of the shore, including the intertidal zone where there is one. Along tropical coasts with clear, nutrient-poor water, coral reefs can often be found at depths of 1–50 m (3.3–164.0 ft).

According to an atlas prepared by the United Nations, about 44% of the human population lives within 150 km (93 mi) of the sea as of 2013. Due to its importance in society and its high population concentrations, the coast is important for major parts of the global food and economic system, and they provide many ecosystem services to humankind. For example, important human activities happen in port cities. Coastal fisheries (commercial, recreational, and subsistence) and aquaculture are major economic activities and create jobs, livelihoods, and protein for the majority of coastal human populations. Other coastal spaces like beaches and seaside resorts generate large revenues through tourism.

Marine coastal ecosystems can also provide protection against sea level rise and tsunamis. In many countries, mangroves are the primary source of wood for fuel (e.g. charcoal) and building material. Coastal ecosystems like mangroves and seagrasses have a much higher capacity for carbon sequestration than many terrestrial ecosystems, and as such can play a critical role in the near-future to help mitigate climate change effects by uptake of atmospheric anthropogenic carbon dioxide.

However, the economic importance of coasts makes many of these communities vulnerable to climate change, which causes increases in extreme weather and sea level rise, as well as related issues like coastal erosion, saltwater intrusion, and coastal flooding. Other coastal issues, such as marine pollution, marine debris, coastal development, and marine ecosystem destruction, further complicate the human uses of the coast and threaten coastal ecosystems.

The interactive effects of climate change, habitat destruction, overfishing, and water pollution (especially eutrophication) have led to the demise of coastal ecosystem around the globe. This has resulted in population collapse of fisheries stocks, loss of biodiversity, increased invasion of alien species, and loss of healthy habitats. International attention to these issues has been captured in Sustainable Development Goal 14 "Life Below Water", which sets goals for international policy focused on preserving marine coastal ecosystems and supporting more sustainable economic practices for coastal communities. Likewise, the United Nations has declared 2021–2030 the UN Decade on Ecosystem Restoration, but restoration of coastal ecosystems has received insufficient attention.

Since coasts are constantly changing, a coastline's exact perimeter cannot be determined; this measurement challenge is called the coastline paradox. The term coastal zone is used to refer to a region where interactions of sea and land processes occur. Both the terms coast and coastal are often used to describe a geographic location or region located on a coastline (e.g., New Zealand's West Coast, or the East, West, and Gulf Coast of the United States.) Coasts with a narrow continental shelf that are close to the open ocean are called pelagic coast, while other coasts are more sheltered coast in a gulf or bay. A shore, on the other hand, may refer to parts of land adjoining any large body of water, including oceans (sea shore) and lakes (lake shore).

== Size ==
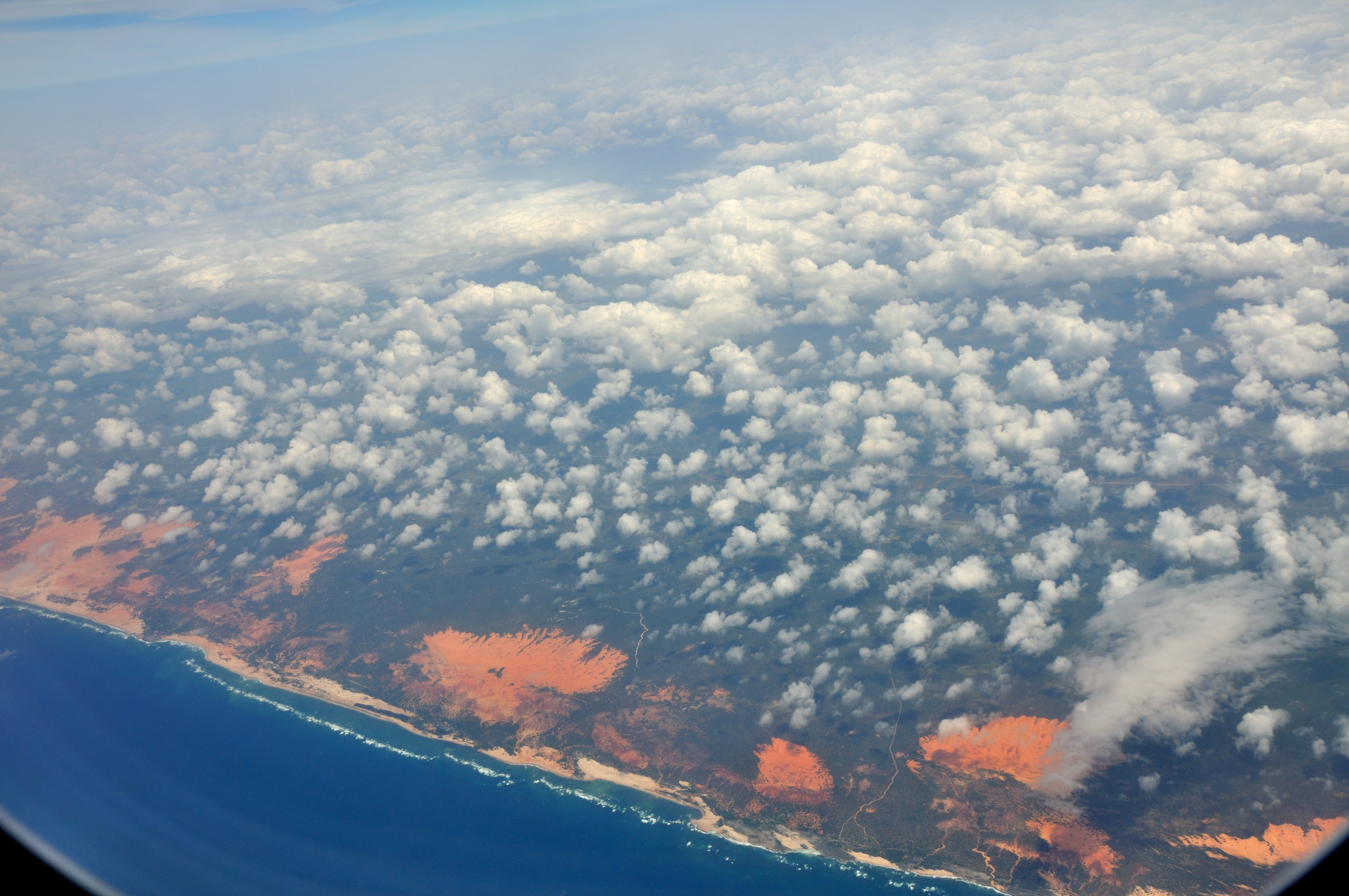
Somalia has the longest coastline in Africa.

The Earth has approximately 620,000 kilometres (390,000 mi) of coastline. Coastal habitats, which extend to the margins of the continental shelves, make up about 7 percent of the Earth's oceans, but at least 85% of commercially harvested fish depend on coastal environments during at least part of their life cycle. As of October 2010, about 2.86% of exclusive economic zones were part of marine protected areas.

The definition of coasts varies. Marine scientists think of the "wet" (aquatic or intertidal) vegetated habitats as being coastal ecosystems (including seagrass, salt marsh etc.) whilst some terrestrial scientists might only think of coastal ecosystems as purely terrestrial plants that live close to the seashore (see also estuaries and coastal ecosystems).

While there is general agreement in the scientific community regarding the definition of coast, in the political sphere, the delineation of the extents of a coast differ according to jurisdiction. Government authorities in various countries may define coast differently for economic and social policy reasons.

=== Challenges of precisely measuring the coastline ===
The coastline paradox is the counterintuitive observation that the coastline of a landmass does not have a well-defined length or perimeter. This results from the fractal curve–like properties of coastlines, namely the fact that a coastline typically has a fractal dimension. Although the "paradox of length" was previously noted by Hugo Steinhaus, the first systematic study of this phenomenon was by Lewis Fry Richardson, and it was expanded upon by Benoit Mandelbrot.

The measured length of the coastline depends on the method used to measure it and the degree of cartographic generalization. Since a landmass has features at all scales, from hundreds of kilometers in size to tiny fractions of a millimeter and below, there is no obvious size of the smallest feature that should be taken into consideration when measuring, and hence no single well-defined perimeter to the landmass. Various approximations, such as the Minkowski–Bouligand dimension, exist when specific assumptions are made about minimum feature size.

== Formation ==
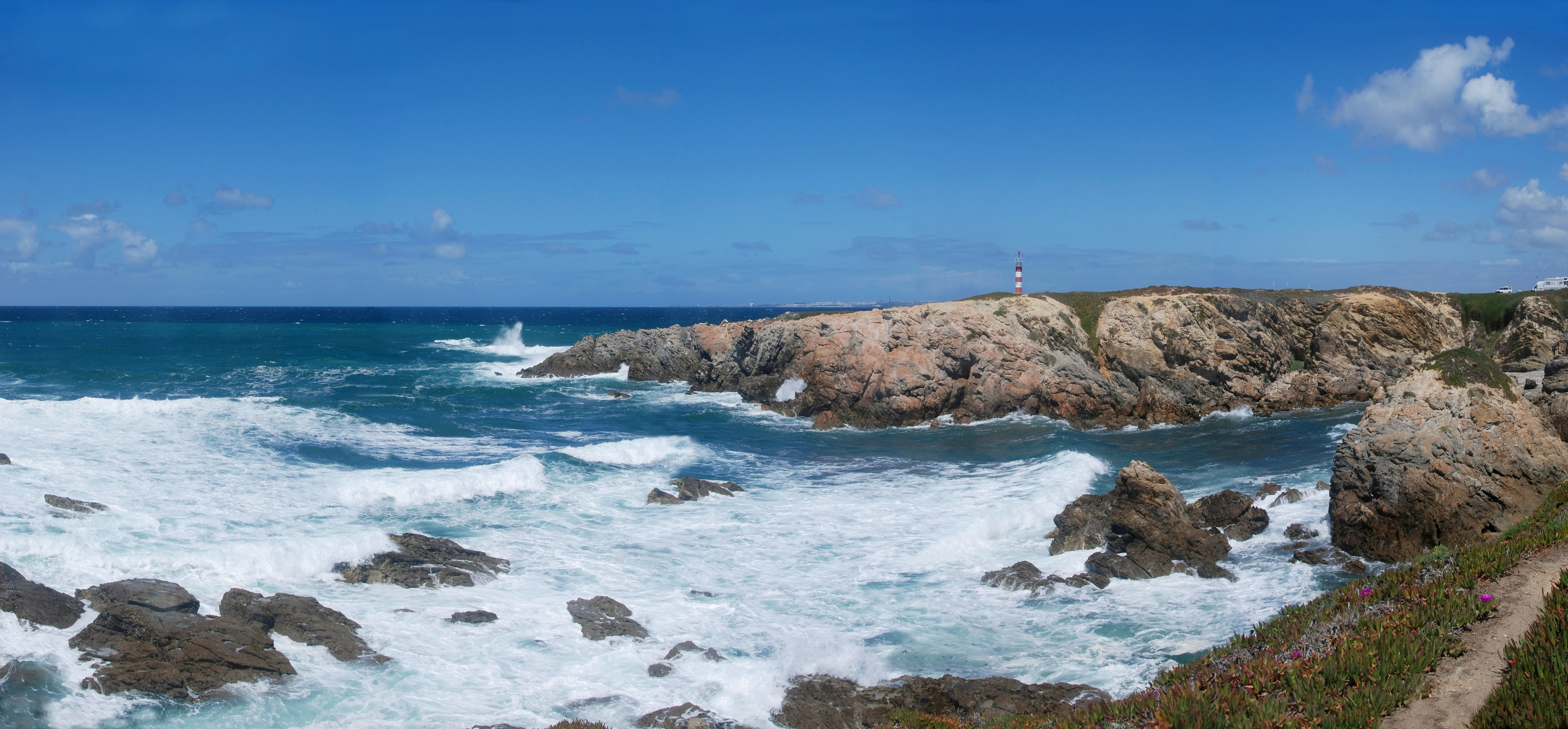
Atlantic rocky coastline, showing a surf area. Porto Covo, west coast of Portugal

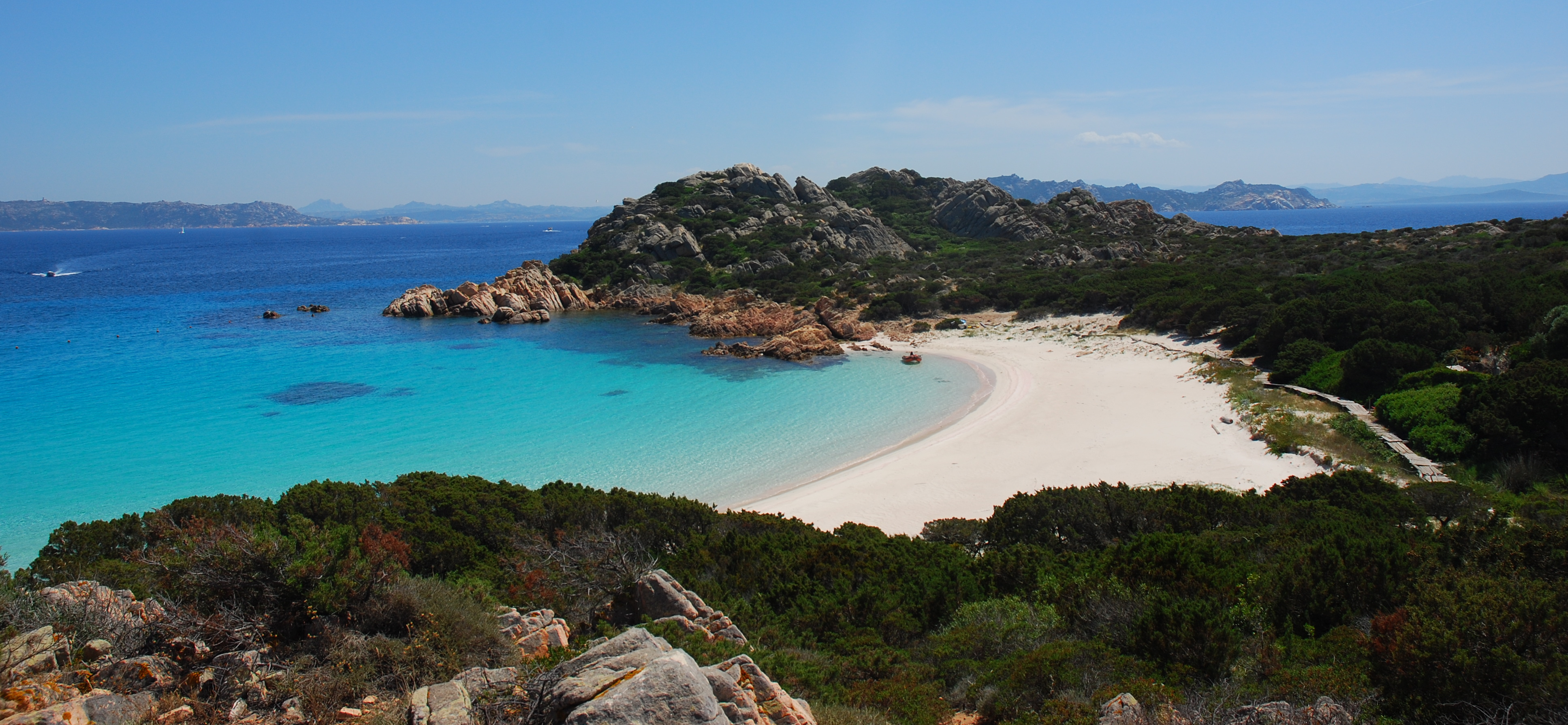
Seaside in Budelli, Italy. Budelli beach is famous for the color of its sand, which is pink due to the presence of fragments of a microorganism called Miniacina miniacea.

Tides often determine the range over which sediment is deposited or eroded. Areas with high tidal ranges allow waves to reach farther up the shore, and areas with lower tidal ranges produce deposition at a smaller elevation interval. The tidal range is influenced by the size and shape of the coastline. Tides do not typically cause erosion by themselves; however, tidal bores can erode as the waves surge up the river estuaries from the ocean.

Geologists classify coasts on the basis of tidal range into macrotidal coasts with a tidal range greater than 4 m (13 ft); mesotidal coasts with a tidal range of 2 to 4 m (6.6 to 13 ft); and microtidal coasts with a tidal range of less than 2 m (7 ft). The distinction between macrotidal and mesotidal coasts is more important. Macrotidal coasts lack barrier islands and lagoons, and are characterized by funnel-shaped estuaries containing sand ridges aligned with tidal currents. Wave action is much more important for determining bedforms of sediments deposited along mesotidal and microtidal coasts than in macrotidal coasts.

Waves erode coastline as they break on shore releasing their energy; the larger the wave the more energy it releases and the more sediment it moves. Coastlines with longer shores have more room for the waves to disperse their energy, while coasts with cliffs and short shore faces give little room for the wave energy to be dispersed. In these areas, the wave energy breaking against the cliffs is higher, and air and water are compressed into cracks in the rock, forcing the rock apart, breaking it down. Sediment deposited by waves comes from eroded cliff faces and is moved along the coastline by the waves. This forms an abrasion or cliffed coast.

Sediment deposited by rivers is the dominant influence on the amount of sediment located in the case of coastlines that have estuaries. Today, riverine deposition at the coast is often blocked by dams and other human regulatory devices, which remove the sediment from the stream by causing it to be deposited inland. Coral reefs are a provider of sediment for coastlines of tropical islands.

Like the ocean which shapes them, coasts are a dynamic environment with constant change. The Earth's natural processes, particularly sea level rises, waves and various weather phenomena, have resulted in the erosion, accretion and reshaping of coasts as well as flooding and creation of continental shelves and drowned river valleys (rias).

== Importance for humans and ecosystems ==
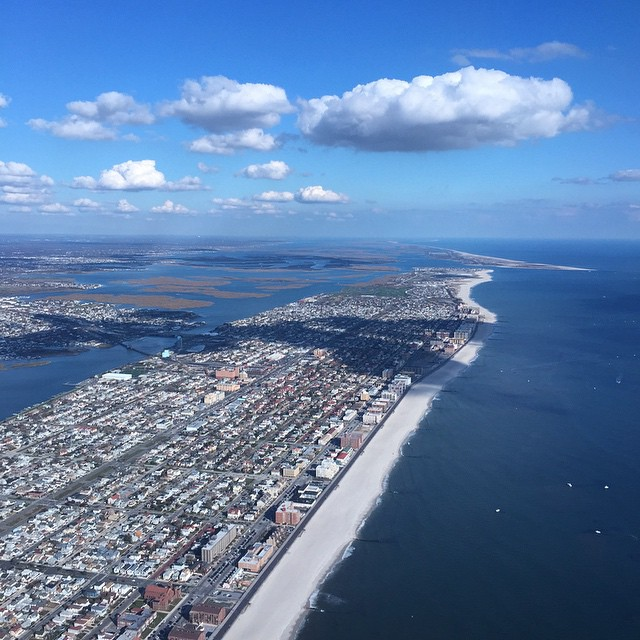
Aerial view of densely populated Long Beach, New York and environs on the South Shore of Long Island, U.S., as seen from the west-by-southwest

=== Human settlements ===
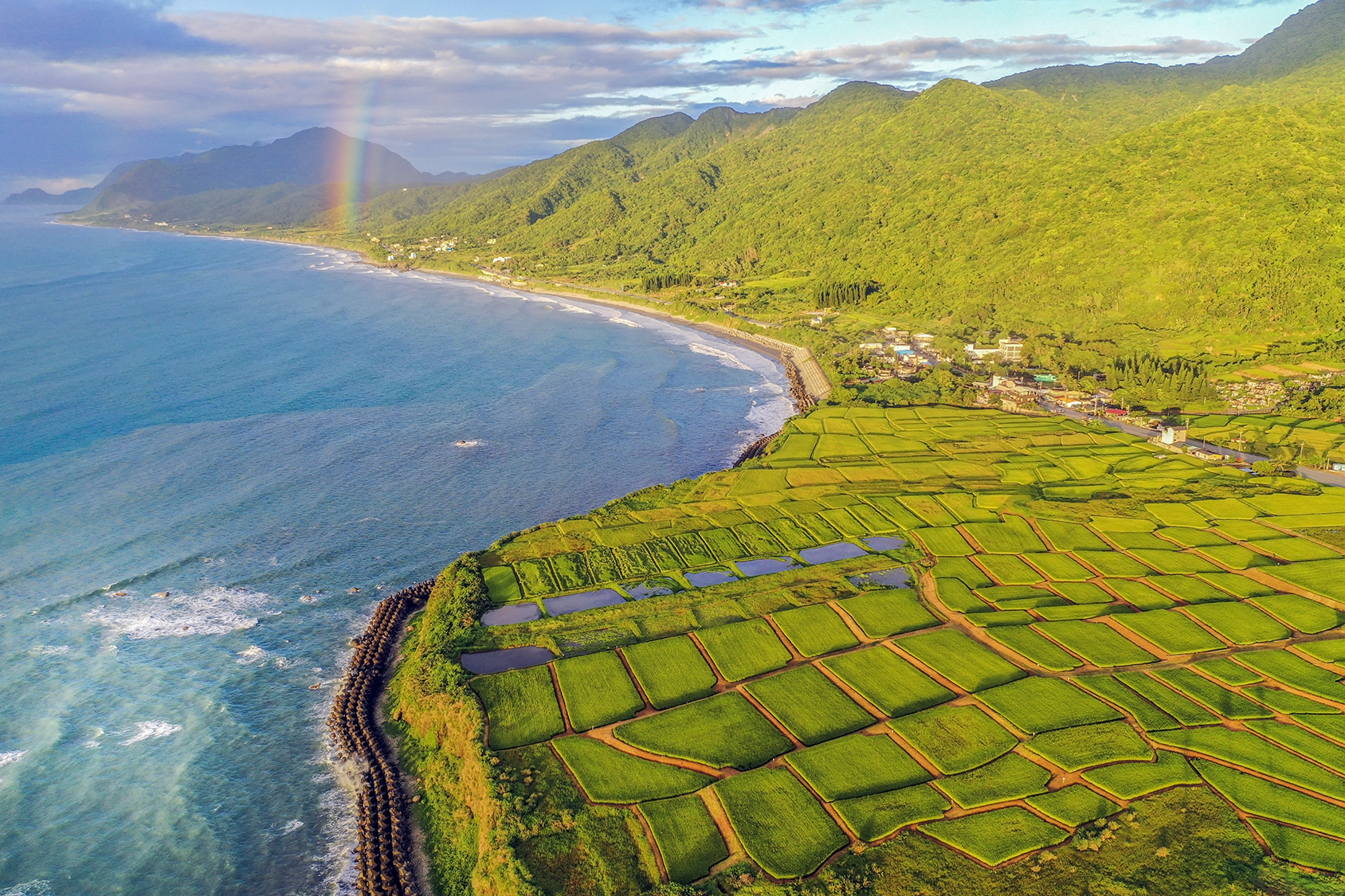
Paddy fields by the coast of Fengbin, Hualien, Taiwan

More and more of the world's people live in coastal regions. According to a United Nations atlas, 44% of all people live within 150 km (93 mi) of the sea. Many major cities are on or near good harbors and have port facilities. Some landlocked places have achieved port status by building canals.

Nations defend their coasts against military invaders, smugglers and illegal migrants. Fixed coastal defenses have long been erected in many nations, and coastal countries typically have a navy and some form of coast guard.

==== Tourism ====
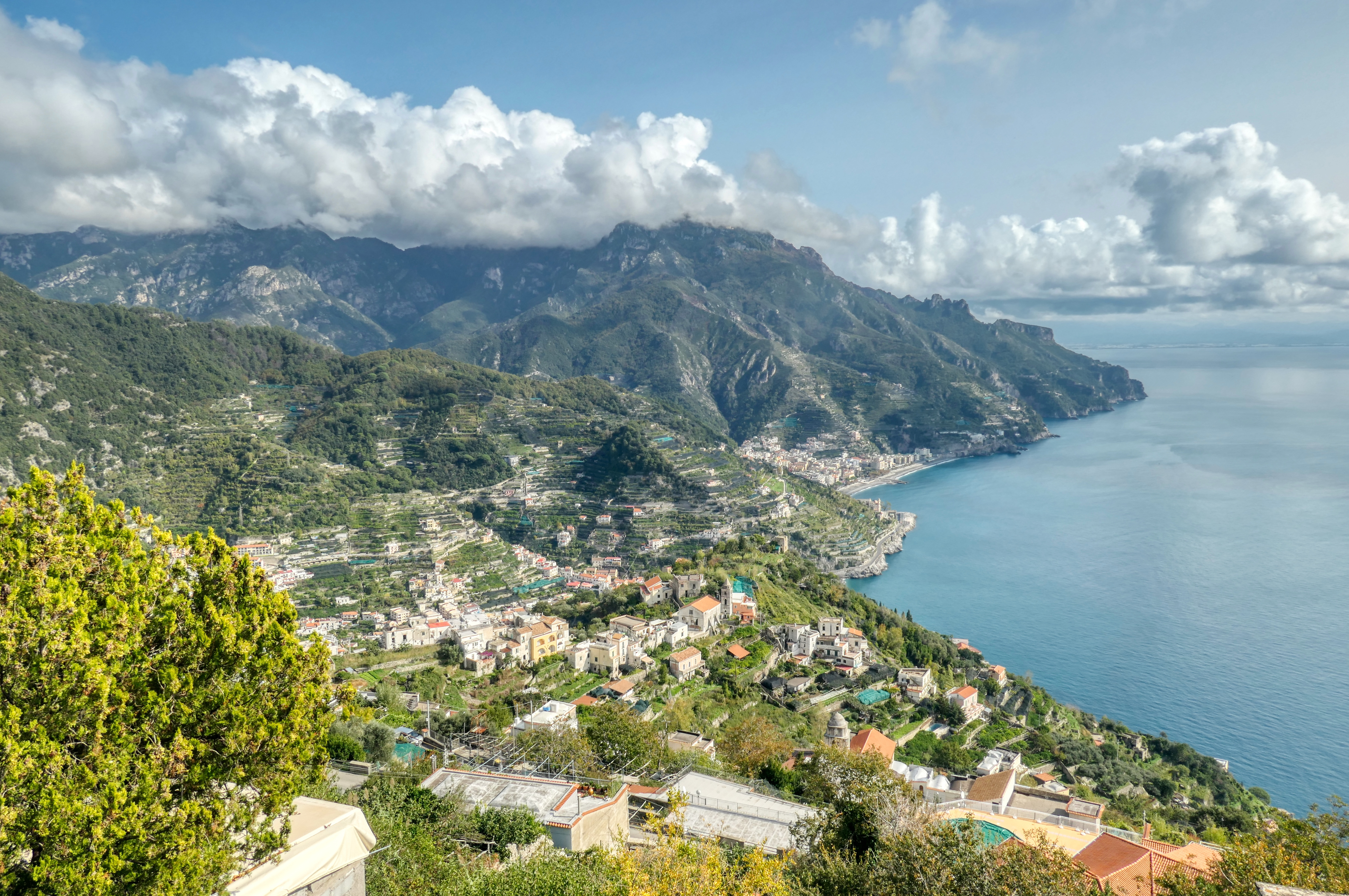
Amalfi Coast, Italy, attracts international tourists of all classes annually and is listed as a UNESCO World Heritage Site.

Coasts, especially those with beaches and warm water, attract tourists, often leading to the development of seaside resort communities. In many island nations such as those of the Mediterranean, South Pacific Ocean and Caribbean, tourism is central to the economy. Coasts offer recreational activities such as swimming, fishing, surfing, boating, and sunbathing.

The Coastal Hazard Wheel system published by UNEP for global coastal management

Growth management and coastal management can be a challenge for coastal local authorities who often struggle to provide the protective infrastructure required by new residents, and poor management practices of construction often leave these communities and infrastructure vulnerable to processes like coastal erosion and sea level rise. In many of these communities, management practices such as beach nourishment or when the coastal infrastructure is no longer financially sustainable, managed retreat to remove communities from the coast.′

=== Ecosystem services ===
Estuarine and marine coastal ecosystems are both marine ecosystems. Together, these ecosystems perform the four categories of ecosystem services in a variety of ways: The provisioning services include forest products, marine products, fresh water, raw materials, biochemical and genetic resources. Regulating services include carbon sequestration (contributing to climate change mitigation) as well as waste treatment and disease regulation and buffer zones. Supporting services of coastal ecosystems include nutrient cycling, biologically mediated habitats and primary production. Cultural services of coastal ecosystems include inspirational aspects, recreation and tourism, science and education.

Coasts and their adjacent areas on and offshore are an important part of a local ecosystem. The mixture of fresh water and salt water (brackish water) in estuaries provides many nutrients for marine life. Salt marshes, mangroves and beaches also support a diversity of plants, animals and insects crucial to the food chain. The high level of biodiversity creates a high level of biological activity, which has attracted human activity for thousands of years. Coasts also create essential material for organisms to live by, including estuaries, wetland, seagrass, coral reefs, and mangroves. Coasts provide habitats for migratory birds, sea turtles, marine mammals, and coral reefs.

== Types ==
=== Emergent coastline ===
According to one principle of classification, an emergent coastline is a coastline that has experienced a fall in sea level, because of either a global sea-level change, or local uplift. Emergent coastlines are identifiable by the coastal landforms, which are above the high tide mark, such as raised beaches. In contrast, a submergent coastline is one where the sea level has risen, due to a global sea-level change, local subsidence, or isostatic rebound. Submergent coastlines are identifiable by their submerged, or "drowned" landforms, such as rias (drowned valleys) and fjords

=== Concordant coastline ===
According to the second principle of classification, a concordant coastline is a coastline where bands of different rock types run parallel to the shore. These rock types are usually of varying resistance, so the coastline forms distinctive landforms, such as coves. Discordant coastlines feature distinctive landforms because the rocks are eroded by the ocean waves. The less resistant rocks erode faster, creating inlets or bay; the more resistant rocks erode more slowly, remaining as headlands or outcroppings.

=== High and low energy coasts ===
Parts of a coastline can be categorised as high energy coast or low energy coast. The distinguishing characteristics of a high energy coast are that the average wave energy is relatively high so that erosion of small grained material tends to exceed deposition, and consequently landforms like cliffs, headlands and wave-cut terraces develop. Low energy coasts are generally sheltered from waves, or in regions where the average wind wave and swell conditions are relatively mild. Low energy coasts typically change slowly, and tend to be depositional environments.

High energy coasts are exposed to the direct impact of waves and storms, and are generally erosional environments. High energy storm events can make large changes to a coastline, and can move significant amounts of sediment over a short period, sometimes changing a shoreline configuration.

==== Destructive and constructive waves ====
Swash is the shoreward flow after the break, backwash is the water flow back down the beach. The relative strength of flow in the swash and backwash determines what size grains are deposited or eroded. This is dependent on how the wave breaks and the slope of the shore. Depending on the form of the breaking wave, its energy can carry granular material up the beach and deposit it, or erode it by carrying more material down the slope than up it. Steep waves that are close together and break with the surf plunging down onto the shore slope expend much of their energy lifting the sediment. The weak swash does not carry it far up the slope, and the strong backwash carries it further down the slope, where it either settles in deeper water or is carried along the shore by a longshore current induced by an angled approach of the wave-front to the shore. These waves which erode the beach are called destructive waves. Low waves that are further apart and break by spilling, expend more of their energy in the swash which carries particles up the beach, leaving less energy for the backwash to transport them downslope, with a net constrictive influence on the beach.

=== Rivieras ===
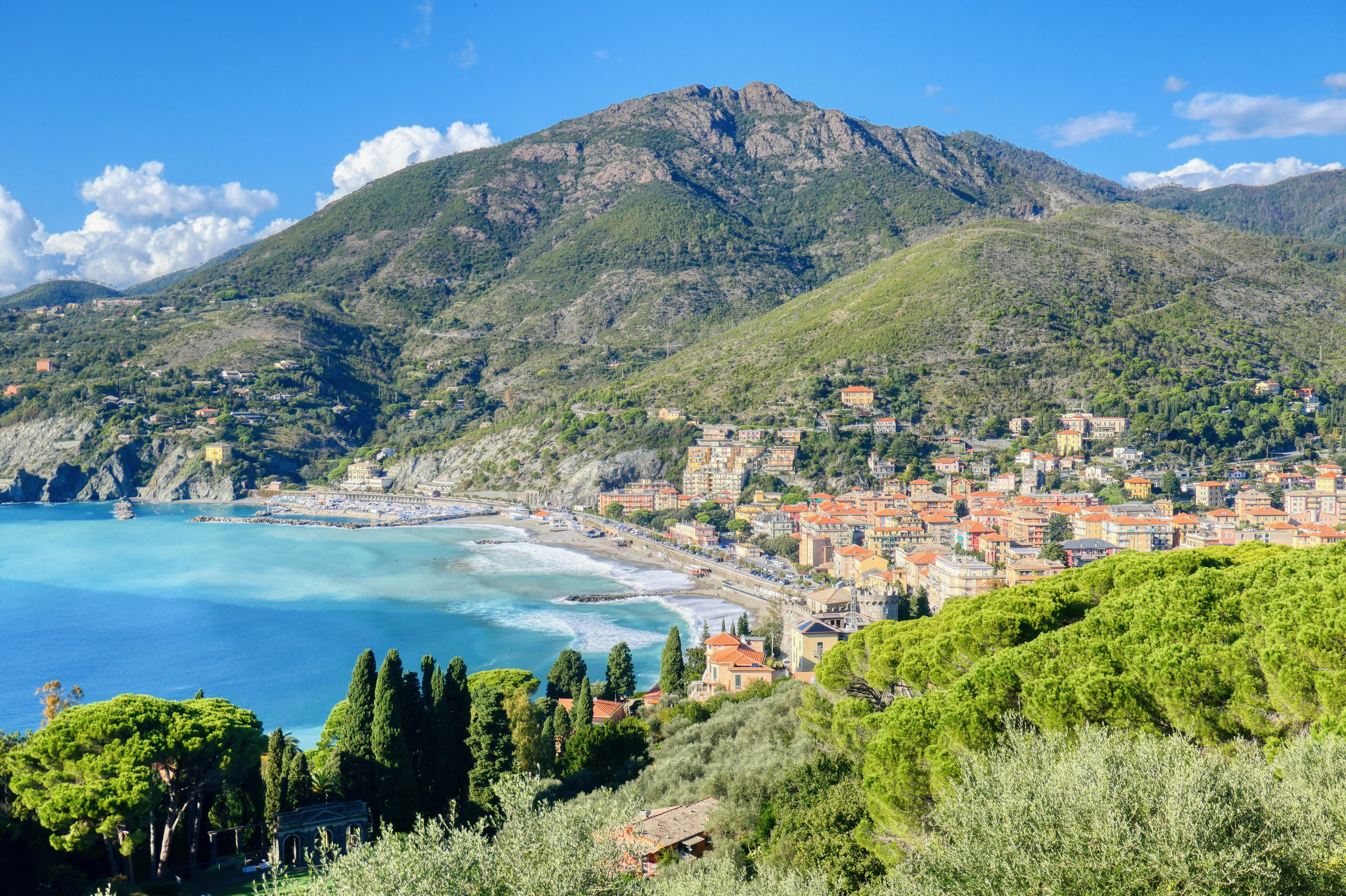
The Cinque Terre, along the Italian Riviera

Riviera is an Italian word for "shoreline", ultimately derived from Latin ripa ("riverbank"). It came to be applied as a proper name to the coast of the Ligurian Sea, in the form riviera ligure, then shortened to riviera. Historically, the Ligurian Riviera extended from Capo Corvo (Punta Bianca) south of Genoa, north and west into what is now French territory past Monaco and sometimes as far as Marseille. Today, this coast is divided into the Italian Riviera and the French Riviera, although the French use the term "Riviera" to refer to the Italian Riviera and call the French portion the "Côte d'Azur".

As a result of the fame of the Ligurian rivieras, the term came into English to refer to any shoreline, especially one that is sunny, topographically diverse and popular with tourists. Such places using the term include the Australian Riviera in Queensland and the Turkish Riviera along the Aegean Sea.

=== Other coastal categories ===
- A cliffed coast or abrasion coast is one where marine action has produced steep declivities known as cliffs.
- A flat coast is one where the land gradually descends into the sea.
- A graded shoreline is one where wind and water action has produced a flat and straight coastline.
- A primary coast isone which is mainly undergoing early stage development by major long-term processes such as tectonism and climate change A secondary coast is one where the primary processes have mostly stabilised, and more localised processes have become prominent.
- An erosional coast is on average undergoing erosion, while a depositional coast is accumulating material.
- An active coast is on the edge of a tectonic plate, while a passive coast is usually on a substantial continental shelf or away from a plate edge.

== Landforms ==
The following articles describe some coastal landforms:

Coastal landforms. The feature shown here as a bay would, in certain (mainly southern) parts of Britain, be called a cove. That between the cuspate foreland and the tombolo is a British bay.

- Barrier island
- Bay
- Cove
- Headland
- Peninsula

=== Cliff erosion ===
- Much of the sediment deposited along a coast is the result of erosion of a surrounding cliff, or bluff. Sea cliffs retreat landward because of the constant undercutting of slopes by waves. If the slope/cliff being undercut is made of unconsolidated sediment it will erode at a much faster rate than a cliff made of bedrock.
- A natural arch is formed when a headland is eroded through by waves.
- Sea caves are made when certain rock beds are more susceptible to erosion than the surrounding rock beds because of different areas of weakness. These areas are eroded at a faster pace, creating a hole or crevice that, through time, by means of wave action and erosion, becomes a cave.
- A stack is formed when a headland is eroded by wave and wind action or an arch collapses leaving an offshore remnant.
- A stump is a shortened sea stack that has been eroded or fallen because of instability.
- Wave-cut notches are caused by the undercutting of overhanging slopes, which leads to increased stress on cliff material and a greater probability that the slope material will fall. The fallen debris accumulates at the bottom of the cliff and is eventually removed by waves.
- A wave-cut platform forms after erosion and retreat of a sea cliff has been occurring for a long time. Gently sloping wave-cut platforms develop early on in the first stages of cliff retreat. Later, the length of the platform decreases because the waves lose their energy as they break further offshore.

=== Coastal features formed by sediment ===
- Beach
- Beach cusps
- Cuspate foreland
- Dune system
- Mudflat
- Raised beach
- Ria
- Shoal
- Spit
- Strand plain
- Surge channel
- Tombolo

=== Coastal features formed by another feature ===
- Estuary
- Lagoon
- Salt marsh
- Mangrove forests
- Kelp forests
- Coral reefs
- Oyster reefs

=== Other features on the coast ===
- Concordant coastline
- Discordant coastline
- Fjord
- Island
- Island arc
- Machair

== Coastal waters ==
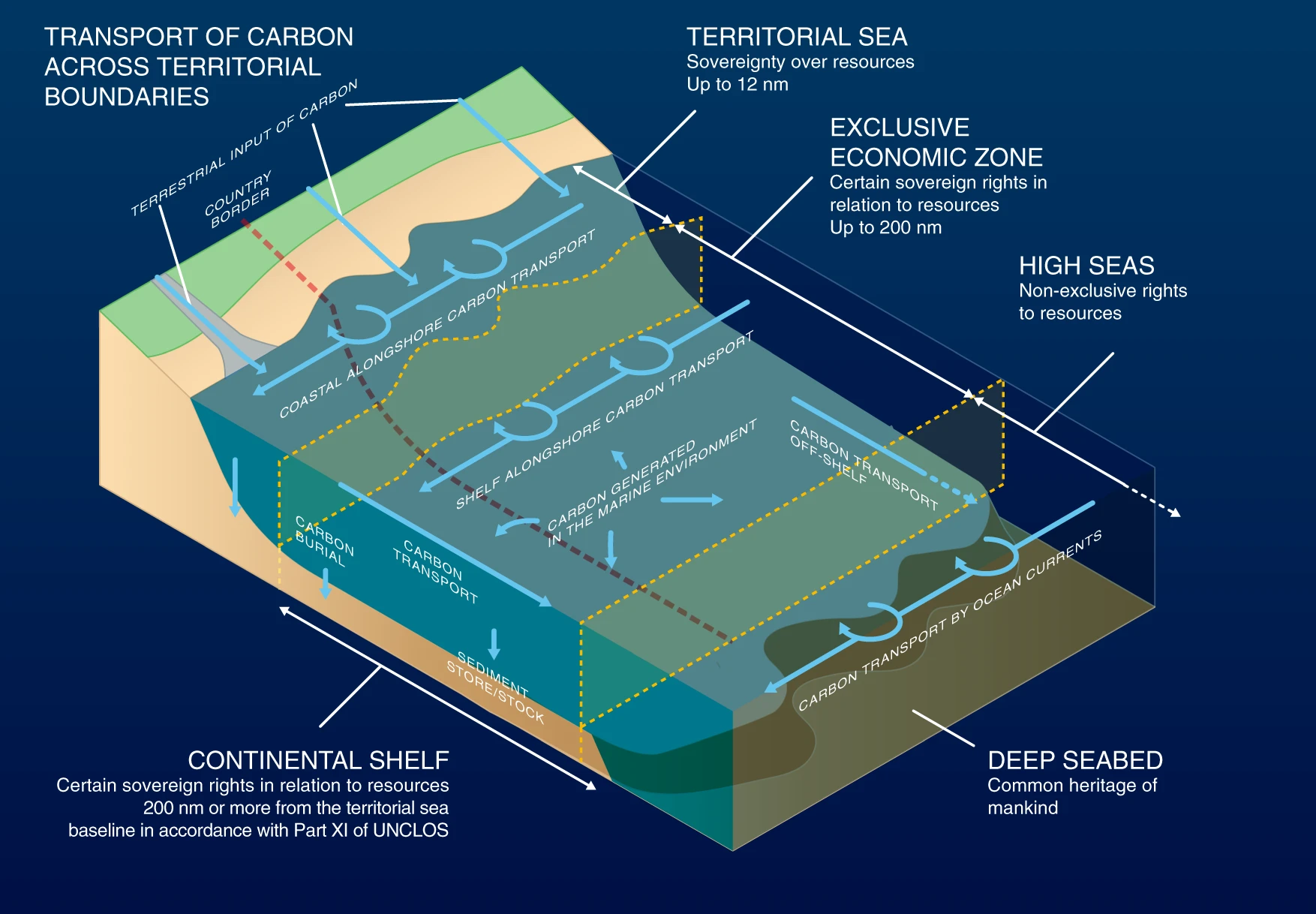
Overview of different zones of coastal waters: Input, production, transport and storage pathway of carbon in marine waters, including movement across maritime zones of national jurisdiction: territorial sea, Exclusive Economic Zone (EEZ), continental shelf, high seas (international waters), and deep seabed.

"Coastal waters" (or "coastal seas") is a term that carries different meanings depending upon the context, ranging from a geographic reference to the waters within a few kilometers of the coast, to describing the entire continental shelf that may stretch for more than a hundred kilometers from land. The term is used in a different manner when describing legal and economic boundaries, such as territorial waters and international waters, or when describing the geography of coastal landforms or the ecological systems operating through the continental shelf (marine coastal ecosystems).

The dynamic fluid nature of the ocean means that all components of the whole ocean system are ultimately connected, although certain regional classifications are useful and relevant. The waters of the continental shelves represent such a region. The term "coastal waters" has been used in a wide variety of different ways in different contexts. In European Union environmental management it extends from the coast to just a few nautical miles while in the United States the US EPA considers this region to extend much further offshore.

"Coastal waters" has specific meanings in the context of commercial coastal shipping, and somewhat different meanings in the context of naval littoral warfare. Oceanographers and marine biologists have yet other takes. Coastal waters have a wide range of marine habitats from enclosed estuaries to the open waters of the continental shelf.

Similarly, the term littoral zone has no single definition. It is the part of a sea, lake, or river that is close to the shore. In coastal environments, the littoral zone extends from the high water mark, which is rarely inundated, to shoreline areas that are permanently submerged.

Coastal waters can be threatened by coastal eutrophication and harmful algal blooms.

== In geology ==
The identification of bodies of rock formed from sediments deposited in shoreline and nearshore environments (shoreline and nearshore facies) is extremely important to geologists. These provide vital clues for reconstructing the geography of ancient continents (paleogeography). The locations of these beds show the extent of ancient seas at particular points in geological time, and provide clues to the magnitudes of tides in the distant past.

Sediments deposited in the shoreface are preserved as lenses of sandstone in which the upper part of the sandstone is coarser than the lower part (a coarsening upwards sequence). Geologists refer to these are parasequences. Each records an episode of retreat of the ocean from the shoreline over a period of 10,000 to 1,000,000 years. These often show laminations reflecting various kinds of tidal cycles.

Some of the best-studied shoreline deposits in the world are found along the former western shore of the Western Interior Seaway, a shallow sea that flooded central North America during the late Cretaceous Period (about 100 to 66 million years ago). These are beautifully exposed along the Book Cliffs of Utah and Colorado.

=== Geologic processes ===
The following articles describe the various geologic processes that affect a coastal zone:

- Attrition
- Currents
- Denudation
- Deposition
- Erosion
- Flooding
- Longshore drift
- Marine sediments
- Saltation
- Sea level change
  - eustatic
  - isostatic
- Sedimentation
- Coastal sediment supply
  - sediment transport
  - solution
  - subaerial processes
  - suspension
- Tides
- Water waves
  - diffraction
  - refraction
  - wave breaking
  - wave shoaling
- Weathering

== Wildlife ==
=== Animals ===
Larger animals that live in coastal areas include puffins, sea turtles and rockhopper penguins, among many others. Sea snails and various kinds of barnacles live on rocky coasts and scavenge on food deposited by the sea. Some coastal animals are used to humans in developed areas, such as dolphins and seagulls who eat food thrown for them by tourists. Since the coastal areas are all part of the littoral zone, there is a profusion of marine life found just off-coast, including sessile animals such as corals, sponges, starfish, mussels, seaweeds, fishes, and sea anemones.

There are many kinds of seabirds on various coasts. These include pelicans and cormorants, who join up with terns and oystercatchers to forage for fish and shellfish. There are sea lions on the coast of Wales and other countries.

==== Coastal fish ====
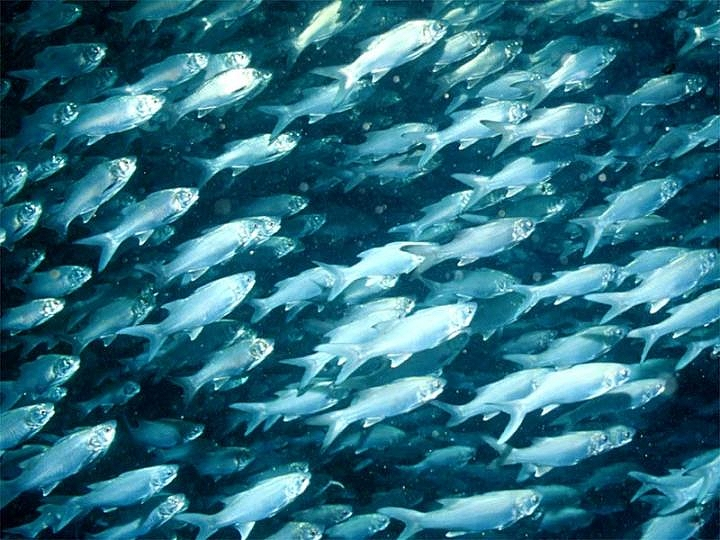
Schooling threadfin, a coastal species

Coastal fish, also called inshore fish or neritic fish, inhabit the sea between the shoreline and the edge of the continental shelf. Since the continental shelf is usually less than 200 metres (660 ft) deep, it follows that pelagic coastal fish are generally epipelagic fish, inhabiting the sunlit epipelagic zone. Coastal fish can be contrasted with oceanic fish or offshore fish, which inhabit the deep seas beyond the continental shelves.

Coastal fish are the most abundant in the world. They can be found in tidal pools, fjords and estuaries, near sandy shores and rocky coastlines, around coral reefs and on or above the continental shelf. Coastal fish include forage fish and the predator fish that feed on them. Forage fish thrive in inshore waters where high productivity results from upwelling and shoreline run off of nutrients. Some are partial residents that spawn in streams, estuaries and bays, but most complete their life cycles in the zone.

=== Plants ===
Many coastal areas are famous for their kelp beds. Kelp is a fast-growing seaweed that can grow up to half a meter a day in ideal conditions. Mangroves, seagrasses, macroalgal beds, and salt marsh are important coastal vegetation types in tropical and temperate environments respectively. Restinga is another type of coastal vegetation.

== Threats ==
Coasts also face many human-induced environmental impacts and coastal development hazards. The most important ones are:

- Pollution which can be in the form of water pollution, nutrient pollution (leading to coastal eutrophication and harmful algal blooms), oil spills or marine debris that is contaminating coasts with plastic and other trash.
- Sea level rise, and associated issues like coastal erosion and saltwater intrusion.

=== Pollution ===
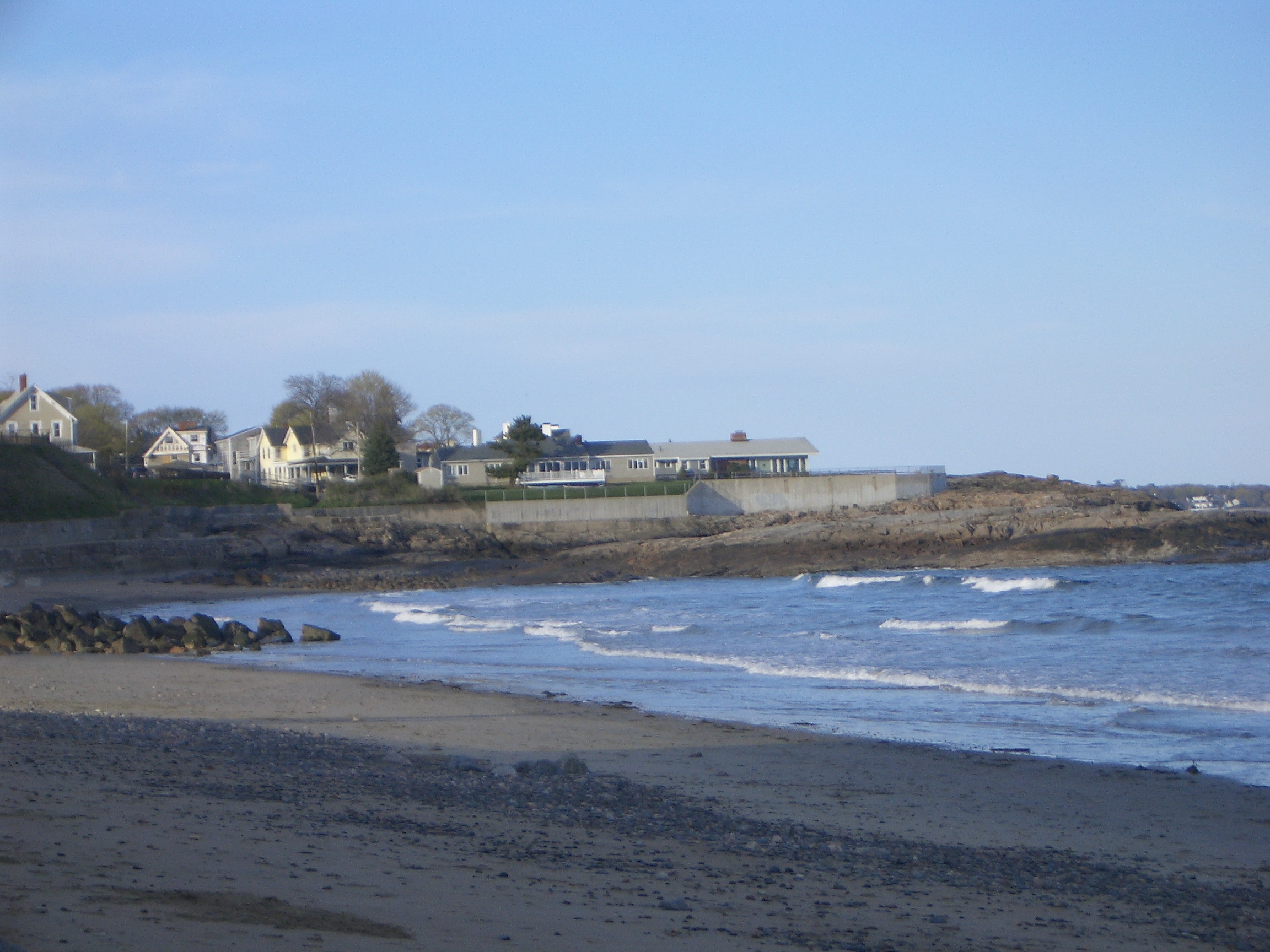
A settled coastline in Marblehead, Massachusetts. Once a fishing port, the harbor is now dedicated to tourism and pleasure boating. Observe that the sand and rocks have been darkened by oil slick up to the high-water line.

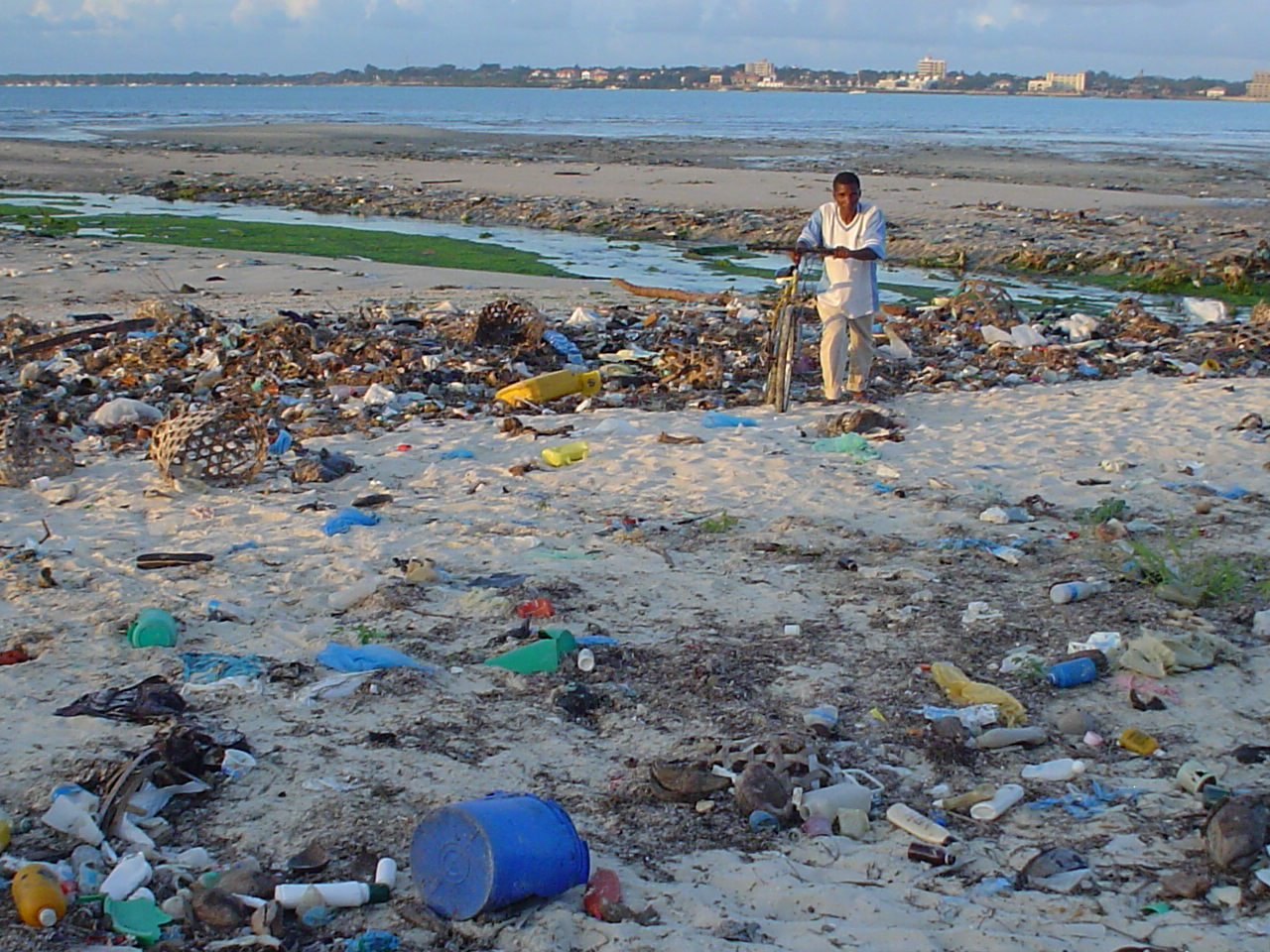
This stretch of coast in Tanzania's capital Dar es Salaam serves as a public waste dump.

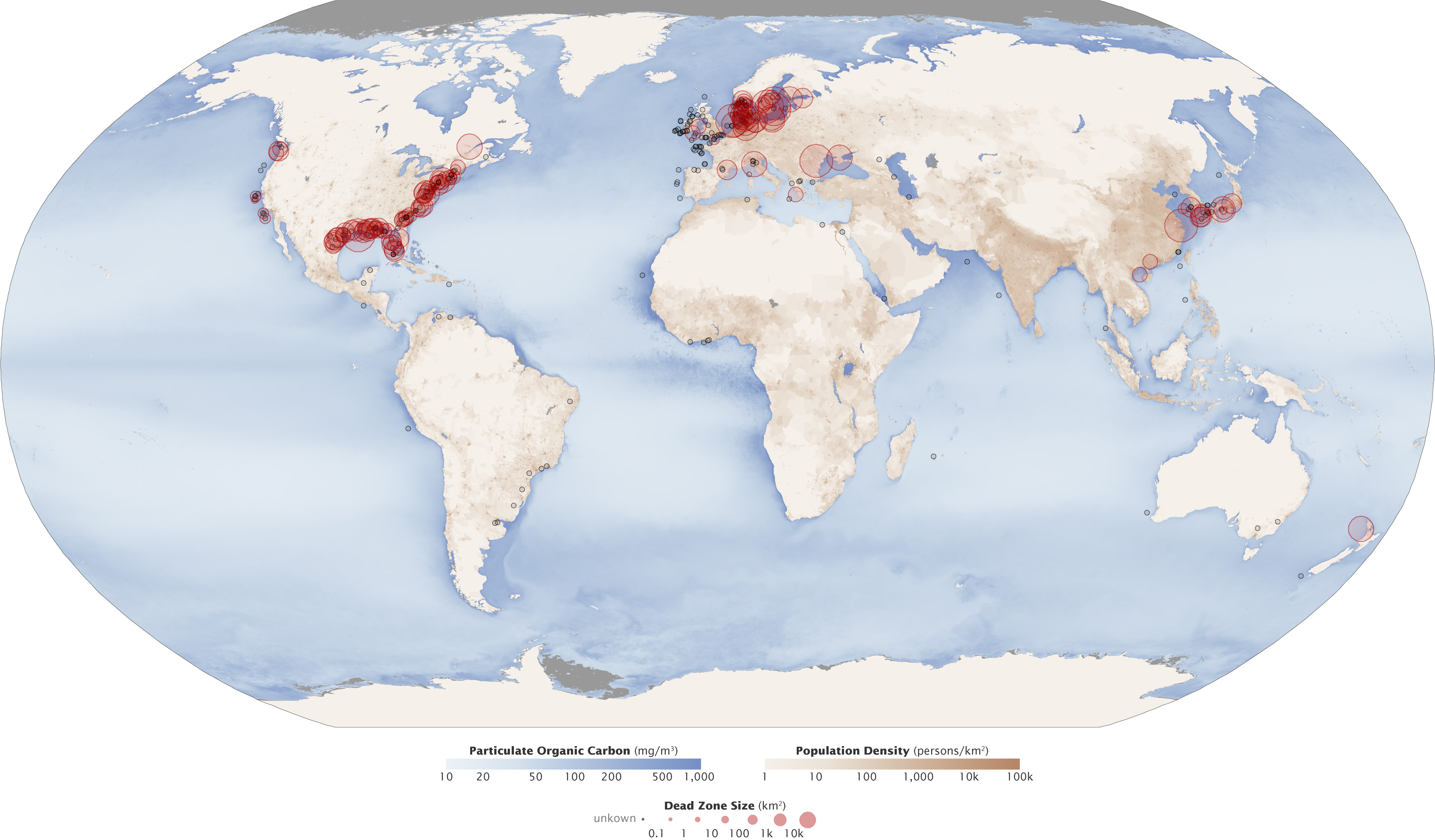
Dead zones occur when phosphorus and nitrogen from fertilizers cause excessive growth of microorganisms, which depletes oxygen and kills fauna.

The pollution of coastlines is connected to marine pollution which can occur from a number of sources: Marine debris (garbage and industrial debris); the transportation of petroleum in tankers, increasing the probability of large oil spills; small oil spills created by large and small vessels, which flush bilge water into the ocean.

==== Marine pollution ====
Marine pollution occurs when substances used or spread by humans, such as industrial, agricultural, and residential waste; particles; noise or light; excess carbon dioxide; or invasive organisms enter the ocean and cause harmful effects there. The majority of this waste (80%) comes from land-based activity, although marine transportation significantly contributes as well. It is a combination of chemicals and trash, most of which comes from land sources and is washed or blown into the ocean. This pollution results in damage to the environment, to the health of all organisms, and to economic structures worldwide. Since most inputs come from land, via rivers, sewage, or the atmosphere, it means that continental shelves are more vulnerable to pollution. Air pollution is also a contributing factor, as it carries iron, carbonic acid, nitrogen, silicon, sulfur, pesticides, and dust particles into the ocean. The pollution often comes from nonpoint sources such as agricultural runoff, wind-blown debris, and dust. These nonpoint sources are largely due to runoff that enters the ocean through rivers, but wind-blown debris and dust can also play a role, as these pollutants can settle into waterways and oceans. Pathways of pollution include direct discharge, land runoff, ship pollution, bilge pollution, dredging (which can create dredge plumes), atmospheric pollution and, potentially, deep sea mining.

Different types of marine pollution can be grouped as pollution from marine debris, plastic pollution, including microplastics, ocean acidification, nutrient pollution, toxins, and underwater noise. Plastic pollution in the ocean is a type of marine pollution by plastics, ranging in size from large original materials such as bottles and bags, down to microplastics formed from the fragmentation of plastic materials. Marine debris is mainly discarded human rubbish that floats on or is suspended in the ocean. Plastic pollution is harmful to marine life.

==== Marine debris ====
Marine debris, also known as marine litter, is human-created solid material that has deliberately or accidentally been released in seas or the ocean. Floating oceanic debris tends to accumulate at the center of gyres and on coastlines, frequently washing aground, when it is known as beach litter or tidewrack. Deliberate disposal of wastes at sea is called ocean dumping. Naturally occurring debris, such as driftwood and drift seeds, are also present. With the increasing use of plastic, human influence has become an issue as many types of (petrochemical) plastics do not biodegrade quickly, as would natural or organic materials. The largest single type of plastic pollution (~10%) and majority of large plastic in the oceans is discarded and lost nets from the fishing industry. Waterborne plastic poses a serious threat to fish, seabirds, marine reptiles, and marine mammals, as well as to boats and coasts.

Dumping, container spillages, litter washed into storm drains and waterways and wind-blown landfill waste all contribute to this problem. This increased water pollution has caused serious negative effects such as discarded fishing nets capturing animals, concentration of plastic debris in massive marine garbage patches, and increasing concentrations of contaminants in the food chain.

==== Microplastics ====
A growing concern regarding plastic pollution in the marine ecosystem is the use of microplastics. Microplastics are beads of plastic less than 5 millimeters wide, and they are commonly found in hand soaps, face cleansers, and other exfoliators. When these products are used, the microplastics go through the water filtration system and into the ocean, but because of their small size they are likely to escape capture by the preliminary treatment screens on wastewater plants. These beads are harmful to the organisms in the ocean, especially filter feeders, because they can easily ingest the plastic and become sick. The microplastics are such a concern because it is difficult to clean them up due to their size, so humans can try to avoid using these harmful plastics by purchasing products that use environmentally safe exfoliates.

=== Sea level rise due to climate change ===
The sea level has generally been rising since the end of the Last Glacial Maximum, which was around 20,000 years ago. Between 1901 and 2018, the global average sea level rose by 15–25 cm (6–10 in), with an increase of 2.3 mm (0.091 in) per year since the 1970s. This was faster than the sea level had ever risen over at least the past 3,000 years. The rate accelerated to 4.62 mm (0.182 in)/yr for the decade 2013–2022. Climate change due to human activities is the main cause of this persistent acceleration. Between 1993 and 2018, melting ice sheets and glaciers accounted for 44% of sea level rise, with another 42% resulting from thermal expansion of water.

Sea level rise lags behind changes in the Earth's temperature by decades, and sea level rise will therefore continue to accelerate between now and 2050 in response to warming that has already happened. What happens after that depends on future human greenhouse gas emissions. According to modelling in the early 2020s, if there are very deep cuts in emissions, sea level rise would slow down between 2050 and 2100. In that scenario, it would rise by between 30 cm (1 ft) and 1.0 m (3 1/3 ft) between the early 2020s and 2100, or by approximately 60 cm (2 ft) to 130 cm (4 1/2 ft) from the 19th century to 2100. With high emissions it would instead accelerate further, and could rise by 50 cm (1.6 ft) or even by 1.9 m (6.2 ft) by 2100. In the long run, sea level rise would amount to 2–3 m (7–10 ft) over the next 2000 years if warming stays to its current 1.5 °C (2.7 °F) over the pre-industrial past. It would be 19–22 metres (62–72 ft) if warming peaks at 5 °C (9.0 °F). The expected increase in flood hazard potential is often exceedingly large even for modest sea-level rise scenarios, ranging from 10 to 1000 for rises of 0.5 m or less.

== Global goals ==
International attention to address the threats of coasts has been captured in Sustainable Development Goal 14 "Life Below Water" which sets goals for international policy focused on preserving marine coastal ecosystems and supporting more sustainable economic practices for coastal communities. Likewise, the United Nations has declared 2021–2030 the UN Decade on Ecosystem Restoration, but restoration of coastal ecosystems has received insufficient attention.

== See also ==
- Bank (geography)
- Beach cleaning
- Coastal and Estuarine Research Federation
- European Atlas of the Seas
- Intertidal zone
- Land reclamation
- List of countries by length of coastline
- List of U.S. states by coastline
- Offshore or Intertidal zone
- Ballantine Scale
- Coastal path
- Shorezone
