= Limber =

Limber may refer to:

- Limber (artillery), a cart used for supporting an artillery piece in transit
- Limber (dessert), a Puerto Rican frozen ice pop
- Limber hole, a type of drain hole in ships
- Limber pine, a species of tree found in the United States and Canada
- Limber Trail, Shenandoah National Park, United States

== Persons with the given name ==
- Limber Pérez (born 1976), Honduran football player
