= Floor timber =

Support below the flooring plank

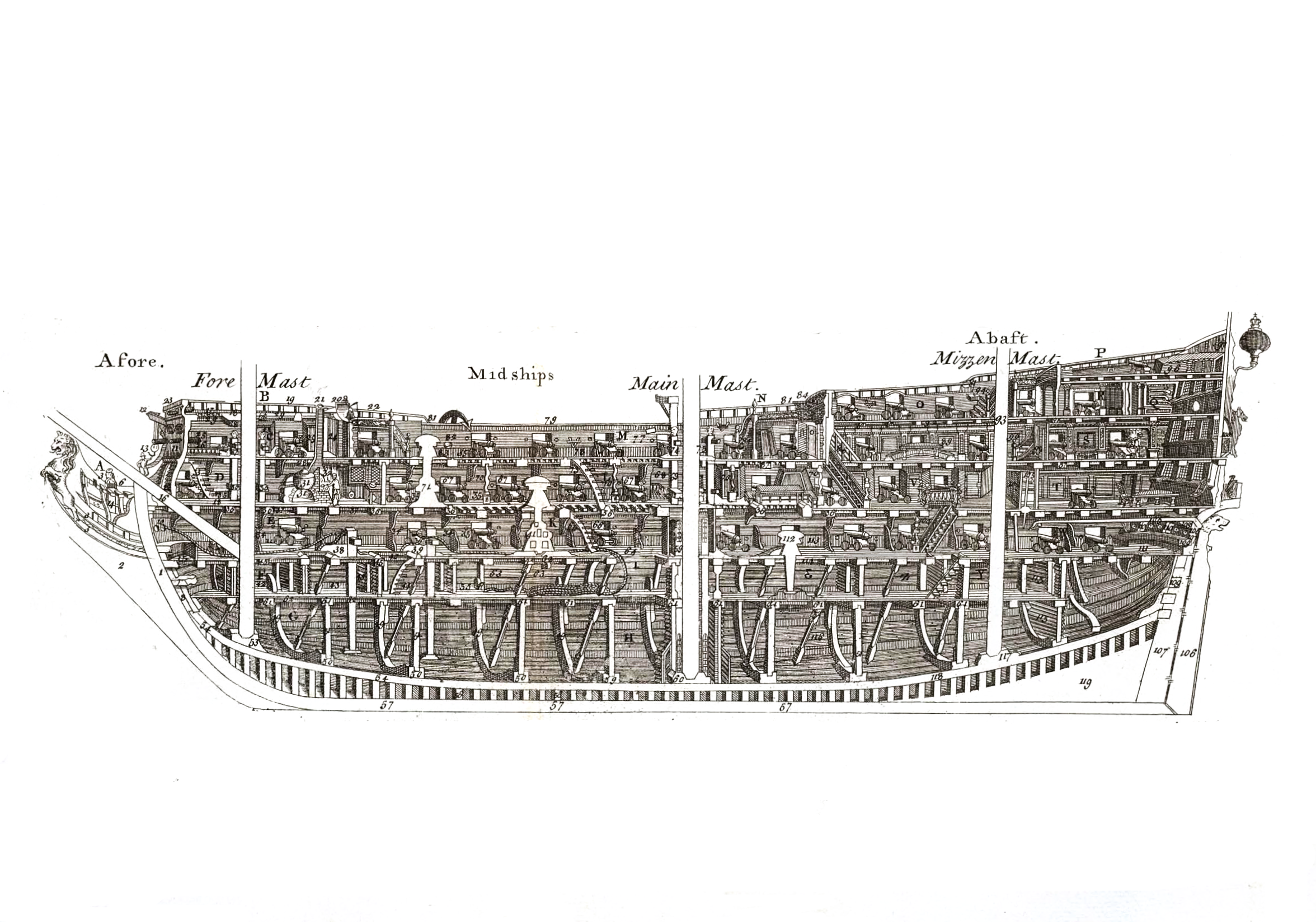
Floor timbers supporting the lower deck

In wooden ships, floor timber is the support below the flooring plank. As modern ships are not made of timber, the same concept is known by several names; bulkhead, transversal frame or side girder. This steel framing is usually made with lightening holes. If floor timbers lay tight between the floor and the hull, bulkhead compartments are created.

In modern ships, the inside space at the bottom produced by transversal frames are called bilges in plural, singular for the external side or bilge.

== History ==
Roman era boats (2nd century AD) found in the Lower Rhine, current Netherlands, employed this structural style. In Roman corbita merchant ships (1st century AD), bulkheads were formed between the floor and hull due to transversal floor timbers.

English appears to lack a specific word for this sort of wooden transversal frames, however in several Romance languages, the specific word "varangue" and "varenga" for floor timber appears to be derived from old Norman around 1379.

The style was also employed in ships during the Age of Sail.
