= Discordant coastline =

Type of coastline

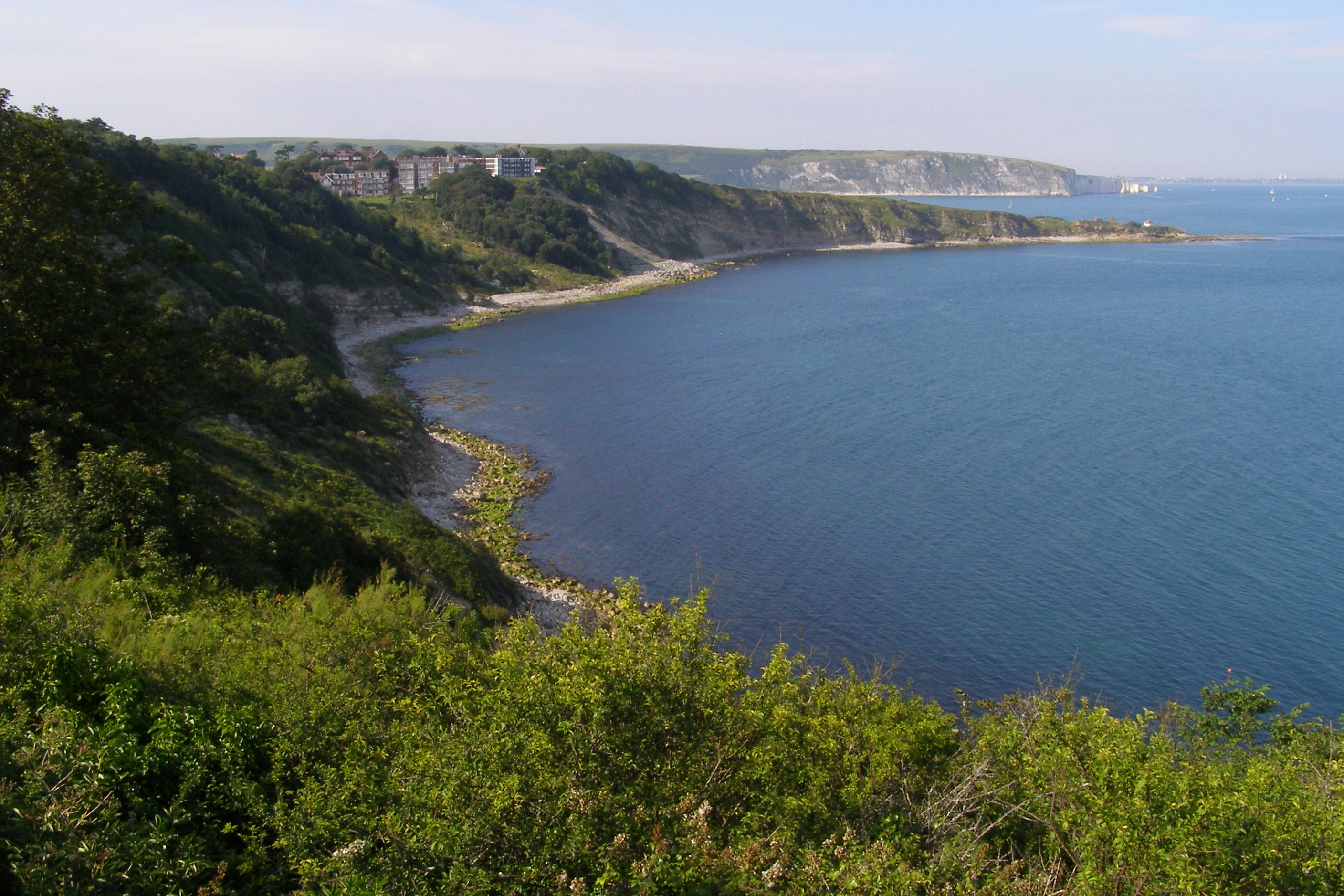
Durlston Head (limestone) to Handfast Point (chalk), with Peveril Point (limestone) dividing Durlston Bay from Swanage Bay

A discordant coastline occurs where bands of different rock types run perpendicular to the coast.

The differing resistance to erosion leads to the formation of headlands and bays. A hard rock type such as granite is resistant to erosion and creates a promontory whilst a softer rock type such as the clays of Bagshot Beds is easily eroded creating a bay.

Part of the Dorset coastline running north from the Portland limestone of Durlston Head is a clear example of a discordant coastline. The Portland limestone is resistant to erosion; then to the north there is a bay at Swanage where the rock type is a softer greensand. North of Swanage, the chalk outcrop creates the headland which includes Old Harry Rocks.

The converse of a discordant coastline is a concordant coastline.

== Examples ==
- The coastline around Durlston Bay (50°36′24″N 1°57′54″W) is an example of a discordant coastline.

== See also ==
- Concordant coastline
