= Concordant coastline =

Type of coastline created by the folding of differing rock layers parallel to the coast

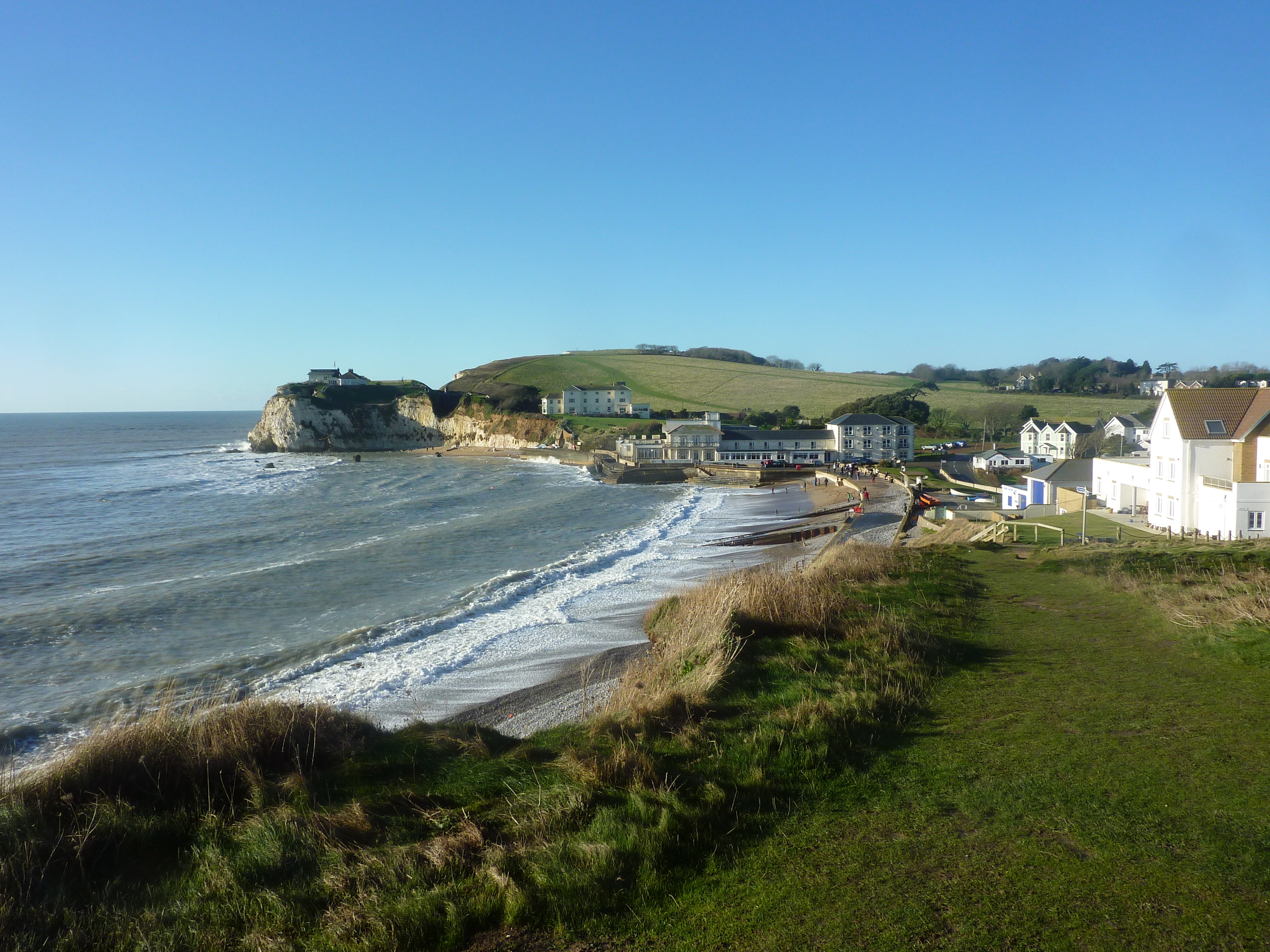
Freshwater Bay, Isle of Wight is an example of an area of concordant coastline - the town of Freshwater is situated on a cove which formed in the hard chalk landscape of the surrounding area.

In coastal geography, a concordant, longitudinal, or Pacific type coastline occurs where beds, or layers, of differing rock types are folded into ridges that run parallel to the coast. The outer hard rock (for example, granite) provides a protective barrier to erosion of the softer rocks (for example, clays) further inland. Sometimes the outer hard rock is punctured, allowing the sea to erode the softer rocks behind. This creates a cove, a circular area of water with a relatively narrow entrance from the sea.

Lulworth Cove in Dorset is situated on a concordant coastline. The outer hard rock is Portland limestone. The sea has broken through this barrier and easily eroded the clays behind it. A chalk cliff face at the back of the cove slows further erosion. Erosion is just starting to the west, where the sea has again broken through the Portland limestone barrier at Stair Hole.

The concordant coast may take one of two landform types. The Dalmatian type, named from Dalmatia on the Adriatic Sea, features long offshore islands and coastal inlets that are parallel to the coastline. The Adriatic Sea itself is a concordant landform, consisting of a body of water between parallel ranges. These Dalmatian types normally occur in high energy environments from where there is eustatic or isostatic change creating a submerging coastline. The second landform is the Haff type as in the Haffs, or lagoons, of the southern shore of the Baltic Sea, which are enclosed by long spits of sand parallel to the low coast.

The converse of concordant coastline is a discordant coastline.

== See also ==
- Coast
