= Graded shoreline =

A graded shoreline is a stage in the cycle of coastal development characterised by a flat and straight coastline. It is formed under the influence of wind and water from the original bays, islands, peninsulas and promontories. Sand and gravel is carried away and dumped at other locations depending on the direction and strength of sea currents. Typical of graded shorelines are the formation of dunes, wide sandy beaches and sometimes a lagoon or a spit. Where two graded shorelines meet, a headland may form with a sandy reef in the sea beyond it. Parallel to the graded shoreline sandbanks may form as a result of sediments transported away from the shore.

== Examples ==
- Long stretches of the southern Baltic Sea coast in the German state of Mecklenburg-Vorpommern, in Poland, Russia, Lithuania and Latvia.
- The North Sea coast from Belgium, along the outer edge of the Wadden Sea islands in the Netherlands and Germany, to the west coast and northeast coast of Jutland in Denmark.
- On the headland of Jutland near Skagen the two graded shorelines for the constantly changing promontory of Grenen.
- On the island of Anholt in the Kattegat, two graded shorelines meet at the eastern bill of Totten. This headland also extends far under the surface of the sea as a reef.
- The peninsula of Hel in Poland consists of sediments carried eastwards from the Pomeranian coast, that are deposited in front of the Bay of Danzig.

== Sources ==
- German Wikipedia
- Whittow, John (1984). Dictionary of Physical Geography. London: Penguin, 1984. ISBN 0-14-051094-X.
