= Limber hole =

Drain hole on a boat

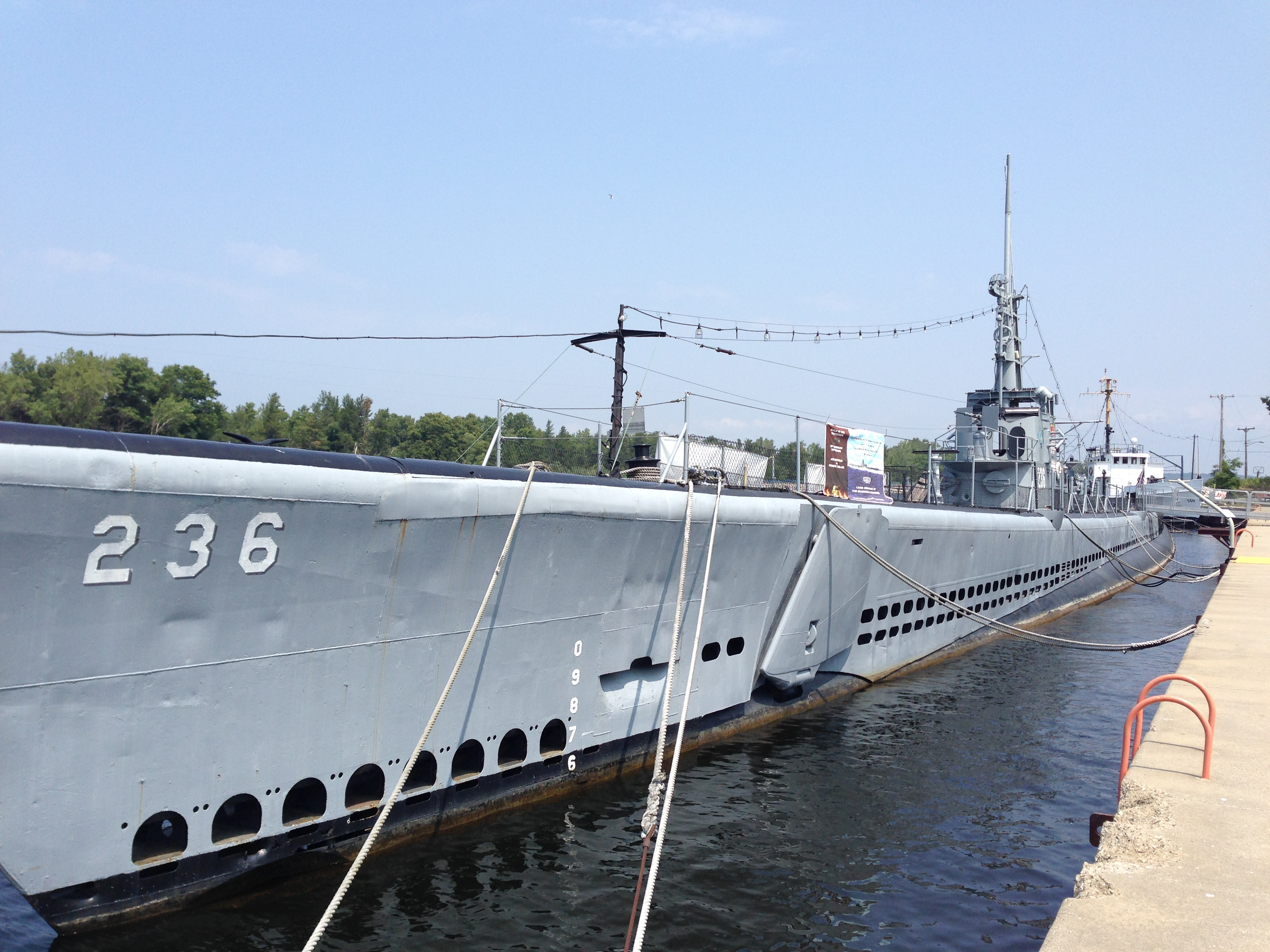
Limber holes on the WWII-vintage USS Silversides (SS-236)

A limber hole is a drain hole through a frame or other structural member of a boat designed to prevent water from accumulating against one side of the frame, and allowing it to drain toward the bilge.

Limber holes are common in the bilges of wooden boats. The term may be extended to cover drain holes in floors. Limber holes are created in between bulkheads so that one compartment does not fill with water. The limber holes allow water to drain into the lowest part of the bilge so that it can be pumped out by a single bilge pump (or more usually, one electric and one manual pump).

The term is also commonly applied to the holes in mid-20th century submarine upperworks, which allow drainage from the superstructure.
