= Limber (dessert) =

Puerto Rican ice pop

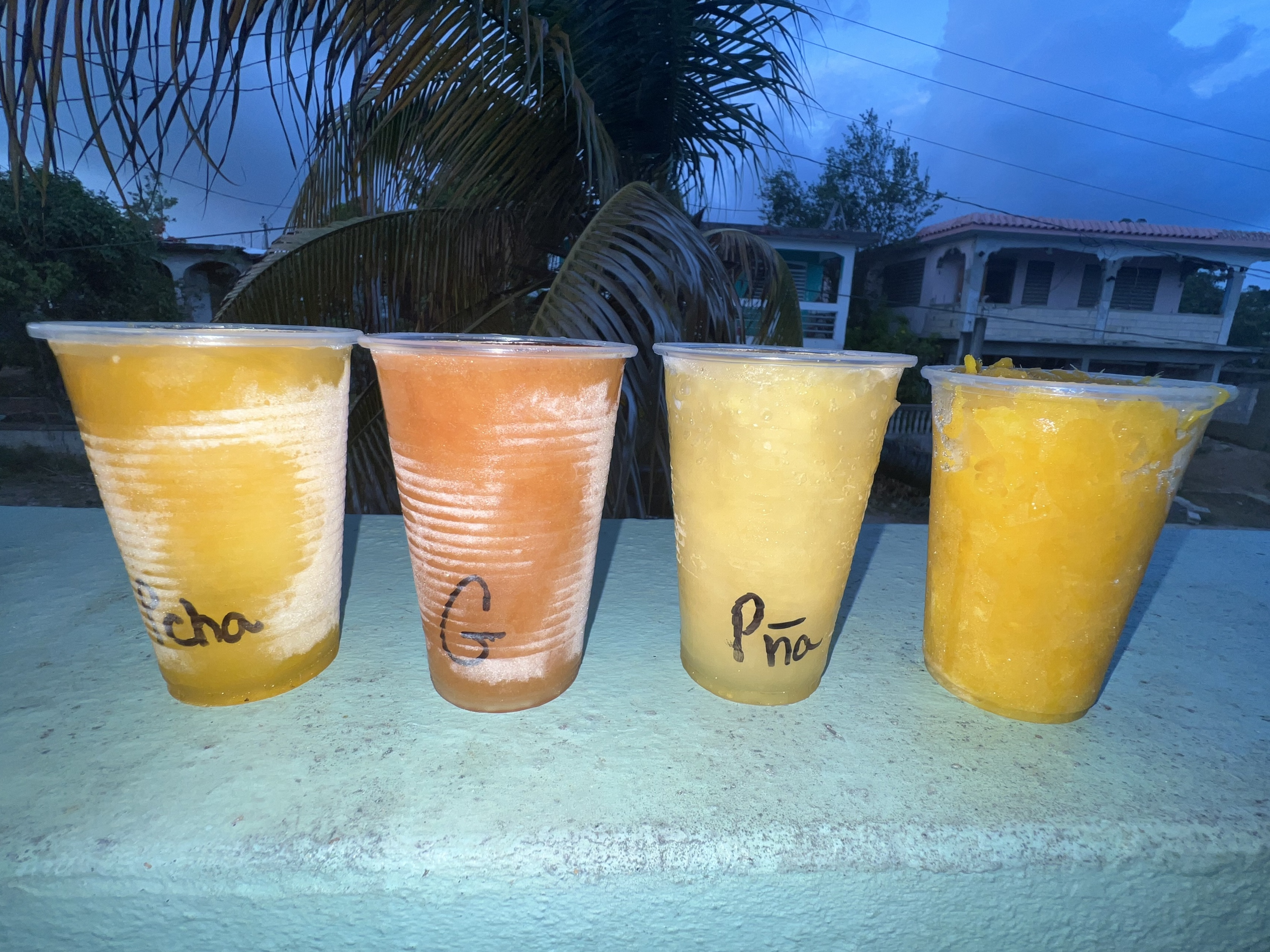
Left to right: passionfruit, guava, pineapple, and mango limbers in Esperanza, Puerto Rico

A limber is a frozen ice pop originating in Puerto Rico. It is made in different flavors.

Limber is derived from the Spanish pronunciation of pilot Charles Lindbergh's last name. According to local lore, Lindbergh arrived in Puerto Rico in 1928 and was greeted with a frozen juice that later was referred to as limbers.

Limbers are frozen in cups without a stick. They often include a frozen sweet, like cream, and fruit juice. Syrups can also be used. Traditional flavors include parcha (passionfruit), tamarind, pineapple, and coconut. Limbers are eaten by squeezing the bottom of the cup to push the pop out. They can also be prepared in bags.

Outside of Puerto Rico, limbers are served during the summer in areas with a significant Puerto Rican diaspora population, including New York, Florida and Massachusetts.

== Bibliography ==
- Cotto, Ingrid (June 6, 2020). "Una dulce tradición puertorriqueña: Recetas de limber para refrescar tu verano". Orlando Sentinel (in Spanish).
- Peartree, Millie. "Limber de Coco Recipe". New York Times.
