= Bilge pump =

Pump that drains water from a vessel

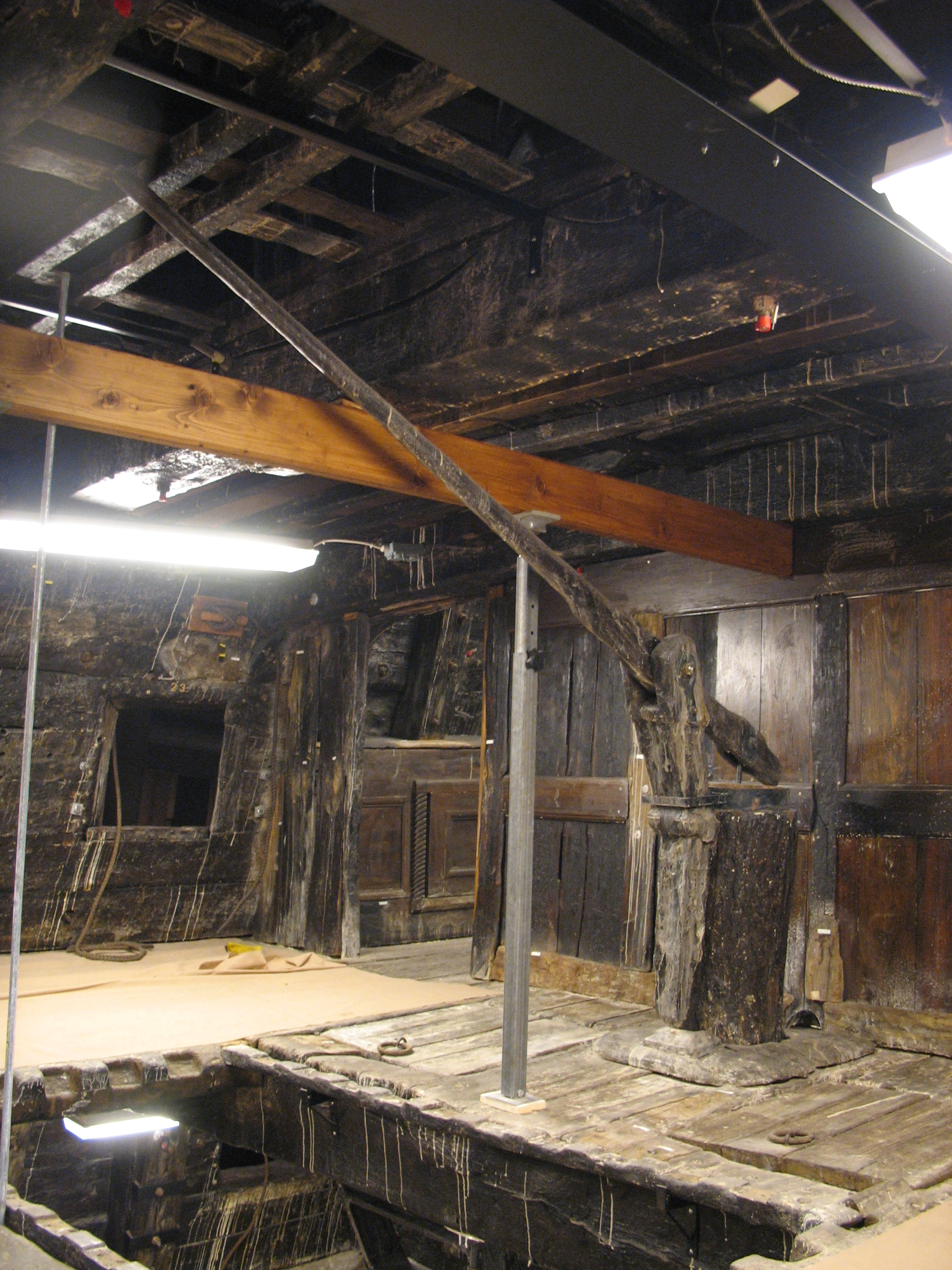
The still-intact aft bilge pump of the Swedish 17th century warship Vasa as seen from the upper gun deck.

A bilge pump is a water pump used to remove bilge water. Since fuel can be present in the bilge, electric bilge pumps are designed to not cause sparks. Electric bilge pumps are often fitted with float switches which turn on the pump when the bilge fills to a set level. Since bilge pumps can fail, use of a backup pump is often advised. The primary pump is normally located at the lowest point of the bilge, while the secondary pump would be located somewhat higher. This ensures that the secondary pump activates only when the primary pump is overwhelmed or fails, and keeps the secondary pump free of the debris in the bilge that tends to clog the primary pump.

Ancient bilge force pumps had a number of common uses. Depending on where the pump was located in the hull of the ship, it could be used to suck in sea water into a live fish tank to preserve fish until the ship was docked and the fish ready to be sold. Another use of the force pump was to combat fires. Water would again be sucked in through the bottom of the hull, and then pumped onto the blaze. Yet another suggested use for a force pump was to dispel water from a ship. The pump would be placed near the bottom of the hull so as to suck water out of the ship. Force pumps were used on land as well. They could be used to bring water up from a well or to fill high placed tanks so that water could be pressure pumped from these tanks. These tanks were for household use and/or small-scale irrigation. The force pump was portable and could therefore, as on ships, be used to fight fire.

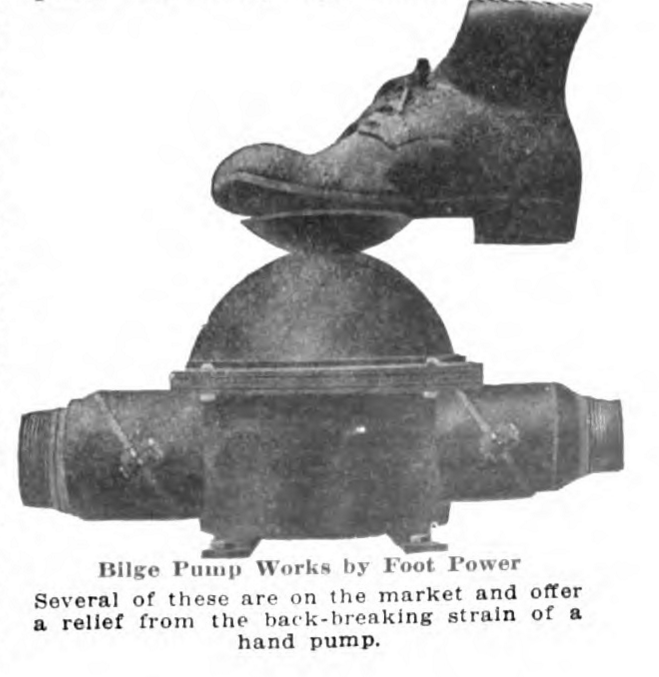

Force pumps could be made of either wood or bronze. Based on ancient texts, it seems that bronze was the preferred material since it lasted longer and was more easily transported. Wood was easier to build, put together, and repair but was not as durable as bronze. Because these were high-value objects, few are found in shipwrecks; they were often recovered after the ship sank. Force pumps were fairly simple in their construction consisting of a cylinder, a piston, and a few valves. Water would fill the cylinder after which the piston would descend into the cylinder, causing the water to move to a higher placed pipe. The valve would close, locking the water into the higher pipe, and then propelling it in a jet stream.

== Archimedes' screw ==
The Archimedes' screw can raise water efficiently.

The Greek writer Athenaeus of Naucratis described how King Hieron II commissioned Archimedes to design a huge ship, Syracusia, which could be used for luxury travel, carrying supplies, and as a naval warship. Syracusia is said to have been the largest ship built in classical antiquity. According to Athenaeus, she was capable of carrying 600 people and included garden decorations, a gymnasium and a temple dedicated to the goddess Aphrodite among her facilities. Since a ship of this size would leak a considerable amount of water through the hull, the Archimedes' screw was purportedly developed in order to remove the bilge water. Archimedes' machine was a device with a revolving screw-shaped blade inside a cylinder. It was turned by hand, and could also be used to transfer water from a low-lying body of water into irrigation canals. The Archimedes' screw is still in use today for pumping liquids and granulated solids such as coal and grain. The Archimedes' screw described in Roman times by Vitruvius may have been an improvement on a screw pump that was used to irrigate the Hanging Gardens of Babylon, but this is disputed due to a lack of actual evidence.
