= Beach cusps =

Shoreline formations made up of various grades of sediment in an arc pattern

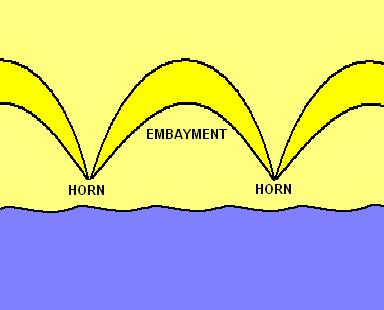
A beach cusp

Beach cusps are shoreline formations made up of various grades of sediment in an arc pattern. The horns are made up of coarser material and the embayment contains finer sediment.

They can be found all over the world and are most noticeable on shorelines with coarser sediment such as pebble beaches. However, they can occur with sediment of any size. They nearly always occur in a regular pattern with cusps of equal size and spacing appearing along stretches of the shoreline. These cusps are most often a few metres long. However, they may reach 60 m (200 ft) across. Although the origin of beach cusps has yet to be proven, once cusps have been created they are a self-sustaining formation. This is because when an oncoming wave hits the horn of a beach cusp, it is split and forced into two directions. The crashing of the wave into the cusps slows its velocity, causing coarser sediment to fall out of suspension and be deposited on the horns. The waves then flow along the embayments (picking up finer sediment) and run into one another in the middle. After this collision these waves attempt to flow back out to sea where they are met by incoming waves. Therefore, once the cusp is established, coarser sediment is constantly being deposited on the horn and finer sediment is being eroded away from the embayments. This process causes the horns and embayments to at least maintain their size, if not grow larger.

== Formation ==
There are a number of theories as to why beach cusps are formed but currently, there are only two explanations with any real credibility.

=== Standing edge wave theory ===
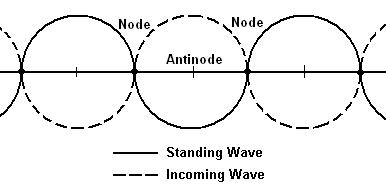
Standing Edge Wave Theory

The standing edge wave theory is based on an interaction, near the shoreline, between the waves that are approaching the shore and waves that have been set up perpendicular to the shoreline called 'edge waves'. The regular arrival of incoming waves in the near shore waters causes the development of waves perpendicular to the direction of the incoming waves; these are termed 'edge waves'. These edge waves become trapped near the shoreline and when two of them come together from opposite directions, a standing edge wave is formed. The movement patterns of these waves are fixed and so can be defined as two regions of interest, the nodal and antinodal points.

The antinodal point is where all the movement takes place as the water rises and falls, creating a series of peaks and troughs. Between these antinodal points are the nodal points where no vertical movement takes place. An incoming wave has an almost uniform height but when it collides with a standing edge wave, this is changed. If it collides with a peak, then the wave height is increased and if it collides with a trough, then its height is decreased. In the adjacent diagram, the two waves cancel each other out, creating a flat surface. However, this is a highly simplified version of events. The incoming wave has the same wave period as the edge wave, so the incoming wave changes from a peak to a trough over the same period as it takes the standing wave to change so they keep the same pattern. These are known as synchronous waves and are very uncommon.

The more common standing edge waves are subharmonic and these can have a wave period twice that of the incoming wave. This produces a far more complex system of waves as by the time the incoming wave has completed one cycle from peak to trough, the standing edge waves have done two. So what started as the peak of a standing edge wave within the trough of the incoming wave will change to a trough before the incoming wave has changed so what was initially being given a boost in height now experiences a drop. Essentially what this means is that there are a regularly spaced series of peaks and troughs along the length on the incoming wave that are caused by its interaction with the standing edge waves and it is these that caused the development of beach cusps.

In areas where the wave height has been increased, the wave now has more power and so can erode more and in areas where the wave height has been decreased, the wave now has less power and so will not erode as much. This is what forms the cusps as the areas with high erosion become the embayments of the cusp and the areas with low erosion become the horns.

The problem with the standing edge wave theory is that it would only account for the initial formation of the cusp and not their continued growth afterwards because as the cusp increases in size the amplitude of the edge wave decreases to the point where it is no longer a factor.

=== Self-organization ===
This theory was initially dismissed due to complications with it but by using more advanced computer simulations, it has been developed to the point where it now provides a reasonable alternative to the standing edge wave theory. The theory has two main points that seek to explain the formation of regularly spaced beach cusps.

The first is that positive feedback between the morphology of the beach and the flow of the water creates relief patterns. On a flat beach, surface areas will develop with a slightly lower relief than their surroundings. Areas with lower relief attract and accelerate water particles, which means they have more energy and the area is eroded further. Through positive feedback, the area becomes more and more eroded, and this creates the embayment. The development of these areas of lower relief causes mean beach level to be lowered and so areas that were initially on the level are now below the average and as such, are now areas of higher relief. Areas of higher relief slow the water down and sediment is deposited on top of them, which increases their impact. This creates the horns.

The uniform spacing of cusps is caused by the communication of surface gradients along the beach by the smoothing of the beach surface as the beach tries to rearrange itself to reduce variations in the plane.

The second main point about the regular spacing of cusps is that negative feedback will decrease the amount of net erosion and deposition within a well-formed cusp. As the wave strikes the beach, it will first come into contact with the cusp horns, which will slow the water down. This causes it to lose energy and some of the heavier sediment that it is carrying will be deposited. The loss of this sediment, however, gives the water extra energy, and it uses this to remove sediment from the embayment on the backwash.

The problem with this theory is that this method of cusp formation would take time and if you were observing their formation, then you would see a number of random cusps form along the beach, which then slowly spread along the shore as they even out in size, with small cusps joining and larger cusps being separated in two. But in the field, cusps form a regular pattern almost instantly and they all appear at the same time.

== Field studies ==
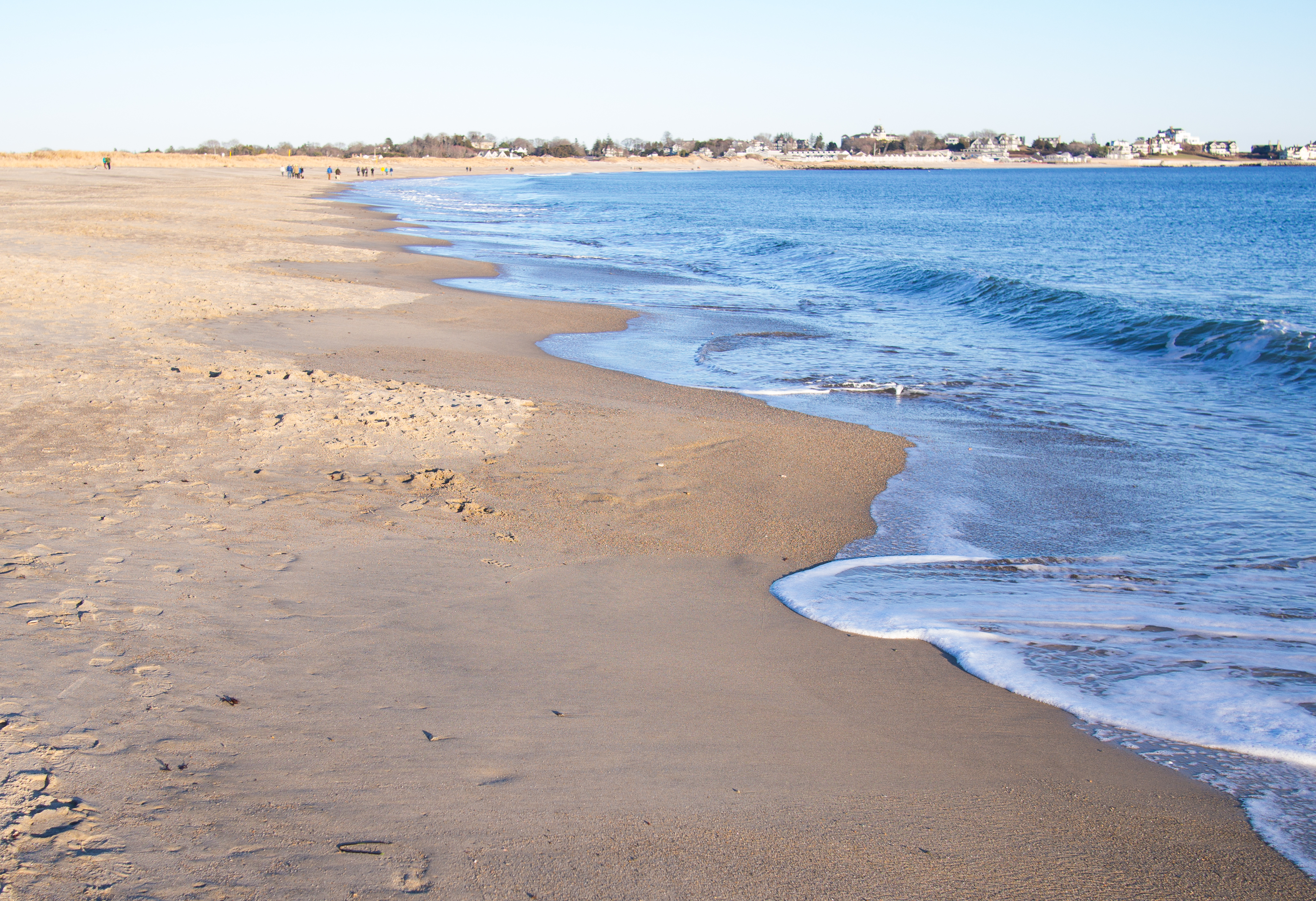
Beach cusps in Westerly, Rhode Island

In recent years, there has been considerable debate about whether beach cusp formation is associated with the presence of standing edge waves (standing edge wave theory), results from self-organizing feedback between changing topography and swash motion (self-organization theory) or is attributable to a number of other less popular mechanisms.

The National Centre of Scientific Research in France, collected a large amount of data from laboratory experiments and field studies, published over the last 50 years to test the predictions of the two main cusp forming hypotheses. These analyses, using more data than previous attempts, confirm that there is a possible link between cusp development and both edge waves and swash-sediment feedback, and that it is not possible to produce conclusive support for one theory above the other with the simple measurements that have been made previously.

The Naval Research Laboratory, the corporate research laboratory for the United States Navy and Marine Corps carried out nearly nine years of video imagery from Duck, North Carolina to determine the timing of cusp formation (to within half a day) and the distances separating consecutive cusp horns (to within half a metre). Supplementary data provided by nearshore instrumentation and surveying vehicles was used to document the environmental conditions during cusp development.

These extensive observations conclusively demonstrate that cusps at this location develop, following storms during the transition from high energy to low energy wave conditions as the wave angle approaches normal incidence. A peculiar suggestion of hysteresis within the cusp spacing time series was observed and may suggest that existing theories of cusp formation need to be reformulated.

== See also ==
- Cuspate foreland
