= Bilge pollution =

Contaminated water originating from a ship's bilge

Bilge pollution is a type of water pollution that occurs when the bilge water in a ship's hull is discharged into the ocean. In research published in 2019, it was estimated that up to 3000 cases of bilge dumping happen in Europe every year. According to another estimate, approximately 52.8 million gallons of pollutants are discharged into the ocean annually.

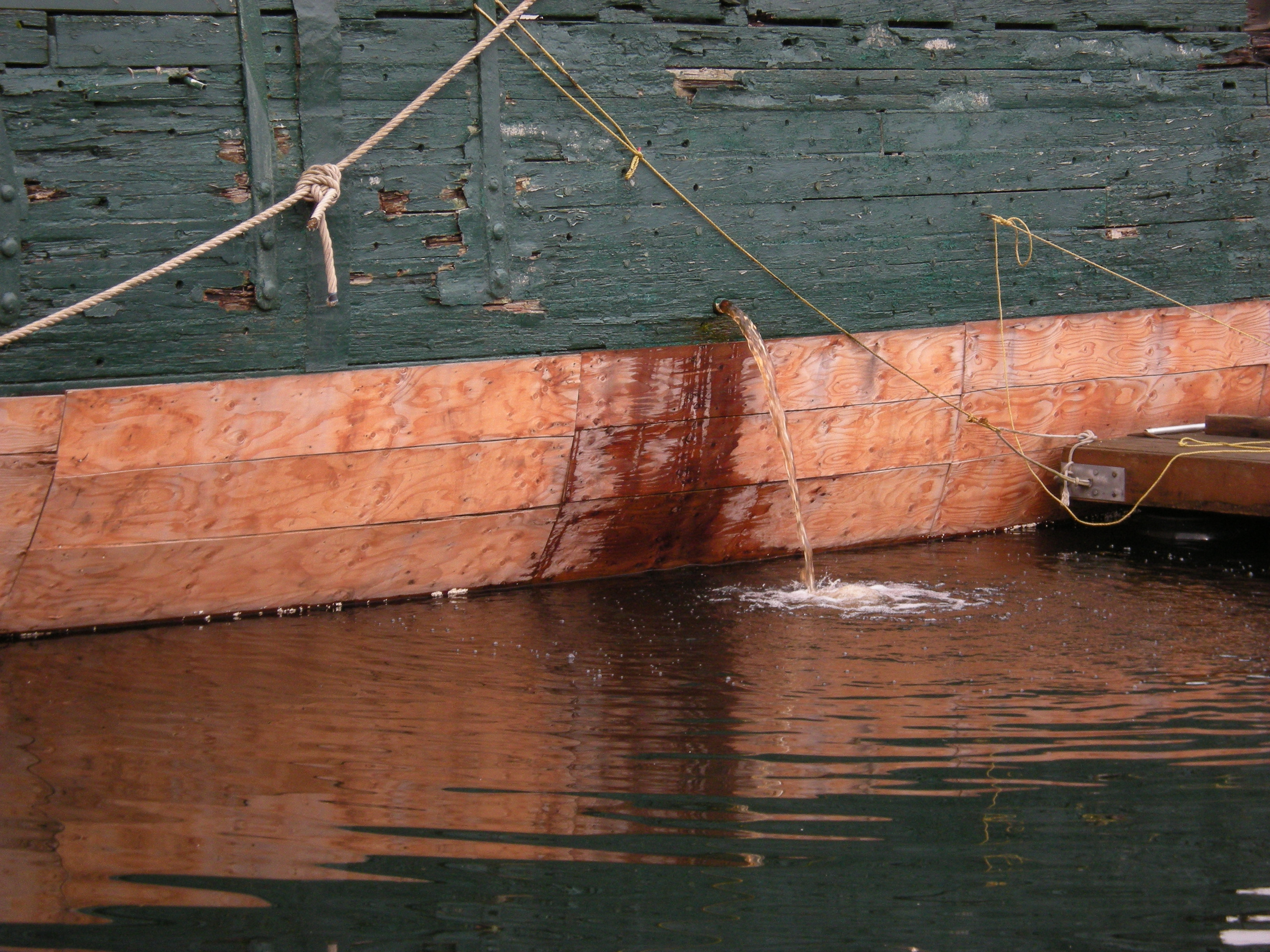
Pumping bilge water out of the 111-year-old schooner Wawona.

Treatment of bilge water, in which all contaminants are removed, is the preferred method of dealing with bilge water pollution. Due to increased operational costs, companies mostly dump waste directly into the ocean without properly processing it. Due to the presence of carcinogenic chemicals, bilge water waste is considered a threat to marine life and human health.

== Bilge water standards ==
Bilge pollution can be prevented if bilge water, which is a normal accumulation of polluted water in the bilge of a marine vessel, is treated before it is discharged from said vessel.

Bilge water treatment in the United States is largely regulated by the Clean Water Act (CWA), which is jointly enforced by the United States Environmental Protection Agency (EPA) and the United States Coast Guard. Section 301(a) of the CWA outlaws the discharge of any pollutant from a marine vessel, unless the discharge is in compliance with regulations provided in other sections of the CWA. Bilge pollution is defined as a type of ‘‘discharge incidental to the normal operation of a vessel" in § 1322 of the CWA. The EPA sets standards for the amount of different pollutants that bilge water can contain before being discharged into large bodies of water. If the bilge water is not in compliance with these standards at the time of the bilge water being released, then individuals and/or companies involved in the pollution may face fines.

International bilge water standards have been in place since the MARPOL 73/78 convention, sponsored by the International Maritime Organization. The current standards were set in 1996 by Regulation 16 of MARPOL Annex I, which requires vessels weighing more than 400 tons to be fitted with an oily water separator, and establishes that bilge water released into international waters must have an oil content of less than 15 parts per million (ppm).

== Bilge pollution incidents ==
The most common reason that vessels engage in bilge pollution is to avoid buying bilge treatment equipment or paying to dispose of bilge water in designated facilities, which can become very expensive. Bilge pollution incidents occur frequently, which causes oil pollution in bodies of water to accumulate over time, causing harm to marine ecosystems. However, perpetrators of bilge pollution, which can include maintaining incomplete or forged records relating to bilge discharge, can lead to hefty fines. There have been countless accounts of bilge pollution around Indonesia, which can negatively affect the fishing economy there. In 2022, the company New Trade Ship Management S.A. and its chief engineer Dennis Plasabas pleaded guilty to maintaining false and incomplete records of bilge discharge from the carrier vessel Longshore. In 2023, Zeaborn Ship Management out of Singapore was charged with "dump[ing] over 7,500 gallons of oily bilge water from the Star Maia into the ocean without first processing the oily bilge water through required pollution prevention equipment" and fined $2 million. In 2024, a company based in Mexico, Gremex Shipping, was fined $1.75 million for discharging untreated bilge water into the ocean and falsifying records regarding these actions. However, many more bilge pollution incidents occur than are detected or punished, furthering ocean pollution and harm to marine ecosystems.
