= Bilge =

Part of a ship or boat's hull

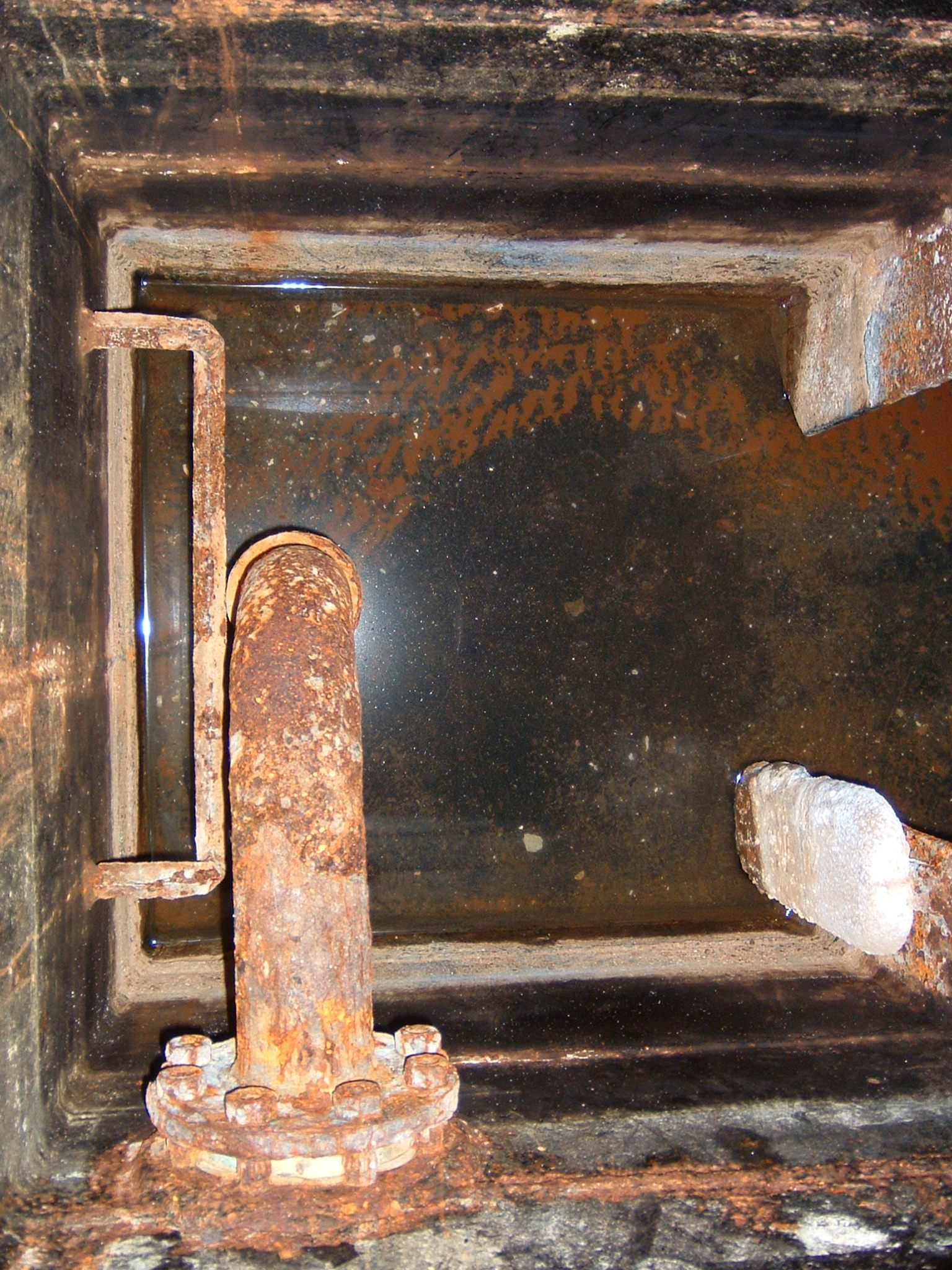
Bilge compartment in a steel hulled ship (looking down)

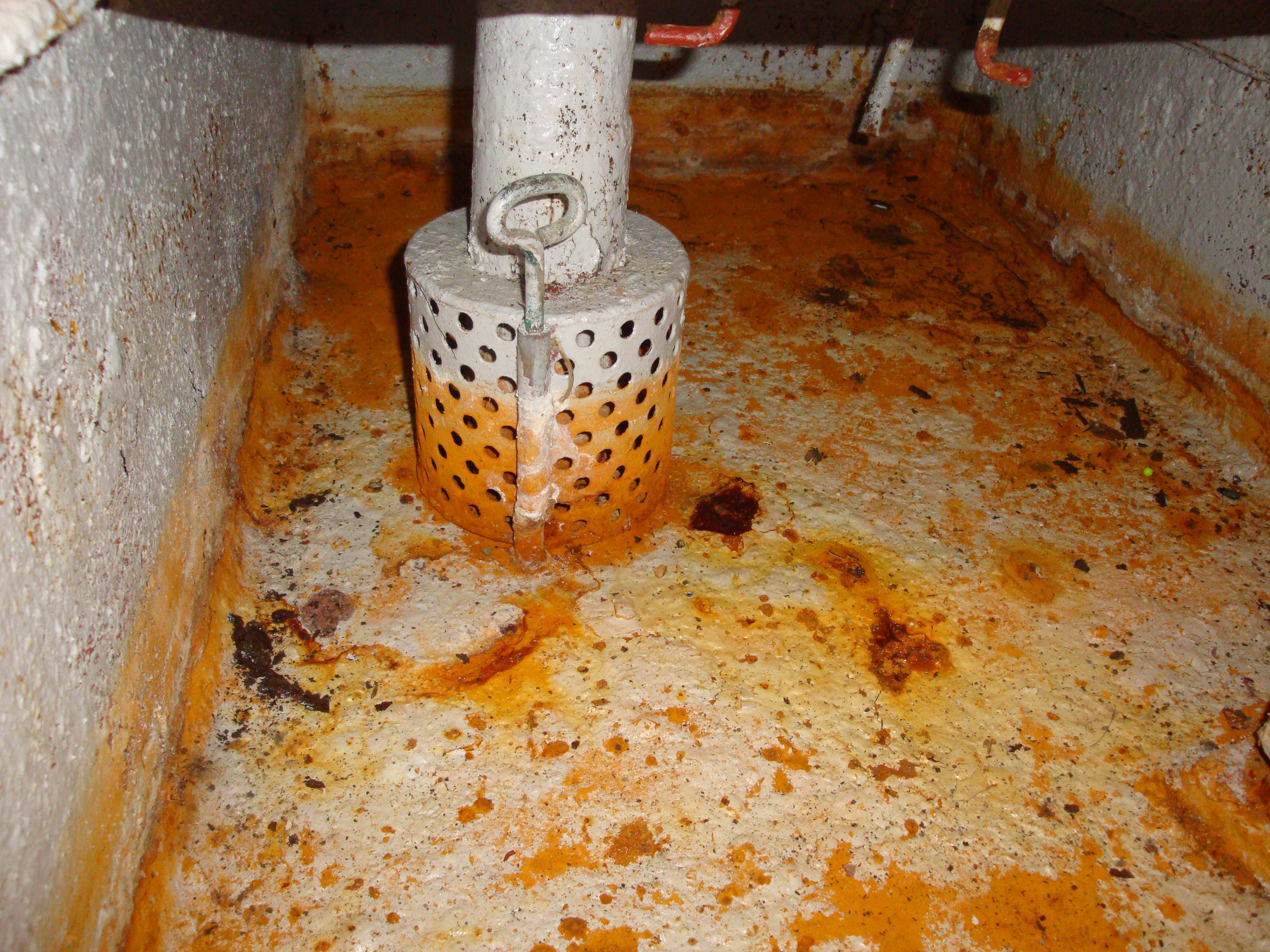
Bilge compartment and pump

The bilge (pronounced as /bɪldʒ/) of a ship or boat is the part of the hull that would rest on the ground if the vessel were unsupported by water. The "turn of the bilge" is the transition from the bottom of a hull to the sides of a hull.

Internally, the bilges (usually used in the plural in this context) is the lowest compartment on a ship or seaplane, on either side of the keel and (in a traditional wooden vessel) between the floors. (Note: The floor of a traditionally-built wooden ship or boat is the part of the transverse frame of the hull that attaches to the keel and extends outwards from the keel to join the frames that carry on up to the sides of the hull.)

The first known use of the word is from 1513.

== Bilge water ==
The word is sometimes also used to describe the water that collects in this area. Water that does not drain off the side of the deck or through a hole in the hull, which it would typically do via a scupper, instead drains down into the ship into the bilge. This water may be from rough seas, rain, leaks in the hull or stuffing box, or other interior spillage. The collected water must be pumped out to prevent the bilge from becoming too full and threatening to sink the ship.

Bilge water can be found aboard almost every vessel. Depending on the ship's design and function, bilge water may contain water, oil, urine, detergents, solvents, chemicals, pitch, particles, and other materials.

By housing water in a compartment, the bilge keeps these liquids below decks, making it safer for the crew to operate the vessel and for people to move around in heavy weather.

== Regulations ==
Discharge of bilge liquids is regulated for commercial vessels under Marpol Annex I as it can lead to bilge pollution.

Princess Cruises' Caribbean Princess was fined $40 million USD for dumping bilge into the ocean in 2016. Bilge water can be offloaded at a port, or treated to remove pollutants. Even treated bilge water is harmful to the environment, all the way up the food chain. The European Maritime Safety Agency tracks bilge dumping by satellite. There are an estimated 3000 cases of illegal bilge dumping per year in Europe.

== Bilge maintenance ==
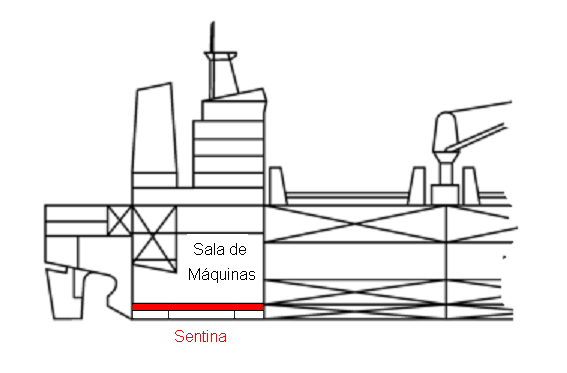
Sentina is Italian and Spanish for bilge

Methods of removing water from bilges have included buckets and pumps. Modern vessels usually use electric bilge pumps controlled by automated bilge switches. Bilge coatings are applied to protect the bilge surfaces. The water that collects is often noxious, and "bilge water" or just "bilge" has thus become a derogatory colloquial term used to refer to something bad, fouled, or otherwise offensive.

Bilges may contain partitions to damp the rush of water from side to side and fore and aft to avoid destabilizing the ship due to the free surface effect. Partitions may contain limber holes to allow water to flow at a controlled rate into lower compartments.

Cleaning the bilge and bilge water is also possible using "passive" methods such as bioremediation, which uses bacteria or archaea to break down the hydrocarbons in the bilge water into harmless byproducts. Of the two general schools of thought on bioremediation, the one that uses beneficial microbes local to the bilge is regarded as being more "green" because it does not introduce foreign bacteria to the waters that the vessel sits in or travels through. But archaea that are non-indigenous also can be used and discharged, since the archaea will die off anyway, leaving only local indigenous microbes remaining.

== Bilge alarm ==
Large commercial vessels need bilge alarms to notify the crew how much and where the bilge water is rising. These bilge alarms are electric devices that are also designed to detect leakages in the ship early before major damage is done to the vessel. Oil content meters are sometimes referred to as bilge alarms.

== "Bilge rat" ==
The term "bilge rat" typically refers to members of a ship's crew who work in the bowels of the vessel, where rats would sometimes breed. The term was sometimes used in the Royal Navy to describe stokers who shovelled coal into the boilers of steam-powered warships. It is utilized as an insult, and often employed as such by writers of pirate fiction.

== In popular culture ==
The term bilgewater is commonly used to mean nonsense.

== See also ==
- Basement
- Bilge pollution
- Water ballast
