= Magic pipe =

Trick in a ship's waste-handling equipment to circumvent pollution regulations

A magic pipe is a surreptitious change to a ship's oily water separator (OWS), or other waste-handing equipment, which allows waste liquids to be discharged in contravention of maritime pollution regulations. Such equipment alterations may allow hundreds of thousands of gallons of contaminated water to be discharged untreated, causing extensive pollution of marine waters.

== Manipulation techniques ==
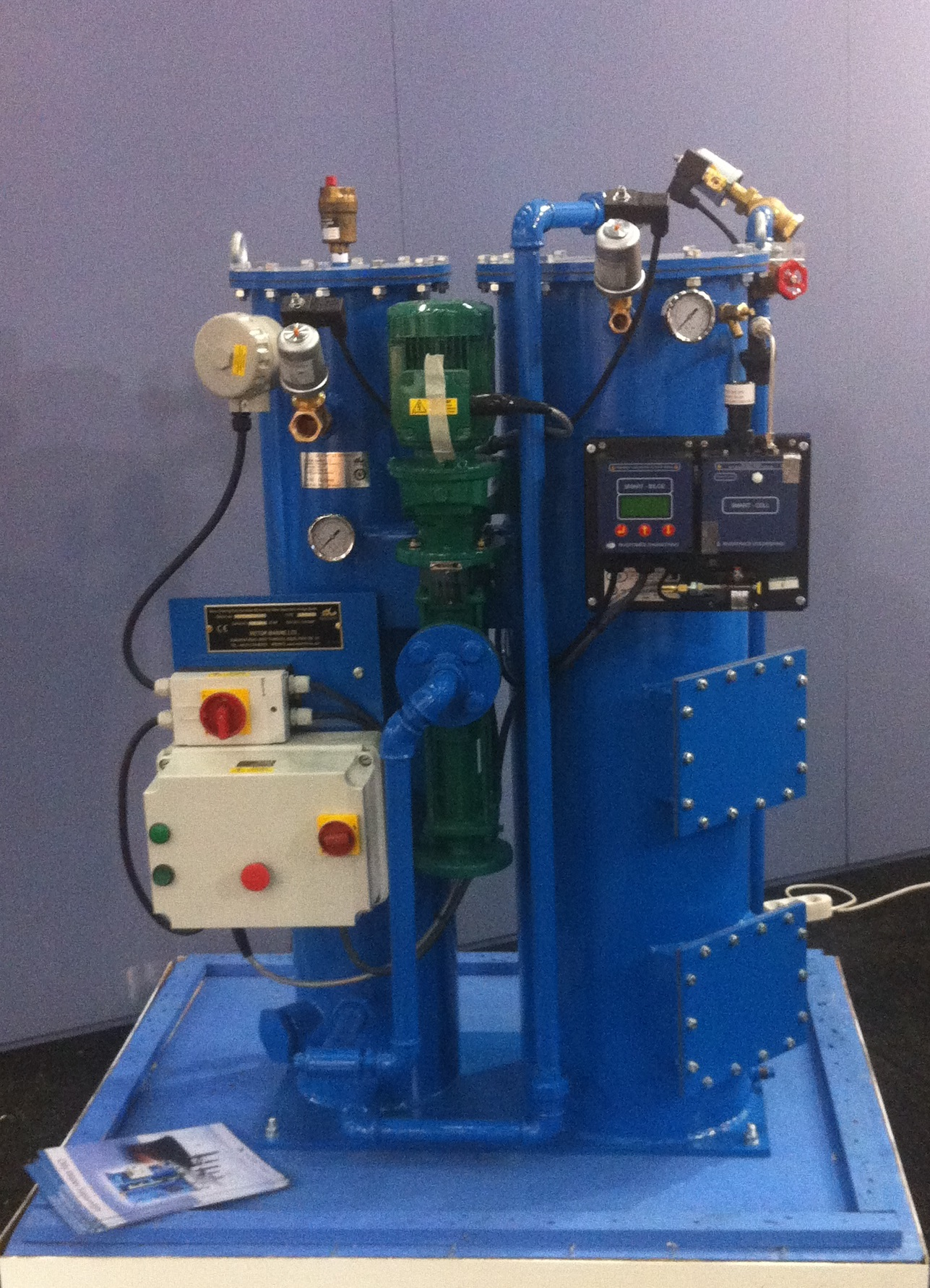
A marine oily water separator

The pipe may be improvised, aboard ship, from available hoses and pumps, to discharge untreated waste water directly into the sea. As ships are required to keep records of waste and its treatment, magic pipe cases often involve falsification of these records. The pipe is called "magic" because it bypasses the ship's oily water separator and goes directly overboard. Hence, it can make untreated bilge water "magically disappear".

Often the pipe can be easily disconnected and stored away into a different location aboard the ship so state and regulatory officers can not detect its usage. The use of magic pipes continues to this day, as well as efforts to improve bilge water treatment to make the use of magic pipes unnecessary.

== Legal ramifications ==
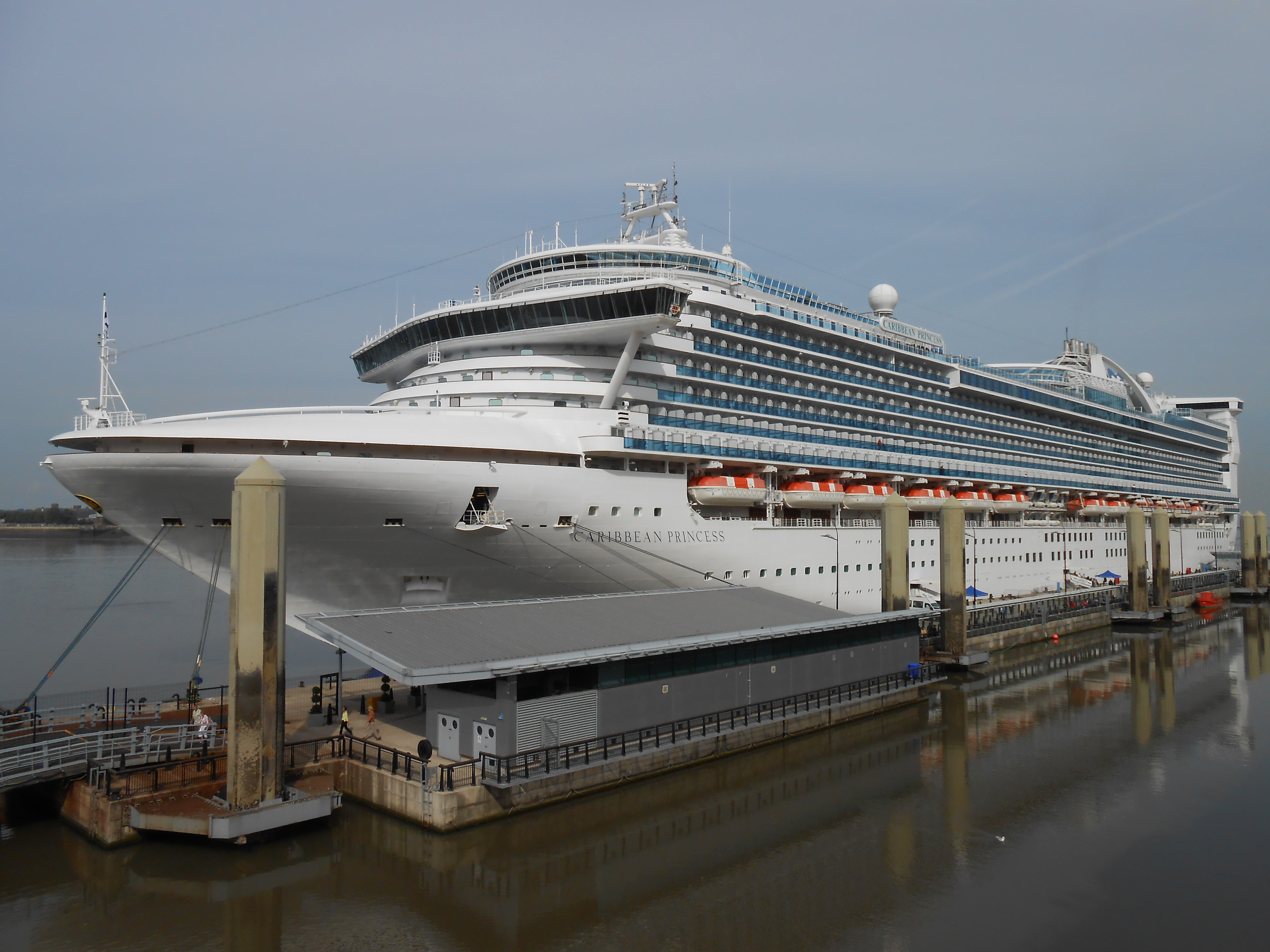
Princess Cruises received a record fine for illegally altering its oily water separator and polluting marine waters

In the United States, magic pipe cases often attract large fines for shipping lines, and prison sentences for crew. Cases are often brought to light by whistle blowers, including a 2016 case involving Princess Cruises, which resulted in a record US$40 million fine. In April 2021 a ship engineer on the Zao Galaxy, an oil tanker, was convicted of intentionally dumping oily bilge water in February 2019, along with witness tampering and submitting false paperwork in an attempt to conceal the crime. He received a $2,500 fine and was sentenced to three years of probation and 200 hours of community service. The ship operator was fined US$1.65 million and ordered to "implement a comprehensive Environmental Compliance Plan."

On older OWS systems bypass pipes were fitted with regulatory approval. These approved pipes are no longer fitted on newer vessels.

In some serious emergencies ship's crews are allowed to discharge untreated bilge water overboard, but they need to declare these emergencies in the ship's records and oil record book. Unregistered discharges violate the MARPOL 73/78 international pollution control treaty.

== Motivation and responsibility ==
The problem is worsened by a lack of facilities in developing countries; some port reception facilities do not allow for oily water to be discharged easily and cost effectively. Crew members, engineers, and ship owners can receive huge fines and even imprisonment if they continue to use a magic pipe to pollute the environment.

Conclusively, some engineers use the magic pipe manipulation technique because of:

- Lack of training
- Lack of shore side assistance with regard to bilge water treatment
- Simple disregard of the ocean environment.

== Proper process ==
The oily bilge waste comes from a ship's engines and fuel systems. The waste is required to be offloaded when a ship is in port and either burned in an incinerator or taken to a waste management facility. In rare occasions, bilge water can be discharged into the ocean but only after almost all oil is separated out.

== See also ==
- International Maritime Organization – Regulatory agency
- Marpol Annex I – Detailed implementation of Marpol 73/78
- Oil–water separator (general)
- Oil content meter
- Oil discharge monitoring equipment
