= OWS =

OWS may refer to

- Occupy Wall Street, a political protest starting in 2011 that originated in New York City at Zucotti Park
- OGC Web Service Common, a standard of the Open Geospatial Consortium
- Oil–water separator, a device to separate oil and water
- Oily water separator, shipboard equipment
- Old Watercolour Society, London, since 1881 the Royal Watercolour Society. Member artists used OWS as a post-nominal, while this was its name.
- Open water swimming, outdoor swimming in open lakes, rivers, and oceans
- Open Whisper Systems, a nonprofit open-source software group
- Open Window School, a private school located in Bellevue, Washington
- Operation Warp Speed, the United States national program to accelerate the development, manufacturing, and distribution of COVID-19 vaccines, therapeutics, and diagnostics.
- Opioid Withdrawal Syndrome
- Optional White Space (computer science), sometimes used when defining a grammar or protocol specification, see Metasyntax
- Order of World Scouts, the first international Scouting organisation
- Oritsé Williams, former member of JLS
- Overhead Weapon Station, a remote weapon station
- Ocean Weather Ship (or Station), a past programme involving meteorological ships located in the ocean for use in weather forecasting
- OpenWebStart, an open-source reimplementation of Java Web Start based on IcedTea-Web
