= Marine environmental issues in Lebanon =

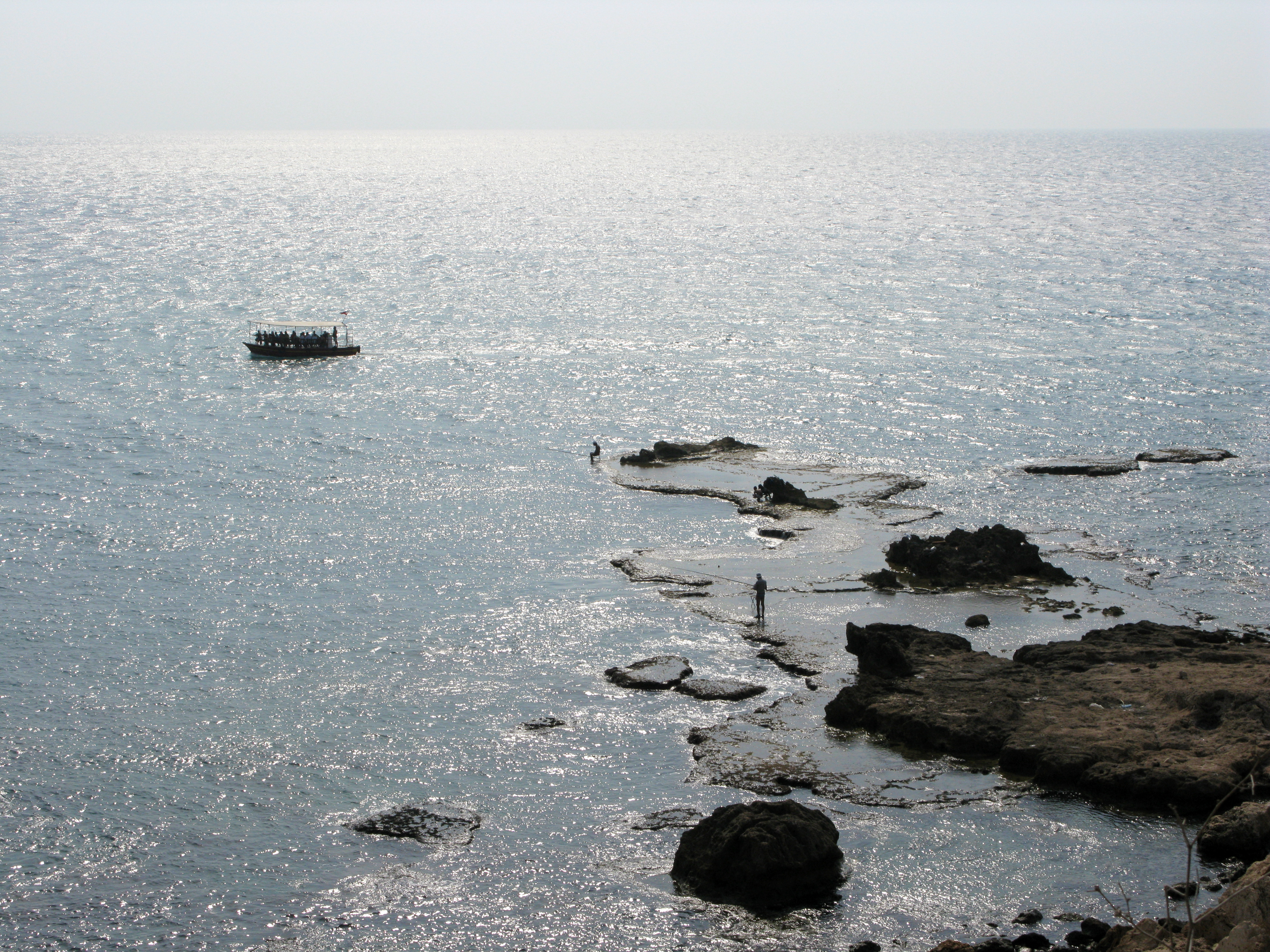
Byblos, Lebanon. A seemingly unharmed stretch of coast

A variety of factors affect the water and marine life along the coastline of Lebanon, including marine pollution, environmental impact of shipping, oil spills, noxious liquid substances spills, sewage spills, and the dumping of radioactive and medical waste.

These factors each threaten the balance of the Lebanese coastal ecosystem and, by extension, the human inhabitants of the country, such as in solid waste disposal into rivers that supply many rural villages with water and landfills in populated areas.

Despite being a hotspot for marine life within the Mediterranean, the Lebanese watershed and coastline is home to very high levels of pollution that threaten the human, animal, and plant life that rely upon it.

While action is being taken to combat the loss of marine biodiversity in the Mediterranean and Lebanon specifically, there is significant damage to the ecosystem, which needs to be addressed by both local and national governments, as well as supra- and international organisations and bodies.

== Oil spills ==
=== Jiyeh Power Station Bombing ===
The Jiyeh power station oil spill is an environmental disaster that occurred July 13 - July 16 during the 2006 Lebanon war after Israeli raids on the Jiyeh thermal power plant in Beirut, Lebanon. The oil slick covered around 150 km of the Lebanese coastline and released up 10,000 - 15,000 tons of crude oil into the sea. Parts of the oil sank to the seabed about 8m in depth, while the rest was transported toward Syria by the current. Especially affected by the oil spills were the peninsulas north of Jiyeh, ports and fishing harbors. The scale of the disaster is often compared to that of the Exxon Valdez spill and while Lebanese people suffered from this disaster, they did not receive any compensation, unlike the Deepwater Horizon $20,000,000,000 Trust.

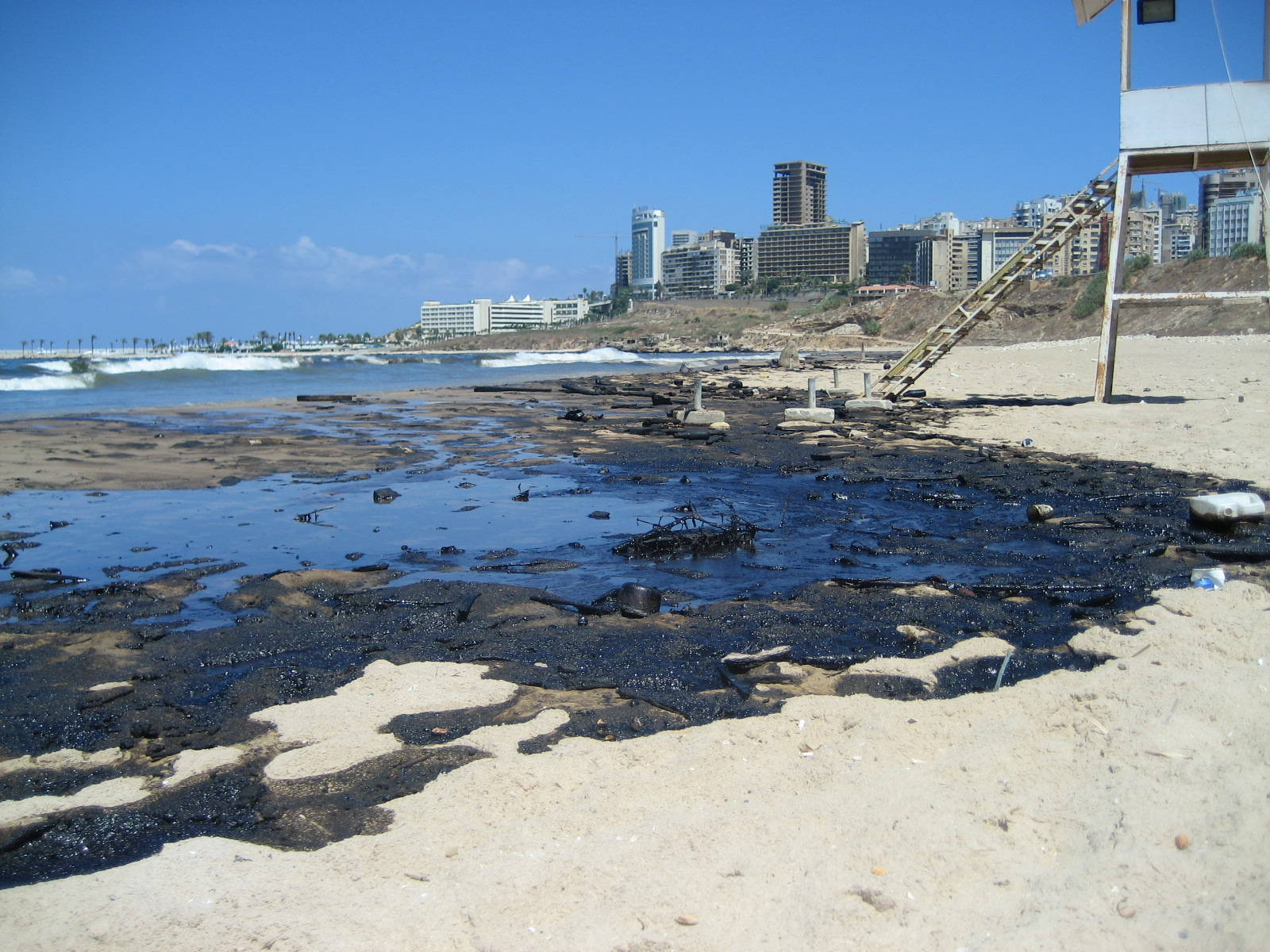
Oil from the bombed power plant of Jiyeh (south Lebanon) contaminating the beaches of Beirut - August 2006

Cleaning the oil spill proved to be very difficult for authorities in the critical early hours of the spill, mainly because of the ongoing conflict and the Israeli naval blockade, which lined the coast and continued firefights. Additionally, damaged roads prevented responders from going to the scene of the disaster, and the necessary funding for clean-up operations proved difficult to ensure. Despite the difficulties, efforts in the cleaning process were made by the civil society and non-governmental groups, since the Lebanese government was paralyzed and lacked capacity due to the war.

There were many longer lasting ecological effects to both marine life and humans due to the oil spill. Since there was a slow clean up response, the heavier crude oil sank to the bottom, killing the marine life below that many on the coast rely on. Additionally, health experts have noted that the oil spills could cause health risks, such as cancer to people living in the area. Tourist beaches were also covered in oil slick for months after the spill.

=== Oil pollution from ships ===
According to an ITOPF study, 91% of the operational oil spills are small, resulting in less than 7 metric tons per spill. Lebanese public opinion and Lebanese authorities do not react to these minor spills occurring by the merchant ships calling the Lebanese ports. Being without inspection, and discharging close to the shore, oil Tankers are polluting the coast of Amsheet, Beirut, Jieh, Tripoli, Zahrani and Zouk. These pollutions have a direct effect on the marine life in these regions. Also, big cargo ships coming to Lebanon transport the equivalent oil volume of small tankers, and are polluting essentially from their machinery space. See Marpol Annex I.

== Ballast water discharge ==
Ballast water is ocean water carried by large (cargo-) ships in order to increase the manoeuvrability and propulsion of ships, as well as to balance out potential redistributions or changes in weight, such as when cargo is loaded or unloaded, or as fuel is used over the course of the journey. Ballast water discharge typically contains a variety of biological materials, including plants, animals, viruses, and bacteria. These materials often include non-native, nuisance, and exotic species that can cause extensive ecological damage to aquatic ecosystems.

Ballast water discharges are believed to be the leading source of invasive species in Lebanese marine waters, thus posing public health and environmental risks, as well as significant economic cost to industries such as commercial and recreational fisheries, agriculture, and tourism. While there are regulations in place controlling the exchange of ballast water in the Mediterranean, evidence shows that exchanges of ballast water are occurring without meeting international regulations. Ships calling Lebanese ports discharge stagnant ballast water (without being exchanged at sea), oily ballast water, graywater and bilge water, often without regulations or sanctions by the Lebanese authorities. The migration of foreign fish into Lebanese waters began with the construction of the Suez Canal in 1869; this artificial waterway was used as a maritime trading route, providing easy access to the Mediterranean, but due to the disposal of ballast water that is not in line with the International Maritime Organisation's regulations, many non-native species are finding their way into Lebanese waters. As much as 30% of the Lebanese marine population is foreign to the area. Some of the new species have no natural predators in Lebanese waters, growing to proportions that threaten local fish populations and upset the balance of the aquatic ecosystem.

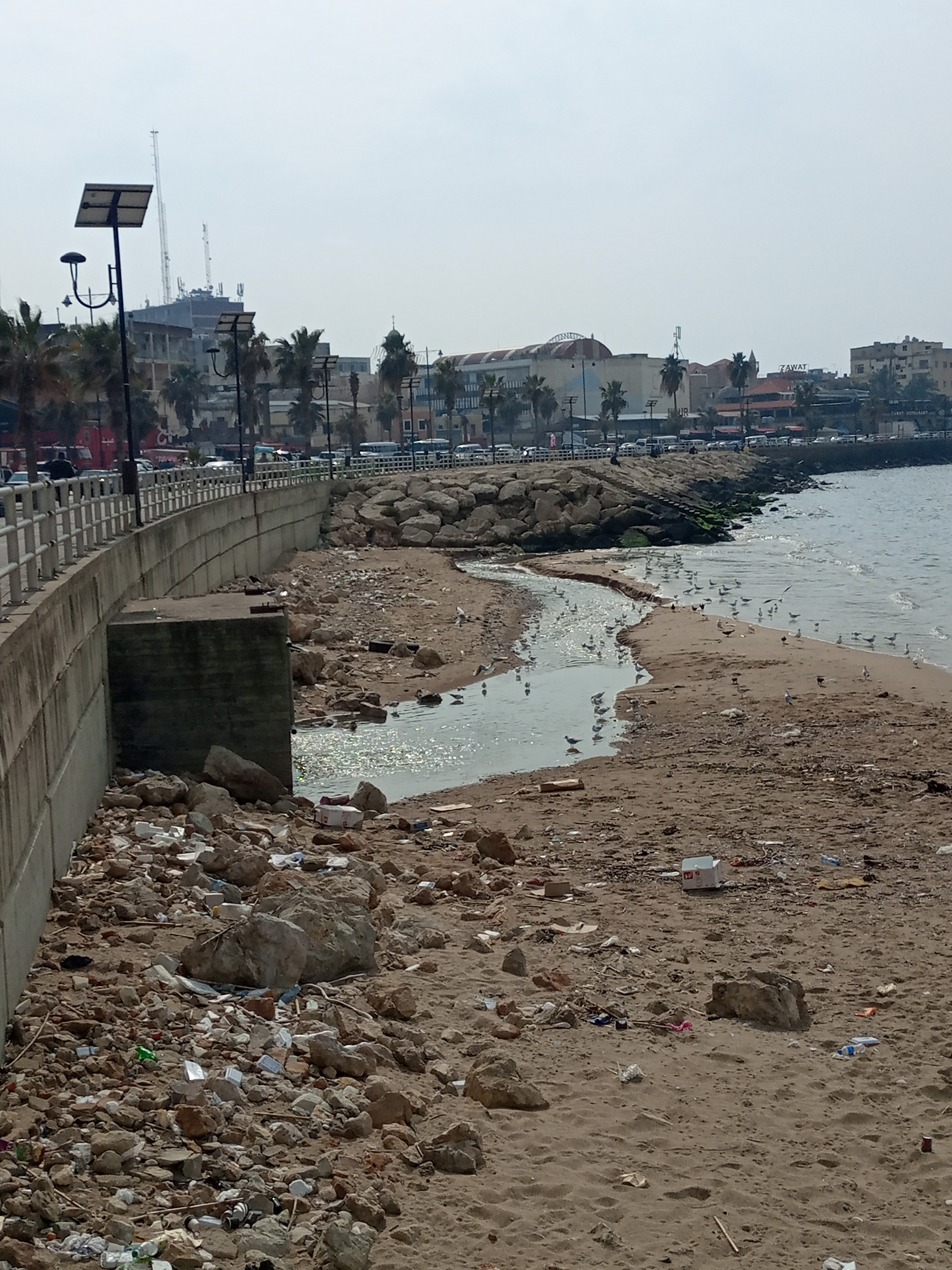
An estuary belonging to the sewage system of the city of Sidon in Lebanon.

== Sewage spills ==
Sewage management is a major issue within Lebanon. It is not uncommon for homes or buildings to dispose of their waste into natural water ways or man-made waste pools. In 2016 only 58.5% of buildings in Lebanon were connected to the sewer system. The other 41.5% of buildings used septic tanks, waste pools, or natural water sources (streams, rivers, lakes, etc.) to dispose of their sewage. This is a major issue within the country, as poor water quality has been linked to around 80% of all diseases. Additionally, it is not uncommon for sewage coming from buildings on the coast to flow directly into the Mediterranean without treatment, polluting marine life and beaches.

Another sewage issue is the sewage pollution of ships. Since many merchant navy vessels are not inspected, they do not respect the Marpol 73/78 annex IV which controls pollution of the sea by sewage from ships.

A study conducted on the major rivers in Lebanon in 2021 found fecal coliform in 96% percent of the samples taken throughout the study. E. coli, the bacteria found alongside fecal coliform has been proven resistant to a variety of antibiotics. People who are exposed to this bacteria are at higher risk of a variety of diseases, such as meningitis and pneumonia, ailments which cannot be cured if the bacteria is resistant to commonly used medication. The results of this study highlighted the need for proper waste management and water treatment facilities in Lebanon.

== Sea dumping ==
Sea dumping is a major contributor to the pollution of water in Lebanon. Sea dumping refers to the practice of disposing waste or debris into the ocean or along the coastline of a body of water. This practice has numerous negative effects on the health of the environment, marine life and humans in the area. Beirut, Lebanon and its suburbs produce around 3,000 tons of trash a day alone and despite being the capital of Lebanon, is often covered with trash. Another serious issue to the Lebanese marine environment is the dumping of rubbish from lorries as well as from ships. There have been a number of cases, particularly involving Sukleen, dumping its waste (including radioactive waste and hazardous medical waste) in the vicinity of the Karantina region. There are also many waste disposal locations on the Lebanese coast especially near Saida port, Bourj Hammoud, Normandie and Tripoli.

Land Reclamation

Along the coastline of Lebanon, there are large mounds of trash that extend hundreds of feet out in the Mediterranean sea. Along these mounds of trash, trucks are constantly dumping and layering on more waste. This process is called land reclamation and is the process of adding on to the pre-existing coastline.

Since 2015, Lebanon has been in a perpetual garbage crisis. The crisis began with the overflow of one of Lebanon's main landfills, the Naameh landfill in Beirut, and a lack of contingency plan by the government. This landfill was opened as an emergency solution in 1997, but has been the source of protest, due to the lack of attention and compensation for both the inhabitants of Naameh and the environment. After its shutdown in July 2015, the overflowing trash coming onto the street gave rise to the #YouStink movement, which started on social media, but had expanded to all kinds of Lebanese media by 2016. The protest was successful, and by March 2016 the government released federal funds for the opening of two new landfill sites in the suburbs Costa Brava and Bourj Hammoud, in addition to removing the mountains of trash and transferring them to the two sites nearby. However, the same issues repeated themselves in the new landfills. The government began the process of "land reclamation" and began disposing of waste into the sea. The process influences the behaviour of Lebanese population, resulting in most citizens throwing their trash out into the street, as it is known that all trash lands in the ocean, therefore suffocating any desire for real sustainability.

=== The Costa Brava and the Bourj Hammoud Landfill ===
Although the two new landfills were quick solutions to the shutdown of the Naameh landfill, a number of problems arise in the new areas. The Costa Brava predominantly an area for women-only beaches, which are now overflowing trash, and Bourj Hammoud is home to many refugees, migrant workers and a large community of Armenians. The mountains of trash formed on these landfills present an enormous liability to those communities, in addition to being regularly dumped into the sea to make more place for new trash. Further, to support the large economy of scrap metal in Lebanon, migrant workers, primarily Syrian children without papers, are exploited for trash picking, and exposed to horrible work conditions, in addition to racism from local residents.

== Noxious liquid substances spills ==
According to CNRS surveys, The Chekka sea area is polluted by Noxious chemical substances (Sulfuric acid, Phosphoric acid...). These Noxious liquid substances spills occur essentially during the Loading/discharging operations at the Sellaata chemical Terminal near Chekka. See Marpol 73/78 annex II.

== Effect on local Industries ==
The environmental effects of marine pollution through ballast water exchange, for example, impacts local industries such as fishing and tourism.

=== Privatisation of the Coastline ===
Another stressor to Lebanon's population, of which around 60% live on and around the coast's bustling urban areas, is the steady privatisation of large parts of Lebanon's coast. Investors often commence construction of industrial complexes or leisure centres, both of which contribute to environmental stress, as well as putting an economic and social strain on the local population.

This affects the tourist industry as well. While many Lebanese and foreign tourists have shown an interest in ecotourism in recent years, pollution and lack of government funding impact the industry negatively, costing many their livelihoods.

== Environmental Protection Efforts ==
=== Projects ===
While Lebanon's marine environment is not receiving enough attention from national and international politics, several projects have been launched contributing to marine research, making information on the environment more accessible, and to the development of more comprehensive guidelines that will benefit authorities, locals and the planet, such as the Deep Sea Lebanon Project. Since the project's launch in 2016, over 600 species that had not previously been documented in Lebanon were found, of which 3 had not been recorded in science anywhere.

Other Projects, such as the ReMal, a cooperative initiative launched by Lebanon, Germany and the UN aiming to improve municipal waste systems and limit the amount of pollutants reaching the Mediterranean Sea. This project also hoped to strengthen municipal coastal unions in enforcing the Integrated Solid Waste Management Law of Lebanon, in order to reduce marine litter.

A delegation of the European Union in Lebanon set up another project, whose primary focus was conducting research on marine life, including biodiversity, altering habitats and the impact of environmental stressors.

=== Ecotourism ===
The global trend for more sustainable ways of going on holiday has gained popularity in Lebanon in recent years, as well. Many Lebanese nationals can no longer afford to travel abroad, partly due to economic instability and the COVID-19 pandemic, and are choosing to vacation around Lebanon's natural landscapes.

Foreign tourism makes up as much as 19% of Lebanon's GDP in 2018, and while conventional tourism fluctuated due to a miscellany of issues, such as political instability, the refugee crisis and environmental degradation. Ecotourism in Lebanon is threatened by biodiversity loss, habitat fragmentation and pollution of land and sea, in response to which the Ministry of Environment has declared more protected areas of nature in Lebanon, but economic and political incentives often hinder conservation efforts.
