= Environment of Lebanon =

One of the major environmental issues in Lebanon is water supply. The country has greater water resources than many other Middle Eastern countries; however, it is at increasing risk of shortages, particularly during the dry summers. This is due to lack of storage capacity, to increasing demand, and to climate change. Large-scale projects to improve water supply are funded by the government and by foreign agencies, and include the Greater Beirut Water Supply Project and the Litani River Authority.

A large number of environmental non-government organizations have been established in Lebanon.

== NGOs ==
Compared to other regions in the world, the Middle East has been very slow in developing environmental non-government organizations (NGOs). In the mid 1990s, about 120 NGOs were created in Lebanon. Some of these NGOs include the Association Al tanmia (AA), Al Ain Association for Development (AAD), Ard Al Tofoula (AAT), and Association for Charity & Culture (ACC).

== Water crisis ==
Lebanon is known for being one of the few countries in the Middle East with adequate water. Not only do several large rivers surround Lebanon, but Lebanon also has the highest annual rainfall in the region, averaging 827mm. But in the summertime especially, there is limited water for the residents to use. The main problem is that there a few places for water to be stored. Also, much of Lebanon's drinking water flows out into the Mediterranean Sea. These problems also go along with the higher demand of water and the leaky system of pipes and reservoirs. Lebanon is in need of an upgraded water network in order to avoid chronic water shortages predicted in the year 2020.

=== Climate ===
Recently, not only has rainfall severely declined in Lebanon, but the rising climate has also been affecting the amount of water available. It is estimated that about 50% of the rainfall evaporates leaving people of Lebanon little to work with. As a result of climate change, temperatures have been rising, which means more water lost to evapotranspiration. Losing the water produced by rainfall to evapotranspiration then creates a higher demand for irrigation in farmlands. While agriculture has been suffering the most from the drought, Lebanese households are also expected to go through further water rationing as the dry season arrives.

=== Rising population ===
Lebanese make up about four million people in Lebanon. This number does not include the mass number of Syrian refugees that have fled to Lebanon from Syria to avoid the Syrian Civil War, or tourists. In order to escape civil unrest in Syria, massive numbers of people fled to Lebanon. In April 2014, it was estimated that around a quarter of Lebanon's population was Syrian refugees. This mass number of refugees fleeing to Lebanon has created a huge strain on Lebanon's resources and according to the minister of foreign policies of Lebanon, Gebran Bassil, is still threatening Lebanon's existence today. This rising number of people in Lebanon is creating a higher demand of water, which Lebanon is unable to satisfy. In order to prevent this threat in the future, there are many projects being put in place to help Lebanon with their environmental problems.

== Environmental projects ==
=== The Greater Beirut Water Supply Project ===
The aim of the Greater Beirut Water Supply Project (GBWSP) is to provide water from the Litani River as well as the Awali River, for those who live in the region of Greater Beirut. It aims to get water to those who have a low income within the Greater Beirut area. It is also focused on increasing short-term supply of potable water for those areas as well. About 40% of Lebanon's populations is located in the Greater Beirut region. Over the last forty years, the Lebanese population living in this region have experienced water shortages due to the lack of water distribution and increased demand of water. This shortage in water stems from the political conflicts that Lebanon has been experiencing over the previous years and even still today.

The Greater Beirut Water Supply Project is a project the Lebanese government has been considering since the 1960s and 1990s. A request for inspection relating to GBWSP was registered by the inspection panel on November 10, 2010.It was approved on December 16, 2010, by the World Bank's board of directors. The cost of this whole project is 370 million dollars. The International Bank for Reconstruction and Development (IBRD) will be responsible for paying about 200 million dollars and the rest will be paid by the Government of Lebanon and the Beirut Mount Lebanon Water Establishment. Lebanon’s Ministry of Energy and Water (MoEW) will be responsible for executing the project and will delegate implementation, monitoring and reporting responsibilities to the Council for Development and Reconstruction (CDR) and the BMLWE.

Improving the water supply in the Greater Beirut area would have a positive impact on about 2.1 million people, which is around half of Lebanon's population. This would also include about 350,000 people living in lower income neighborhoods. Also, many residents who live on the top floors of apartments do not receive water because of the low water pressure in the pipes. Fixing these pipes will allow residents living on top floors to have better access to water. The quality of water will also improve and be in line with international standards, while also being much more consistent. This project will also help many people in Lebanon save money. Today, in order to get clean water, many residents rely on private water for drinkable water. It is estimated that around $308 million per year is spent on private water by households.

=== Litani River Authority ===
The Litani River Basin Management Support program (LRBMS) was put in place by USAID so they could to find a solution for the water management issues. They put the Litani River Authority in charge, so they could harness the water resources of the Litani River. The Litani River Authority was established in 1954. It was put in place to provide an increase in irrigated land, generate electricity, and develop recreational pieces of land. Some solutions they came up with to reverse negative trends and establish sustainable water management practices are infrastructure development, control withdrawals and releases, prevent abuses such as industrial wastewater discharges and groundwater over-extraction, better water governance, and raising awareness. Over the past four years, the Litani River Basin Management Support program has been building the Litani River Authority's technical capacity in order to monitor water quality and quantity, manage irrigation systems, plan for natural risks, and engage residents in responsible water use.

== Environmental issues in Lebanon ==
See Marine environmental issues in Lebanon
