= Oil discharge monitoring equipment =

System to record oil content of a ships wastewater

Oil discharge monitoring equipment (ODME) is based on a measurement of oil content in the ballast and slop water, to measure conformance with regulations. The apparatus is equipped with a GPS, data recording functionality, an oil content meter and a flow meter. By use of data interpretation, a computing unit will be able to allow the discharge to continue or it will stop it using a valve outside the deck.

== Operating principle ==
A sample point on the discharge line allows for the analyzer to determine the oil content of the ballast now and slop water in PPM. The analyzer is self-maintaining by periodical cleansings with fresh water, and therefore requires a minimum of active maintenance from the crew. The results of the analyzer are sent to a computer, which determines whether the oil content values are to result in overboard discharge or not. The valves that direct the ballast water either over board or to slop tank are controlled by the integrated computer, and a GPS signal further automates the process by including special areas and completes the required input for the Oil Record Book.

All oil tankers with a gross tonnage of larger than 150 must have efficient Oil Discharge Monitoring Equipment on board.

The oily discharge is sent out to sea through a pump. The oily mixture has to pass through a series of sensors to determine whether it is acceptable to be sent to the discharge pipe.

Based on regulations, the following values must be recorded by the system:

- Date and time of the discharge
- Location of the ship
- Oil content of the discharge in ppm
- Total quantity discharged
- Discharge rate

All records of Oil Detection Monitoring Equipment must be stored on board ships for no less than 3 years.

Oil Discharge Monitoring systems today consist of a computing unit that is installed in the cargo control room. The computer unit control and receives data from other ODME components.

ODME systems also have an analyzing unit that contains the Oil content meter, a fresh water valve for cleaning purposes, and a pressure transmitter that monitors the sample flow through the measuring cell.

== See also ==
- Marpol 73/78 – International marine environmental convention
- Marpol Annex I – 1983 convention on ocean pollution
- Oily water separators – Device to separate oil and water
- Oily water separator (marine) – Marine piece of equipment that separates oil and water mixtures
- Oil Content Meter – Device for monitoring oil levels in shipboard water discharges
- Magic Pipe – Trick in a ship's waste-handling equipment to circumvent pollution regulations
- IMO – Specialized agency of the United Nations
- Port Reception Facilities – Facilities in ports for receiving waste and residues from ships
