= Oil record book =

Records all oil and fuel movements within a ship

All cargo vessels where the MARPOL Convention is applicable must have an oil record book in which the officer responsible will record all oil or sludge transfers and discharges within the vessel. This is necessary for authorities to be able to monitor if a vessel's crew has properly disposed of their oil discharges at sea.

Each oil tanker of 150 gross tons and above, ship of 400 gross tons and above other than an oil tanker, and crewed fixed or floating drilling rig or other platform shall maintain an Oil Record Book Part I (Machinery Space Operations). An oil tanker of 150 gross tons and above or a non-oil tanker that carries 200 cubic meters or more of oil in bulk, shall also maintain an Oil Record Book Part II (Cargo/Ballast Operation).

== Oil record book coding ==
In every entry the chief engineer must record tank number, location, type of oil, description of operation, and quantity. For every operation a combined numerical and letter coding is applied. MEPC.187(59) describes the codes applicable as from 1 January 2011.

According with revised MEPC.1/Circ736/Rev.2, issued 6 October 2011, additional amendments to oil record book entries have been implemented by IMO.

The first part of the oil record book deals with machinery space operations for all ships. The second part of the oil record book is for cargo/ballast operations and this part only needs to be filled out by crew members aboard oil tankers.

Entries shall be made in the oil record book on each occasion, on a tank to tank basis if appropriate, whenever any of the following machinery space operations take place on any ship to which this section applies—

1. Ballasting or cleaning of fuel oil tanks;
2. Discharge of ballast containing an oily mixture or cleaning water from fuel oil tanks;
3. Disposal of oil residue; and
4. Discharge overboard or disposal otherwise of bilge water that has accumulated in machinery spaces.

Entries shall be made in the oil record book on each occasion, on a tank to tank basis if appropriate, whenever any of the following cargo/ballast operations take place on any oil tanker to which this section applies—

1. Loading of oil cargo;
2. Internal transfer of oil cargo during voyage;
3. Unloading of oil cargo;
4. Ballasting of cargo tanks and dedicated clean ballast tanks;
5. Cleaning of cargo tanks including crude oil washing;
6. Discharge of ballast except from segregated ballast tanks;
7. Discharge of water from slop tanks;
8. Closing of all applicable valves or similar devices after slop tank discharge operations;
9. Closing of valves necessary for isolation of dedicated clean ballast tanks from cargo and stripping lines after slop tank discharge operations; and
10. Disposal of oil residue.

== Electronic oil record book ==
An electronic alternative to handwritten oil record book is used on board vessels of all sizes. Marine electronic oil record books must meet the specific reporting requirements of IMO, SOLAS and flag states. Manually inserted information is normally combined with data recorded from the vessel's instruments and sensors, such as GPS data (time and position), flow-meters and tank gauges.

== See also ==
- International Maritime Organization
- MARPOL 73/78
- Marpol Annex I
- Oil discharge monitoring equipment
- Oil Pollution Act of 1961
- Oil Pollution Act of 1973
- Oil content meter
- Oily water separator (marine)
- Oil–water separator
- Port reception facilities
