= Alfred Tarazi =

- ألفريد طرزي
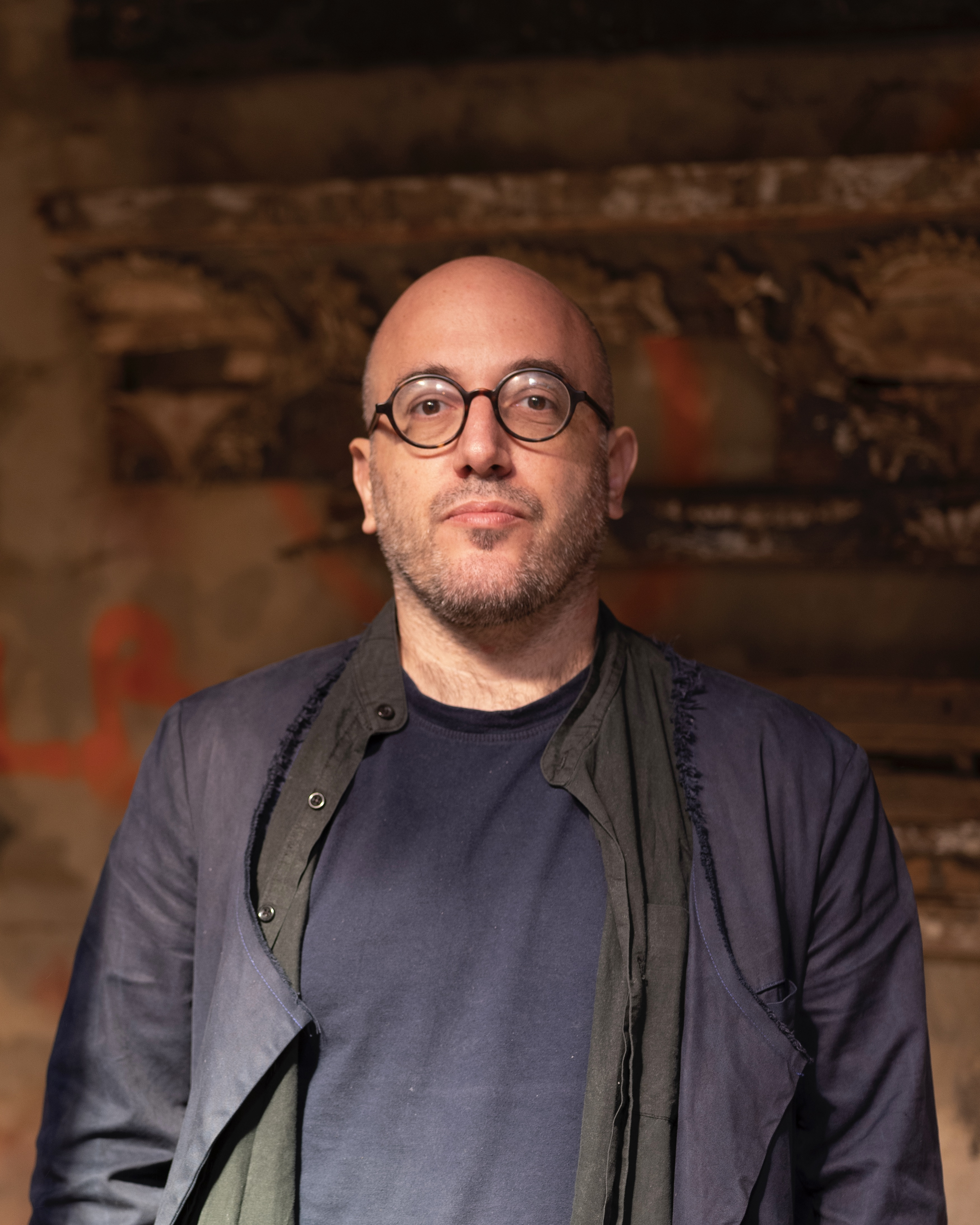
- Tarazi in 2022
- Born: 1980 (age 45–46); Beirut, Lebanon
- Education: Graphic design
- Alma mater: American University of Beirut
- Website: www.alfredtarazi.com

Alfred Tarazi (Arabic: ألفريد طرزي; born in 1980 in Beirut), is a Lebanese artist. Tarazi is a multidisciplinary artist who works with mediums such as painting, photography, drawing, digital collage, sculpture, and installation, reinterpreting the memories of the Lebanese Civil War.

Part of the post-war generation, Tarazi explores its impacts on political, geographical, and social spheres. His art seeks to create a connection with this tumultuous period, using archival photos and documents as elements of his artistic process. Through digital collages, Tarazi mixes images of Lebanon before and after the conflict, introducing past events to the viewer in the present.

Tarazi holds the view that print culture of the 20th century significantly symbolizes modernity in the Middle East.

His studio is located in the Karantina area where he has found many magazines, books, newspaper archives, and miscellaneous items that he uses as part of his artistic process.

In 2011, Tarazi completed a residency at Krinzinger Projekte, Vienna. Galerie Krinzinger would later host his first solo exhibition in Europe in Vienna, Austria in 2015.

== Awards ==
Tarazi received the Moving Narratives Mentorship prize awarded by the Prince Claus Fund and British Council in 2024. He has received the Lokman Slim Prize in 2023 which was awarded to Tarazi on the second anniversary of the publisher, researcher and political activist Lokman Slim's assassination.

== Exhibitions ==
=== Solo ===
- Fragments for a silent film, Installation, American University of Beirut (2004)
- The sky ever so blue, Bastakiya Art Fair, Dubai (2009)
- The Quixote Project, Dar Al Funoon, Kuwait (2009)
- You're Young And You'll Forget, The Running Horse Contemporary Art Space, Beirut (2010)
- In A Sea Of Oblivion (The Feel Collective), The Dome City Centre, Beirut (2010)
- A Moment Of Truth, Krinzinger Projekte, Vienna (2011)
- Diall 911 For The New Middle East, The Running Horse Contemporary Art Space, Beirut (2011)
- The Oath, The Running Horse Contemporary Art Space, Beirut (2012)
- The Oath, Umam Centre for Documentation and Research, Beirut (2012)
- The Senseless Realm, Galerie Krinzinger, Vienna (2015)
- An Empty Plot Of Land, Galerie Janine Rubeiz, Beirut (2015)
- Monument To Dust, Institut Français, Beirut (2015)
- Dear Madness, Galerie Janine Rubeiz, Beirut (2017)
- Memory of a Paper City, Umam Centre for Documentation and Research, Beirut (2022)
- A Nation's Inflation, Castello 2432, Venice (2022)
- Hymne a l'amour, The National Museum of Beirut, Beirut (2022)

=== Group ===
- Rhythm Of Union, Beirut (2000)
- Spiritual Promises From Lost Prophets, Cordy House, London (2008)
- The Cloud (Atelier Hapsitus), Creek Art Fair, Dubai (2008)
- The Sky Ever So Blue, Sursock Museum, Beirut (2008)
- An Endless Breath Away, Creek Art Fair, Dubai (2008)
- Manpower, Cosmicmegabrain Collective, Lisbon (2009)
- Blank To Basics, The Running Horse Contemporary Art Space, Beirut (2009)
- In The Trenches, The Running Horse Contemporary Art Space, Beirut (2011)
- Shabab Uprising, Ayyam Gallery, Beirut (2011)
- Rebirth, Beirut Exhibition Centre, Beirut (2011)
- Rebirth, Vienna Kunsthalle, Vienna (2011)
- Subtitled With Narratives From Lebanon, Royal College of Art, London (2011)
- Art Is The Answer, Boghossian Foundation, Villa Empain, Brussels (2012)
- Beirut 2, Contemporary Art Platform, Kuwait (2012)
- Journeys Through Our Heritage, Beirut Exhibition Centre, Beirut (2013)
- Contemporary Lebanon: Art Beyon Violence, Singapore Art Fair, Singapore (2014)
- Excavating The Sky (Sigil), Venice Biennale of Architecture, Venice (2014)
- Current Power in Syria (Sigil), Marrakech Biennale 6, Marakkech (2016)
- Monuments of the Everyday (Sigil), Oslo Architecture Triennial, Oslo (2016)
- Syria into The Light: The Revolution Is A Mirror (Sigil), Concrete, Dubai (2017)
- Fruits Of Sleep (Sigil), Sharjah Biennial 14, Sursock Museum, Beirut (2017)
- Monuments of The Everyday (Sigil), CCS Bard Galleries, New York (2017)
- Birdsong (Sigil) Broken Nature, XXII Triennale di Milano, Milan (2019)
- Anatomy of Two Revolution, Design & Nostalgia, Beirut Design Week, Beirut (2019)
- Hope And Despair, Nabu Museum, El Heri, Lebanon (2020)
- Where To Now?, Krinzinger Shottenfeld, Vienna (2023)
- 30 Years Of Color, Galerie Janine Rubeiz, Beirut (2023)
- The Circle Was A Point, Barjeel Art Foundation, Dubai (2024)
