= Crude oil washing =

Tank-cleaning method using crude oil to remove residues on oil tankers

Crude oil washing (COW) is the process of washing out residue from oil tankers using the crude oil itself.

After the oil tankers have been emptied, crude oil is pumped back and preheated in the slop tanks, then sprayed back with high-pressure nozzles in the cargo tanks onto the walls of the tank. Due to the stickiness of the crude oil, it clings to the tank walls, and such oil adds to the cargo remaining on board. By washing the tanks with crude oil, the amount of cargo remaining on board is significantly reduced, and with the high value of oil, the financial savings are significant, both for the charterer and the ship-owner. If the cargo remaining on board is deemed as 'liquid and pumpable', then the charterers can claim from the owner for any cargo loss for normally between 0.3% up to 0.5%. It replaced the load-on-top and seawater washing systems, both of which involved discharging oil-contaminated water into the sea. MARPOL 73/78 made crude oil washing equipment mandatory for oil tankers of 20,000 tons or greater deadweight.

Although crude oil washing is most notable for actual tankers, the current chairman for Hashimoto Technical Service, Hashimoto Akiyoshi, applied the method in washing refinery plant oil tanks in Japan. Hashimoto is currently using this method in the Kyushu, Chugoku, and Tohoku regions in Japan.

== Seawater washing ==
Originally, oil tankers used one set of tanks for cargo, and about one third of the tanks were for the water ballast on their empty trips. High-pressure jets of hot seawater were used to clean the tanks, and the mixture of seawater and residue called slops was discharged into the sea, as well as the oil-contaminated ballast water. The 1954 OILPOL Convention attempted to reduce the harm by prohibiting such discharges within 50 miles (80 km) of most land and 100 miles (160 km) of certain sensitive areas.

== Load-on-top ==
The discharges from seawater washing were still considered a problem, so during the 1960s, the load-on-top approach began to be adopted. The mixture of cleaning water and residue was pumped into a slop tank, which allowed them to separate by their different densities into oil and water during the journey. The water portion was then discharged, leaving only crude oil in the slop tank. The crude oil was then pumped into the main tanks and the new cargo loaded on top of it, recovering as much as 800 tons of oil which was formerly discarded.

== History ==
Even with the load-on-top process, there is still some oil in the discharged water from the slop tank. Starting in the 1970s, equipment capable of using crude oil itself for washing began to replace the water-based washing, leading to the modern-day technique of crude oil washing. The process reduces the remaining discharge of oil-contaminated water and increases the amount of cargo discharged, providing a further benefit to the cargo owner.

Crude oil washing equipment became mandatory for new tankers of 20,000 tons or more deadweight with the 1978 Protocol to the 1973 MARPOL Convention. Revised specifications for the equipment were introduced in 1999.

Modern tankers also use segregated ballast tanks, which remove the problem of discharge of oily ballast water.

== See also ==
- Maritime environmental crime
- MARPOL 73/78
