= Karantina =

Neighborhood in Beirut

Coordinates: 33°54′N 35°32′E

- Interactive map of Karantina

La Quarantine, which is colloquially referred to as Karantina (Arabic: الكرنتينا) and sometimes spelled Quarantina, is a predominantly low-income, mixed-use residential, commercial, and semi-industrial neighborhood in northeastern Beirut. The neighborhood lies east of the Port of Beirut, which also encircles it from the north, west of the Beirut River and north of the Charles Helou highway and the Achrafieh district of Beirut.

The neighborhood gets its name from the French term, La Quarantaine, because it was the location where a lazaretto for travellers was built at the request of Ibrahim Pasha, the son of Muhammad Ali Pasha, the Governor of Egypt, who controlled Syria and Beirut in 1831. The lazaretto was to be managed by a committee made up of the Austrian, Danish, French, Greek, and Spanish consuls.

In 1951, 1,300 Palestinian refugees were settled in the area. By the mid-1970s, the neighborhood had become a slum of 27,000 people– primarily Palestinians, Armenians, Kurds, Syrians and Lebanese Muslims. It was also a base for PLO and LNM paramilitary groups who engaged in battle during the Lebanese Civil War marking the area as a military target by opposing factions, particularly Lebanese Christians based in the nearby Ashrifieh neighborhoods. In January 1976, at the height of the first phase of the Lebanese Civil War, the Karantina district was deemed a danger for the residents of East Beirut and following multiple attacks by Christian militias with the purpose of clearing out the PLO and LNM elements, the population was expelled and militants were neutralized in heavy fighting, followed by the Karantina massacre by the right-wing Lebanese Front, leaving around 1,500 people dead.

Industries in La Quarantine used to be centered on the production of glass, furniture, tile and bricks, leather products, but many of these industries were replaced with the production of metal-based, cereal silos, tanneries and artisanal industries.

The area is one of the most polluted parts of the city due to its vicinity to the port as well as the presence of the city slaughterhouse (which is now closed) and a RAMCO (formerly Sukleen) waste disposal and treatment center.

The southern part of the neighborhood adjacent to the highway is home to various commercial establishments, such as the Forum de Beyrouth, the multipurpose events center that hosted Beirut Rock Festival in 2009. B 018, the renowned nightclub is also located in the area, as well as others such as KED and Grand Factory.

An increasing number of art galleries have opened or relocated to the neighborhood such as Joy Mardini's Art Factum Gallery, located in a former steel factory, which opened in 2011.

== Environmental issues ==
See Sea dumping in Karantina.

== In fiction ==
- The Cyclist: A Novel by Viken Berberian, Barnes & Noble Discover Great New Writers (2002), recipient of the Centre national du livre award (2010).

== See also ==
- Alfred Tarazi
