= Marpol Annex II =

1987 annex to marine environmental convention

Marpol Annex II is the second implemetation made by MARPOL 73/78, one of the most important marine environmental conventions. The convention was designed to minimize pollution of the seas from ships. The objective of the convention is to preserve the marine environment through the complete elimination of pollution by noxious liquid substances in bulk. Annex II restricts the quantity and type of noxious liquid substances which can be discharged into the sea. In addition, it creates the requirement for all vessels over 150 gross tonnes carrying noxious liquid substances (such as chemical tankers) to carry a Shipboard Marine Pollution Emergency Plan (SMPEP).

== Special Areas ==
Marpol establishes "Special Areas", which is defined in Marpol as sea areas which "for technical reasons relating to their oceanographical and ecological condition and to their sea traffic, the adoption of special mandatory methods for the prevention of sea pollution is required". Under the convention, these special areas are provided with a higher level of protection than other areas of the sea.

There is only a single special area under Annex II of Marpol, which is the Antarctic Area. This special area was adopted by the IMO in October 1992 and came into force in July 1994.
