= Chekka =

City in North Lebanon

Chekka شكا
- City
- Location within Lebanon
- Coordinates: 34°20′N 35°44′E
- Country: Lebanon
- Governorate: North Governorate
- District: Batroun District
- Highest elevation: 200 m (660 ft)
- Lowest elevation: 22 m (72 ft)
- Time zone: UTC+2 (EET)
  - Summer (DST): UTC+3 (EEST)
- Dialing code: +961

Chekka (Arabic: شكا, romanized: Shekkā) is a coastal town located in North Lebanon. It is located north of Râs ach-Chaq’a’ and Herri beaches, or Theoprosopon of classical times and south of the ancient Phoenician port of Enfeh and the city of Tripoli. The origin of the word is believed to be Canaanite from the word Chikitta. Chikitta was mentioned Amarna letters in Egypt as a coastal town situated in the geographical area of modern Chekka. Until now there are no Canaanite archeological findings in Chekka backing this hypothesis. Chekka's modern history is clear. The high land in Chekka now known as Chekka Al-Atika was resettled around 300 years ago and the fertile valley of Chekka was cultivated in the intention of making Chekka a Maronite stronghold on the Lebanese coast. Many families moved from Mount Lebanon to Chekka at that time.

Chekka is rich in freshwater submarine springs. The American University of Beirut's Faculty of Engineering investigated the potential of sustainable exploitation of the Chekka Bay submarine springs in 2000.

== Economy ==
Chekka is home to some of the largest cement and paper factories in the eastern Mediterranean. Companies such as Holcim Liban, Cimenterie Nationale S.A.L and Société Libanaise des Ciments Blancs S.A.L.B, headquartered in Chekka. The ancient process of extracting salt from the sea is still practiced in Chekka but without traditional wind powered water pumps. Chekka is also an agricultural city.

== Education and youth ==
Public and private schools in Chekka include Sainte Famille Maronite and Les moines libanais private Maronite schools. Université Saint-Esprit de Kaslik has a branch in Chekka for law, business majors and architecture.

== People and diaspora ==
According to the official voter lists issued by the Lebanese Ministry of Interior for the year 2014, Chekka has a Christian majority (91.44% of all registered voters), mostly Maronite Catholics (57.91%) and Greek Orthodox (28.28%), with a small Sunni Muslims minority (7.04%). It has many Maronite Christian, Greek Orthodox and Greek Catholic churches.

The Current Maronite archbishop of Tripoli Joseph Soueif was born in Chekka. He was the bishop of the Maronite Catholic Archeparchy of Cyprus till 29 October 2020.

Around 17,000 people are currently residing in Chekka many of which come originally from villages such as Tannourine, Zgharta and Bcharre. Chekka has a rich diaspora in Australia, Canada, France, the Persian Gulf and the USA.

== Sports ==
There are several sports teams that represent Chekka. The Chekka soccer club won the north district soccer championship in 2005-06, and have finished on the podium ever since. There are several other sports clubs in the region such as the Chekka ‘Saint famille’ Basketball club. Speed Ball volleyball club, one of Chekka's most ancient volleyball clubs, was the champion of the Lebanese volleyball three years in a row, 2017 2018 2019, and has represented Lebanese volleyball in Tunisia in 2019.

== Environmental issues ==
See Noxious liquid substances spills in Chekka region.
