= Marpol Annex V =

1988 annex to marine environmental convention

Marpol Annex V is the fifth implementation made by MARPOL 73/78. The official title of the annex is "Regulations for the prevention of pollution by garbage from ships". The International Maritime Organization considers this Annex an important part of Marpol due to garbage being as deadly to marine life as oil or chemicals.

The Annex applies to all ships of 100 gross tonnage and above, every ship certified to carry 15 persons or more and every fixed or floating offshore platform.

== Definition of garbage ==
Annex V defines both 'garbage' and each individual garbage type, in order to provide clarity and prevent ambiguity.

Garbage means all kinds of food wastes, domestic wastes and operational wastes, all plastics, cargo residues, incinerator ashes, cooking oil, fishing gear, and animal carcasses generated during the normal operation of the ship and liable to be disposed of continuously or periodically except those substances which are defined or listed in other Annexes to the present Convention. Garbage does not include fresh fish and parts thereof generated as a result of fishing activities undertaken during the voyage, or as a result of aquaculture activities which involve the transport of fish including shellfish for placement in the aquaculture facility and the transport of harvested fish including shellfish from such facilities to shore for processing.

— International Maritime Organisation, Marpol 73/78, Annex V

== Special Areas ==
Marpol establishes "Special Areas", which is defined in Marpol as sea areas which "for technical reasons relating to their oceanographical and ecological condition and to their sea traffic, the adoption of special mandatory methods for the prevention of sea pollution is required". Under the Convention, these special areas are provided with a higher level of protection than other areas of the sea.

Sea Area	Date adopted	Date of entry into force	Date in effect from
Mediterranean Sea	2 Nov 1973	31 Dec 1988	1 May 2009
Baltic Sea	2 Nov 1973	31 Dec 1988	1 Oct 1989
Black Sea	2 Nov 1973	31 Dec 1988	Not yet taken effect
Red Sea	2 Nov 1973	31 Dec 1988	Not yet taken effect
"Gulfs" area	2 Nov 1973	31 Dec 1988	1 Aug 2008
North Sea	17 Oct 1989	18 Feb 1991	18 Feb 1991
Antarctic area (south of latitude 60 degrees south)	16 Nov 1990	17 Mar 1992	17 Mar 1992
Wider Caribbean region including the Gulf of Mexico and the Caribbean Sea	4 Jul 1991	4 Apr 1993	1 May 2011
