= Marpol Annex I =

1983 convention on ocean pollution

Marpol Annex I is the first implementation made by Marpol 73/78, one of the most important international marine environmental conventions. The convention was designed to minimize pollution of the seas from ships. The objective of the convention is to preserve the marine environment through the complete elimination of pollution by oil and other harmful substances and the minimization of accidental discharge of such substances. The Marpol Annex I began to be enforced on October 2, 1983, and it details the prevention of pollution by oil and oily water.

Also in 2003, in a joint effort IMO and MEPC came out with Circ.406 Guidelines for Application of MARPOL Annex I Requirements to FPSOs and FSUs.

Later in 2006, the United States Coast Guard published Guidance for the Enforcement of MARPOL Annex I During PSC Examinations. This was a USCG policy letter that provided instruction to PSC officers with regard to Oil Record Book, Oily Water Separators, and Oil content meter inspections during PSC visits.

Chapter	Regulations	Topics
1	1-5	General: Definitions and Applications
2	6-11	Surveys and certification: Flag administration and Port State Control (PSC)
3	12-17	Machinery Space: Construction, discharge control and equipment (all ship types)
4	18-36	Cargo Areas: Construction, discharge control and equipment (oil tankers)
5	37	Shipboard oil pollution emergency plan (SOPEP)
6	38	Reception facilities
7	39	FPSOs and FSUs

The first half of Marpol Annex I deals with engine room waste. There are many new technologies and equipment that have been developed to prevent waste such as: Oily water separators (OWS), Oil Content meters (OCM), and Port Reception Facilities.

The second part of the Marpol Annex I has more to do with cleaning the cargo areas and tanks. Oil Discharge Monitoring Equipment (ODME) is a technology that has greatly helped improve efficiency and environmental protection in these areas.

== Special Areas ==
Marpol establishes "Special Areas", which is defined in Marpol as Sea areas which "for technical reasons relating to their oceanographical and ecological condition and to their sea traffic, the adoption of special mandatory methods for the prevention of sea pollution is required. Under the Convention, these special areas are provided with a higher level of protection than other areas of the sea.

These areas in relation to Annex I, are:

Sea Area	Date adopted	Date of entry into force	Date in effect from
Mediterranean Sea	2 Nov 1973	2 Oct 1983	2 Oct 1983
Baltic Sea	2 Nov 1973	2 Oct 1983	2 Oct 1983
Black Sea	2 Nov 1973	2 Oct 1983	2 Oct 1983
Red Sea	2 Nov 1973	2 Oct 1983	Not yet taken effect
"Gulfs" area	2 Nov 1973	2 Oct 1983	1 Aug 2008
Gulf of Aden	1 Dec 1987	1 Apr 1989	Not yet taken effect
Antarctic area	16 Nov 1990	17 Mar 1992	17 Mar 1992
North West European Waters	25 Sept 1997	1 Feb 1999	1 Aug 1999
Oman area of the Arabian Sea	15 Oct 2004	1 Jan 2007	Not yet taken effect
Southern South African waters	13 Oct 2006	1 Mar 2008	1 Aug 2008

== Discharge of oil overboard ==
Marpol Annex I details the discharge requirements for the prevention of pollution by oil and oily materials. It continues to enforce the oil discharge criteria described in the 1969 amendments to the 1954 Oil Pollution Convention. Discharge of oil within them have been completely outlawed but there are a few minor exceptions.

Ship Size and requirements	Discharge outside of Special Areas (Except Artic Waters)	Discharges inside of Special Areas (Except Antarctic Waters)	Discharge inside of Artic Waters	Discharge inside of Antarctic Waters
All ships below 400 gross tonnes, discharging oil or oily mixtures from machinery spaces, and: Proceeding "en route"; Operating equipment that ensures oil content of the effluent without dilution does not exceed 15 parts per million (PPM); Oily mixture does not originate from cargo pump-room bilges on oil tankers; Oily mixture, in case of oil tankers, is not mixed with oil cargo residues	Discharge Permitted	Discharge Permitted	Discharge Prohibited	Discharge Prohibited
All ships above 400 gross tonnes, discharging oil or oily mixtures from machinery spaces, and: Proceeding "en route"; Oily mixture is processed through an oil filtering equipment meeting the requirements of Marpol Annex I; Oil content of the effluent without dilution does not exceed 15 PPM; Oily mixture does not originate from cargo pump-room bilges on oil tankers; Oily mixture, in case of oil tankers, is not mixed with oil cargo residues	Discharge Permitted	Discharge Permitted	Discharge Prohibited	Discharge Prohibited
Any tanker discharging oil or oily mixtures from the cargo area of an oil tanker, and: The tanker is more than 50 nautical miles from the nearest land; The tanker is proceeding en route; The instantaneous rate of discharge of oil content does not exceed 30 liters per nautical mile; The tanker has in operation an oil discharge monitoring and control system and a slop tank arrangement as required by Marpol Annex I; The total quantity of oil discharged into the sea does not exceed for tankers delivered on or before 31/12/1979: 1/15,000th of the total quantity of the particular cargo of which the residue formed a part, and for tankers delivered after 31/12/1979: 1/30,000th of the total quantity of the particular cargo of which the residue formed a part	Discharge Permitted	Discharge Prohibited	Discharge Prohibited	Discharge Prohibited
"Stationary Ships", such as: Hotel Ships, Floating production storage and offloading Vessels.	Discharge Prohibited	Discharge Prohibited	Discharge Prohibited	Discharge Prohibited

== See also ==
- Marpol 73/78 – International marine environmental convention
- IMO – Specialized agency of the United Nations
- Oily water separators – Device to separate oil and water
- Oily water separator (marine) – Equipment to separate oil and water mixtures
- Oil content meter – Device for monitoring oil levels in shipboard water discharges
- Oil Discharge Monitoring Equipment – System to record oil content of a ships wastewater
- Magic Pipe – Trick in a ship's waste-handling equipment to circumvent pollution regulations
- International Safety Guide for Oil Tankers and Terminals – Code of practice first published in 1978
