= Port reception facilities =

Facilities in ports for receiving waste and residues from ships

Port reception facilities are a place that international shipping ports must provide to collect residues, oily mixtures, and garbage generated from an ocean-going vessel. contaminants generated by ships cannot be discharged directly to the ocean. According to MARPOL 73/78 they must be collected by the Port reception facilities all around the world. The Port reception facility must be able to receive dirty oil and other contaminants, and also provide quick and efficient services.

In March 2006, MEPC 54 emphasized the value of reception facilities that would exceed expectations in the implementation of MARPOL, and introduced a policy of "zero tolerance of illegal discharges from ships" that could only be enforced when there were adequate reception facilities in ports. Therefore, the Committee urged all Parties to MARPOL, particularly port States, to fulfill their treaty obligations to provide reception facilities for wastes generated during the normal operation of ships.

In October 2006, MEPC 55 approved an Action Plan to help the problems faced by port reception facilities. This was seen as a major challenge to overcome in order to achieve full compliance with MARPOL. The Plan was introduced by the Sub-Committee on Flag State Implementation (FSI) in order to better implement MARPOL and to increase environmental consciousness among shipping.

A new plan to manage the waste must be found and ships must be encouraged to use the port reception facilities rather than to discharge waste anywhere in the ocean. As a response, the European Community adopted the Directive 2000/59/EC on port reception facilities with the goal of eliminating discharges of ship-generated residues into the ocean. The Directive is especially aimed at increasing the prevalence and use of port reception facilities, thereby securing a cleaner and more sustainable marine environment. These ideologies were previously addressed by the MARPOL 73/78 Convention in 1973, however Member States are still encountering difficulties in fully implementing the requirements.

The Port Reception Facility Database (PRFD) went online 1 March 2006, as a module of the IMO Global Integrated Shipping Information System (GISIS). The database logs data on reception facilities detailing each category of ship-generated waste.

The Annexes of MARPOL contain detailed regulations with respect to the six main groups of harmful materials: Petroleum in any form (Annex I); Noxious Liquid Substances (NLS) carried in bulk (Annex II); Harmful substances carried in packaged form (Annex III); Sewage (Annex IV); Garbage (Annex V); and Air emissions (Annex VI).

MARPOL states that contaminants cannot be discharged into the ocean in line with the requirements stated in its annexes should be dropped of at port reception facilities. It also says that port States need to ensure that there are enough port reception facilities throughout the area to help with convenience.

In 2009, IMO created Guide to the Good Practice for Port Reception Facilities Providers and Users. MEPC.1/Circ.671. This document describes the steps that need to be taken in order to effectively dispose of waste by ships at port reception facilities.

Next in 2012, IMO released the MARPOL Requirements for Port Reception Facilities. This lists the requirements for port reception facilities to ensure that waste can be discharged without undue delay. It also discusses long standing lack of PRFs and under reporting.

Another important step was when IMO published their Standard Format for the Advanced Notification Form for Waste Delivery to Port Reception Facilities. This document details the standard format for notification by the ship to a port facility for acceptance of shipboard waste. This form should be submitted 24 hours prior to arrival.

== See also ==
- MARPOL 73/78 – International marine environmental convention
- Marpol Annex I – 1983 convention on ocean pollution
- Oil Content Meter – Device for monitoring oil levels in shipboard water discharges
- Oil Record Book – Records all oil and fuel movements within a ship
- Oily water separator – Marine piece of equipment that separates oil and water mixtures
- Oily water separator (marine) – Marine piece of equipment that separates oil and water mixtures
- Magic pipe – Trick in a ship's waste-handling equipment to circumvent pollution regulations
- IMO – Specialized agency of the United Nations
- Oil discharge monitoring equipment
