= Florentine flask =

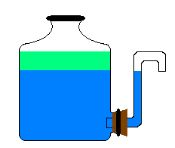
Florentine flask; separate and water layers are shown in green and blue respectively

A Florentine flask, also known as a Florentine receiver, Florentine separator or essencier (from the French), with other shapes called Florentine vase or Florentine vessel, is an oil–water separator fed with condensed vapors of a steam distillation in a fragrance extraction process.

== Usage ==
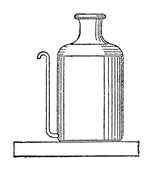
Florentine flask

When the raw material is heated with steam from boiling water, volatile fragrant compounds and steam leave the still. The vapours are cooled in the condenser and become liquid. The liquid runs into the florentine receiver where the water and essential oil phases separate. The essential oils phase separates from water (or the aqueous phase) because the oils have a different density than water and are not water-soluble.

There are florentines that are able to accommodate oils that are either denser or less dense than water. One type separates essential oils of lower density than water, for example lavender oil, accumulating in a layer floating on the water; this kind of florentine has to be airtight to reduce the loss of volatile substances. The other type is intended for oils that are denser than water, where the oil accumulates beneath the water phase, for instance cinnamon, wintergreen, vetiver, patchouli or cloves; the floating water phase prevents the loss of volatile compounds from the oil.

The separated water is a herbal distillate and can be fed back into the still or may in some cases be sold as herbal water. As small droplets of oil are entrained with the water flowing out of the florentine, the yield can sometimes be increased by using more than one florentine in series.

For laboratory use, a small glass florentine without a base is called a florentine vase, as it has a slight resemblance to a small amphora. Larger glass receivers with base are called florentine flasks or essenciers.

Glass is normally only used up to 15 liter vessels; above this size, glass is too fragile, so that metal is used for larger capacities.

== See also ==
- Separatory funnel
