= Oil content meter =

Device for monitoring oil levels in shipboard water discharges

An oil content meter (OCM) is an integral part of all oily water separator (OWS) systems. Oil content meters are also sometimes referred to as oil content monitors, bilge alarms, or bilge monitors.

== OCM technology ==
The OCM continuously monitors how much oil is in the water that is pumped out the discharge line of the OWS system. The OCM will not allow the oil concentration of the exiting water to be above the Marpol standard of 15 ppm. This standard was first adopted in 1977 with Resolution A.393(X) which was published by IMO. These standards were updated various but the most current resolution is MEPC 108(49). The oil content meter will sound an alarm if the liquid leaving the system has an unsatisfactory amount of oil in the mixture. If it is still above that standard, then the bilge water will be reentered into the system until it meets the required criteria. The OCM uses light beams to determine how oily the water in the system is. The system will then gauge the oil concentration based on a light intensity meter. Modern oil content meters also have a data logging system that can store oil concentration measurements for more than 18 months.

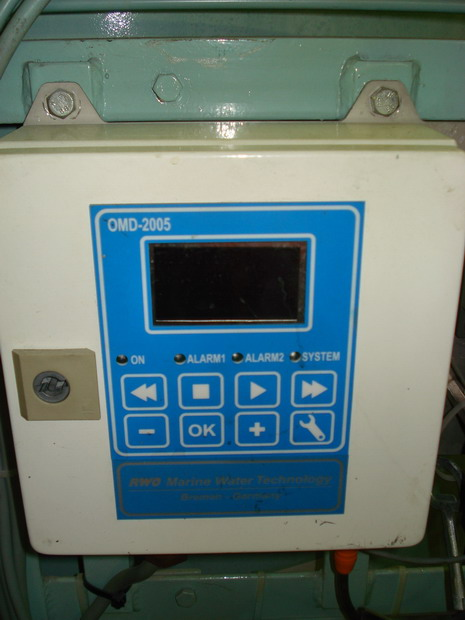
Oil content meter

If the OCM determines that there is far too much of a type of oil, the OCM may be fouled and needs to be flushed out. Running clean water through the OCM sensor cell is one way it can be cleaned. Also scrubbing the sensor area with a bottle brush is another effective method. The new MEPC 107(49) regulations have set out stringent actions that require the OCM to be tamper proof and also the OCM needs to have an alarm that sounds whenever the OCM is being cleaned. When the alarm goes off, the OCM functionality will be checked by crew members.

An OCM is a small part of what is called the oil discharge monitoring and control system. The first part is the oil content meter. The second is a flow meter which measures the flow rate of the water at the discharge pipe. Third, is a computing unit which calculates how much oil has actually been discharged along with the day and time of the discharge. And lastly is the overboard valve control system which is essentially just a valve that can stop the discharge from flowing out at the appropriate time.

Oil content meters measure how effective the oily water separators on a ship are functioning. If the OCM computes that the oily discharge is above the 15 ppm standard, the oily water separator needs to be checked by the crew.

There are three types of oil that the oil content meter needs to check for and they are fuel oil, diesel, and emulsions.

== See also ==
- Marpol Annex I – 1983 convention on ocean pollution
- Magic pipe – Trick in a ship's waste-handling equipment to circumvent pollution regulations
- Port reception facilities
- MARPOL 73/78 – International marine environmental convention
- International Maritime Organization – Specialized agency of the United Nations
