= Maritime environmental crime =

Maritime actions that negatively impact the environment

Environmental maritime crime constitutes one of the key components of the broader domain of blue crime, and it describes and includes activities that detrimentally impact the marine environment. Its effects have had extremely deleterious impacts on marine life, both in terms of affecting marine ecosystems and the life quality of coastal citizens, with damages that are often not reparable.

== Overview ==
Environmental maritime crimes include activities such as illegal and unregulated fishing, fuel dumping, the discharge of residues, garbage, and sewages. These actions have had devastating effects on the marine environment, with for example the loss of biodiversity and the destruction of coral reefs. It is a category of maritime security of key importance, as it endangers not only the ecosystem, but the millions of activities and lives that relate to it, with an estimated 40 million people being involved in the maritime domain. Because of their ruinous effects on the environment, these crimes also weigh importantly on climate change, contributing to its quick advancements and future impact.

Environmental maritime crimes are committed at sea with the intent of avoiding regulations and extra fees, meaning that criminals can have important financial gains by bypassing legal protocols. As an example, dumping fuel instead of going through the designated legal processes can save companies from 80 to 220.000 dollars. Contrary to popular belief, these harmful actions are often carried out by major corporate companies and organized groups, challenging the prevailing assumption that smaller actors are responsible for the majority of environmental crimes at sea.

Maritime environmental crimes have the characteristics of affecting people across borders, which means that robust international cooperation and coordination are necessary to effectively address and mitigate their adverse effects. These illicit activities often intertwine with a range of other unlawful practices, spanning from smuggling to tax evasion, extending their consequences beyond maritime boundaries into broader territorial realms.

One of the most relevant challenges in addressing environmental maritime crime is identifying and apprehending the offender. Even when perpetrators are brought to justice, the effectiveness of deterrent measures is often compromised by lenient penalties that prioritize financial compensation, in the form of fines, over preventing future violations. This means that there is an urgent need for more rigorous regulatory frameworks and enforcement mechanisms to adequately suppress environmental wrongdoings.

Despite the relevance of the issue and the stakes it presents, there remains a significant gap in the monitoring and reporting of maritime environmental crimes by many countries, including several developed nations. The lack of regular tracking and public reporting hampers efforts to combat these crimes effectively on a global scale, underscoring the need for increased collaboration and transparency among nations to protect marine ecosystems and biodiversity.

== Definitions ==
A universally institutionalized definition of environmental crime has not been established, and neither scholars nor International Organizations have so far been able to come up with a fully inclusive and widely accepted definition. Despite this, consensus has been reached on a set of fundamental criteria and factors that define the criminal activities. These include violations of environmental regulations, meaning that the actions can be treated as offenses and prosecuted legally; the involvement of major criminal enterprises is also of key importance, as well as the consequences of the actions, hence alterations of maritime wildlife, including both flora and fauna, and the impact of the adjacent contexts. These factors provide a robust foundation for gaining a basic understanding of the term, and are extremely important for policy formulation.

== Cases of environmental crimes ==
Environmental crime includes a variety of illegal activities that damage the environment in different ways, as shown by documented cases.

=== Environmental crimes associated with the Russian shadow fleet ===
Academic and policy-oriented literature on shadow fleets identifies environmental risk as a significant concern alongside issues of sanctions enforcement, maritime security, and economic regulation. This risk is particularly associated with the transport of Russian oil following the international sanctions imposed after 2022. While much of the literature focuses on sanctions compliance and security implications, several studies note that practices used to evade regulatory oversight also undermine environmental protection and accountability mechanisms at sea.

The literature links the operations of the Russian shadow fleet to environmental harm through the systematic circumvention of international regulatory, safety, and liability regimes. In this context, Russian shadow fleet activity is described as generating foreseeable environmental risks and weakening established frameworks for marine environmental protection.

Environmental risks are primarily associated with operational characteristics commonly attributed to shadow fleet activity. These include the use of ageing and poorly maintained oil tankers, frequently operating with limited, unclear, or inadequate insurance coverage. Such vessels are reported to avoid port state control inspections and other international safety regimes, reducing the effectiveness of systems intended to prevent and respond to marine pollution incidents.

Reduced transparency in vessel movements and ownership is also widely documented. Studies describe practices such as the disabling of automatic identification system (AIS) transponders, the use of opaque ownership structures, and frequent changes of flag state intended to obscure responsibility and complicate enforcement jurisdiction. According to the literature, these practices increase the risk of maritime collisions and hinder the detection, attribution, and remediation of pollution events.

Ship-to-ship oil transfers conducted under reduced oversight are identified as an additional source of environmental risk, particularly when carried out with AIS signals disabled and limited regulatory supervision. The prevalence of substandard, uninsured, or underinsured tankers is further noted to undermine international liability and compensation frameworks, reducing the effectiveness of conventions designed to ensure timely remediation following marine pollution incidents.

== Addressing maritime eco-crime: regulatory environment ==
Because of the nature of maritime environmental crimes, which go beyond borders and might lead to having the effects of an accident felt all over the globe, international actions aimed at restoring the damages, while also making sure that crimes are prosecuted and repetition is avoided, are necessary. Because of these reasons, the main International Organizations have all come up with initiatives.

=== European Union policies ===
The European Union has a key role in combating environmental maritime crimes, because it ranks as the first trading power in the world, and much of the trade is conducted via sea, meaning that ocean health is crucial to the EU's economic and social advancements. The Organization is also composed by countries with the highest number of fleets globally, with Greece being first worldwide, and Norway and Denmark ranking high as well.

One of the most relevant EU policies is the European Union Maritime Security Strategy (EUMSS), which first came into action in 2014, but has already undergone several revisions. The 2023 and latest revisions aimed to target newly emerged threats and propose strategic plans for possible resolutions; in the publication, climate change and marine pollution are identified as crucial evolving threats to maritime security. According to council conclusions (14280/23 2023), these environmental challenges are important and enduring, including "biodiversity loss, depletion of fish stocks, coastal inundation, and the degradation of critical ecosystems such as coral reefs and mangroves".

Therefore, the EU has come up with a large number of policies and initiatives; some of the latest policies are directed to the protection of the marine flora and fauna from degradation and exploitation emerging as a central concern, which pushes Member States to take proactive measures and relief strategies on such issues. Notably, the EU has introduced the "biodiversity strategy for 2030" as a cornerstone of the European Green Deal, which includes legally binding actions for Member States. These actions encompass the establishment of protected areas covering at least 30% of the EU's sea surface, alongside a substantial annual funding allocation of 20 billion Euros.

Additionally, efforts to address biodiversity loss include the "nature restoration law", mandating the implementation of recovery measures covering a minimum of a fifth of the EU's marine territories by 2030. The EU assumes a central international role by monitoring Member States' progress towards the set objectives and actively participating in multilateral conventions, such as the 2022 United Nations Biodiversity Conference (COP15). These engagements have contributed to the formulation of a post-2020 global framework aimed at guiding global actions to protect and restore natural resources by 2030 and beyond.

The centrality of maritime environmental security in the EU is also demonstrated by looking at their "climate neutrality by 2050" policy, which underlines the need to maintain clean bodies of water as a prerequisite for success. The EU is also actively developing tools to support these efforts, including technologies for early warning and strategic foresight, as well as mechanisms for monitoring ocean elevation, degradation, keeping track of oil spills and attributing responsibility, such as the CleanSeaNet satellites.

The centrality of maritime environment protection for the benefit of maritime security as a whole can also be discerned from further directives developed by the EU. An example is the 2008 directive "on the protection of the environment through criminal law", which ordered Member States to establish legal frameworks to prosecute maritime environmental offenses. Subsequent amendments, such as in 2009, focused on the regulation of ship-source pollution levels and introducing penalties for violations. A revolutionary vote was reached in February 2024, when the European Parliament voted to pass a policy that calls for establishing criminal charges for companies responsible for the extended destruction of biodiversity, with the executives being eligible for long periods of prison time.

Moreover, the EU has recently implemented regulations that target the shipping industry set by organizations such as the UN though the MARPOL convention. These regulations impose stricter penalties and open up the scope of punishable offenses to include illegal discharges of harmful substances, garbage and residues. Through these various efforts, the EU is attempting to reinforce its commitment to safeguarding marine ecosystems and promoting sustainable maritime practices.

=== United Nations policies ===
The United Nations (UN) has been at the forefront of global efforts to combat maritime environmental crime, recognizing the critical importance of protecting and preserving the marine environment. Key initiatives stem from instruments such as the United Nations Convention on the Law of the Sea (UNCLOS) and the International Convention for the Prevention of Pollution from Ships (MARPOL 73/78), developed in response to major incidents of ship-source pollution. MARPOL is responsible for the key legislation known as the Act to Prevent Pollution from Ships (APPS), which enforces the regulations outlined in MARPOL. Under APPS, it is considered an offense to knowingly breach specific provisions of MARPOL, APPS itself, and other pertinent pollution statutes. Additionally, the Organization took upon itself the responsibility to organize various conferences and events open to all Members to spread information about the issue at stake, with examples such as the UN Oceans Conference, held for the first time in 2017, and repeated in 2022, which mobilized action to address issues like IUU fishing, marine degradation, and water contamination. The Organization also attempts to tackle the loss of marine flora and fauna, with meetings and conferences such as the 2022 United Nations Biodiversity Conference, which was successful in organizing planned actions and assigning budget for the tackling of the security threat.

The UN is also responsible for setting up the International Maritime Organization (IMO), which is now considered the specialist organization that is responsible for maintaining good safety and quality standards at sea, for what concerns both commercial operations and green initiatives. The IMO is an extremely important agency to mention when analyzing maritime environmental crime, as it not only implemented the MARPOL initiative, but it is also the actor that came up with other key conventions and agreements concerning legal frameworks on insurance and post-incident environmental reparations; some of its key initiatives widely ratified by States are the "civil liability for pollution damage", firstly adopted in 1969 but then revised, which establishes standards for economic remuneration in the event of an accident that caused marine pollution, and the processes to follow in such an event. Similarly, the International Convention on "Civil liability for Bunker Oil Pollution Damage" (BUNKER) assigns frameworks for setting up reparation in the event of an oil spill.

=== Other international efforts ===
International initiatives for addressing maritime environmental crime that originate from outside of the main International Organizations have gained momentum in recent years, spurred by the efforts of various non-governmental organizations (NGOs) such as Global Fishing Watch and the International Tanker Owners Pollution Federation. These organizations play a crucial role in monitoring and reporting incidents of environmental violations at sea. International efforts to combat maritime environmental crime have been further bolstered by initiatives such as INTERPOL's Operation 30 Days at Sea, first launched in 2018. These operations focus on increasing the reviewing of ships with a specific emphasis on illegal pollution activities. During the first 30 Days at Sea operation in 2018, agents from around the world detected over 500 crimes, primarily related to illegal oil and garbage disposal, leading to hundreds of investigations. Additionally, environmental obligations stem from various international conventions and multilateral environmental agreements (MEAs) enacted since the Second World War. Many of these agreements are in force within the territories of European Union Member States. Despite the richness of this body of international environmental protection principles, it often faces fragmentation and overlaps, highlighting the ongoing challenge of coordinating global efforts to safeguard marine ecosystems.

== Criticisms ==
International policies on maritime environmental crimes have been criticized often, mostly because of the significant shortcomings in current approaches, especially within the European Union and the United Nations. Despite the numerous initiatives proposed by the EU, experts have pointed out the Organization's ineffectiveness in prosecuting unlawful behaviors that contribute to maritime environmental erosion. This ineffectiveness grows from a lack of legal coherence, the judicial system being complex, failures to harmonize laws and establish a common definition of maritime eco-crimes and their respective penalties. Critics underline the urgent need for internationally recognized definitions and appropriate prosecutions, to ensure adequate punishment for crimes with long-lasting environmental consequences. Critics also highlight shortcomings in current regulations that govern ship pollution and fuel directives, in terms of low compliance by states and the non-binding nature of regulations. They advocate for immediate action to integrate such measures into International Law, to ensure compliance and address these systemic flaws effectively.
