= Oily water separator (marine) =

Equipment to separate oil and water mixtures

An oily water separator (OWS) (marine) is a piece of equipment specific to the shipping or marine industry. It is used to separate oil and water mixtures into their separate components. This page refers exclusively to oily water separators aboard marine vessels. They are found on board ships where they are used to separate oil from oily waste water such as bilge water before the waste water is discharged into the environment. These discharges of waste water must comply with the requirements laid out in Marpol 73/78.

Bilge water is a byproduct of shipboard operations. Oil leaks from running machinery such as diesel generators, air compressors, and the main propulsion engine. Modern OWSs have alarms and automatic closure devices which are activated when the oil storage content of the waste water exceeds a certain limit (15 ppm: 15 cm3 of oil in 1m3 of water).

== Purpose ==
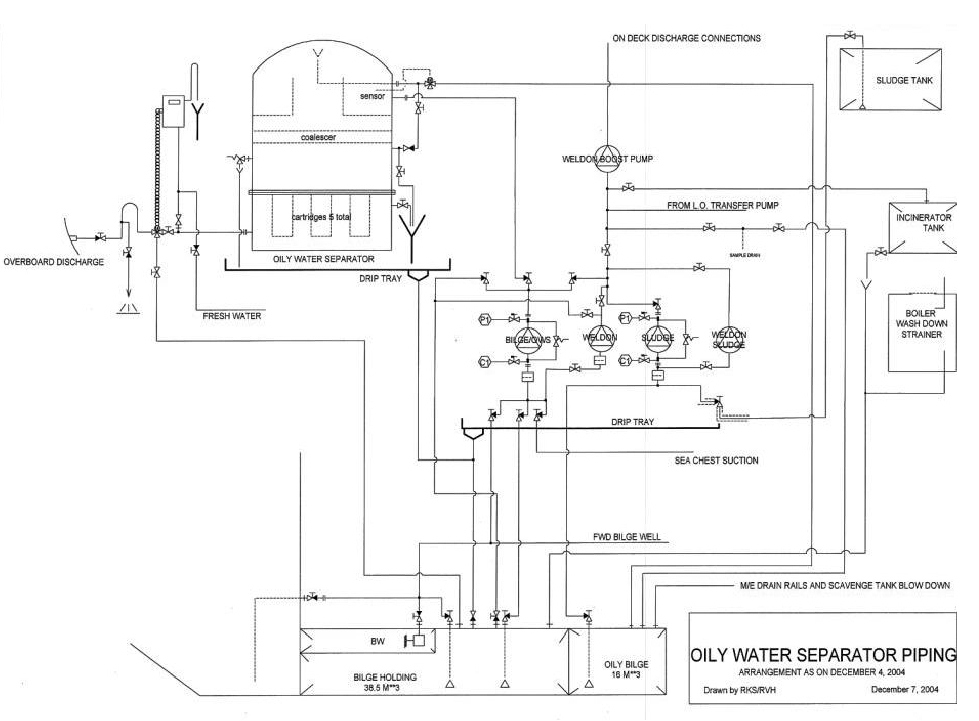
Oily water separator piping diagram

The primary purpose of a shipboard oily water separator (OWS) is to separate oil and other contaminants that could be harmful for the oceans. The International Maritime Organization (IMO) publishes regulations through the Marine Environment Protection Committee (MEPC). On July 18, 2003, the MEPC issued new regulations that each vessel built after this date had to follow. This document is known as MEPC 107(49) and it details revised guidelines and specifications for pollution prevention equipment for machinery space bilges of ships. Each OWS must be able to achieve clean bilge water under 15 ppm of type C oil or heavily emulsified oil, and any other contaminants that may be found. All oil content monitors (OCM) must be tamper-proof. Also, whenever the OWS is being cleaned out, the OCM must be active. An OWS must be able to clear out contaminants as well as oil. Some of these contaminating agents include lubricating oil, cleaning product, soot from combustion, fuel oil, rust, sewage, and several other things that can be harmful to the ocean environment.

== Bilge content ==
The bilge area is the lowest area on a ship. The bilge water that collects here include drain water or leftover water from the boilers, water collecting tanks, drinking water and other places where water cannot overflow. However, bilge water doesn't just include water drainage. Another system that drains into the bilge system comes from the propulsion area of the ship. Here fuels, lubricants, hydraulic fluid, antifreeze, solvents, and cleaning chemicals drain into the engine room bilges in small quantities. The OWS is intended to remove a large proportion of these contaminants before discharge to the environment (overboard to the sea).

== Design and operation ==
All OWS equipment, new or old, can, in a laboratory setting, automatically separate oil and water to produce clean water for discharge overboard that contains no more than 15 parts per million oil. OWS equipment is approved by testing it with specific mixtures of mixed oil and water. Initially these combinations were very simple, almost no more than a mixture of clean water and diesel fuel, but they have become more sophisticated under MARPOL MEPC 107(49). The vast majority of these many equipment models, manufacturers, and types start with some sort of gravity separation of bilge water. Simply letting oil and water sit is called decanting, but this does not always meet the 15 ppm criterion, which is why each manufacturer has added additional features to his equipment to ensure that this criterion can be met. The separation that takes place inside the OWS allows oil that floats to the top to be automatically skimmed off to a sludge tank or dirty oil holding tank. There is no official standard for tank naming convention but proposals do exist.

An OWS needs to be fitted with an oil content meter (OCM) that samples the OWS overboard discharge water for oil content. If the oil content is less than 15 ppm, the OCM allows the water to be discharged overboard. If the oil content is higher than 15 ppm, the OCM will activate an alarm and move a three-way valve that, within a short period of time, will recirculate the overboard discharge water to a tank on the OWS suction side.

An OCM takes a trickle sample from the OWS overboard discharge line and shines a light through the sample to an optical sensor. Since small oil droplets will diffract and diffuse light, and a change in signal at the sensor will indicate the presence of oil. At a certain signal setting that is roughly equivalent to 15 ppm, the sensor will conclude that there is too much oil going through the discharge line. This calibration generally takes place in a lab, but can be tested by use of a three-sample liquid aboard the vessel. If the OCM ends up sampling a certain amount of heavy oil, the OCM will be fouled and it will need to be flushed or cleaned.

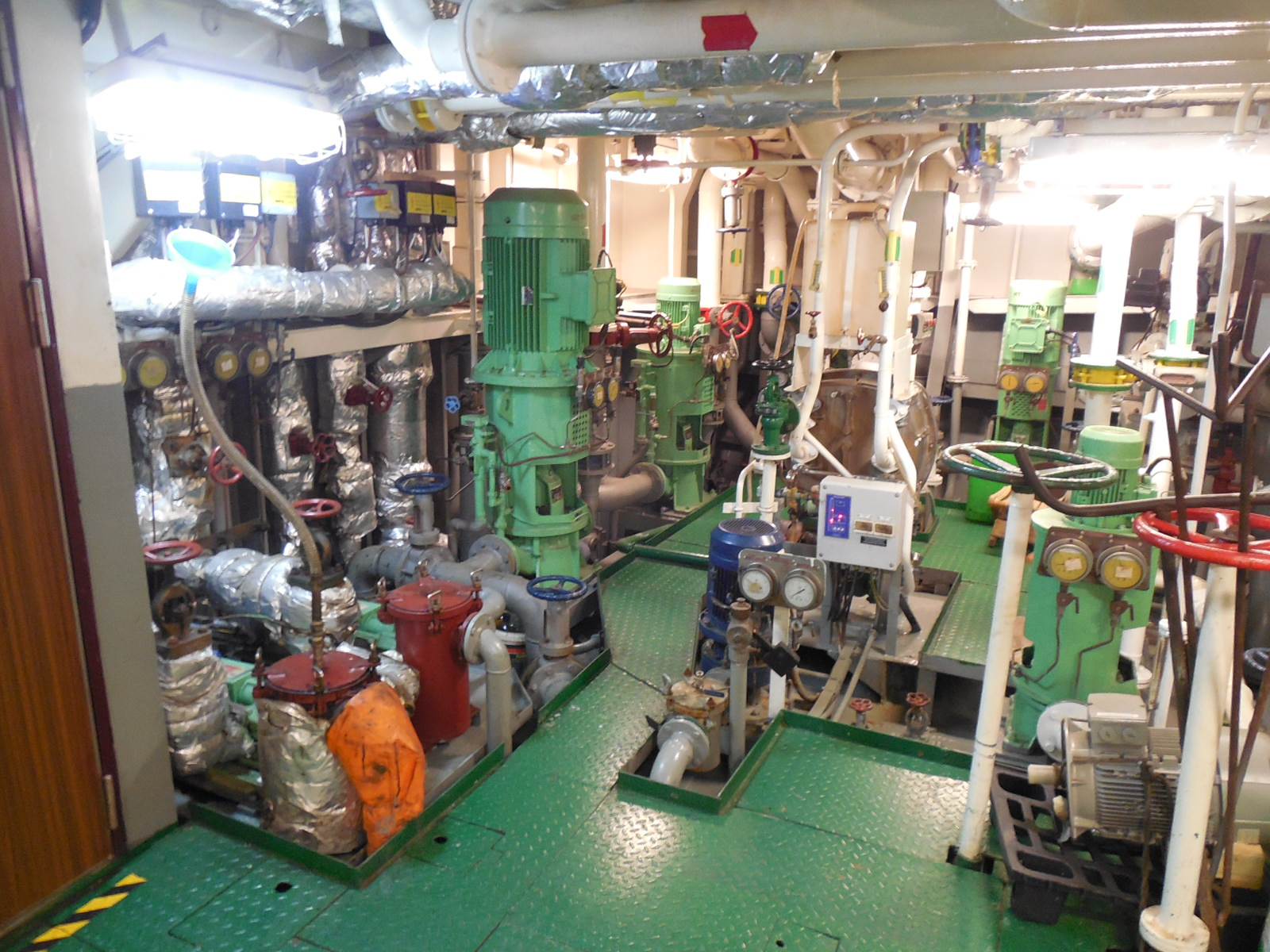
Shipboard engine room

The cleaning can be done by running fresh water through the OCM via a permanent connection or can be performed by opening the OCM sample area and scrubbing the sample area with a bottle brush.

The water removed by the OWS flows to oil collecting spaces. There can be two stages. The first-stage filter removes physical impurities present and promotes some fine separation. The second-stage filter uses coalescer inserts to achieve the final de-oiling. Coalescence is the breakdown of surface tension between oil droplets in an oil/water mixture which causes them to join and increase in size. The oil from the collecting spaces is drained away automatically or manually. In most modern ships, the oil from collecting spaces is drained away automatically.

== Oil record book ==
All Cargo vessels where MARPOL Convention is applicable must have an oil record book where the chief engineer will record all oil or sludge transfers and discharges within the vessel. This is necessary in order for authorities to be able to monitor if a vessel's crew has performed any illegal oil discharges at sea.

When making entries in the oil record book Part I, the date, operational code, and item number are inserted in the appropriate columns and the required particulars shall be recorded in chronological order as they have been executed on board. Each operation is to be fully recorded without delay so that all the entries in the book appropriate to that operation are completed.

== History of regulations for treated water discharge ==
In 1948 in the US, a Water Pollution Control Act (WPA) was passed by the federal government. This act gave rights to the surgeon general of the public health service to make programs to decrease the amount of pollution in the world's waters. The main concern was to save water, protect fish, and have clean water for agricultural usage. The WPA also helped to start the process of building water treatment plants. This is to guard against sewage from polluting drinking water. In 1972 the WPA was amended to include more requirements in order to insure that the water is chemically sound. This amendment also furthered regulations to insure the quality of the water was up to par. In 1987 the WPA was amended again to put an even more strict control on water supply pollution. With this new amendment water sources had to fit a specific set of criteria to fight against pollution.

=== MARPOL ===
Marpol 73/78 is the International Convention for the Prevention of Pollution from Ships, 1973 as modified by the Protocol of 1978. ("Marpol" is short for marine pollution and 73/78 short for the years 1973 and 1978.)

Marpol 73/78 is one of the most important international marine environmental conventions. It was designed to minimize pollution of the seas, including dumping, oil and exhaust pollution. Its stated objective is to preserve the marine environment through the complete elimination of pollution by oil and other harmful substances and the minimization of accidental discharge of such substances.

== Current regulations ==
=== United States ===
The regulations in the Clean Water Act limit what may be discharged to sea from an OWS in USA waters. Current limits are < 15 mg/L oil for discharges within 12 nautical miles of shore or 100 mg/L outside that limit.

=== Europe and Canada ===
European countries and Canada have stricter rules on discharge and discharges must contain less than 5 mg/L of contaminants.

The discharge of oil contaminated waters are also subject to international controls such as the International Convention for the Prevention of Pollution from Ships (MARPOL), and International Maritime Organization (IMO). These organizations set strict limits to protect marine life and coastal environments. These agencies require logs to be kept of any discharges of contaminated water.

== Types ==
=== Gravity plate separator ===
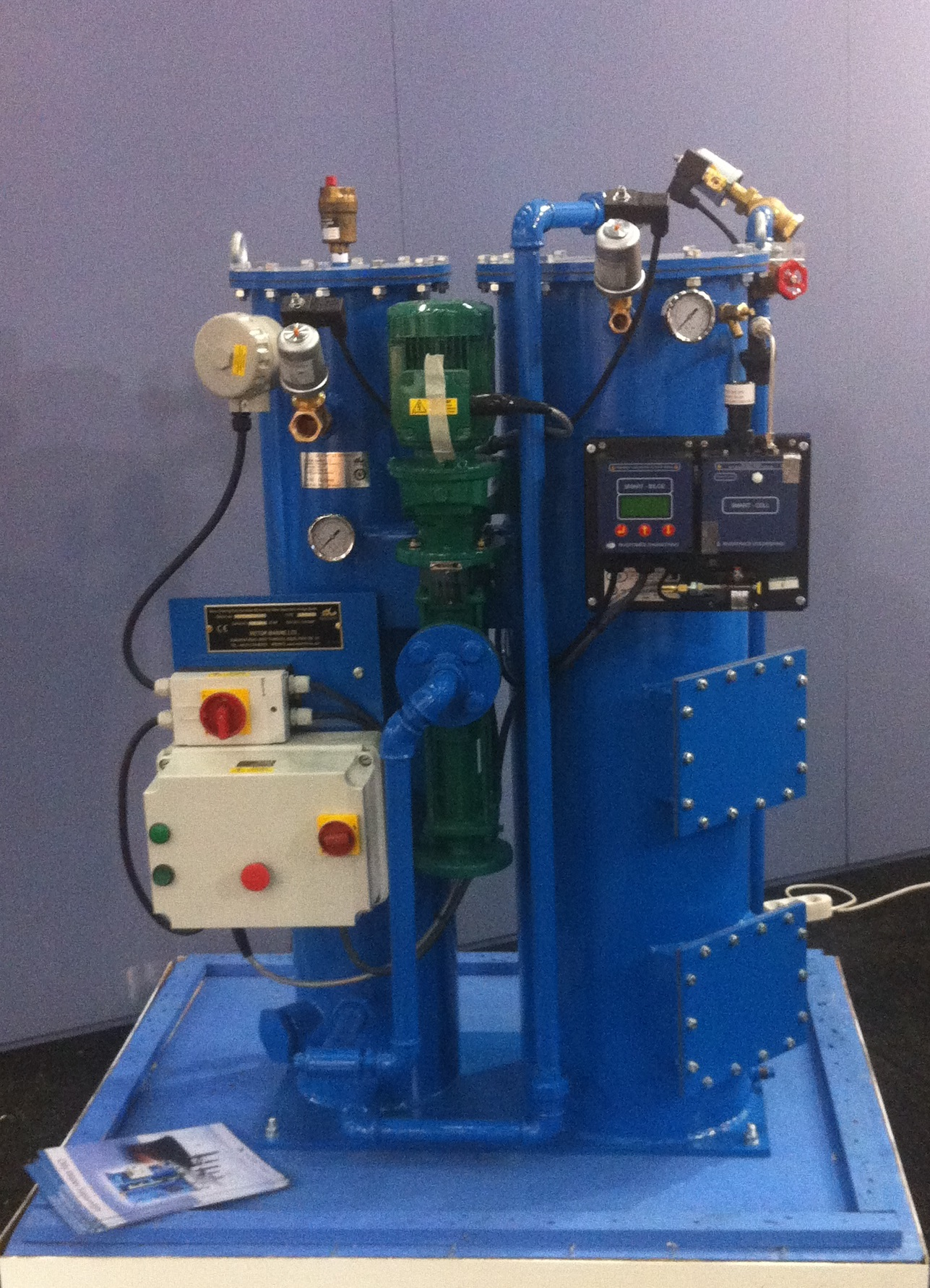
Marine Oily water separator

A gravity plate separator contains a series of oleophilic plates through which the contaminated water flows. The oil in the water coalesces on the underside of the plate eventually forming droplets before coalescing into liquid oil which floats off the plates and accumulates at the top of the chamber. The oil accumulating at the top is then transferred to waste oil tank on the vessel where it is later discharged to a treatment facility ashore. This type of Oily Water Separator is common in ships, but it has flaws that decrease efficiency. Oil particles that are twenty micrometers or smaller are not separated. The variety of oily wastes in bilge water can limit removal efficiency especially when very dense and highly viscous oils such as bunker oil are present. Plates must be replaced when fouled, which increases the costs of operation.

=== Electrochemical ===
Wastewater purification of oils and contaminants by electrochemical emulsification is actively in research and development. Electrochemical emulsification involves the generation of electrolytic bubbles that attract pollutants such as sludge and carry them to the top of the treatment chamber. Once at the top of the treatment chamber the oil and other pollutants are transferred to a waste oil tank.

=== Bioremediation ===
Bioremediation is the use of microorganisms to treat contaminated water. A carefully managed environment is needed for the microorganisms which includes nutrients and hydrocarbons such as oil or other contaminants, and oxygen.

In pilot scale studies, bio-remediation was used as one stage in a multi-stage purification process involving a plate separator to remove the majority of the contaminants and was able to treat pollutants at very low concentrations including organic contaminants such as glycerol, solvents, jet fuel, detergents, and phosphates. After treatment of contaminated water, carbon dioxide, water and an organic sludge were the only residual products.

=== Centrifugal ===
A centrifugal water-oil separator, centrifugal oil-water separator or centrifugal liquid-liquid separator is a device designed to separate oil and water by centrifugation. It generally contains a cylindrical container that rotates inside a larger stationary container. The denser liquid, usually water, accumulates at the periphery of the rotating container and is collected from the side of the device, whereas the less dense liquid, usually oil, accumulates at the rotation axis and is collected from the center. Centrifugal oil-water separators are used for waste water processing and for cleanup of oil spills on sea or on lake. Centrifugal oil-water separators are also used for filtering diesel and lubricating oils by removing the waste particles and impurity from them.

== Problems ==
On a properly operated vessel only small amounts of bilge would be present as long as there are no equipment failures. But even the best-operated vessels suffer equipment failures, which then quickly results in contaminated bilges. Sometimes these contaminants are massive and pose a serious challenge to the crew to deal with in a legal fashion.

An ideal OWS system will make it clear and easy for regulatory enforcement agencies to determine if OWS system regulations are being violated. At present, there is no clear and efficient method of determining whether regulations are violated or not. At the most basic level, the absolute absence of any type of standardization of OWS systems makes the initial investigation confusing, dirty, time-consuming and sometimes plain incorrect. In the marine industry there is a long-standing and important tradition of "jointness" in marine forensic investigations, where all parties at interest examine the same things at the same time. However, due to the criminal character of OWS violations the jointness concept is abandoned, which leads to very poor technical investigative methods and severe unnecessary disruptions to vessel operations.

Various efforts are being made to improve the overall OWS system approach. In 2015, at the MAX1 Studies Conference held in Wilmington, North Carolina, maritime leaders from many different sectors gathered to discuss problems potential solutions regarding waste stream management.

== See also ==
- API oil-water separator
- Wastewater treatment plant
- Magic pipe
- Oily water separators
- Oil content meter
- Marpol Annex I
- Marpol 73/78
- Oil discharge monitoring equipment
- Port Reception Facilities
