= MARPOL 73/78 =

International marine environmental convention

International Convention for the Prevention of Pollution from Ships, 1973 as modified by the Protocol of 1978
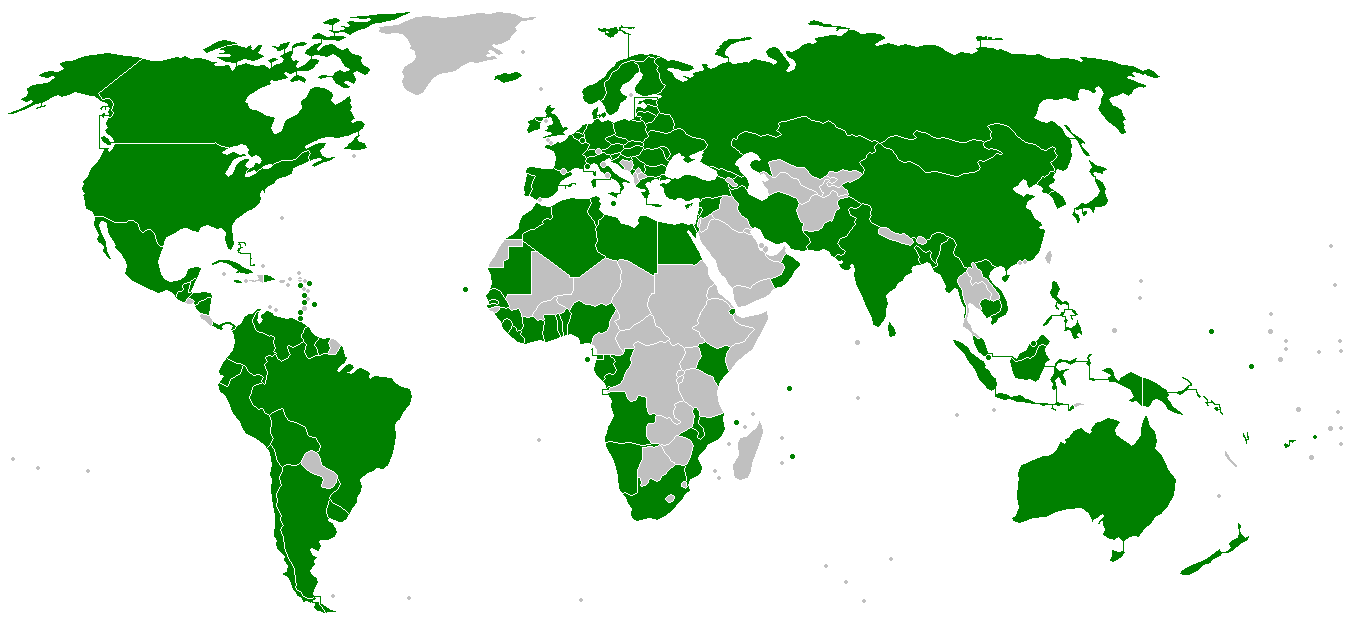
- MARPOL 73/78 ratifying states (as of April 2008)
- Effective: 2 October 1983
- Parties: 158

The International Convention for the Prevention of Pollution from Ships, 1973 as modified by the Protocol of 1978, or "MARPOL 73/78" (short for "marine pollution") is one of the most important international marine environmental conventions. It was developed by the International Maritime Organization with an objective to minimize pollution of the oceans and seas, including dumping, oil and air pollution.

The original MARPOL was signed on 17 February 1973, but did not come into force at the signing date. The current convention is a combination of 1973 Convention and the 1978 Protocol, which entered into force on 2 October 1983. As of January 2018, 156 states are parties to the convention, being flag states of 99.42% of the world's shipping tonnage.

All ships flagged under countries that are signatories to MARPOL are subject to its requirements, regardless of where they sail, and member nations are responsible for vessels registered on their national ship registry.

== Provisions ==
MARPOL is divided into Annexes according to various categories of pollutants, each of which deals with the regulation of a particular group of ship emissions.

List of the MARPOL 73/78 Annexes
Annex	Title	Entry into force	No. of contracting parties/states^{α}	% of world tonnage^{β}
Annex I	Prevention of pollution by oil & oily water	2 October 1983		
Annex II	Control of pollution by noxious liquid substances in bulk	6 April 1987		
Annex III	Prevention of pollution by harmful substances carried by sea in packaged form	1 July 1992	138	97.59
Annex IV	Pollution by sewage from ships	27 September 2003		
Annex V	Pollution by garbage from ships	31 December 1988		
Annex VI	Prevention of air pollution from ships	19 May 2005	72	94.70
Notes^α As of 31 July 2013^β Based on World Fleet Statistics as of 31 December 2012

=== Annex I ===
MARPOL Annex I came into force on 2 October 1983 and deals with the discharge of oil into the ocean environment. It incorporates the oil discharge criteria prescribed in the 1969 amendments to the 1954 International Convention for the Prevention of Pollution of the Sea by Oil (OILPOL). It specifies tanker design features that are intended to minimize oil discharge into the ocean during ship operations and in case of accidents. It provides regulations with regard to the treatment of engine room bilge water (OWS) for all large commercial vessels and ballast and tank cleaning waste (ODME). It also introduces the concept of "special sea areas (PPSE)", which are considered to be at risk to pollution by oil. Discharge of oil within them has been completely outlawed, with a few minimal exceptions.

The first half of MARPOL Annex I deals with engine room waste. There are various generations of technologies and equipment that have been developed to prevent waste such as oily water separators (OWS), oil content meters (OCM), and port reception facilities.

The second part of the MARPOL Annex I has more to do with cleaning the cargo areas and tanks. Oil discharge monitoring equipment (ODME) is a very important technology mentioned in MARPOL Annex I that has greatly helped improve sanitation in these areas.

The oil record book is another integral part of MARPOL Annex I, helping crew members log and keep track of oily wastewater discharges, among other things.

=== Annex II ===
MARPOL Annex II came into force on 6 April 1987. It details the discharge criteria for the elimination of pollution by noxious liquid substances carried in large quantities. It divides substances into and introduces detailed operational standards and measures. The discharge of pollutants is allowed only to reception facilities with certain concentrations and conditions. No matter what, no discharge of residues containing pollutants is permitted within 12 nautical miles (22 kilometres) of the nearest land. Stricter restrictions apply to "special areas".

Annex II covers the International Bulk Chemical Code (IBC Code) in conjunction with Chapter 7 of the SOLAS Convention. Previously, chemical tankers constructed before 1 July 1986 must comply with the requirements of the Code for the Construction and Equipment of Ships Carrying Dangerous Chemicals in Bulk (BCH Code).

=== Annex III ===
MARPOL Annex III came into force on 1 July 1992. It contains general requirements for the standards on packing, marking, labeling, documentation, stowage, quantity subtraction, division and notifications for preventing pollution by harmful substances. The Annex is in line with the procedures detailed in the International Maritime Dangerous Goods (IMDG) Code, which has been expanded to include marine pollutants. The amendments entered into force on 1 January 1991.

=== Annex IV ===
Marpol Annex IV came into force on 27 September 2003. It introduces requirements to control pollution of the sea by sewage from ships.

=== Annex V ===
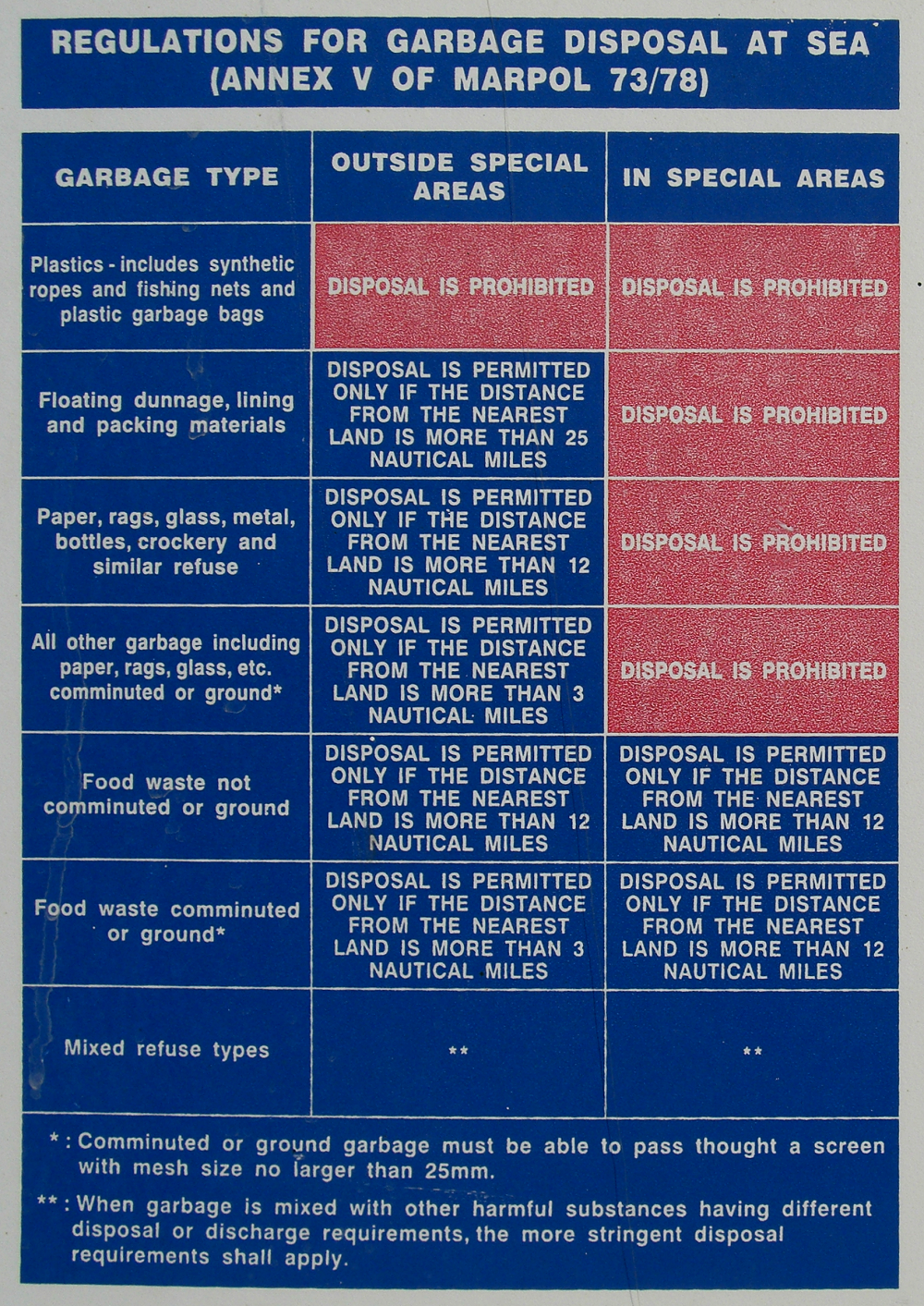
MARPOL 73-78 Instructions

MARPOL Annex V (Regulations for the Prevention of Pollution by Garbage from Ships) came into force on 31 December 1988. It specifies the distances from land in which materials may be disposed of and subdivides different types of garbage and marine debris. The requirements are much stricter in a number of "special areas" but perhaps the most prominent part of the Annex is the complete ban of dumping plastic into the ocean.

=== Annex VI ===
MARPOL Annex VI came into force on 19 May 2005. It introduces requirements to regulate the air pollution being emitted by ships, including the emission of ozone-depleting substances, Nitrogen Oxides (NOx), Sulfur Oxides (SOx), Volatile Organic Compounds (VOCs) and shipboard incineration. It also establishes requirements for reception facilities for wastes from exhaust gas cleaning systems, incinerators, fuel oil quality, off-shore platforms and drilling rigs, and the establishment of Sulfur Emission Control Areas (SECAs).

==== IMO 2020 ====
As of 1 January 2020, new emission standards are enforced for fuel oil used by ships, in a regulation known as IMO 2020. The global sulphur limit (outside SECA's) dropped from an allowed 3.5% sulphur in marine fuels to 0.5%. This will significantly improve the air quality in many populated coastal and port areas, which will prevent over 100,000 early deaths each year, and many more cases of asthma in these regions and cities. Over 170 countries have signed on to the changes, including the United States. This is expected to create massive changes for the shipping and oil industries, with major updates required to ships and the increased production of lower sulfur fuel.

Bunker fuels used within an emission control zone (i.e. North Sea) must have a sulphur content level of less than 0.1% (1000ppm).

The IMO has worked on ensuring consistent implementation of the 0.5% sulphur limit in its Marine Environmental Protection Committee (MEPC) and its subcommittee on Pollution Prevention and Response (PPR). This has led to the development on several regulatory and practical measures (FONAR's, Carriage Ban, Ship Implementation Plan etc.) to enable any non-compliance to be detected, for example during port state controls (PSC's).

== Amendments ==
- MARPOL Annex VI amendments according with MEPC 176(58) came into force 1 July 2010.
- Amended Regulations 12 concerns control and record keeping of Ozone Depleting Substances.
- Amended Regulation 14 concerns mandatory fuel oil change over procedures for vessels entering or leaving SECA areas and FO sulphur limits.
- MARPOL Annex V has been amended multiple times, changing different aspects of the original text.
- MEPC.219(63) came into force on 2 March 2012 to generally prohibit the discharge of any garbage into the ocean, with the exception of food wastes, cargo residues, wash-water, and animal carcasses. There are further provisions describing when and how to dispose of the acceptable wastes.
- MEPC.220(63) came into force on 2 March 2012 to encourage the creation of a waste management plan on-board vessels.

== Implementation and enforcement ==
In order for IMO standards to be binding, they must first be ratified by a total number of member countries whose combined gross tonnage represents at least 50% of the world's gross tonnage, a process that can be lengthy. A system of tacit acceptance has therefore been put into place, whereby, if no objections are heard from a member state after a certain period has elapsed, it is assumed they have assented to the treaty.

All six Annexes have been ratified by the requisite number of nations; the most recent is Annex VI, which took effect in May 2005. The country where a ship is registered (Flag State) is responsible for certifying the ship's compliance with MARPOL's pollution prevention standards. Each signatory nation is responsible for enacting domestic laws to implement the convention and effectively pledges to comply with the convention, annexes, and related laws of other nations. In the United States, for example, the relevant implementation legislation is the Act to Prevent Pollution from Ships.

One of the difficulties in implementing MARPOL arises from the very international nature of maritime shipping. The country that the ship visits can conduct its own examination to verify a ship's compliance with international standards and can detain the ship if it finds significant noncompliance. When incidents occur outside such country's jurisdiction or jurisdiction cannot be determined, the country refers cases to flag states, in accordance with MARPOL. A 2000 US GAO report documented that even when referrals have been made, the response rate from flag states has been poor.

In 1997 the IMO adopted Annex VI establishing global limits on sulphur oxide (SO_{x}) emissions and enabling the designation of Emission Control Areas (ECAs). the ECAs are designated sea regions where ships must meet stricter controls on air pollution under MARPOL Annex VI. Within these areas, vessels are required to use lower‑sulphur fuels or equivalent emission‑reduction technologies, and in some zones comply with enhanced limits on nitrogen oxides. ECAs are established by the International Maritime Organization to reduce the environmental and health impacts of shipping, and currently apply in several coastal regions with high traffic density or sensitive ecosystems. Their requirements are more stringent than the global MARPOL limits and form part of broader international efforts to curb emissions from maritime transport.

In 2006 The Baltic Sea was designated as the first Sulphur Emission Control Area (SECA), reflecting high traffic density and regional environmental sensitivity. The North Sea SECA followed in 2007.

In 2008 the IMO adopted a major Annex VI revision strengthening global and ECA sulphur limits, introducing progressive reductions, and establishing the framework for Nitrogen Emission Control Areas (NECAs).

In 2010 the North American ECA was designated. With the United States and Canada securing approval for a combined SO_{x}/NO_{x} ECA covering their coastal waters.

Next in 2011 the U.S. Caribbean Sea ECA was designated for the waters around Puerto Rico and the U.S. Virgin Islands.

From 2015 0.10% sulphur limit took effect in all ECAs.

Between 2016 and 2021 there was progressive implementation of Tier III NO_{x} limits.

2020 saw the global sulphur cap reduced to 0.50%

The Mediterranean Sea ECA was adopted in 2022, entered into force in 2024, and became fully operational in 2025, imposing a 0.10% sulphur limit across one of the world's busiest semi‑enclosed seas.

== Enforcement of MARPOL Annex VI ==
Concerns have also been raised whether the emission regulation in MARPOL Annex VI, such as the 0.5% global sulphur limit, can be enforced on international waters by non-flag States, as some ships sail under a flag of convenience. It is believed that the United Nations Convention on the Law of the Sea (UNCLOS) allows port States to assert jurisdiction over such violations of emission regulation (also of future regulations of GHG) when they occur on the high seas. Coastal States can assert jurisdiction over violations occurring within their waters, with certain exceptions pertaining to innocent passage and the right of transit passage. The special obligations for flag States and the broadened jurisdictions for coastal and port States, to enforce MARPOL (including Annex VI) are found within the special provisions of part XII of UNCLOS.

== See also ==
- Crude oil washing – Tank-cleaning method using crude oil to remove residues on oil tankers
- International Maritime Organization – Specialized agency of the United Nations
- IMO Net-Zero Framework, a proposed addition to MARPOL Annex VI
- Marine energy management – Practices and systems for reducing energy use and emissions in ship operations
- Marine fuel management – Strategy of fuel management
- Maritime environmental crime – Maritime actions that negatively impact the environment
- Merchant Shipping (Pollution) Act 2006 – Act of the Parliament of the United Kingdom
- Ship pollution – Ocean pollution
- Oil Pollution Act van 1990 – US federal law
- MARPOL Annex I – 1983 convention on ocean pollution
- Oily water separator (marine) – Equipment to separate oil and water mixtures
- Oil content meter – Device for monitoring oil levels in shipboard water discharges
- Port Reception Facilities – Facilities in ports for receiving waste and residues from ships
- Port of Boulogne-sur-Mer – French port
- International Safety Guide for Oil Tankers and Terminals – Code of practice first published in 1978
