= Oil–water separator =

Device to separate oil and water

An oil water separator (OWS) is a piece of equipment used to separate oil and water mixtures into their separate components. There are many different types of oil-water separator. Each has different oil separation capability and are used in different industries. Oil water separators are designed and selected after consideration of oil separation performance parameters and life cycle cost considerations. "Oil" can be taken to mean mineral, vegetable and animal oils, and the many different hydrocarbons.

== Introduction ==
Oil water separators can be designed to treat a variety of contaminants in water including free floating oil, emulsified oil, dissolved oil and suspended solids. Not all oil separator types are capable of separating all contaminants. The most common performance parameters considered are:

- Oil droplet size (in the feed to the separator)
- Oil density
- Water viscosity (temperature)
- Discharge water quality desired
- Feed oil concentration and the range of oil concentrations likely
- Feed oil water flow (daily and peak hourly)

== Florentine flask ==
The Florentine flask, also known as florentine vase, florentine vessel, florentine receiver or essencier is a type of separator to gain essential oils or flavor after a distillation process. The phases of water and oil separate in the florentine because the densities are different and most essential oils are not water-soluble.

== API oil–water separator ==
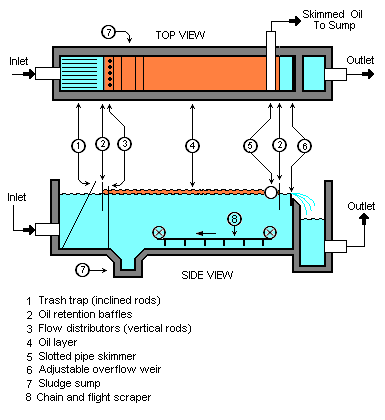
API separator

An API oil–water separator is a device designed to separate gross amounts of oil and suspended solids from the wastewater effluents of oil refineries, petrochemical plants, chemical plants, natural gas processing plants and other industrial sources. The name is derived from the fact that such separators are designed according to API Publication 421, published by the American Petroleum Institute. These separators can be used to separate large oil droplets, typically greater than 150 micron.

== Oily water separator (marine) ==
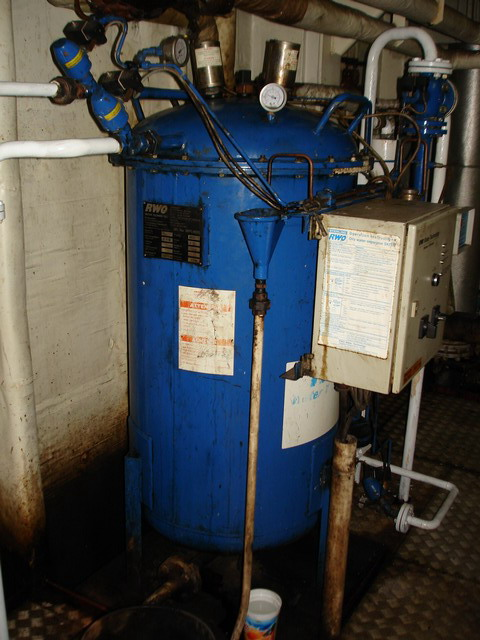
Marine oily water separator

The purpose of a shipboard oily water separator is to separate oil and other contaminants that could be harmful for the oceans. They are most commonly found on board ships where they are used to separate oil from oily waste water such as bilge water before the waste water is discharged into the environment. These discharges of waste water must comply with the requirements laid out in Marpol 73/78.

Bilge water is a near-unavoidable product of shipboard operations. Oil leaks from running machinery, such as diesel generators, air compressors, and the main propulsion engine. Modern OWSs have alarms and automatic closure devices which are activated when the oil storage capacity of the oil water separator has been reached.

== Gravity plate separator ==
A gravity plate separator contains a series of plates through which the contaminated water flows. The objective of the design is to allow oil droplets in the water to coalesce on the underside of the plate eventually forming larger oil droplets which floats off the plates and accumulates at the top of the chamber. The oil accumulating at the top is then transferred with some en-trained water to a waste oil tank. This type of oily water separator is very common for many industrial applications as well as in ships but it has some flaws that decrease efficiency. Oil particles that are sixty micrometers in size or smaller do not get separated. Also the presence of chemicals and surfactants in the water greatly reduce oil droplet coalescence, impeding the separation effect The variety of oily wastes in bilge water can limit removal efficiency especially when very dense and highly viscous oils such as bunker oil are present. Plates must be replaced when fouled, which increases the costs of operation.

== Centrifugal oily water separator ==
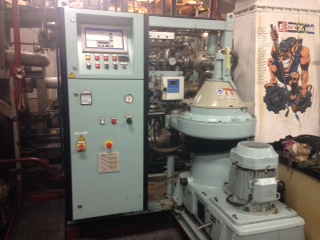
Centrifuge oily water separator

A centrifugal water–oil separator, centrifugal oil–water separator or centrifugal liquid–liquid separator is a device designed to separate oil and water by centrifugation. It generally contains a cylindrical container that rotates inside a larger stationary container. The denser liquid, usually water, accumulates at the periphery of the rotating container and is collected from the side of the device, whereas the less dense liquid, usually oil, accumulates at the rotation axis and is collected from the center. Centrifugal oil–water separators are used for waste water processing and for cleanup of oil spills on sea or on lake. Centrifugal oil–water separators are also used for filtering diesel and lubricating oils by removing the waste particles and impurity from them.

== Hydrocyclone oily water separator ==
An oil water separation hydrocyclone is a device designed to separate oil from water by the use of a strong vortex. These separators are passive (no moving parts) and resemble long tapered pipes. They typically contain an inlet section, long tapered section and a long outlet section. In operation the strong vortex is created when the oily water is injected tangentially into the inlet end of the separator. This creates a centrifugal force, that accelerates as it moves down the tapered cone. The centripetal and centrifugal forces separate the heavier water component to the outside of the vortex while the lighter oil droplets are forced to the centre. The separated oils are removed through an orifice at the inlet end of the cone and treated water is discharged through the opposite end. The centrifugal forces generated inside the vortex of the better de-oiling hydrocyclone separators are of the order of 1,000 times the force of gravity. This is why smaller emulsified oil droplets as low as 15 microns can be removed.

Oil removal hydrocyclones, or de-oiling hydrocyclones, are very different in geometry, design and operation compared to the more common solid removal hydrocyclones. When correctly designed and operated oil removal Hydrocyclones are very useful for removing both large oil droplets and smaller emulsified oil droplets in a broad range of applications across many industries. The technology has been successfully applied to treat oily water produced in the mining industry, meat processing, dairy manufacturing, petrochemical, oil refining, oil marketing and oil production operations.

== Flotation ==
Flotation introduces gas bubbles to enhance oil removal. The gas bubbles attach to the oil droplets to increase the rise rate of the oil. Various flotation methods such as dissolved gas flotation (DGF), dissolved air flotation (DAF), and induced gas flotation (IGF) may be used. Typically this separation step is used following a primary oil–water separation step which is able to remove a large portion of the free oil.

== Nut shell filtration ==
Nut shell filtration uses nut shell media in a vessel to remove oil. Nut shell filters were designed to separate crude oil from oilfield produced water in the 1970s. Typically, nut shell filters are used as a polishing step to achieve low oil concentrations (<10 mg/L). Oil is collected in the interstitial spaces between the media and periodically removed during a backwash procedure.

== Electrochemical ==
Wastewater purification of oils and contaminates by electrochemical emulsification is actively in research and development. Electrochemical emulsification involves the generation of electrolytic bubbles that attract pollutants such as sludge and carry them to the top of the treatment chamber. Once at the top of the treatment chamber the oil and other pollutants are transferred to a waste oil tank.

== Downhole oil–water separation ==
Downhole oil–water separation (DOWS) technology is an emerging technology that separates oil and gas from produced water at the bottom of the well, and re-injects most of the produced water into another formation which is usually deeper than the producing formation, while the oil and gas rich stream is pumped to the surface. DOWS effectively removes solids from the disposal fluid and thus avoids injectivity impairment caused by solids plugging. Simultaneous injection using DOWS minimizes the opportunity for the contamination of underground sources of drinking water (USDWs) through leaks in tubing and casing during the injection process.

== Bioremediation ==
Bioremediation is the use of microorganisms to treat contaminated water. A carefully managed environment is needed for the microorganisms which includes nutrients and hydrocarbons such as oil or other contaminates, and oxygen.

In pilot scale studies, bio-remediation was used as one stage in a multi-stage purification process involving a plate separator to remove the majority of the contaminants and was able to treat pollutants at very low concentrations including organic contaminates such as glycerol, solvents, jet fuel, detergents, and phosphates. After treatment of contaminated water, carbon dioxide, water and an organic sludge were the only residual products.

== See also ==
- List of waste-water treatment technologies
