= Decarbonization of shipping =

Goal to reduce greenhouse gas emissions

The decarbonization of shipping is an ongoing goal to reduce greenhouse gas emissions from shipping to net-zero by or around 2050, championed by the International Maritime Organization (IMO). As of 2025 maritime transport emits 3% of global greenhouse gas (GHG) but that could rise to 10% by 2050. The IMO has an initial strategy that includes lowering, or limiting, the combustion of fossil fuels for power and propulsion to limit emission of carbon dioxide (CO_{2}); development of alternative fuels such as green ammonia, hydrogen, and biofuels to reduce reliance on fossil fuels, and adopting digital technologies to increase vessel efficiency; and reducing emissions by 40% by 2030. However in 2025 proposed IMO regulations aiming to reduce the GHG intensity of ship fuel, and the world's first global mandatory charge on GHG emissions (the IMO Net-Zero Framework), were blocked by the United States and Saudi Arabia.

== Background ==
International trade of goods is primarily sea-based, followed by pipeline, air, and then rail/truck. Most sea vessels that transport goods use diesel or fuel oil, generating carbon dioxide. The maritime shipping industry transported almost 11 billion metric tonnes of cargo in 2022, which accounts for nearly 3% of global carbon dioxide emissions. These emissions and potential oil spills can pose chronic risks to coastal regions, marine life, and ultimately ocean health in terms of pH and ecological diversity. A decrease in pH would make the oceans more acidic, lower free carbonates (which are a component of shellfish and corals exoskeletons/scaffolds), and decrease CO_{2} conversion to carbonates. These are some of the environmental effects of shipping.

Although the industry was not a focus of attention of the Paris Climate Accord signed in 2016, the United Nations and the IMO have discussed CO_{2} emissions goals and limits. The First Intersessional Meeting of the IMO Working Group on Greenhouse Gas Emissions took place in Oslo, Norway in 2008. It was tasked with developing the technical basis for the reduction mechanisms that may form part of a future IMO regime to control greenhouse gas emissions from international shipping, and a draft of the actual reduction mechanisms themselves, for further consideration by the IMO's Marine Environment Protection Committee (MEPC). In 2018, the industry discussed in London placing limits to cut levels from a benchmark of 2008 carbon dioxide emissions by 50% by the year 2050. Some methods of reducing emissions of the industry include lowering speeds of shipping (which can be potentially problematic for perishable goods) as well as changes to fuel standards. In 2019, international shipping organizations, including the International Chamber of Shipping, proposed creating a $5 billion fund to support the research and technology necessary to cut GHG emissions.

== Issue ==
Over the 2010s GHG emissions from shipping rose by 20%, but uncertainty about regulations is delaying investment to decarbonise. Many major shipping entities have pledged to cut carbon emissions with the goal of carbon neutrality by 2050. An industry forum called the "Getting to Zero Coalition" has set a goal of carbon neutrality by 2030, which cannot be met by a single approach.

In 2021 the Center for Strategic and International Studies stated that governments and shipping industry leaders, such as Maersk, Mediterranean Shipping Company, and France's CMA CGM "have shown interest in decarbonization projects." In 2021 the European Union (EU) signaled "strong policy support for maritime decarbonization through their 'Fit For 55' (FF55) proposal, a package of 14 legislative proposals."

Groups that represent more than 90% of the global shipping industry have called for a globally applicable carbon tax on the shipping industry's emissions, in order to provide financial incentives for implementation of new technologies, and provide necessary funding for research and development.

A 2021 article states that extensive research and development is needed, as well as retrofitting and operational changes. The rapidly changing industry response to decarbonization can be monitored in a weekly newsletter, several conferences, and a two day overview online course.

== Proposed solutions ==
Various approaches have been proposed or implemented, such as the use of low carbon feedstocks (methanol, ammonia) or hydrogen and electrification with energy storage, construction of ships with lighter materials with high tensile strength, and digital operations for enhanced transport efficiency and container ship packing. Some ships are partially automated with a skeleton crew to reduce the potential for human error, using telemetry based on ship onboard sensors, cloud computing, and machine learning or neural network-based decision-making.

In larger shipping operations, a digital twin is created to simulate the trajectory based on real data from the actual ship, allowing operational managers to predict future scenarios and make decisions. These tools must be transparent yet safe to avoid hijacking and interference with other ships or transport, while also being low-cost for most operators to deploy and maintain.

Electric ships are useful for short trips. Sparky, an "all-electric 70 tonne bollard pull harbor tugboat", is "the first e-tug of its type in the world." Sparky was christened in Auckland in August 2022. The world's first hybrid tugboat, the Foss tug Carolyn Dorothy, began operation in 2009 in the Port of Los Angeles and the Port of Long Beach. The tour boat Kvitbjørn, ("polar bear"), operates in Svalbard, just a few hundred miles from the North Pole, piloting a newly developed Volvo Penta hybrid-electric propulsion system. In June 2022, the Danish electric ferry Ellen made a record 90 km voyage on a single charge.

Net zero fuels could be used, for example in ammonia or hydrogen-powered ships. Green hydrogen and ammonia produced from zero-carbon electricity (solar or wind power), are "the most promising options ... to decarbonize shipping" in 2022, according to the World Bank. Biofuels can be net-zero fuels if "the production of fuel removes a quantity of carbon dioxide from the atmosphere that is equivalent to the amount of carbon dioxide emitted during combustion." On July 21, 2022, Carnival's AIDAprima "became the first larger scale cruise ship to be bunkered with a blend of marine biofuel ... made from 100% sustainable raw materials such as waste cooking oil, and marine gas oil (MGO)." As of April 2022, "ammonia, methanol and methane are viable deep sea shipping fuels, while compressed and liquid hydrogen are not", according to a World Economic Forum article. The world's first hydrogen-powered tugboat was launched in May 2022, at the Astilleros Armon shipyard in Navia, Spain, and is scheduled to enter service in the Port of Antwerp-Bruges in December 2022. Dual fuels engines, fuel storage options, and retrofit readiness are important to ensure adaptability. Stena was the first shipowner in the world to retrofit a large vessel for methanol, converting its ro-pax Stena Germanica in 2015. Stena is partnering with methanol producer Proman and with MAN Energy Solutions to retrofit engines for dual-fuel operation on diesel and methanol.

Wind power is a traditional choice for shipping. Wallenius Marine is developing the Oceanbird, a cargo ship powered by wind that can carry 7,000 cars." K Line is installing Seawing wind propulsion systems on five of its bulk carriers. The kite parafoils, which fly about 300 meters above the sea level, are estimated to reduce emissions by about 20%.

Nuclear marine propulsion has been suggested to be the only long-proven and scalable propulsion technology that produces practically zero greenhouse gas emissions. Small modular reactors for shipping are being investigated in South Korea.

The European Investment Bank invests in port infrastructure to improve sustainability and reduce global transport chain emissions, including efforts that mitigate pollution from moored ships, such as shoreside electricity and ship garbage receiving facilities. Between 2018 and 2022, the Bank funded €1.3 billion on ports.
