= 2025 Vale do Aço floods =

2025 floods in Vale do Aço, Minas Gerais

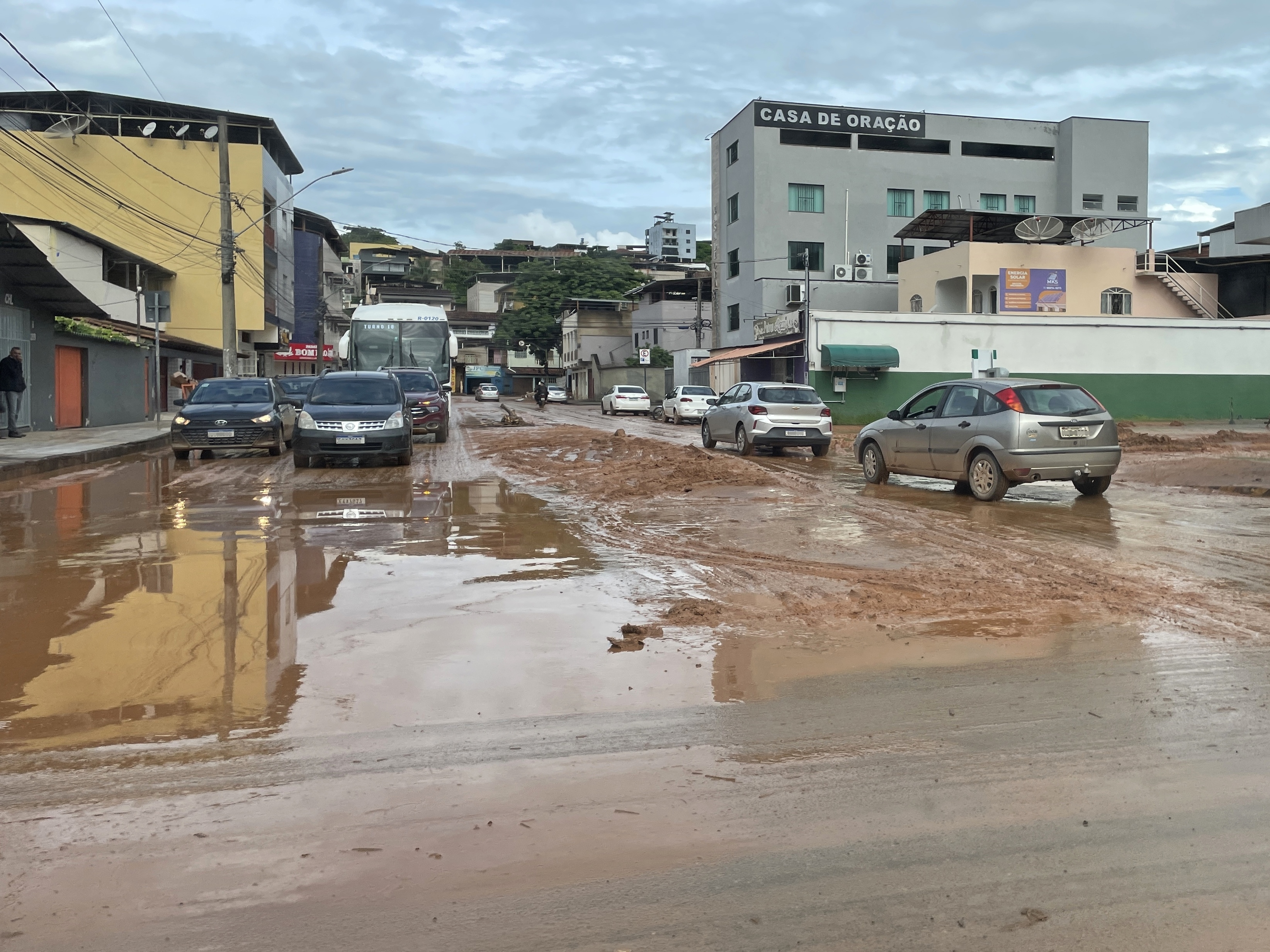
- Street covered in mud in the neighborhood Canaã, in Ipatinga, after the floods
- Date: 12–13 January 2025
- Location: Vale do Aço metropolitan area, Minas Gerais, Brazil
- Cause: Stationary instabilities and ZCAS
- Deaths: 12

The 2025 Vale do Aço floods were a series of floods and landslides, caused by extreme precipitation events that occurred in the Vale do Aço metropolitan area in the interior of the state of Minas Gerais, Brazil on 12 and 13 January 2025. The four municipalities of the metropolitan area (Coronel Fabriciano, Ipatinga, Santana do Paraíso, and Timóteo) were affected by the natural disaster, with Ipatinga being the most impacted city, where ten deaths caused by landslides were confirmed by the evening of 12 January. Coronel Fabriciano and Santana do Paraíso each reported one death during the rains. Over 180 people were left homeless, and thousands were affected.

== Context ==
The Região Metropolitana do Vale do Aço is situated in a predominantly rugged terrain region with a notable presence of favelas and urban communities. This is a result of rapid and unplanned urban growth, especially during the second half of the 20th century. With limited space for expansion, urban growth has increasingly occurred towards watercourses and hills surrounding the cities, leading to the proliferation of housing in areas at risk of flooding and landslides.

== Description ==
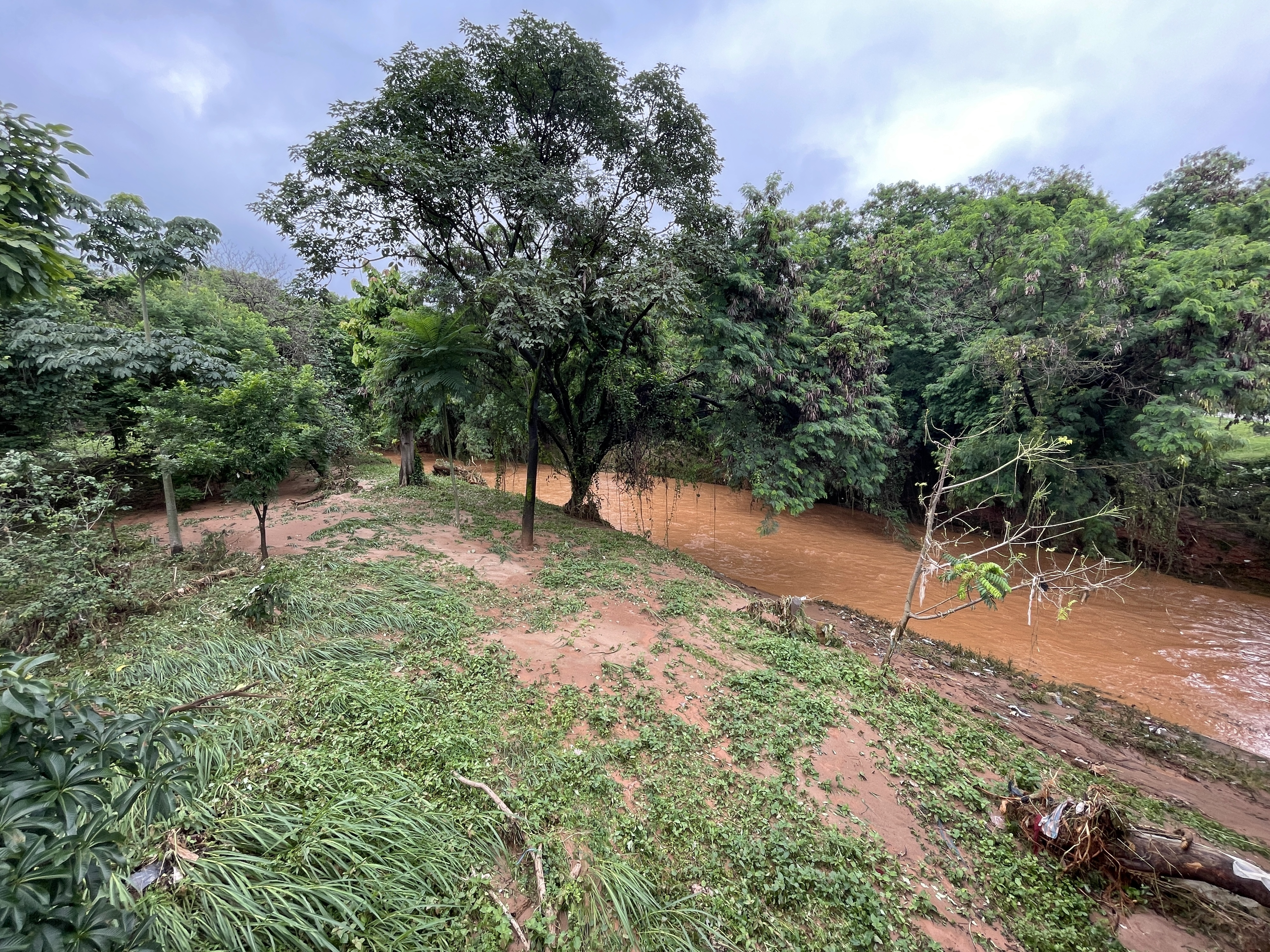
Bank of the Ipanema stream in Ipanema Park after the floods

On 11 January 2025, a Saturday, the National Institute of Meteorology (INMET) issued an orange storm warning for the region's cities, predicting rainfall caused by heat and high air humidity. However, meteorological institutes did not predict an event as intense as what unfolded in the following days.

In the early hours of Sunday, 12 January 2025, a small but intense rain cell became stationary over the Região Metropolitana do Vale do Aço. According to a rain gauge from The National Center for Monitoring and Early Warning of Natural Disasters (CEMADEN) installed in the Betânia neighborhood in Ipatinga, a total of just over 200 millimetres (7.9 in) was recorded between midnight and 6 a.m., whereas the average for January, the municipality's second rainiest month of the year, is 260.5 millimetres (10.26 in). Another Cemaden rain gauge in the Bom Retiro neighborhood recorded 122.8 millimetres (4.83 in), while an automatic weather station of the INMET in the Primavera neighborhood of Timóteo registered 115.8 millimetres (4.56 in). A measurement by the Santana do Paraíso city hall showed an accumulation of 216 millimetres (8.5 in) during the early morning hours.

Between the evening of 12 January and the early morning of 13 January heavy rainfall again struck the cities of Vale do Aço, with totals exceeding 90 millimetres (3.5 in) in Ipatinga's Bom Retiro neighborhood and 80 millimetres (3.1 in) in Canaã, according to Cemaden. In Canaã, total rainfall from January 10 to 13 reached 326 millimetres (12.8 in). The INMET station in Timóteo recorded 72.6 millimetres (2.86 in) during the same period. During this second episode of intense rain, alerts from the Civil Defense were sent to residents' cell phones, accompanied by sirens, warning of a high risk of new landslides and floods. Climatempo attributed the extreme rainfall to the South Atlantic Convergence Zone (ZCAS), highlighting that this phenomenon caused significant rainfall in other parts of Southeast Brazil during the first half of January 2025.

== Aftermath ==
=== Ipatinga and Santana do Paraíso ===
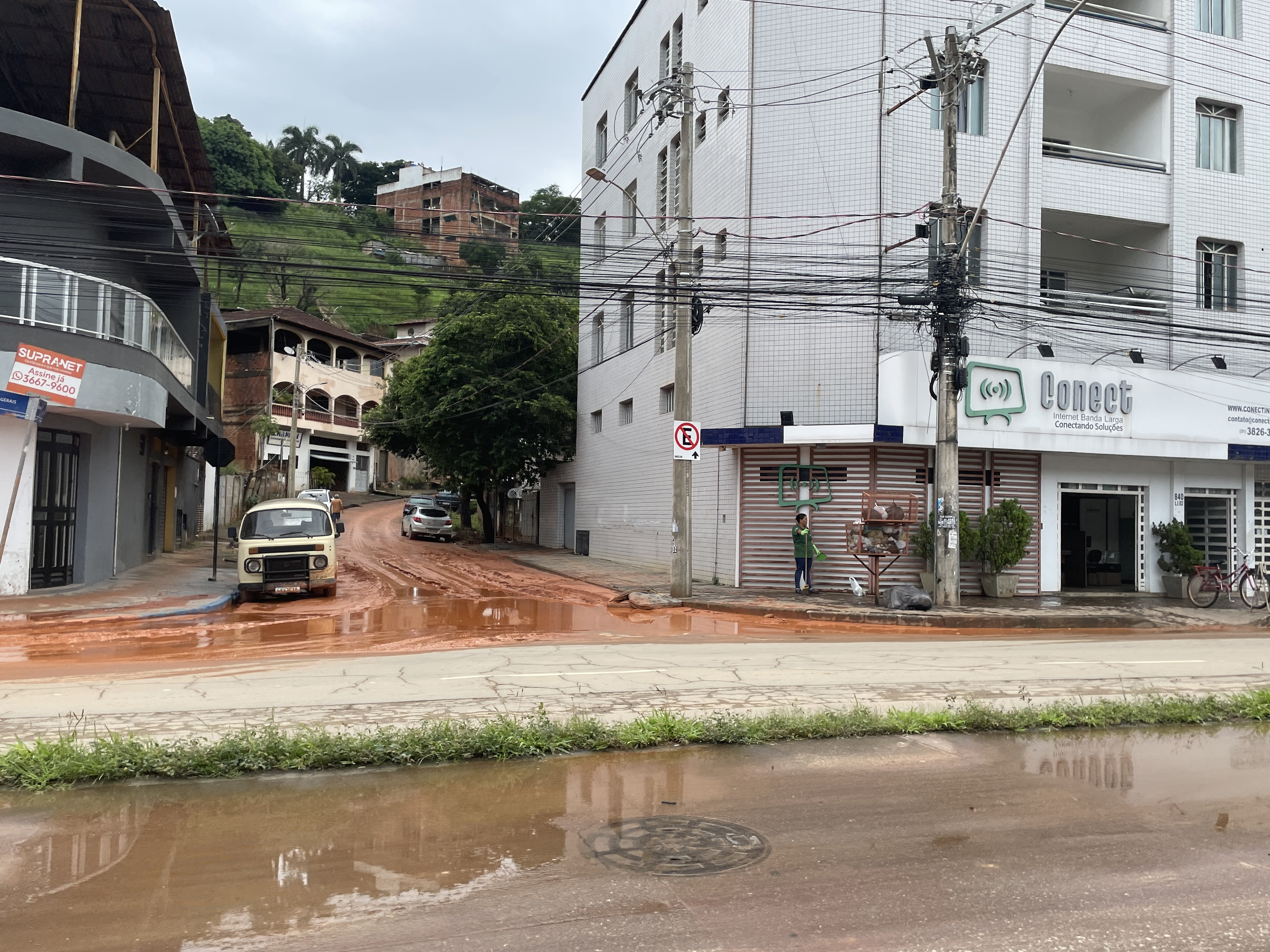
Street covered in mud in the Jardim Panorama neighborhood, Ipatinga

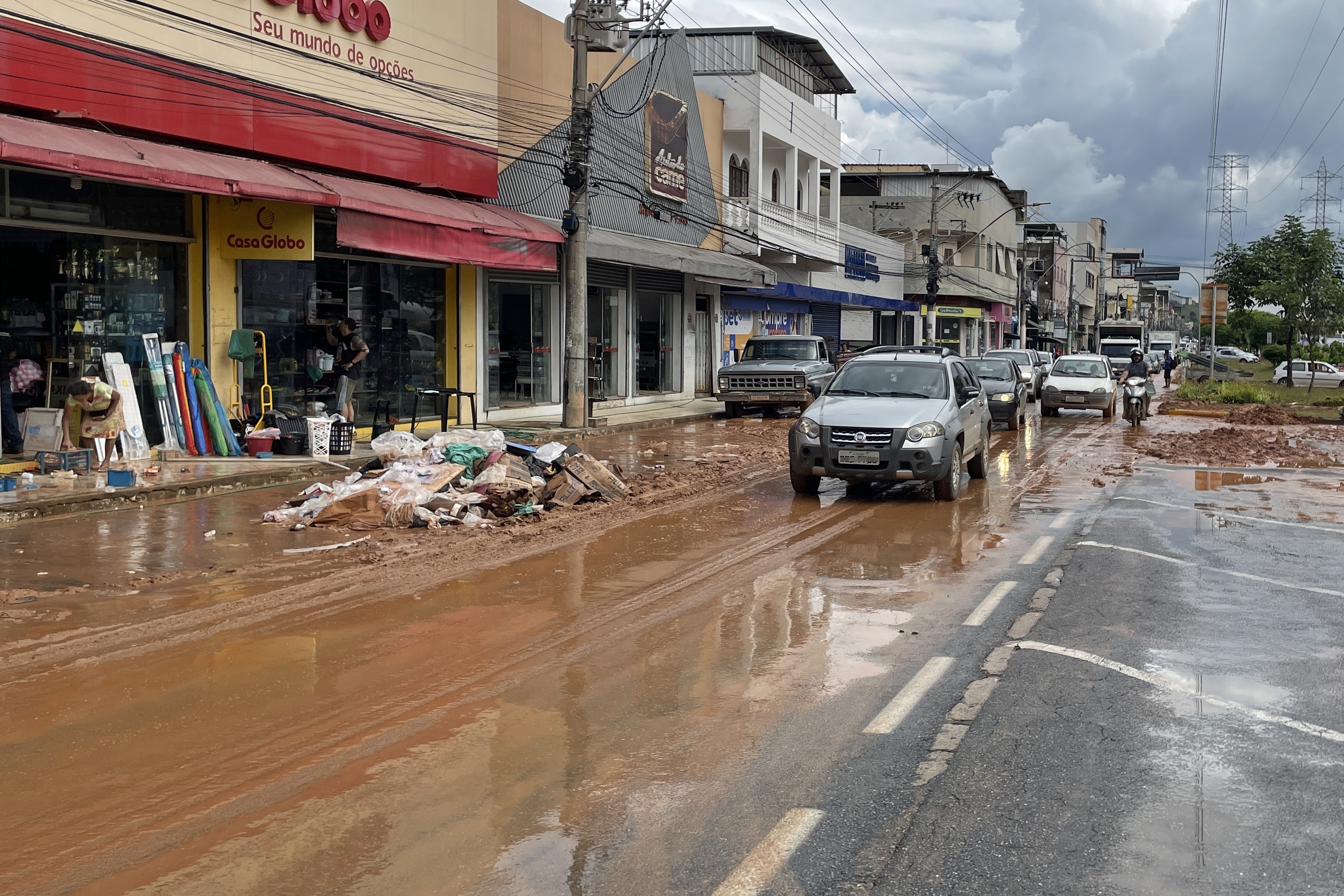
Mud and congestion on Avenida José Selim de Sales, Canaã neighborhood

Extreme rainfall caused landslides in various locations throughout the region, particularly in Ipatinga and Santana do Paraíso. In Ipatinga, ten people were buried in landslides, with fatalities recorded in the Betânia, Canaã, and Vila Celeste neighborhoods. This included two children aged seven and eight. Five members of the same family died when a slope collapsed onto their house in Betânia.

One death was also reported in Santana do Paraíso for similar reasons. By 15 January, heavy rains across Minas Gerais had caused 26 fatalities statewide since the rainy season began in September. Approximately 130 people were left homeless, and 400 were displaced in Ipatinga. The rains affected 85,000 residents by 14 January.

The Taúbas neighborhood in Ipatinga was left isolated as access to the area was blocked. In Santana do Paraíso, landslides interrupted access to the municipality of Mesquita and to the district of Bom Jesus do Bagre in Belo Oriente. In addition to landslides, heavy rains caused flooding and inundations in several locations, with homes, businesses, and public buildings being invaded by water. The overflowing water bodies in Ipatinga, especially the Ipanema stream, which traverses the city, caused floods in various neighborhoods, with Veneza being one of the hardest hit.

The Unidade de Pronto Atendimento (UPA) in the Canaã neighborhood of Ipatinga was flooded, leading to its closure and the transfer of patients to other health facilities within the municipality and neighboring cities. The commercial sector was also affected, with reports of shopkeepers losing everything. Avenida José Selim de Sales, a major commercial artery, was heavily impacted by the floods. Even after the waters receded, mud remained on homes, businesses, streets, and avenues.

A roundabout in the Canaã neighborhood was destroyed due to asphalt collapse. The Avenida Pedro Linhares Gomes, an urban section of BR-381 passing through Ipatinga, was completely flooded near Shopping Vale do Aço on the morning of 12 January halting traffic on the federal highway. After reopening later that morning, traffic remained congested. Part of Avenida Maanaim, another major thoroughfare, was destroyed by the overflowing the Taúbas stream.

=== Coronel Fabriciano and Timóteo ===
In Coronel Fabriciano, landslides and flooding were reported. Less than a month earlier, on December 17, 2024, the municipality had been struck by another storm that caused a large-scale flood, leaving 1,009 people homeless or displaced in the city. During the storm in the early hours of 12 January a motorcyclist lost control of their bike and died while crossing a flooded section of Avenida Presidente Tancredo de Almeida Neves. On 13 January a slope threatened to collapse, leading to the closure of Avenida Rubem Siqueira Maia, one of Coronel Fabriciano's main roads. A bridge over the Caladão stream also had to be cordoned off due to structural damage caused by the force of the water, and the road connecting the city to the Serra dos Cocais rural area was blocked by debris.

In Timóteo, a landslide isolated part of the city, and the Fórum Geraldo Perlingeiro de Abreu was flooded during the downpour on the morning of 12 January. In this municipality, around 260 families were affected, including those left homeless and displaced.

== See also ==
- 2026 Zona da Mata floods
