= Alfa Laval =

Swedish manufacturing company

Alfa Laval AB

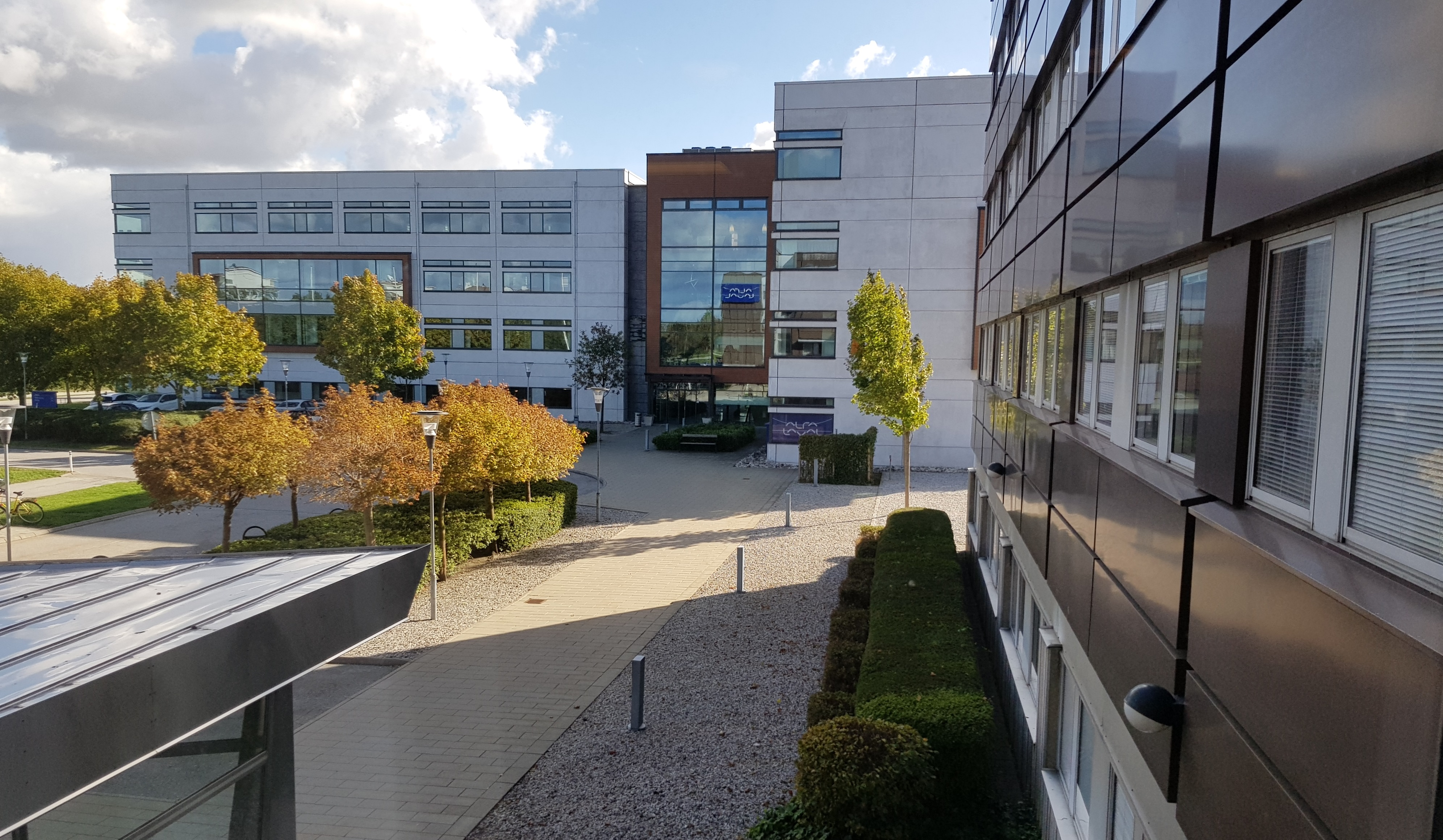
- Alfa Laval's global HQ in Lund, Sweden
- Type: Publicly traded aktiebolag
- Traded as: Nasdaq Stockholm: ALFA; OMX Stockholm 30 component
- ISIN: SE0000695876
- Industry: Manufacturing, engineering and service
- Founded: 1883; 143 years ago
- Founders: Gustaf de Laval and Oscar Lamm
- Headquarters: Rudeboksvägen 1, Lund, Sweden
- Key people: Tom Erixon (President and CEO), Anders Narvinger (Chairman)
- Revenue: ▼40.911 billion kr (2021)
- Operating income: ▲6.142 billion kr (2021)
- Net income: ▲4.801 billion kr (2021)
- Total assets: ▲64.361 billion kr (2021)
- Total equity: ▲32.344 billion kr (2021)
- Number of employees: ▲17,883 (2021)
- Website: www.alfalaval.com

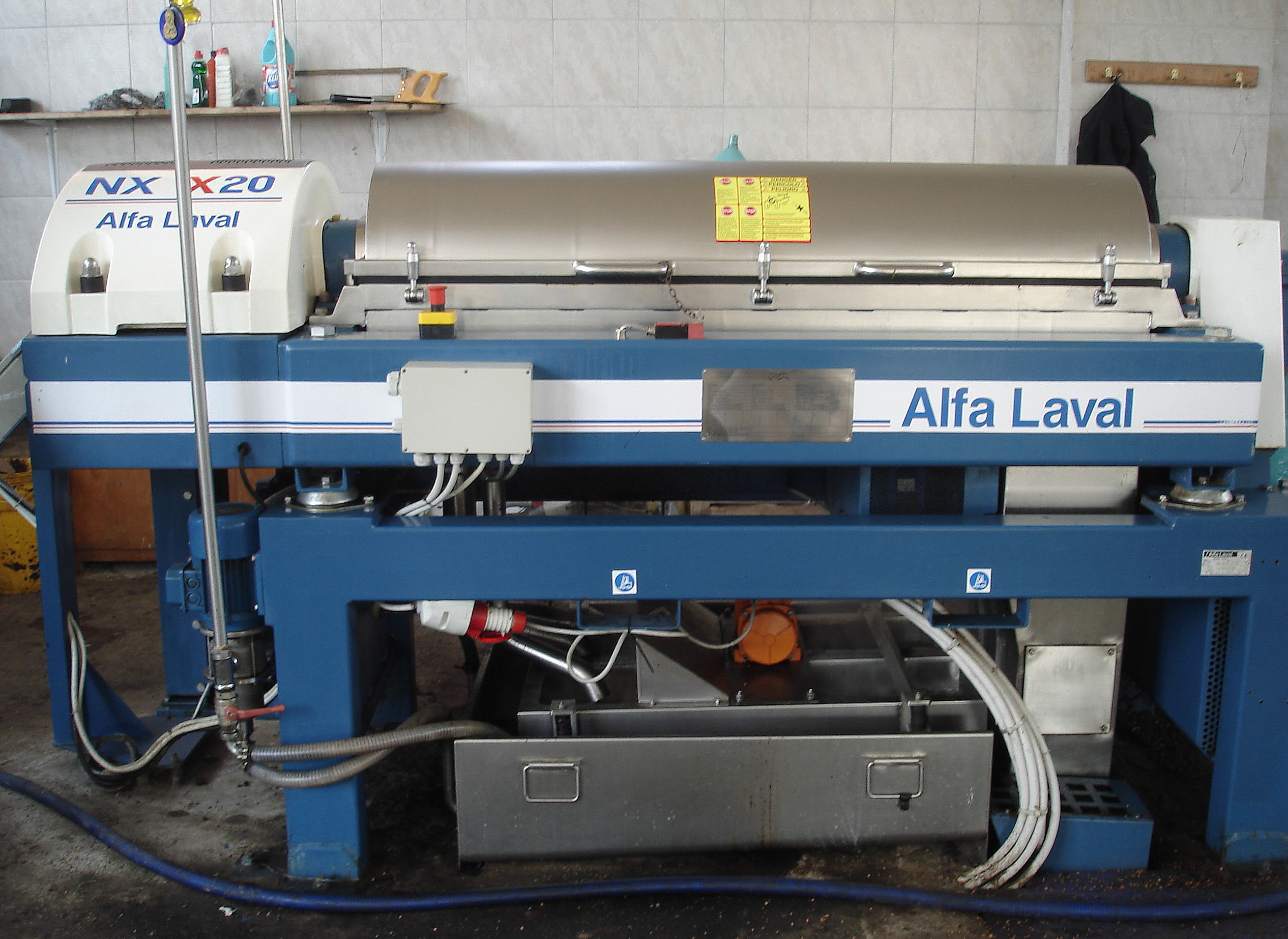
An Alfa Laval decanter centrifuge used in olive oil production in Greece

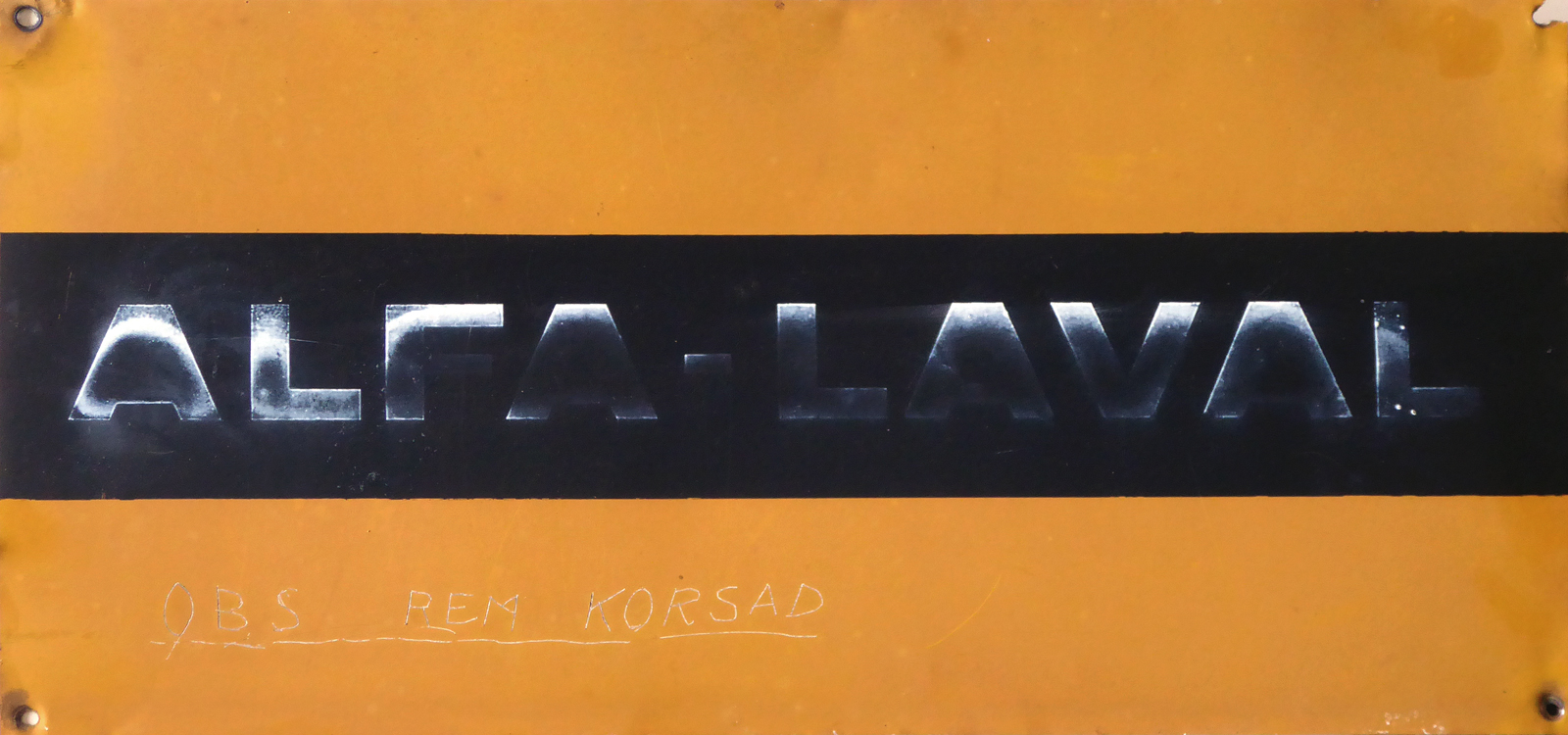
Old ALFA-LAVAL logo to be put on farms where their equipment was used.

Alfa Laval AB is a Swedish company, founded in 1883 by Gustaf de Laval and Oscar Lamm. The company started by providing centrifuges to dairies to be used to separate cream from milk. It now deals in the production of specialised products for heavy industry. The products are used to heat, cool, separate and transport such products as oil, water, chemicals, beverages, foodstuffs, starch and pharmaceuticals.

Alfa Laval is headquartered in Lund, Sweden and has subsidiary companies in over 100 countries around the world, including South Africa, Denmark, Italy, India, Japan, China, Netherlands, and the United States. As of the end of 2021, Alfa Laval had a global workforce of 18,574 employees and revenue of $4.77 billion.

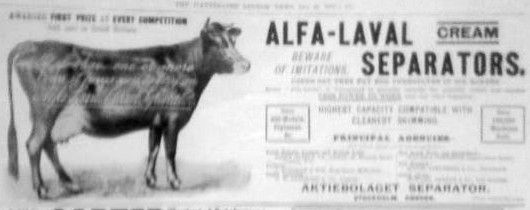
Advertisement from 1899

== Company structure and end-markets ==
Alfa Laval is a heavy industry company that focuses on the large-scale operations, such as the Marine, Energy, Food & Water industries.

=== Alfa Laval Marine division ===
Alfa Laval manufactures valves, pumps, heat exchangers, evaporators, distillers, oil separators, filters, ballast water treatment systems, and all other hardware vital to the operation of a ship's engine room. As of 2011, Alfa Laval consolidated its Marine, Offshore, and Diesel divisions into one, Marine & Diesel, division in an effort to simplify logistics and administration of its marine wing to better serve maritime industry.

Alfa Laval's Marine division works with end-markets in shipbuilding, offshore oil and gas, and diesel & gas-engine power. The division also develops technology to help marine customers comply with environmental regulations. Product areas include marine separation and heat transfer equipment, boilers and gas systems, and pumping systems.

In 2014, Alfa Laval acquired marine pump manufacturer Framo AS. It was Alfa Laval's largest acquisition to that point, in order to further expanded the company's offering of marine equipment.

In 2021, Alfa Laval acquired StormGeo, a weather analysis software provider for NOK 3.63 billion ($440 million). The use of StormGeo's digital products is increasing the decarbonisation of the industry; since 2018, their use has saved carriers 2.1 million tonnes of fuel, reducing carbon dioxide emissions by 6.2 million tonnes.

Also part of the strategy to expand digital services for offshore vessels was the acquisition in 2022 of Danish company BunkerMetric, a developer of advanced decision support tools for offshore bunker vessels. The use of tools from both solutions will help optimise and improve the efficiency of maritime carriers. BunkerMetric's procurement optimisation tool will be part of the subscription of StormGeo's existing offering.

=== Alfa Laval Energy division ===
Alfa Laval's Energy division has a long track record working with end-markets in oil & gas drilling and production, oil & gas and renewable fuel processing & transportation, oil refineries, and the petrochemicals industry. Other areas include HVAC applications, district heating and district cooling, power generation, engine cooling, pulp, paper, municipal and industrial waste treatment and recycling, bio-based material, mining and minerals. Product areas include heat exchanger and industrial scale centrifugal separation technologies.

=== Alfa Laval Food & Water division ===
Alfa Laval's Food & Water division works with end-markets in food manufacturing, dairy, pharmaceuticals, ethanol, starch, sugar, municipal wastewater and industrial wastewater treatment, proteins, biotech, vegetable oils, and breweries. Product areas include high speed separators, food systems, food heat transfer, decanters, and hygienic fluid handling technologies.

In 2022, Alfa Laval acquired Desmet, part of the Desmet Ballestra, a world leader in engineering and supplying processing plants and technologies for edible oils and biofuel sectors. This acquisition is to support Alfa Laval's transformation towards renewable fuels.

== History ==
=== Origins and early expansion ===
Alfa Laval was founded as AB Separator by Swedish inventor Gustaf de Laval and engineer Oscar Lamm in Stockholm in 1883. The De Laval Cream Separator Co., an American subsidiary, was founded the same year.

The company's origin was de Laval's invention of a continuous milk separator, which he and Lamm had first patented in 1878. Prior to this, dairy producers manually skimmed cream from milk, which was laborious and time-consuming. Capable of handling up to 130 litres per hour, de Laval's centrifugal separator made this process easier and more efficient.

In 1888, AB Separator also began selling pumps to transport skimmed milk from the separator. In 1890, AB Separator introduced the first continuous separator with disc stacks featuring conical metal discs called Alfa Discs, which increased the separation capacity.

AB Separator was a privately held company until 1901, when it was listed on the Stockholm Stock Exchange. The company continued to expand internationally in the early 1900s, opening subsidiaries in Denmark, South Africa, Finland, Australia, New Zealand, Poland, Yugoslavia and Ireland by 1936.

In 1938, AB Separator began manufacturing its first heat exchanger. These were produced in Lund, Sweden, where later became the company's headquarters.

=== Name and ownership changes ===
In 1963, AB Separator changed its name to Alfa-Laval AB, combining the name of the company's founder with a reference to the Alfa Disc technology in its separators.

In 1991, the company returned to private ownership after it was acquired by the Swedish packaging group Tetra Pak. It was then renamed Alfa Laval AB and made into an independent industrial group within the newly formed Tetra Laval Group.

Tetra Laval sold a majority stake of Alfa Laval to the Swedish private equity group Industri Kapital (now known as IK Investment Partners) in 2000, who purchased the company with the intention of listing it publicly within a five-year period. Alfa Laval returned to the Stockholm Stock Exchange in 2002. As of 2019, Tetra Laval has retained a 29.1% minority stake in the company.

== International operations ==
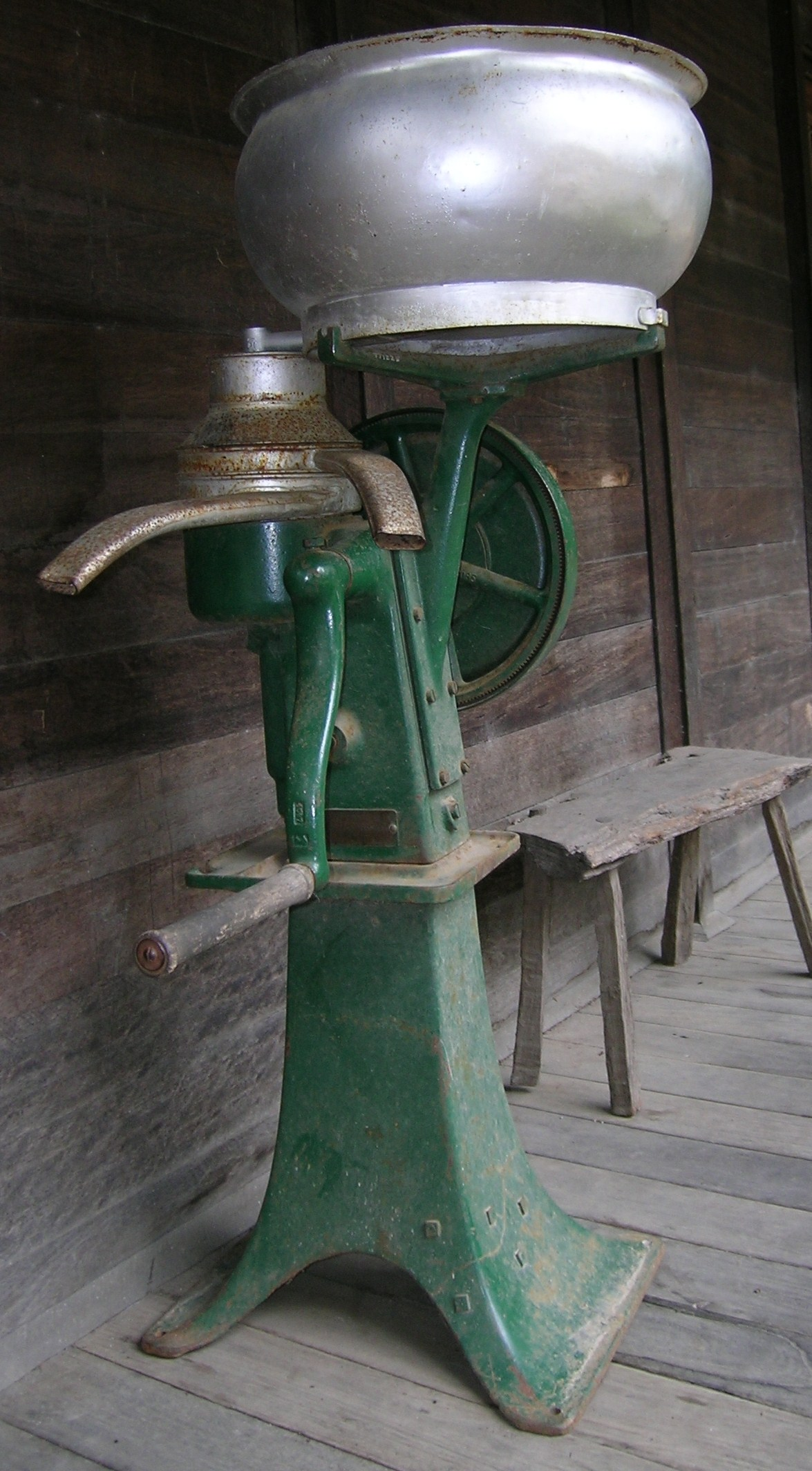
An Alfa Laval cream separator

Manufacturing at Alfa Laval is carried out in several countries including Sweden, India, China, the UK, and USA.

As of 2022, Alfa Laval has over forty manufacturing units globally and holds more than 2,000 patents.

=== Canada ===
In Canada, Alfa Laval has had a presence for over 100 years, previously as DeLaval, which would provide such services to farmers as assisting them in the storage of their milk and providing cream separators. Alfa Laval is headquartered in Toronto and in 2009 opened a service centre in Edmonton, Alberta. In late 2010, staff in the Canadian operations numbered 74.

=== United States ===
Alfa Laval has been present in the United States of America for over 130 years—marketing and supplying heat exchangers, separators, decanters, pumps, tank cleaning devices, valves and fittings.

=== United Kingdom ===
Alfa Laval's head office in UK is located in Camberley, Surrey. Their pumps and manufacturing division was located in Eastbourne before closing in 2023, with further sales office in Birmingham.

== Sustainability partnerships ==
Much of Alfa Laval's current development is focused on technologies for improving energy efficiency to reduce carbon emissions, meeting marine environmental regulations, and providing cleaner water. The company is also a participant in a number of global partnerships for improving sustainability.

In 2018, Alfa Laval became a part-owner in Malta, Inc., for which they also supply heat transfer technologies. Incubated at X Development (formerly Google X), Malta Inc. is developing a new thermal energy storage solution that will enable the shift to renewable energy sources.

Also in 2021, Alfa Laval and Wallenius Marine formed a joint venture called AlfaWall Oceanbird. The partnership aims to supply wind propulsion solutions for the shipping industry, in order to reduce emissions.

== Business management ==
=== CEOs ===
- 1883–1886 – Oscar Lamm
- 1887–1915 – John Bernström
- 1915–1922 – Erik Bernström
- 1922–1946 – Axel Wästfelt
- 1946–1960 – Harry G. Faulkner
- 1960–1980 – Hans Stahle
- 1980–1989 – Harry Faulkner
- 1989–1991 – Lars Kylberg
- 1991–1992 – Lars Halldén
- 1992–1994 – Gunnar Brock
- 1995–1998 – Leif Rogersson
- 1997–2004 – Sigge Haraldsson
- 2004–2016 – Lars Renström
- 2016–Current – Tom Erixon

=== Chairman of the Board ===
- 1932–1962 – Raoul Nordling
- 1980–1989 – Hans Stahle
- 1991–1998 – Bertil Hagman
- 2000–2003 – Thomas Oldér
- 2003–Current – Anders Narvinger
