= StormGeo =

Norwegian meteorological provider

- Industry: Meteorology
- Founded: 1 April 1997
- Headquarters: Bergen, Norway
- Key people: Kim Hedegaard Sørensen (CEO); Carsten Mortensen (Chairman of the Board)
- Number of employees: 550 (2019)
- Website: www.stormgeo.com

StormGeo AS (formerly Storm Weather Center AS) was founded in 1997 and is a leading technology provider enabling weather-sensitive companies to navigate operational challenges in dynamic environments and volatile markets providers worldwide. It provides services, particularly to the offshore, renewable energy, shipping, corporate enterprise and media industries. The chief executive officer of StormGeo is Kim Hedegaard Sørensen.

== History ==
=== Foundation ===
StormGeo started in 1997 as Storm Weather Center, a spin-off of Norway’s largest commercial broadcaster, TV2. Meteorologist Siri Kalvig saw an opportunity to offer customized weather services to other industries, and it began a venture in collaboration with TV2. In 1998, StormGeo created their first weather service for the growing hydroelectric power industry. In August 2018, StormGeo was selected as a participant in the UN Global Compact, committing to ocean sustainability as a contributor to the Action Platform for Sustainable Ocean Business.

StormGeo is headquartered in Bergen, Norway, with 550 employees and 26 offices across the globe including in the US, the UK, the UAE, Norway, Sweden, Netherlands, Greece, Azerbaijan, Germany, Hong Kong, Oman, Brazil, Denmark, South Korea, China, Singapore, Taiwan, Japan, and Lithuania.

=== Acquisitions ===
In 2011, StormGeo expanded its operation into the Middle East with the acquisition of the Dubai-based weather forecasting company Met Consultancy FZ LLC, which is the largest commercial weather technology company in the Middle East and was founded in 2004 by Daniel Mathew. In 2012, the Houston-based ImpactWeather Inc. became a part of StormGeo.

StormGeo acquired Applied Weather Technology, Inc. headquartered in Silicon Valley, California in 2014. AWT provides weather and route forecasting for the shipping industry with offices in North America, Europe and Asia.

In 2016, StormGeo acquired Nena Analysis, an analysis house that delivers energy market insights, such as price prognoses and market analysis to major utilities and trading entities. This acquisition allowed these analyses to include weather data as a fundamental input component.

In 2018, StormGeo acquired Nautisk, a global supplier of maritime charts and publications to the merchant marine.

In February 2019, StormGeo acquired 51% of Grupo Climatempo, the leading company in meteorological services in Brazil. StormGeo then acquired the remaining 49% of Climatempo in March 2024.

== Shareholders ==
From June 2021 StormGeo is fully owned by Alfa Laval.
