= Marine pump =

Description of the appearance of wood

A Marine pump is a pump which is used on board a vessel (ship) or an offshore platform. While data on typical commercial vessels are incomplete, marine pumps are estimated to account for 20–30% of installed machinery and 5–15% of total onboard energy use.

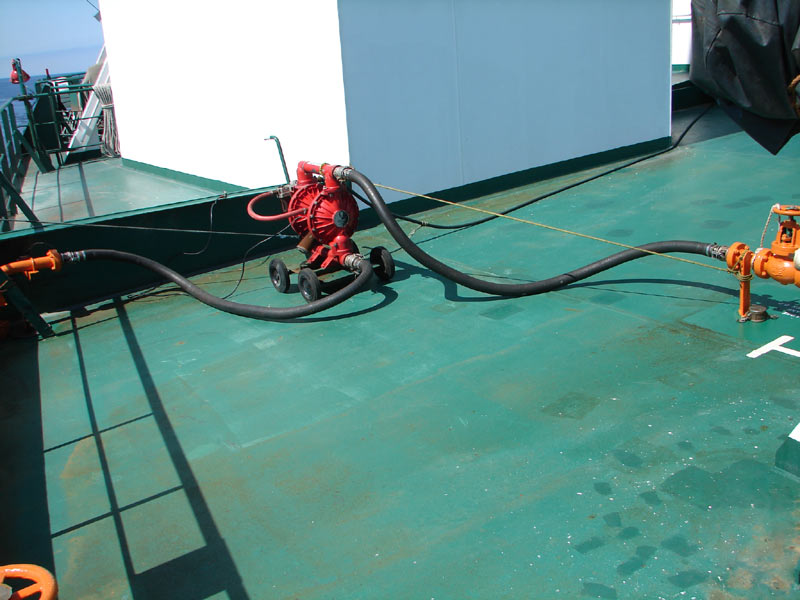
Membrane pump on an oil tanker deck, to evacuate any leak down to the slops tanks.

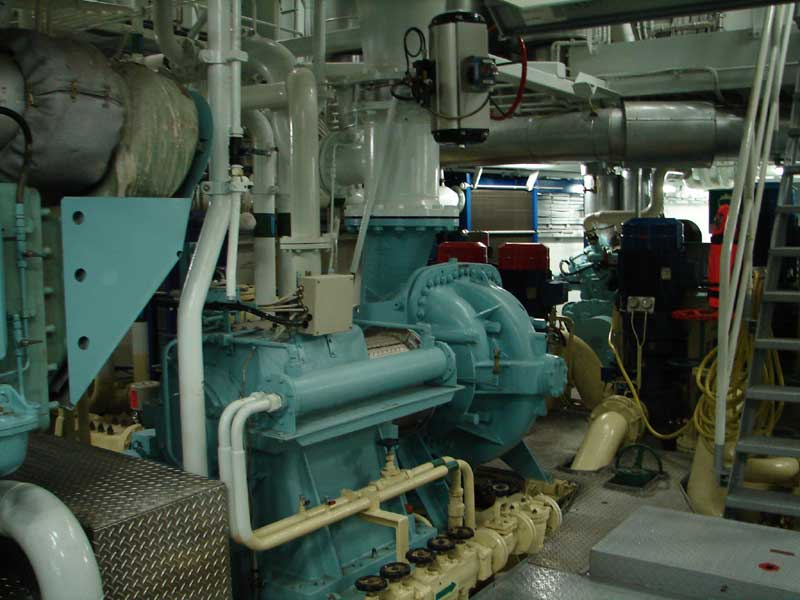
One of the firefighting pumps on the salvage tug Abeille Bourbon

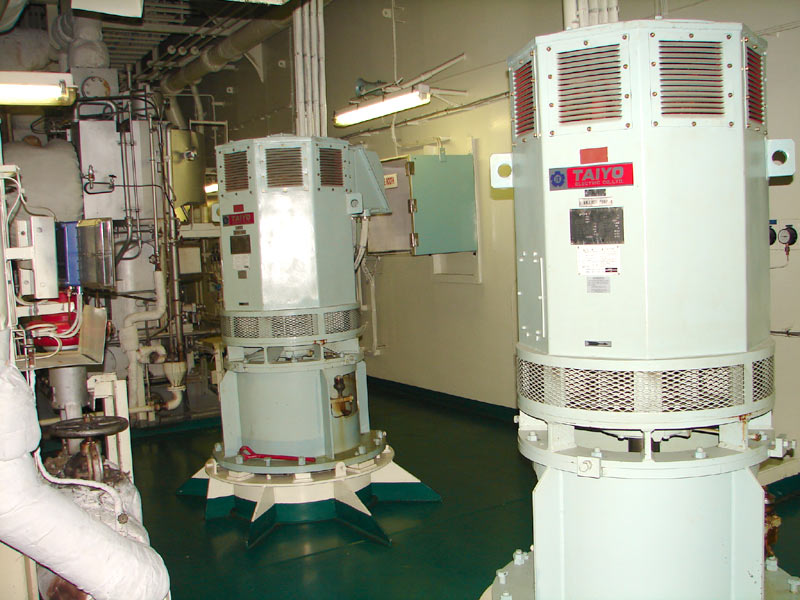
Electrical motors for ballast water pumps — on the oil tanker Algrave.

== Upper category ==
It is a kind of general equipment, usually driven by an electrical motor, refer to pump category.

It is widely used as a machine in marine industry, refer to marine industry category.

== General ==
A pump is a device that moves fluids (liquids or gases), or sometimes slurries, by mechanical action. A marine pump is an important auxiliary equipment in marine industry and ship building industry. It is widely used in all kinds of marine vessels, such as barges, tug boats, containers, carriers, ships, vessels, fixed offshore structure, drilling jack-up rigs and so on.

These marine pumps can be serviced for cooling, circulating, ballast, general service(G/S), fire-fighting, boiler feed water, condensate water, fresh(drinking) water, sanitary water, bilge & sludge, F.O. transfer, L.O. transfer, F.O. and F.S. cargo pumping, cargo stripping, hydrophone tank unit, sewage treatment unit, oil water separator, incinerator, fresh water generator, and so on.

== Type ==
Marine pump is named by its usage or application, it covers a lot of types of pumps, such as:

Centrifugal pump
used to transport fluids by the conversion of rotational kinetic energy to the hydrodynamic energy of the fluid flow. The rotational energy typically comes from an engine or electric motor. The fluid enters the pump impeller along or near to the rotating axis and is accelerated by the impeller, flowing radially outward into a diffuser or volute chamber (casing), from where it exits.

Gear pump
uses the meshing of gears to pump fluid by displacement. It is one of the most common types of pumps for hydraulic fluid power applications. Gear pumps are also widely used in chemical installations to pump high viscosity fluids. There are two main variations; external gear pumps which use two external spur gears, and internal gear pumps which use an external and an internal spur gears (internal spur gear teeth face inwards, see below). Gear pumps are positive displacement (or fixed displacement), meaning they pump a constant amount of fluid for each revolution. Some gear pumps are designed to function as either a motor or a pump.

Screw pump
a positive-displacement (PD) pump that uses one or several screws to move fluids or solids along the screw(s) axis. In its simplest form (the Archimedes' screw pump), a single screw rotates in a cylindrical cavity, thereby moving the material along the screw's spindle.

== See also ==
- Handy billy
