= Oceanbird =

Concept for wind-powered cargo vessels

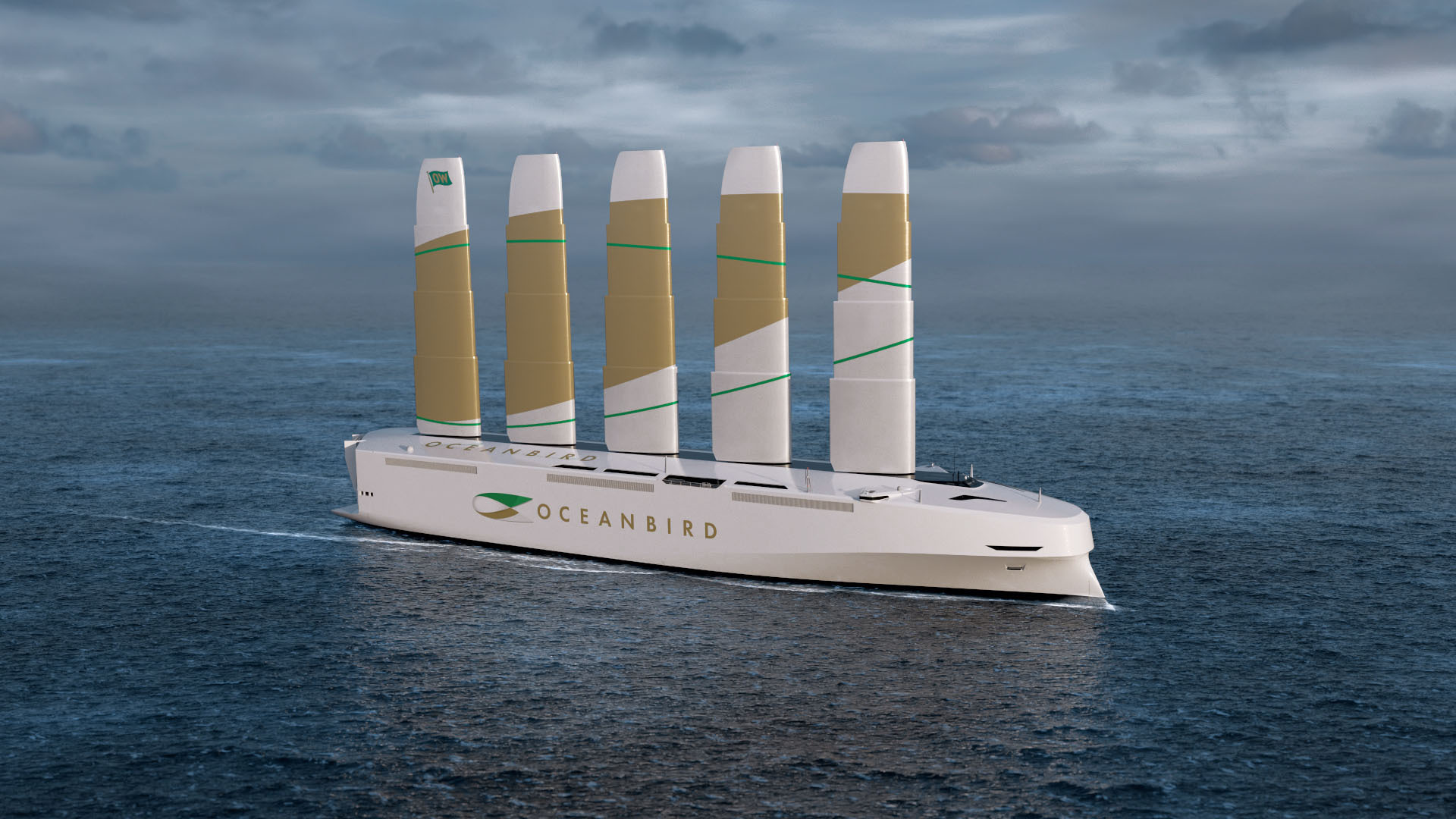

History
- Route: Transatlantic crossings
- In service: 2026 (planned)
- Status: In the prototyping stage

General characteristics
- Type: Wind-powered vessel, roll-on/roll-off
- Displacement: 32 000 tons
- Length: 200 m (660 ft)
- Beam: 40 m (130 ft)
- Height: 65 m (213 ft)
- Propulsion: Wind-assisted propulsion, four sails
- Speed: 10 knots
- Capacity: 7,000 cars

Oceanbird is the trading name of Alfawall Oceanbird AB, a company providing Wind Propulsion technologies to cargo ships. Oceanbird is a Swedish based company and a joint venture between Wallenius Lines and Alfa Laval.

Oceanbird began as a concept for wind-powered cargo vessels under development by Wallenius Marine. The concept aims to lower emissions by up to 90 percent and the design was developed in collaboration with KTH Royal Institute of Technology and Swedish maritime technology company SSPA. Financial backing for the development was provided by the Swedish Transport Administration. In 2021, Wallenius announced a partnership with Swedish heavy industry company Alfa Laval to further develop the concept's wing sail design. Construction of a full-scale prototype wing was commenced in 2023, to be installed ashore at Landskrona to test the concept and to develop the crew operation and automation aspects. Meanwhile, Wallenius Wilhelmsen's car carrier Tirranna has been prepared to receive the second prototype wing, which is planned to be fitted in early 2026.The early concept features expandable wing sails that can rotate 360 degrees and tilt down if needed and use an auxiliary engine to navigate harbors and provide emergency power. Later concepts showed a two part wing with a flap to create camber and the ability to fold in for stowing.

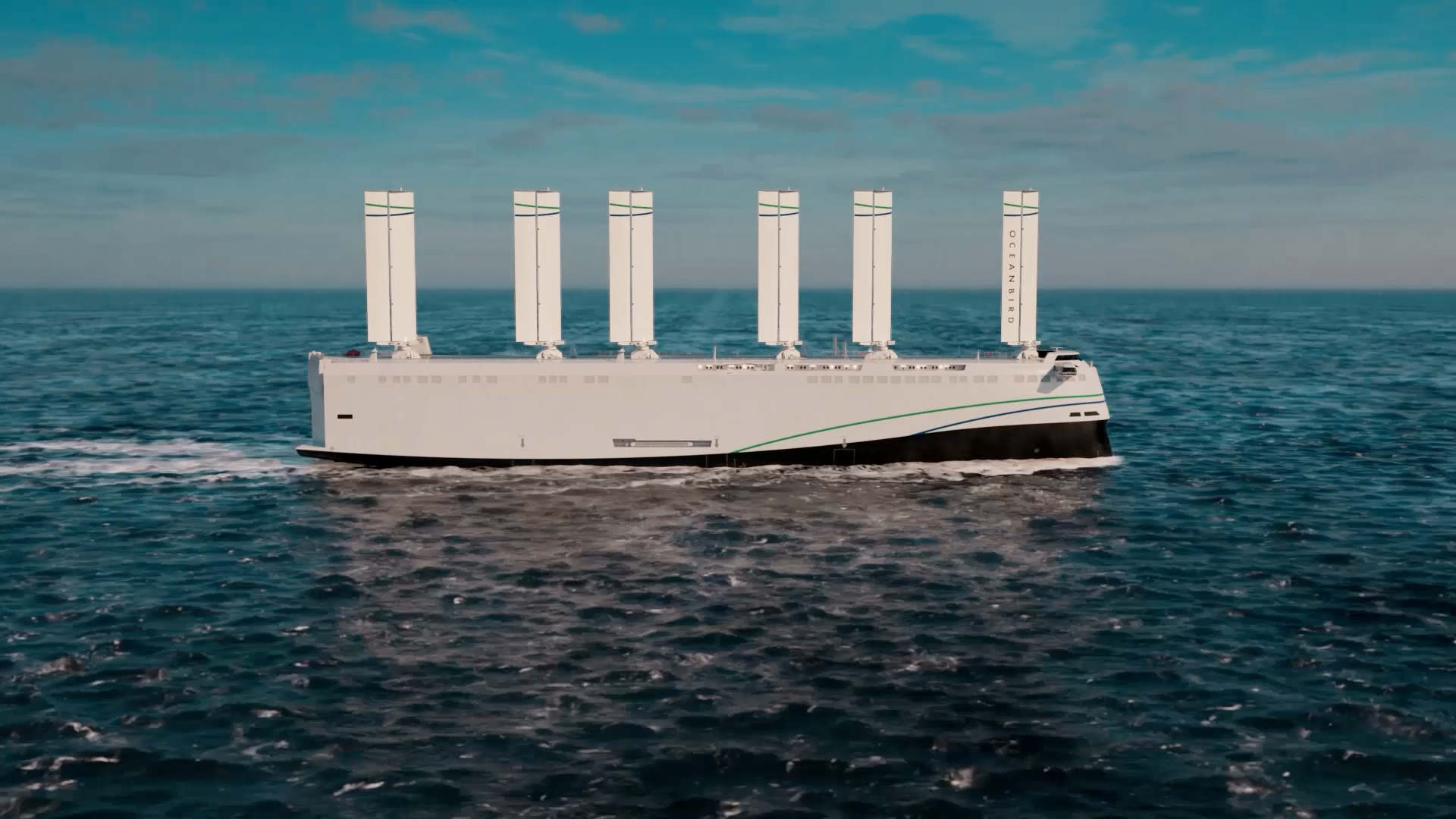
The later RoRo concept with rigid wing sails

While the design is meant to be usable for different types of ships and even retrofitted to existing vessels, the first vessel from the Oceanbird concept is planned to be a 200 m (660 ft) long roll-on/roll-off ship with a capacity of up to 7,000 cars. Such ships are optimized for transatlantic routes.

In February 2021, shipping company Wallenius Wilhelmsen announced their intention to order a vessel of the Oceanbird concept, tentatively named Orcelle Wind.

The first commercialized product roll-out has been for the Wing 560, a rigid wing sail with a main and a flap.The masts measure 40 m (130 ft) and including its tilt-able foundation reaches 46 m (151 ft) above deck. The mast and mains are composed of steel and durable lightweight composite. A land-based prototype was built in Landskrona and inaugurated in August 2025. The first on board installation of the Wing 560 is slated for completion in early 2026.

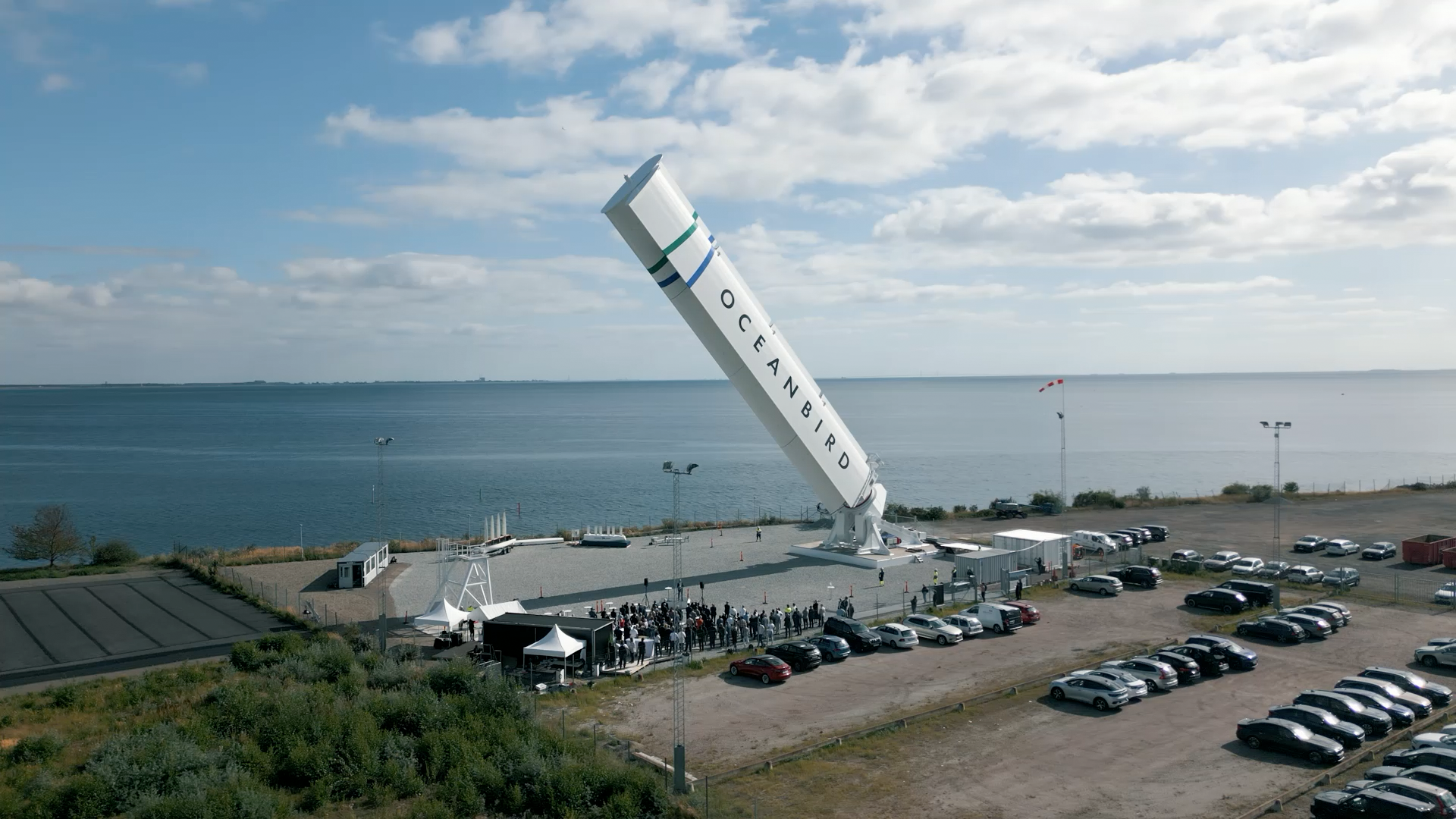
Land-based prototype of the Wing 560 in Landskrona

== Partnership with ABBA Voyage ==
In May 2022, Wallenius was confirmed as the official partner to the concert residency ABBA Voyage in London. In this partnership, Wallenius will act as the exclusive logistics provider for ABBA Voyage, in addition to providing support and consultation around sustainability. The partnership also allows for future Oceanbird vessels to be named after ABBA songs. Inside the ABBA Arena in London, the VIP lounge section is named The Oceanbird Departure Lounge, as an homage to the namesake wind-powered concept.

== See also ==
- Wind-assisted propulsion
