= Handy billy =

Nautical term with several meanings

A handy billy (also spelled handy-billie) is a nautical term with several different meanings. On sailboats, a handy billy is a set of all-purpose block and tackle designed to provide mechanical advantage. In the U.S. Navy, a handy billy is a portable, gasoline-powered emergency pump. In the Canadian Pacific Northwest, a handy billy is a wooden motorboat with an outboard motor covered by a housing.

== On sailing vessels ==
On sailing vessels, a handy billy is a set of all-purpose block and tackle. It consists of a line reeved through two or more blocks (pulleys), designed to be used in any situation requiring moving or lifting heavy loads. Bernard Moitessier used a handy billy to bend the steel bowspirit on his sloop Joshua back into place after it bucked sideways.

== In the U.S. Navy ==
In the U.S. Navy, the handy billy (formally designated the P-60 because it pumped 60 gallons per minute) was a gasoline-powered emergency portable pump aboard most U.S. Navy ships from World War I on, as well as later use on civilian crafts. It could be used during flooding conditions, in conjunction with other pumps on the ship, however it was especially valuable when the ship lost electrical power and normal pumping ability was lost. It could also be used for fire-fighting. On smaller ships, it was a critical piece of equipment.

The pump gained its name because it was very “handy” and dependable. It was especially handy because it could be easily transported from place to place by two strong crew members, as it weighed 160 pounds during World War II. The P-60 pump began to be phased out in 1970, being replaced by the newer P-250 pump.

== See also ==
- Block and tackle
- Pump
