= Mesquita, Minas Gerais =

Mesquita
- Municipality
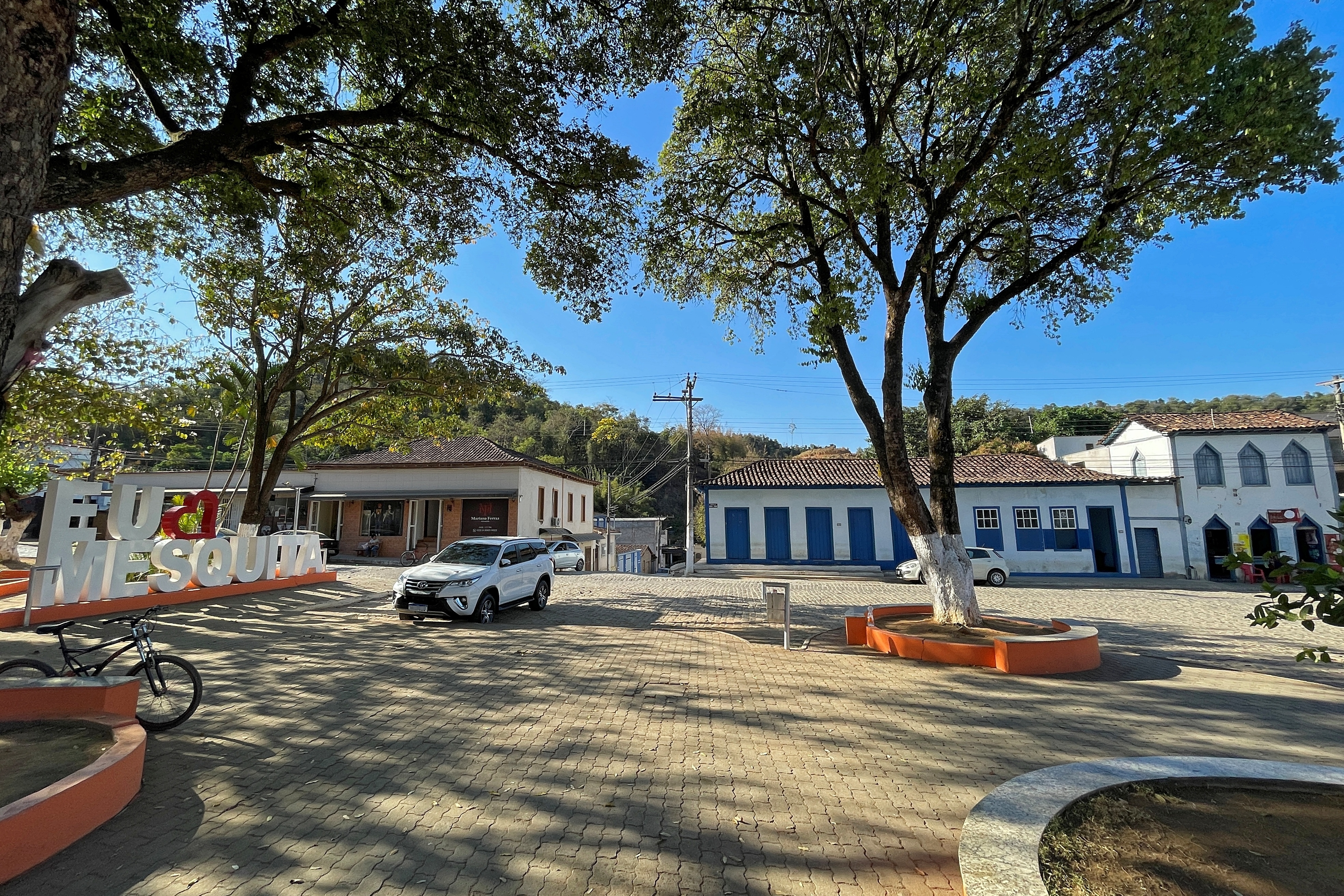
- Benedito Valadares Square with preserved facades in the background

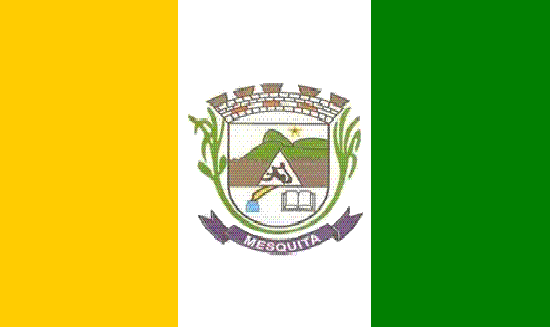
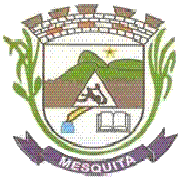
- Flag Coat of arms

- Location in Brazil
- Coordinates: 19°13′22″S 42°36′25″W
- Country: Brazil
- Region: Southeast
- State: Minas Gerais
- Mesoregion: Vale do Rio Doce

Population (2022 Census)
  - Total: 5,040
  - Estimate (2025): 4,984
- Time zone: UTC−3 (BRT)

Mesquita is a municipality in the state of Minas Gerais in the Southeast Region of Brazil.

== See also ==
- List of municipalities in Minas Gerais
