= IMO Net-Zero Framework =

Emissions pricing system

MARPOL Annex VI chapter 5
- 176 IMO member states
- Drafted: 11 April 2025
- Parties: Members of the IMO

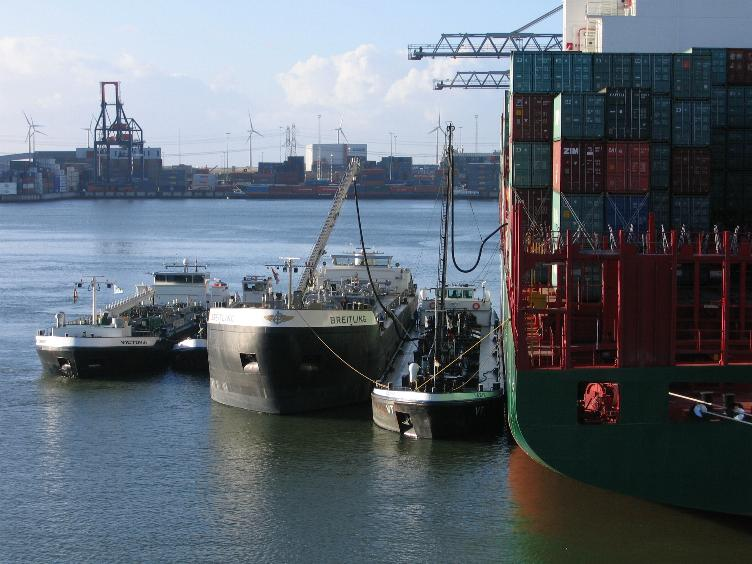
A container ship being refuelled by oil tankers

The IMO Net-Zero Framework (NZF) is a proposed United Nations system to price maritime shipping emissions. It was set to apply from 2028 to shipping in IMO member countries, applying a carbon price of 100 USD per tonne of CO_{2} equivalent. If implemented, it would have imposed a fee on vessels that pollute above a certain threshold, thus incentivizing the shipping industry, known for its extensive pollution, to become less polluting. Prior to the scuttling of the agreement by the second Donald Trump administration, the agreement was supported by the leading shipping industry lobby, most states, including the European Union, Japan, China, Britain and the United States.

The NZF would be the first global pricing mechanism for emissions, to be administered by the United Nations's International Maritime Organization. It was drafted by Marine Environment Protection Committee Meeting 83 (MEPC83) and was initially scheduled for adoption by the IMO at an extraordinary meeting in October 2025. It was delayed until October 2026, amid the second Donald Trump administration's threats of sanctions against diplomats and tariffs against countries that supported the agreement. Marco Rubio, U.S. Secretary of State, personally called officials in different countries to threaten financial penalties and other penalties. The U.S. worked with Saudi Arabia to scuttle the agreement.

Maritime shipping represents 3% of global greenhouse gas emissions. The Framework would apply to ships above 5,000 gross tonnage, which account for 85% of those emissions.

== Negotiations ==
The IMO Net-Zero Framework (NZF) was drafted by Marine Environment Protection Committee Meeting 83 (MEPC83) and was initially scheduled for adoption by the IMO at an extraordinary meeting in October 2025. However, it was delayed until October 2026, amid the second Donald Trump administration's threats of sanctions against diplomats and tariffs against countries that supported the agreement. The Trump administration's pressure campaign was characterized as "extraordinary, even by the standards of the Trump administration's combativeness."

Another key sticking point in negotiations was equity concerns related to the distribution of revenues from a GHG pricing instrument in international shipping. The Net-Zero framework is in principle, designed to deliver on the 2023 GHG strategy, not only in terms of climate ambition but also addressing concerns relating to the just and equitable energy transition. Paragraph 4.5 of the Initial IMO GHG Strategy states that '[t]he mid-term GHG reduction measures should effectively promote … a just and equitable transition'. Paragraph 4.13 states that disproportionately negative impacts (DNI) should be assessed and addressed as appropriate. The Initial IMO GHG Strategy lists criteria to assess impacts on States, and MEPC 74 approved a procedure for assessing impacts on States of candidate measures. These criteria include, for instance, remoteness, dependency on transport, connectivity to main markets, food security, and disaster response. Stakeholders at the MEPC called for an equitable approach that addresses concerns relating to the welfare of maritime works and the differentiated responsibility of wealthier states for the distributional impacts of the Net-Zero Framework. This delay leaves five procedural options in 2026: Survival, Coma, Death, Zombie, and Mutant. and Exemptions for ports in Least-Developed Countries and Small Island Developing States, alongside carbon revenue use were proposed by Argentina and Norway during negotiations. The final design opted for revenue usage over exemptions.

== Proposed system ==
In the run-up to MEPC83, countries heavily debated what form the carbon pricing mechanism should take—a simple levy was favoured by around 60 island nations. Meanwhile, 16 mainly bigger emerging market economies favoured a carbon trading system in which clean ship operators could sell their rights to pollute to emissions-heavier ones. The European Union favoured a levy on well-to-wake emissions, where part of the revenue would be earmarked to support the uptake of zero and non-zero fuels. Argentina and others supported the International Maritime Sustainability Funding and Reward scheme, which levied vessels that did not meet a GHG intensity target. Japan proposed the Zero-Emission Shipping Incentive Scheme, where revenues would be used to incentivise a just and equitable transition. Finally, Bahamas, Liberia and the International Chamber of Shipping (ICS) backed a similar feebate scheme, where funds would be administered by the IMO and targeted towards less developed countries.

In the end, countries agreed on a carbon trading system with two tiers, based on a proposal by Singapore. If ship operators were to fail to meet hard emission reduction targets, they would be able to buy cheaper extra certificates. If they were to fail easy emission targets, however, they would have to buy expensive extra credits. This system is designed to preserve decarbonisation incentives.

The IMO Net-Zero Framework sets various intermediate targets on the way to net-zero shipping emissions by or around 2050.

The NZF provides alternative low-carbon fuels with a competitive advantage compared to traditional marine fuels such as very low-sulphur fuel oil (VLSFO). It may thus lead to an increased uptake of LNG, methanol and ammonia as fuel sources. Wind energy may also qualify a ship for rewards, but the NZF rules are yet to specify by how much.

Under the Framework, companies would pay for their emissions to a newly created IMO Net-Zero Fund. The money would be used to mitigate the negative impacts of climate change on vulnerable countries, including small island developing states (SIDS) and least developed countries (LDCs).

== Policy challenges ==
Academic commentary has identified potential interactions between the IMO Net Zero Framework and domestic or regional greenhouse gas pricing instruments. One challenge relates to the possibility of overlapping jurisdictions. The inclusion of international shipping in the European Union's ETS together with similar initiatives in other jurisdictions could result in shipping emissions being subject to multiple pricing mechanisms, with differing scope and design.

The Net-Zero Framework may face legal challenges, relating to compatibility with the General Agreement on Tariffs and Trade on discrimination in trade and whether WTO law limits the IMO's ability to address equity concerns through differentiation.

== See also ==
- Initial IMO Strategy on the reduction of GHG emissions from ships
