= Climatempo =

TV Climatempo
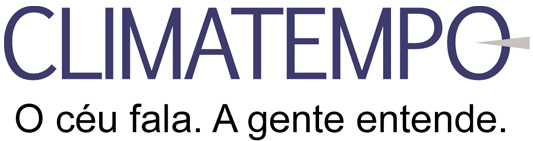
- Country: Brazil
- Broadcast area: Nationwide

Programming
- Language: Portuguese

Ownership
- Owner: StormGeo

History
- Launched: 1999

Links
- Website: http://climatempo.com.br/

TV Climatempo is a Brazilian TV channel specialising in weather forecasts. Forecasts are shown for more than 100 cities there is a five-day forecast for the capital. At the bottom of the screen, there is up-to-date information on what is happening in other cities, such as the relative humidity.
