= Unidade de Pronto Atendimento =

Type of Brazilian health center

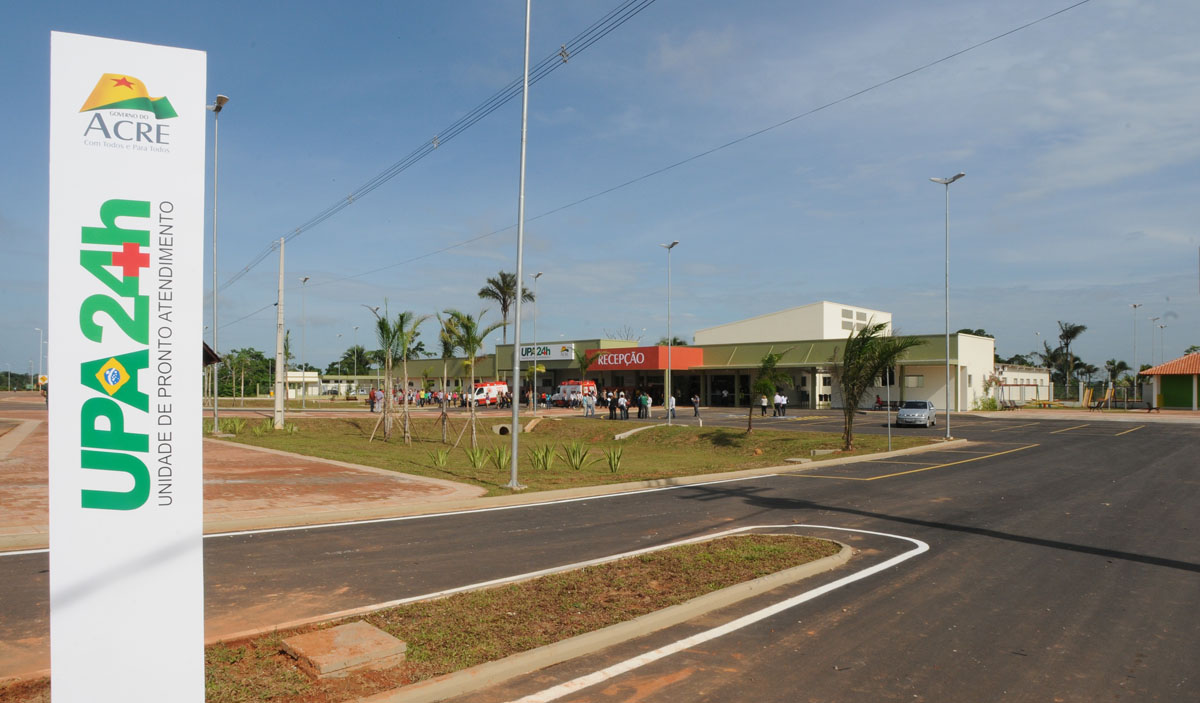
Emergency Care Unit located in Rio Branco, Acre.

Unidade de Pronto Atendimento (English: Emergency Care Unit), abbreviated as UPA or UPA 24h, is a type of health center that can be found in many cities in Brazil. They are responsible for providing medium complexity health care, forming a network organized in conjunction with primary care and hospital care. The units also have the purpose of reducing the queues in hospital emergency rooms, avoiding that less complex cases are transferred directly to the hospitals, as well as increasing the service capacity of the Unified Health System (SUS).

== Function ==
The UPAs work 24 hours a day, seven days a week, aiming to welcome and serve all users who seek medical assistance. They are also capable of solving a large part of the urgencies and emergencies; in the areas that have at least one unit, about 97% of the cases are solved on site. When a patient arrives at a UPA, the doctors provide help, control the problem, and detail the diagnosis. They also analyze whether the patient needs to be transferred to a hospital or kept under observation for 24 hours.

The UPAs offer pediatric, clinical, and dental urgency care, as well as reception, risk classification, laboratory and X-ray exams, and individual observation. They are capable of providing the first trauma care, stabilizing the patient until transfer to a larger unit. Each UPA has red rooms, for the treatment of more severe cases, and pediatric and clinical observation beds; some units also have medication and nebulization rooms. The first unit was inaugurated in 2002 in the district of Alto de São Manoel, in the municipality of Mossoró.

== Units in Rio de Janeiro ==
The first Emergency Care Units in the state of Rio de Janeiro were implemented by the State Health Secretariat during the administration of Governor Sérgio Cabral Filho and Health Secretary Sérgio Côrtes. The first unit was inaugurated on May 30, 2007, in Vila do João, one of the communities that are part of the Complexo da Maré. The implementation of the UPAs in the state of Rio de Janeiro also had the purpose of relieving the emergency rooms of the state hospitals, absorbing from them initially about 7 thousand patients daily.

In the state of Rio de Janeiro, the management of the UPAs is done by the State Health Secretariat in collaboration with social health organizations. By December 2013, the UPAs in Rio de Janeiro, besides having distributed more than 140 million medications to the population, had already performed more than 20 million consultations and 18 million lab tests and X-ray examinations. At the time, the state had 52 units, which totaled 208 beds in intensive care rooms, 608 beds in semi-intensive care rooms, and 413 consulting rooms.

In March 2018, the General Audit of the State of Rio de Janeiro, a department linked to the Audit Court of the State of Rio de Janeiro (TCE-RJ), concluded a report detailing the damage caused by the implementation of some UPAs in Rio de Janeiro during the administration of Secretary Sérgio Côrtes. In the report, the technicians considered that the procurement for the construction of the units was illegal. The "tin UPAs", made with panels and steel and that would have cost more than the brick ones, were supplied by Metallurgia Valença. In a plea bargained agreement, the former undersecretary of Health, Cesar Romero Vianna Junior, said that each unit of the type that was built generated R$1.0 million in undue advantages. The lawyers of Ronald de Carvalho, owner of Metallurgia Valença, declared that there were no irregularities in the supply of the modules.

Brazil currently has 464 UPAs operating 24 hours a day. The success of the model adopted in Rio de Janeiro has led other states and even other countries to adopt the initiative. The UPAs model was also imported by Argentina; the city of Buenos Aires, for example, had 12 units in July 2015. Daniel Scioli, former governor of Buenos Aires province, proposed the implementation of the initiative throughout the Argentine territory if elected president of the country in the 2015 presidential elections.

== See also ==
- Unified Health System
- Ministry of Health
