= Initial IMO Strategy on the reduction of GHG emissions from ships =

Framework on greenhouse gases and maritime shipping

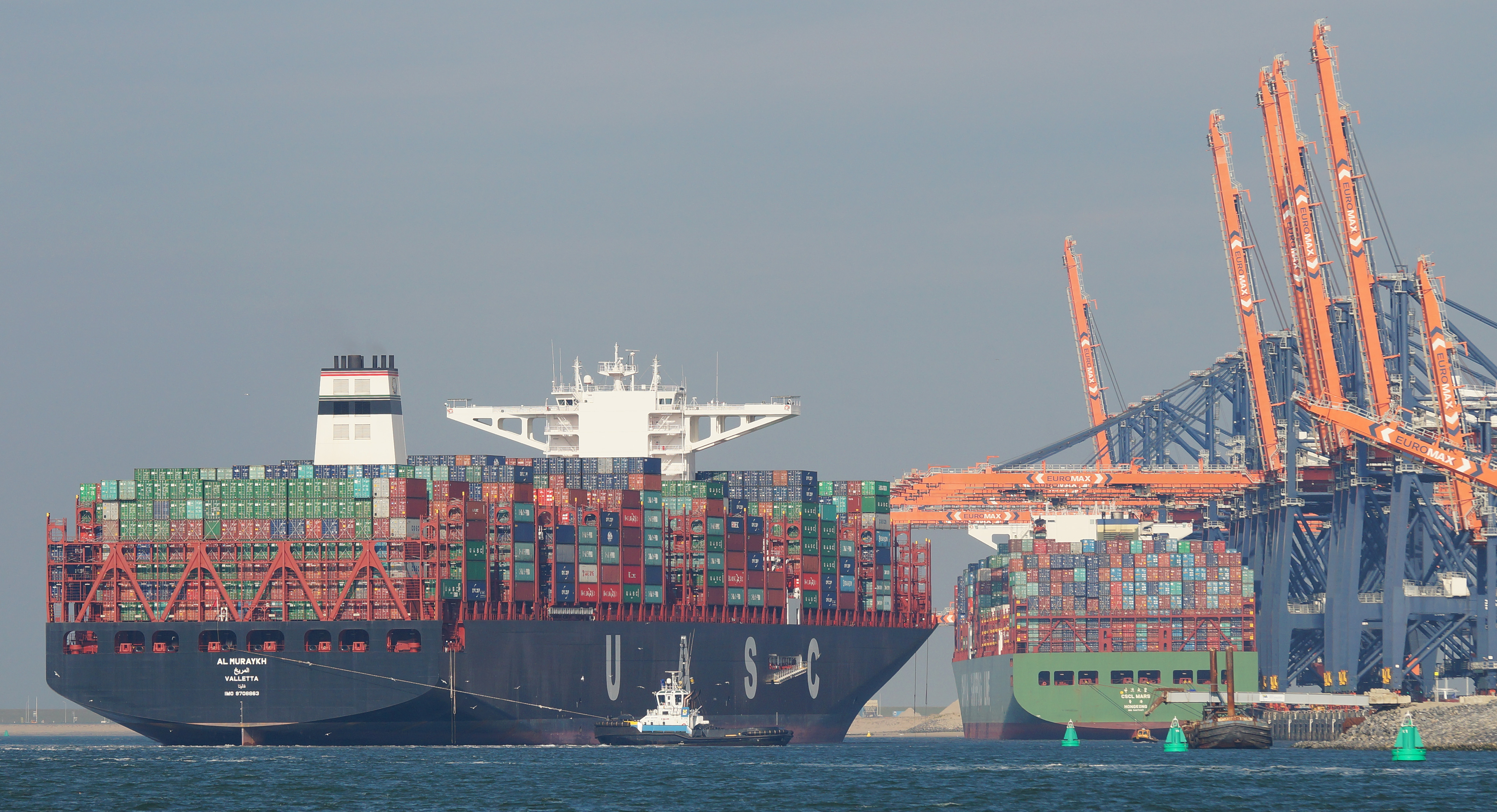
While it is the most efficient way to transport goods, the emissions from international shipping are projected to grow as a proportion of global emissions.

The Initial IMO Strategy on the reduction of GHG emissions from ships, or Initial IMO GHG Strategy, is the framework through which the International Maritime Organization (IMO) aims to reduce greenhouse gas (GHG) emissions from international maritime shipping. GHG emissions from shipping are about 3% of total GHG emissions, and under this strategy the IMO envisions their elimination within this century. However many companies and organizations say shipping should be decarbonized by 2050.

International shipping was not covered by the 2015 Paris Agreement, which seeks to limit climate change. With emissions from shipping expected to increase both in absolute and relative terms, there was pressure on the IMO to take action. In 2016, an agreement was reached to develop a strategy, which culminated in the adoption of the initial strategy in 2018. In July 2023 (MEPC 80) IMO adopted the 2023 IMO Strategy on Reduction of GHG Emissions from Ships in accordance with the agreed programme of follow-up actions.

While the policy of the IMO, the strategy is not legally binding upon members. It suggests a variety of measures which can be adopted along different time frames for member states to adopt. The strategy also envisions cooperation through which more developed countries can support those less able to adapt.

== Background and development ==
The Paris Agreement did not cover emissions from international shipping. Unchecked shipping emissions would reduce the changes of meeting its goal of limiting climate change.

While the topic was discussed at the Paris Conference, international maritime shipping, along with international civil aviation, was not covered by the 2015 Paris Agreement. These emissions are difficult to attribute, as the "flag state" (where a ship is registered), owner, crew, and ports of call can all be different countries. In addition to carbon dioxide, ships emit short-lived climate forcers such as black carbon and sulfur dioxide, as well as NOx. Understanding of how these interact is poor, making it difficult to fully assess the impact of shipping on climate change. Nonetheless, shipping is already the most efficient way to transport goods.

Under the 1997 Kyoto Protocol, responsibility for the regulation of shipping emissions was assigned to the International Maritime Organization (IMO). (This was not replicated in the Paris Agreement, which did not allocate responsibility for international transport emissions. In July 2007, the IMO began discussing potential market-based mechanisms. In 2009, the EU said shipping should aim to cut emissions by 20% compared to 2005 levels by 2020. In January 2010, Norway proposed potential targets intended to put shipping in line with expectations for other economic sectors. While no targets of market-based mechanisms were adopted following these proposals, in 2011 the Energy Efficiency Design Index (EEDI) was adopted. This implemented a set of energy efficiency standards for ships built after 2013. The same year, the Ship Energy Efficiency Management Plan was adopted, which required ship energy efficiency to be monitored. These were included in Annex VI of MARPOL 73/78. That the new regulations would apply equally to all countries regardless of economic development was a source of dispute relating to the principles of Common But Differentiated Responsibilities and No More Favourable Treatment. This meant they were passed by majority, rather than the usual consensus process. The EEDI has been expanded and clarified since its first implementation. While there were some efficiency improvements due to the EEDI and general economic incentives to improve efficiency, little significant action was taken by the IMO, in part due to disputes between companies from developing and developed nations. In 2012, international maritime transport made up 2.2% of global emissions.

In 2014, the IMO calculated that the shipping industry produced 3.1% of all CO_{2} emissions, and that shipping emissions would rise as much as 250% by 2050, at which point they could make up 17% of all emissions. In May 2015 a proposal by the Marshall Islands to create an emissions target was discussed by the IMO, but no agreement was reached. In September 2015, the IMO Secretary-General argued against an emissions cap, stating that it would harm economic growth. By 2016, regulations were in place that would apply carbon efficiency standards to newly built ships beginning in 2019, but these would not be retroactive to existing ships. In November 2015, the European Union published an analysis suggesting that although complete decarbonisation by 2050 was unrealistic, annual emissions would have to end up lower than the expected 2020 emissions by that time to meet the Paris Agreement goal of temperatures rising no more than 2 °C.

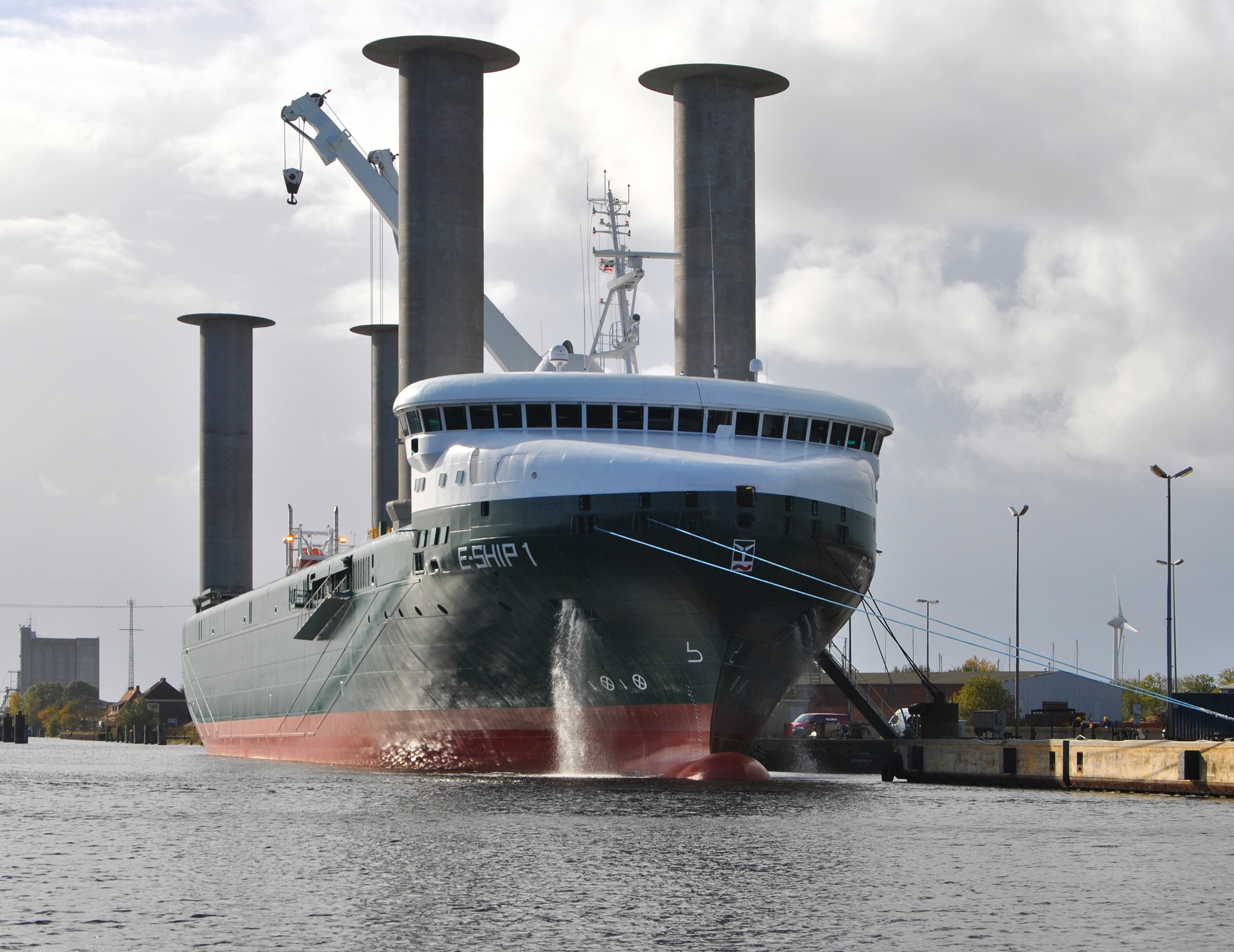
The E-Ship 1, built in 2010, is a rotor ship that harnesses wind power to reduce fuel use.

In April 2016, the IMO's Marine Environment Protection Committee (MEPC) agreed only that ships weighing 5,000 tons or more should submit fuel use data. Stronger measures had been supported by the European Union, Liberia, and the Marshall Islands, (the latter being two of the three largest flag states): opposition was led by Brazil, China, India, Russia, and the third of the three largest flag states, Panama. At this time, pressure on the IMO was increasing, especially as the aviation industry was moving towards establishing an emissions cap. Some large shipping companies supported IMO action, fearing external action bypassing the IMO if none was taken (the aviation agreement followed an agreement that the European Union would withdraw a plan to add a carbon price to incoming flights). Previously a 2013 EU proposal for the monitoring the emissions of ships entering EU ports that was adopted in late 2014 stimulated an IMO agreement to develop a data collection system. Fuel consumption reporting was added to MARPOL in October 2016, coming into force in March 2018. A number of countries submitted Nationally Determined Contributions which pledged whole economy reductions, including a reduction of emissions per unit of GDP. Shipping contributes to GDP, and so is indirectly covered by these pledges.

In October 2016, the MEPC agreed on a roadmap to develop a strategy for emissions reduction. Following its development, it was approved by the MEPC in April 2018. During this approval, the IMO also agreed to revise this strategy by Spring of 2023. The initial strategy was adopted by majority rather than consensus. There were disputes about whether decarbonisation should occur in the first or second half of the 21st century. There was also debate on whether the treaty should have quantifiable targets. The agreement on quantifiable targets happened in part due to the idea that a target provided better certainty, an argument advanced by the Marshall Islands and Solomon Islands.

== Contents ==
IMO remains committed to reducing GHG emissions from international shipping and, as a matter of urgency, aims to phase them out as soon as possible this century.

— Initial IMO Strategy on the reduction of GHG emissions from ships

The IMO strategy as passed is explicitly constructed with reference to the Paris Agreement. It sets an overall framework for future development, but is not legally binding. Within the overall aim of decarbonisation there are smaller targets for different time periods, which use 2008 as a baseline year. Emissions intensity (the emissions produced to transport unit goods per unit distance) is targeted to drop 40% by 2030, with the aim of "pursuing efforts towards 70% by 2050". At the same time, the overall emissions are expected to peak "as soon as possible", alongside a specific target of "at least 50% by 2050 compared to 2008".

Along with setting an overall vision and general principles, the IMO strategy also includes different suggested measures that can be taken to reduce emissions. These are classified as short-term (applying from 2018-2023), medium-term (2023-2030), and long-term (2030 onwards). To meet the short term goals, it is thought there will need to be rapid adoption of technical (e.g. new ship standards under the EEDI) and operational (e.g. ship speed reduction) changes, as well as the creation of implementation and enforcement mechanisms for the strategy. To achieve the stated long-term targets, it is expected that the industry will have to power ships with hydrogen, ammonia or biofuels (but shipping may be outbid by aviation biofuels), and develop new more efficient propulsion technology.

The strategy envisions significant capacity building and technical cooperation between IMO states, in order to support Least Developed Countries and Small Island Developing States. While the measures and targets apply to all ships, the Common But Differentiated Responsibilities and No More Favourable Treatment principles were referenced in regards to the implementation of these measures. While there is no detail on how exactly these sometimes conflicting principles would apply in practice, eight criteria were identified that should be taken into consideration when identifying responsibilities: remoteness and connectivity, the type of cargo, the country's dependence on transport, the costs of transport, food security, disaster response, cost-effectiveness, and level of development. To assess these for each situation, the MEPC has developed a process which cites the principles of simplicity, inclusiveness, transparency, flexibility, an evidenced-based approach, and measure-specific consideration. To facilitate implementation in less developed countries, in July 2019 the IMO established a fund supplied through voluntary donations to support capacity building and technical cooperation. Changes in the shipping sector are envisioned as occurring alongside changes in the port sector, which for example would need to adapt to provide onshore power and alternative fuels.

== Implementation ==
Member states of the International Maritime Organization

Following approval of the strategy, the MEPC adopted eight follow-up programs to be implemented before 2023. Three of these focused on potential short-term actions, including those already regulated by the IMO. One program was to develop a fourth IMO GHG study, focused on the period from 2012-2018, to help inform the 2023 revision of the strategy.

While market-based mechanisms have been repeatedly discussed in MEPC meetings, strong opposition to their use has meant there has been no agreement on their use. Reasons raised in opposition include providing an advantage to developed economies, and potential incompatibility with World Trade Organization rules. One possible market-based mechanism would be a carbon tax charged on ships weighing over 5000 tonnes, to help fund bunkering for cleaner fuels such as hydrogen and ammonia. The European Union designed a Regional Emissions Trading System, to be put into effect if it was felt the IMO did not move far enough. In September 2020, it was decided that maritime transport would be included in the European Union Emissions Trading System from 2022. Many companies and organizations say shipping should be decarbonized by 2050.

In 2025 at MEPC83 in London, the IMO members' delegates agreed on a carbon pricing system for shipping called Net-Zero Framework that would be implemented by 2028.

== See also ==
- Carbon Offsetting and Reduction Scheme for International Aviation
