= South Atlantic Convergence Zone =

Meteorological convergence zone over southern Brazil and Atlantic

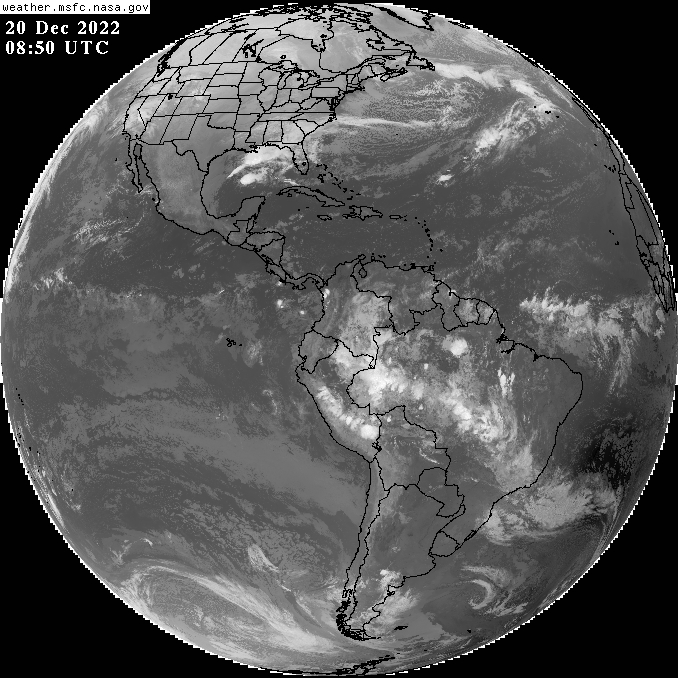
SACZ in December 2022

The South Atlantic convergence zone, or SACZ, is an elongated axis of clouds, precipitation, and convergent winds oriented in a northwest–southeast manner across southeast Brazil into the southwest Atlantic Ocean. By definition, the feature is a monsoon trough. It is strongest in the warm season. Thunderstorm activity along the feature magnifies over three or more days when the Madden–Julian oscillation passes into the region, due to the enhanced upper divergence. Low level winds over Rondônia are tied to the strength of this zone, where westerly wind anomalies correlate to active phases of the South American monsoon, while easterly wind anomalies indicate breaks of activity along the SACZ. The feature is also strongest when negative anomalies in the sea surface temperature pattern lie over the southern Atlantic Ocean, while opposite conditions prevail across the northern Atlantic Ocean.
