= Wallenius Marine =

Swedish shipbuilding company

Wallenius Marine AB
- Type: Aktiebolag
- Industry: Marine engineering
- Founded: 2003
- Headquarters: Stockholm, Sweden
- Number of locations: 4
- Services: Newbuilding, ship repair, ship conversion, ship management
- Number of employees: 800
- Parent: Soya Group
- Website: www.walleniusmarine.com

Wallenius Marine is a ship design and ship management company in Sweden. Headquartered in Stockholm, the company has additional offices in Singapore and employs some 800 people.

The company was spun off from Wallenius Lines in 2003 to focus on ship management and technical services, as well as newbuilding and design. Like its sister company, Wallenius Marine specializes in car carriers and RoRo ships. Since the 1990s, the company and its predecessor has designed and built 70 vessels. The ships are built in third-party shipyards in Japan, South Korea and China with site supervision by Wallenius Marine.

Other business areas include ship elongation, where existing cargo vessels are stretched to extend their capacity. During the process, ships are cut in half, extended and put back together. The process typically takes a few months compared to a few years for designing and building a new ship from scratch. Wallenius Marine also provides marine IT and ship management, including monitoring, communication and fleet management systems.

In recent years, the company's focus has increasingly shifted towards sustainable shipping. In addition to reducing the environmental impact of traditional cargo ships, the company is developing a wind-powered car carrier called Oceanbird. The vessel is powered by large, wing-like sails and would become the tallest sailing ship in the world. It is designed to carry 7,000 cars.

== See also ==
- Wallenius Lines
- Wallenius Wilhelmsen Logistics
- A&P Group
