= Acute to chronic ratio =

Formula to estimate a chemical's chronic toxicity

The acute to chronic ratio (ACR) uses acute toxicity data to gauge the chronic toxicity (MATC) of a chemical of interest to an organism. The science behind determining a safe concentration to the environment is imperfect, statistically limited, and resource intensive. There is an unfilled demand for the rapid assessment of different chemical toxicity to many different organisms. The ACR is a proposed solution to this demand.

While empirical methods are crucial to making scientific conclusions and informed decisions, best personal judgement is often the best tool to the regulator in allowing or prohibiting potentially toxic chemicals from entering the environment. This means taking into consideration information about chemical structure, physical and chemical properties including fate and transport in the environment, and most importantly toxicological data.

The ACR is mathematically the inverse of the application factor (AF), which was first proposed by Mount and Stephan (1967). It provides no new information, it simply converts AF values into whole integer numbers that are more easily comparable for researchers visually.

== Calculation ==
The ACR is the inverse of the application factor (AF). This makes it easier for regulators to visualize data as whole numbers rather than decimals. The AF is calculated by dividing the Maximum Acceptable Toxicant Concentration (MATC) by the Lethal Concentration that kills 50% of test organisms in an acute toxicity test (LC50).

$MATC = \sqrt{(NOEC)(LOEC)}$

The Maximum Allowable Toxicity Concentration (MATC) is determined by taking the square root of the No Effects Concentration (NOEC) multiplied by the Low effect concentration (LOEC).

$AF = MATC/LC50$

The Application Factor (AF) is determined by dividing the MATC by the LC50

$ACR = 1/AF$ or $LC50/MATC$

The ACR is then the inverse of the AF.

== Regulatory use ==
There are thousands of new and different chemicals that are designed and synthesized by private chemical manufacturers every year. The public demands that all of these chemicals go through testing and be approved for use by the EPA under the TSCA. Part of that testing requirement is determining the toxicity of chemicals to organisms in the environment.

=== Law ===
Section 5 of the TSCA states that the EPA must respond to pre-manufacturing notices (PMN) 90 –180 days after submission by the manufacturer. The EPA is responsible for identifying the substance, its proposed use, amount made, byproducts, exposure levels, and all existing environmental and health data necessary to prevent significant harm to the environment. Additionally there are no PMN test requirements so there is often a minimal amount of data presented. This may be discussed as a fault of the TSCA. New chemical PMNs are submitted early in the chemical's development so they rarely contain information about chronic toxicity - yet the EPA must respond within the 90-180 day time period after submission of the PMN. This essentially puts a huge burden on the EPA because chemical effects to the environment are extremely hard to predict simply based on single species toxicity tests (SST). The limited time period that the TSCA gives the EPA for making this decision requires the EPA to make decisions with a high amount of uncertainty. This ultimately makes the goal of protecting the environment from significant adverse effects difficult.

The results of acute and chronic toxicity testing form the basis of knowledge that regulators draw from in performing work related to ecological risk assessment and designing policy that defines how much of a chemical of interest should be allowed in certain environments. While this sounds simple enough to the layperson, it is extremely difficult in practice due to a large number of modifying factors inextricably tied to toxicity tests and statistical analysis. Different toxic effects can be observed from the same chemical through different types of environmental exposures and parameters, and thus toxicity results from acute and chronic tests must be jointly considered in decision making. Additionally, chronic toxicity tests tend to require significantly more attention and resources than acute tests which makes them much less feasible for basing decisions off of in a timely manner. The need for development of more advanced statistical methods, and uniformity in using these methods by regulators has been made apparent in literature.

Scientific methods for determining acute and chronic toxicity to organisms are inherently imperfect and non-uniform throughout the field of research, and the most useful tool for decision making by officials is more often than not best personal judgement.

A popular new method for ecological risk assessment is the acute to chronic estimation (ACE). This method uses computer software to estimate chronic toxicity, which provides similar information with much less effort and expense to the researcher.

== Limitations ==
The ACR is derived from data generated by SSTs, as so falls victim to the same errors and limitations. These limitations are described in detail in literature

Using point estimates such as NOECs/LOECs reduces a data set containing many values down to an isometric, removing the rich visual information that allows the researcher to assess the reliability and variability in the data. Information such as the slope of the dose-response curve, from which NOECs are LOECs are derived, is lost. However, without NOECs and LOECs regulatory decisions are much harder to make. While ACR has drawbacks due to the uncertainty of the point estimates it uses to define it, it is still widely valued as a regulatory tool in making environmental assessments and policy decisions.

ACRs are based on tests with a number of different methodologies, which means that there can be significant variance among ACRs.
