= Depleted uranium =

Uranium with lower content of U235

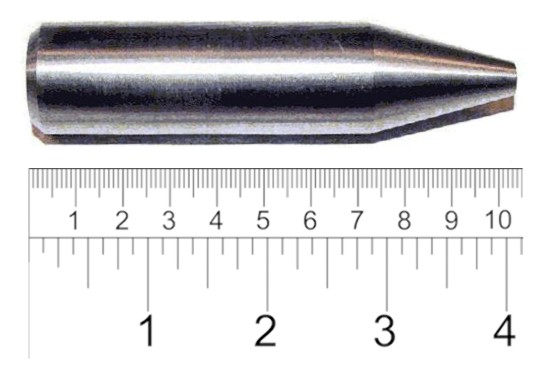
The DU penetrator of a 30 mm round from the GAU-8 Avenger

Depleted uranium (DU), also referred to in the past as Q-metal, depletalloy, or D-38_{,} is uranium with a lower content of the fissile isotope ^{235}U than natural uranium. The less radioactive and non-fissile ^{238}U is the main component of depleted uranium. It is antonymous to "enriched uranium".

Uranium is notable for the extremely high density of its metallic form: at 19.1 grams per cubic centimetre (0.69 lb/cu in), uranium is 68.4% denser than lead. Because depleted uranium has roughly the same density as natural uranium but far less radioactivity, it is desirable for applications that demand high mass without added radiation hazards. Civilian uses include counterweights in aircraft, radiation shielding in medical radiation therapy, research and industrial radiography equipment, and containers for transporting radioactive materials. Military uses include armor plating and armor-piercing projectiles.

The use of DU in ammunitions is controversial because of concerns about potential long-term health effects. Normal functioning of the kidney, brain, liver, heart, and numerous other systems can be affected by exposure to uranium, a toxic metal. It is only weakly radioactive because of the long radioactive half-life of ^{238}U (4.468 billion years) and the low amounts of ^{234}U (half-life about 246,000 years) and ^{235}U (half-life 700 million years). The biological half-life (the average time it takes for the human body to eliminate half the amount in the body) for uranium is about 15 days. The aerosol or spallation frangible powder produced by impact and combustion of depleted uranium munitions (or armour) can potentially contaminate wide areas around the impact sites, leading to possible inhalation by human beings.

The actual level of acute and chronic toxicity of DU is also controversial. Several studies using cultured cells and laboratory rodents suggest the possibility of leukemogenic, genetic, reproductive, and neurological effects from chronic exposure. A 2005 epidemiology review concluded "In aggregate the human epidemiological evidence is consistent with increased risk of birth defects in offspring of persons exposed to DU." A 2021 study concluded that DU from exploding munitions did not lead to Gulf War illness in American veterans deployed in the Gulf War. A 2011 study found elevated levels of uranium in soil and hair samples from Fallujah, Iraq, but it was from slightly enriched uranium instead of DU.

== Definition ==
Natural uranium contains about 0.72% ^{235}U. Depleted uranium has lower mass fractions—up to three times less—of ^{235}U and ^{234}U than natural uranium. Since ^{238}U has a much longer half-life than the lighter isotopes, DU is about 40% less radioactive than natural uranium. Most of the alpha radiation comes from ^{238}U and ^{234}U (Note: In natural uranium, about 49% of the radiation comes from ^{238}U, 49% from ^{234}U, and 2% from ^{235}U. In depleted uranium the amounts of ^{235}U and ^{234}U are both reduced, but there is still much more radiation from the ^{234}U than from the ^{235}U.) whereas beta radiation comes from decay products ^{234}Th and ^{234}Pa that are formed within a few weeks.

The United States Nuclear Regulatory Commission (NRC) defines depleted uranium as uranium with a percentage of the ^{235}U isotope that is less than 0.711% by weight (see 10 CFR 40.4). The military specifications designate that the DU used by the U.S. Department of Defense (DoD) contain less than 0.3% ^{235}U. In actuality, the DoD uses only DU that contains approximately 0.2% ^{235}U.

== History ==
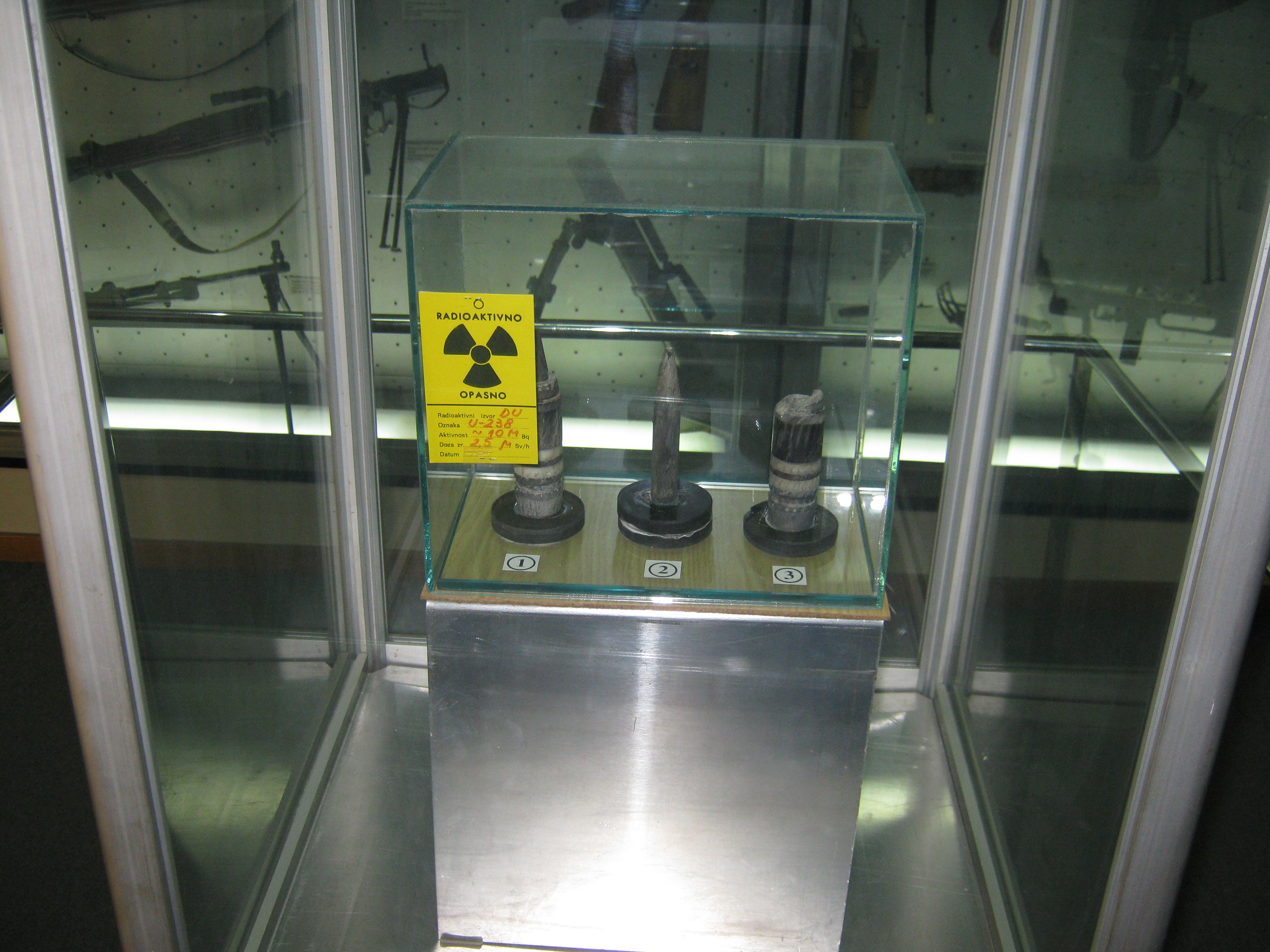
U-238 DU rounds on display

Enriched uranium was first manufactured in the early 1940s when the United States and the United Kingdom began their nuclear weapons programs. Later in the decade, France and the Soviet Union began their nuclear weapons and nuclear power programs. Depleted uranium was originally stored as an unusable waste product (uranium hexafluoride) in the hope that improved enrichment processes could extract additional quantities of the fissionable ^{235}U isotope. This re-enrichment recovery of the residual uranium-235 is now in practice in some parts of the world; e.g. in 1996 over 6,000 tonnes (6,600 short tons) were upgraded in a Russian plant.

In the 1970s, the Pentagon reported that the Soviet military had developed armor plating for Warsaw Pact tanks that NATO ammunition could not penetrate. The Pentagon began searching for materials to make denser armor-piercing projectiles. After testing various metals, ordnance researchers settled on depleted uranium.

The US and NATO militaries used DU penetrator rounds in the 1991 Gulf War, the Bosnia war, bombing of Serbia, the 2003 invasion of Iraq, and 2015 airstrikes on ISIS in Syria. It is estimated that between 315 and 350 short tons (286 and 318 t) of DU were used in the 1991 Gulf War.

== Production ==
Most depleted uranium arises as a by-product of the production of enriched uranium for use as fuel in nuclear reactors and in the manufacture of nuclear weapons. Enrichment processes generate uranium with a higher-than-natural concentration of lower-mass-number uranium isotopes (in particular ^{235}U, which is the uranium isotope supporting the fission chain reaction) with the bulk of the feed ending up as depleted uranium.

Natural uranium metal contains about 0.71% ^{235}U, 99.28% ^{238}U, and about 0.0054% ^{234}U. The production of enriched uranium using isotope separation creates depleted uranium containing only 0.2% to 0.4% ^{235}U. Because natural uranium begins with such a low percentage of ^{235}U, enrichment produces large quantities of depleted uranium. For example, producing 1 kilogram (2.2 lb) of 5% enriched uranium requires 11.8 kilograms (26 lb) of natural uranium, and leaves about 10.8 kilograms (24 lb) of depleted uranium having only 0.3% ^{235}U.

Depleted uranium is further produced by recycling spent nuclear fuel, in which case it contains traces of neptunium and plutonium. These quantities are so small that they are not considered to be of serious radiological significance by the European Committee on Radiation Risk. DU from nuclear reprocessing has different isotopic ratios from enrichment-by-product DU, from which it can be distinguished by the presence of ^{236}U.

The only known natural source of uranium with a ^{235}U content significantly different from 0.71% is found in the natural nuclear fission reactor at Oklo, Gabon. It can be "fingerprinted" as different in origin from manmade depleted uranium by the ^{234}U content, which is 55 ppm in uranium from the Oklo Mine as well as all other natural sources, but will be lower in depleted uranium in accordance with the degree of depletion.

== Storage ==
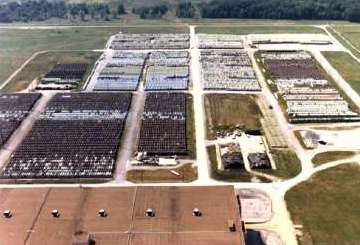
A typical DUF_{6} cylinder storage yard

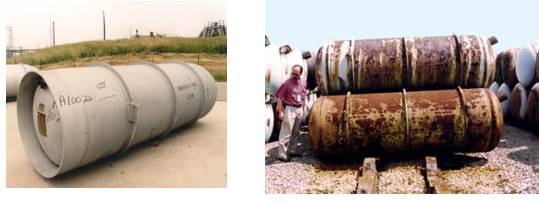
DUF_{6} cylinders: painted (left) and corroded (right)

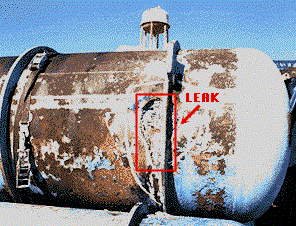
Uranium hexafluoride tank leaking

About 95% of the depleted uranium produced until now is stored as uranium hexafluoride, or (D)UF_{6}, in steel cylinders in open air storage yards close to enrichment plants. Each cylinder typically holds up to 12.7 tonnes (14.0 short tons) of UF_{6}. In the U.S. 560,000 tonnes (620,000 short tons) of depleted UF_{6} had accumulated by 1993. In 2008, 686,500 tonnes (756,700 short tons) in 57,122 storage cylinders were located near Portsmouth, Ohio; Oak Ridge, Tennessee; and Paducah, Kentucky.

The storage of (D)UF_{6} presents environmental, health, and safety risks because of its chemical instability. When UF_{6} is exposed to water vapor in the air, it reacts with the moisture to produce UO_{2}F_{2} (uranyl fluoride), a solid, and HF (hydrogen fluoride), a gas, both of which are highly soluble and toxic. The uranyl fluoride solid acts to plug the leak, limiting further escape of depleted UF_{6}. Release of the hydrogen fluoride gas to the atmosphere is also slowed by the plug formation. Like any other uranium compound, uranyl fluoride is radioactive, and precautions should be taken. Whether ingested, inhaled, or absorbed through the skin, it is corrosive and may harm internal organs, potentially resulting in death. Effects of exposure may be delayed.

The U.S. government has been converting depleted UF_{6} to solid uranium oxides for use or disposal. Such disposal of the entire DUF_{6} inventory could cost anywhere from US$15 million to US$450 million.

World depleted-uranium inventory (1999)
Country	Organization	Estimated DU stocks tonnes (short tons)	Reported
United States	DOE	480,000 (530,000)	2002
Russia	Rosatom	460,000 (510,000)	1996
France	Areva NC	190,000 (210,000)	2001
United Kingdom	BNFL	30,000 (33,000)	2001
United Kingdom; Germany; Netherlands	URENCO	16,000 (18,000)	1999
Japan	JNFL	10,000 (11,000)	2001
China	CNNC	2,000 (2,200)	2000
South Korea	KAERI	200 (220)	2002
South Africa	NECSA	73 (80)	2001
Singapore	DSO National Laboratories	60 (66)	2007
Total		1,188,273 (1,309,847)	2008

== Military applications ==
Depleted uranium is very dense; at 19,050 kg/m^{3}, it is 1.67 times as dense as lead, only slightly less dense than tungsten and gold, and only 16% less than osmium and iridium, which are the densest known substances under standard (i.e., Earth-surface) pressures. Consequently, a DU projectile of given mass has a smaller diameter than an equivalent lead projectile with the same kinetic energy, with less aerodynamic drag and deeper penetration because of a higher pressure at point of impact. DU projectiles are inherently incendiary because they become pyrophoric upon impact with the target.

=== Armor plate ===
Because of its high density, depleted uranium can also be used in tank armor, sandwiched between sheets of steel armor plate. For instance, some late-production M1A1 and M1A2 Abrams tanks built after 1998 have DU modules integrated into their Chobham armor, as part of the armor plating in the front of the turret, and there is a program to upgrade older tanks.

=== Nuclear weapons ===
Depleted uranium can be used as a tamper, or neutron reflector, in fission bombs. A high density tamper like DU makes for a longer-lasting, more energetic, and more efficient explosion.

=== Ammunition ===
Most military use of depleted uranium has been as 30 mm ordnance, primarily the 30 mm PGU-14/B armor-piercing incendiary round from the GAU-8 Avenger cannon of the A-10 Thunderbolt II used by the United States Air Force. 25 mm DU rounds have been used in the M242 gun mounted on the U.S. Army's Bradley Fighting Vehicle and the Marine Corps's LAV-25.

The U.S. Marine Corps uses DU in the 25 mm PGU-20 round fired by the GAU-12 Equalizer cannon of the AV-8B Harrier, and in the 20 mm M197 gun mounted on AH-1 Cobra helicopter gunships. The United States Navy's Phalanx CIWS's M61 Vulcan Gatling gun used 20 mm armor-piercing penetrator rounds with discarding plastic sabots and a core made using depleted uranium, however they later changed to using tungsten penetrators.

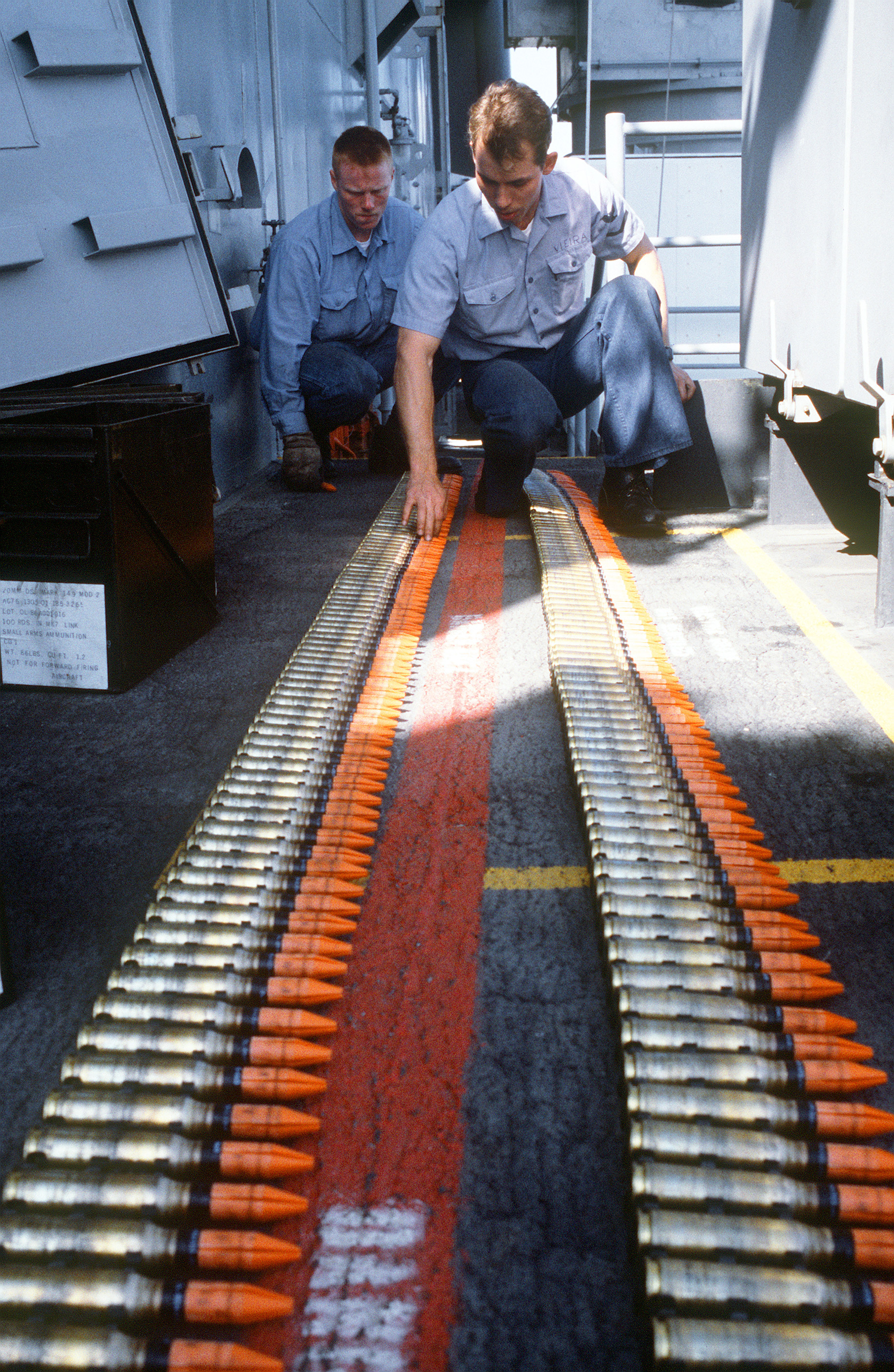
Mark 149 Mod 2 20mm depleted uranium ammunition for the Phalanx CIWS aboard the battleship USS Missouri, November 1987.

Another use of depleted uranium is in kinetic energy penetrators, anti-armor rounds such as the 120 mm sabot rounds fired from the British Challenger 1 and Challenger 2, as well as the American M1A1 and M1A2 Abrams. Kinetic energy penetrator rounds consist of a long, relatively thin penetrator surrounded by a discarding sabot. Staballoys are metal alloys of depleted uranium with a very small proportion of other metals, usually titanium or molybdenum. One formulation has a composition of 99.25% by mass of depleted uranium and 0.75% by mass of titanium. Staballoys are approximately 1.67 times as dense as lead and are designed for use in kinetic energy penetrator armor-piercing ammunition. The US Army uses DU in an alloy with around 3.5% titanium.

Depleted uranium is favored for the penetrator because it is self-sharpening and flammable. On impact with a hard target, such as an armored vehicle, the tip of the projectile will be "mushroomed", while the back of the projectile is still a rigid solid. This leads to adiabatic shearing, and together with the spin of the projectile results in a shedding of the mushroomed plastic phase in such a way that it forms a new sharp tip. This shedding of the mushroomed tip improves penetration properties compared to the complete dispersal that takes place with tungsten penetrators, therefore DU penetrators are 20% more effective than tungsten rounds. The impact and subsequent release of heat energy causes it to ignite when in contact with oxygen. When a DU penetrator reaches the interior of an armored vehicle, it catches fire, often igniting ammunition and fuel and possibly causing the vehicle to explode. DU is used by the U.S. Army in 120 mm or 105 mm cannons employed on the M1 Abrams tank.

The DU content in various ammunition is 180 grams (6.3 oz) in 20 mm, 200 grams (7.1 oz) in 25 mm, 280 grams (9.9 oz) in 30 mm, 3.5 kilograms (7.7 lb) in 105 mm, and 4.5 kilograms (9.9 lb) in 120 mm penetrators. DU was used during the mid-1990s in the U.S. to make hand grenades, and land mines, but those applications have been discontinued, according to Alliant Techsystems. The US Navy used DU in its 20 mm Phalanx CIWS guns, but switched in the late 1990s to armor-piercing tungsten.

Only the US and the UK have acknowledged using DU weapons. The Soviet Union and Russia have used DU weaponry since the 3BM-32 Vant, designed for the 125 mm tank cannons. In 2018, TASS reported that Russia was arming some of its T-80 models with 3BM60 Svinets-2 DU rounds. 782,414 DU rounds were fired during the 1991 war in Iraq, mostly by US forces. In a three-week period of conflict in Iraq during 2003, it was estimated that between 1,000 and 2,000 tonnes of depleted uranium munitions were used. More than 300,000 DU rounds were fired during the 2003 war, the vast majority by US troops. The International Atomic Energy Agency (IAEA) estimates that between 170 and 1,700 tonnes of depleted uranium was dropped in Iraq by the US military since 2003, whereas the UK reported firing 1.9 tonnes of depleted uranium weapons in Iraq

In March 2023, the UK government confirmed it was sending DU rounds to Ukraine along with its Challenger 2 tanks with its 120mm ammunition during the Russian invasion.

=== Legal status in weapons ===
In 1996, the International Court of Justice (ICJ) gave an advisory opinion on the "legality of the threat or use of nuclear weapons". This made it clear, in paragraphs 54–56, that international law on poisonous weapons—the Second Hague Declaration of 29 July 1899, Hague Convention IV of 18 October 1907 and the Geneva Protocol of 17 June 1925—did not cover nuclear weapons, because their prime or exclusive use was not to poison or asphyxiate. This ICJ opinion was about nuclear weapons, but the sentence "The terms have been understood, in the practice of States, in their ordinary sense as covering weapons whose prime, or even exclusive, effect is to poison or asphyxiate," also removes depleted uranium weaponry from coverage by the same treaties as their primary use is not to poison or asphyxiate, but to destroy materiel and kill soldiers through kinetic energy.

The Sub-Commission on Prevention of Discrimination and Protection of Minorities of the United Nations Human Rights Commission, passed two motions—the first in 1996 and the second in 1997. They listed weapons of mass destruction, or weapons with indiscriminate effect, or of a nature to cause superfluous injury or unnecessary suffering and urged all states to curb the production and the spread of such weapons. Included in the list was weaponry containing depleted uranium. The committee authorized a working paper, in the context of human rights and humanitarian norms, of the weapons.

The requested UN working paper was delivered in 2002 by Y. K. J. Yeung Sik Yuen in accordance with Sub-Commission on the Promotion and Protection of Human Rights resolution 2001/36. He argues that the use of DU in weapons, along with the other weapons listed by the Sub‑Commission, may breach one or more of the following treaties: the Universal Declaration of Human Rights, the Charter of the United Nations, the Genocide Convention, the United Nations Convention Against Torture, the Geneva Conventions including Protocol I, the Convention on Conventional Weapons of 1980, and the Chemical Weapons Convention. Yeung Sik Yuen writes in Paragraph 133 under the title "Legal compliance of weapons containing DU as a new weapon":

Annex II to the Convention on the Physical Protection of Nuclear Material 1980 (which became operative on 8 February 1997) classifies DU as a category II nuclear material. Storage and transport rules are set down for that category which indicates that DU is considered sufficiently "hot" and dangerous to warrant these protections. But since weapons containing DU are relatively new weapons no treaty exists yet to regulate, limit or prohibit its use. The legality or illegality of DU weapons must therefore be tested by recourse to the general rules governing the use of weapons under humanitarian and human rights law which have already been analysed in Part I of this paper, and more particularly at paragraph 35 which states that parties to Protocol I to the Geneva Conventions of 1949 have an obligation to ascertain that new weapons do not violate the laws and customs of war or any other international law. As mentioned, the International Court of Justice considers this rule binding customary humanitarian law.

Louise Arbour, chief prosecutor for the International Criminal Tribunal for the Former Yugoslavia led a committee of staff lawyers to investigate possible treaty prohibitions against the use of DU in weapons. Their findings were that:

There is no specific treaty ban on the use of DU projectiles. There is a developing scientific debate and concern expressed regarding the impact of the use of such projectiles and it is possible that, in future, there will be a consensus view in international legal circles that use of such projectiles violate general principles of the law applicable to use of weapons in armed conflict. No such consensus exists at present.

According to the United Nations Institute for Disarmament Research, depleted uranium does not meet the legal definitions of nuclear, radiological, toxin, chemical, poison or incendiary weapons, as far as DU ammunition is not designed nor intended to kill or wound by its chemical or radiological effects.

=== Requests for a moratorium on military use ===
A number of anti-war activists specializing in international humanitarian law have questioned the legality of the continued use of depleted uranium weapons, highlighting that the effects may breach the principle of distinction (between civilians and military personnel). Some states and the International Coalition to Ban Uranium Weapons, a coalition of more than 155 non-governmental organizations, have asked for a ban on the production and military use of depleted uranium weapons.

The European Parliament has repeatedly passed resolutions requesting an immediate moratorium on the further use of depleted uranium ammunition, but France and Britain – the only European states that are permanent members of the United Nations Security Council—have consistently rejected calls for a ban, maintaining that its use continues to be legal, and that the health risks are unsubstantiated.

In 2007, France, Britain, the Netherlands, and the Czech Republic voted against a United Nations General Assembly resolution to hold a debate in 2009 about the effects of the use of armaments and ammunitions containing depleted uranium. All other European Union nations voted in favour or abstained. The ambassador from the Netherlands explained his negative vote as being due to the reference in the preamble to the resolution "to potential harmful effects of the use of depleted uranium munitions on human health and the environment [which] cannot, in our view, be supported by conclusive scientific studies conducted by relevant international organizations." None of the other permanent members of the United Nations Security Council supported the resolution as China was absent for the vote, Russia abstained and the United States voted against the resolution.

In September 2008, and in response to the 2007 General Assembly resolution, the UN Secretary General published the views of 15 states alongside those of the International Atomic Energy Agency (IAEA) and World Health Organization (WHO). The IAEA and WHO evidence differed little from previous statements on the issue. The report was largely split between states concerned about depleted uranium's use, such as Finland, Cuba, Japan, Serbia, Argentina, and predominantly NATO members, who do not consider the use of depleted uranium munitions problematic.

In December 2008, 141 states supported a resolution requesting that three UN agencies: United Nations Environment Programme (UNEP), WHO and IAEA update their research on the impact of uranium munitions by late 2010—to coincide with the General Assembly's 65th Session, four voted against, 34 abstained and 13 were absent. As before Britain and France voted against the resolution. All other European Union nations voted in favour or abstained: the Netherlands, which voted against a resolution in 2007, voted in favour, as did Finland and Norway, both of which had abstained in 2007, while the Czech Republic, which voted against the resolution in 2007, abstained. The two other states that voted against the resolution were Israel and the United States (both of which voted against in 2007), while as before China was absent for the vote, and Russia abstained.

In June 2009, Belgium became the first country in the world to ban: "inert ammunition and armour that contains depleted uranium or any other industrially manufactured uranium." The move followed a unanimous parliamentary vote on the issue on 22 March 2007. The text of the 2007 law allowed for two years to pass until it came into force. In April 2009, the Belgian Senate voted unanimously to restrict investments by Belgian banks into the manufacturers of depleted uranium weapons.

In September 2009, the Latin American Parliament passed a resolution calling for a regional moratorium on the use, production and procurement of uranium weapons. It also called on the Parlatino's members to work towards an international uranium weapons treaty.

In November 2010 the Irish Senate passed a bill seeking to outlaw depleted uranium weapons, but it lapsed before approval by the Dáil.

In December 2010, 148 states supported a United Nations' General Assembly resolution calling for the states that use depleted uranium weapons in conflict to reveal where the weapons have been fired when asked to do so by the country upon whose territory they have been used.

In April 2011, the Congress of Costa Rica passed a law prohibiting uranium weapons in its territories, becoming the second country in the world to do so.

In December 2012, 155 states supported a United Nations' General Assembly resolution that recalled that, because of the ongoing uncertainties over the long-term environmental impacts of depleted uranium identified by the United Nations Environment Programme, states should adopt a precautionary approach to its use.

In December 2014, 150 states supported a United Nations' General Assembly resolution encouraging states to provide assistance to states affected by the use of depleted uranium weapons, in particular in identifying and managing contaminated sites and material. In contrast to the previous biennial resolutions, Germany moved to an abstention from supporting to the resolutions. Prior to the vote, in a report to the United Nations Secretary General requested by 2012's resolution published in June 2014, Iraq had called for a global treaty ban on depleted uranium weapons.

== Civilian applications ==
Depleted uranium has a very high density and is primarily used as shielding material for other radioactive material, and as ballast. Examples include sailboat keels, as counterweights and as shielding in industrial radiography cameras.

=== Energy ===
Most civilian nuclear reactors, as well as all naval reactors, require fuel containing concentrated ^{235}U, and production of that fuel generates depleted uranium as residue. Some power-generating reactors design are able to use unenriched fuel, for example the pressurized heavy-water reactors such as the CANDU design. However, as of 2013, about 10% of those built use that technology. Travelling wave reactors are a proposed type of reactor which can use depleted uranium as fuel.

=== Radiation shielding ===
Depleted uranium is the best radiation shielding by weight, due to the high atomic weight of the uranium atoms; materials are more able to block radioactivity the higher their atomic weight, and uranium is one of the heaviest natural elements. Lead, the heaviest stable element, is the most common low-cost alternative, but a lead shield needs to be about three times as thick as a DU shield to provide the equivalent protection. Uranium also has by far a higher melting point 2,070 °F (1,130 °C), and its tensile strength is similar to that of steel.

Industrial radiography cameras include a very high activity gamma radiation source (typically Ir-192 with an activity above 10 TBq). Depleted uranium is often used in the cameras as a shield to protect individuals from the gamma source. Typically, the uranium shield is supported and enclosed in polyurethane foam for thermal, mechanical and oxidation protection.

=== Coloring in consumer products ===
Consumer product uses have included incorporation into dental porcelain, used for false teeth to simulate the fluorescence of natural teeth, and uranium-bearing reagents used in chemistry laboratories (e.g. uranyl acetate, used in analytical chemistry and as a stain in electron microscopy). Uranium (both depleted uranium and natural uranium) was widely used as a coloring matter for porcelain and glass in the 19th and early-to-mid-20th century. The practice was largely discontinued in the late 20th century. In 1999, concentrations of 10% depleted uranium were being used in "jaune no.17" a yellow enamel powder that was being produced in France by Cristallerie de Saint-Paul, a manufacturer of enamel pigments. The depleted uranium used in the powder was sold by Cogéma's Pierrelatte facility. In February 2000, Cogema discontinued the sale of depleted uranium to producers of enamel and glass.

=== Trim weights in aircraft ===
Aircraft that contain depleted uranium trim weights for stabilizing wings and control surfaces (such as the Boeing 747–100) may contain between 652 and 1,059 pounds (296 and 480 kg) of DU. This application is controversial because the DU might enter the environment if the aircraft crashes. The metal can also oxidize to a fine powder in a fire. Its use has been phased out in many newer aircraft. Boeing and McDonnell-Douglas discontinued using DU counterweights in the 1980s. Depleted uranium was released during the crash of El Al Flight 1862 on 4 October 1992, in which 152 kilograms (335 lb) was lost, but a case study concluded that there was no evidence to link depleted uranium from the plane to any health problems. DU counterweights manufactured with cadmium plating are considered non-hazardous as long as the plating is intact.

=== US NRC general license ===
US Nuclear Regulatory Commission regulations at 10 CFR 40.25 establish a general license for the use of depleted uranium contained in industrial products or devices for mass-volume applications. This general license allows anyone to possess or use depleted uranium for authorized purposes. Generally, a registration form is required, along with a commitment to not abandon the material. Agreement states may have similar, or more stringent, regulations.

=== Sailboat keel ===
Pen Duick VI, a boat designed by André Mauric and used for racing, was equipped with a keel of depleted uranium. The benefit is that, because of the very high density of uranium, the keel could be thinner for a given weight, and so have less resistance than a normal keel. It was later replaced by a standard lead keel.

=== Sampling calorimeters for detectors in high-energy particle physics ===
Depleted uranium has been used in a number of sampling calorimeters (such as in the D0 and ZEUS detectors) because of its high density and natural radioactivity.

== Health considerations ==
Normal functioning of the kidney, brain, liver, heart, and numerous other systems can be affected by uranium exposure because uranium is a toxic metal, although less toxic than other heavy metals, such as arsenic and mercury. It is weakly radioactive and is 'persistently' so because of its very long half-life. The Agency for Toxic Substances and Disease Registry states that: "to be exposed to radiation from uranium, you have to eat, drink, or breathe it, or get it on your skin." If DU particles do enter an individual, the type of danger presented—toxic vs. radiological—and the organ most likely to be affected depend on the solubility of the particles.

In military conflicts involving DU munitions, the major concern is inhalation of DU particles in aerosols arising from the impacts of DU-enhanced projectiles with their targets. When depleted uranium munitions penetrate armor or burn, they create depleted uranium oxides in the form of dust that can be inhaled or contaminate wounds. The Institute of Nuclear Technology-Radiation Protection of Attiki, Greece, has noted that "the aerosol produced during impact and combustion of depleted uranium munitions can potentially contaminate wide areas around the impact sites or can be inhaled by civilians and military personnel". The use of DU in incendiary ammunition is controversial because of potential adverse health effects and its release into the environment.

The U.S. Department of Defense claims that no human cancer of any type has been seen as a result of exposure to either natural or depleted uranium. Militaries have long had risk-reduction procedures for their troops to follow, and studies are in consistent agreement that veterans who used DU-enhanced munitions have not suffered, so far, from an increased risk of cancer (see the Gulf War and Balkans sections below). The effects of DU on civilian populations are, however, a topic of intense and ongoing controversy.

As early as 1997, British Army doctors warned the Ministry of Defence that exposure to depleted uranium increased the risk of developing lung, lymph and brain cancer, and recommended a series of safety precautions. According to a report issued summarizing the advice of the doctors, "Inhalation of insoluble uranium dioxide dust will lead to accumulation in the lungs with very slow clearance—if any. ... Although chemical toxicity is low, there may be localised radiation damage of the lung leading to cancer." The report warns that "All personnel ... should be aware that uranium dust inhalation carries a long-term risk ... [the dust] has been shown to increase the risks of developing lung, lymph and brain cancers."

In 2003, the Royal Society called, again, for urgent attention to be paid to the possible health and environmental impact of depleted uranium, and added its backing to the United Nations Environment Programme's call for a scientific assessment of sites struck with depleted uranium. (Note: Moszynski 2003. The article quotes Professor Brian Spratt of the Royal Society's DU working group: "It is highly unsatisfactory to deploy a large amount of material that is weakly radioactive and chemically toxic without knowing how much soldiers and civilians have been exposed to.") In early 2004, the UK Pensions Appeal Tribunal Service attributed birth defect claims from a February 1991 Gulf War combat veteran to depleted uranium poisoning. A 2005 epidemiology review concluded: "In aggregate the human epidemiological evidence is consistent with increased risk of birth defects in offspring of persons exposed to DU." Studies using cultured cells and laboratory rodents continue to suggest the possibility of leukemogenic, genetic, reproductive, and neurological effects from chronic exposure.

=== Chemical toxicity ===
The chemical toxicity of depleted uranium is identical to that of natural uranium and about a million times greater in vivo than DU's radiological hazard, with the kidney considered to be the main target organ. Health effects of DU are determined by factors such as the extent of exposure and whether it was internal or external. Three main pathways exist by which internalization of uranium may occur: inhalation, ingestion, and embedded fragments or shrapnel contamination. Properties such as phase (e.g. particulate or gaseous), oxidation state (e.g. metallic or ceramic), and the solubility of uranium and its compounds influence their absorption, distribution, translocation, elimination and the resulting toxicity. For example, metallic uranium is less toxic compared to hexavalent uranium(VI) uranyl compounds such as uranium trioxide (UO_{3}).

Compilation of 2004 review information regarding uranium toxicity
Body system	Human studies	Animal studies	In vitro
Renal	Elevated levels of protein excretion, urinary catalase and diuresis	Damage to proximal convoluted tubules, necrotic cells cast from tubular epithelium, glomerular changes	No studies
Brain/CNS	Decreased performance on neurocognitive tests	Acute cholinergic toxicity; Dose-dependent accumulation in cortex, midbrain, and vermis; Electrophysiological changes in hippocampus	No studies
DNA	Increased reports of cancers	Increased DNA adducts, single strand breaks, and mutagenisis via uranium binding to DNA, with the increased potential for tumor formation	Binucleated cells with micronuclei, Inhibition of cell cycle kinetics and proliferation; Sister chromatid induction, tumorigenic phenotype
Bone/muscle	No studies	Inhibition of periodontal bone formation; and alveolar wound healing	No studies
Reproductive	Uranium miners have more first born female children	Moderate to severe focal tubular atrophy; vacuolization of Leydig cells	No studies
Lungs/respiratory	No adverse health effects reported	Severe nasal congestion and hemorrhage, lung lesions and fibrosis, edema and swelling, lung cancer	No studies
Gastrointestinal	Vomiting, diarrhea, albuminuria	No Studies	N/A
Liver	No effects seen at exposure dose	Fatty livers, focal necrosis	No studies
Skin	No exposure assessment data available	Swollen vacuolated epidermal cells, damage to hair follicles and sebaceous glands	No studies
Tissues surrounding embedded DU fragments	Elevated uranium urine concentrations	Elevated uranium urine concentrations, perturbations in biochemical and neuropsychological testing	No studies
Immune system	Chronic fatigue, rash, ear and eye infections, hair and weight loss, cough. May be due to combined chemical exposure rather than DU alone	No studies	No studies
Eyes	No studies	Conjunctivitis, irritation inflammation, edema, ulceration of conjunctival sacs	No studies
Blood	No studies	Decrease in RBC count and hemoglobin concentration	No studies
Cardiovascular	Myocarditis resulting from the uranium ingestion, which ended 6 months after ingestion	No effects	No studies

Uranium is pyrophoric when finely divided. It will corrode under the influence of air and water producing insoluble uranium(IV) and soluble uranium(VI) salts. Soluble uranium salts are toxic. Uranium slowly accumulates in several organs, such as the liver, spleen, and kidneys. The World Health Organization has established a daily "tolerated intake" of soluble uranium salts for the general public of 0.5 micrograms per kilogram (3.5×10^{−6} gr/lb) body weight, or 35 micrograms (0.00054 gr) for a 70 kilograms (150 lb) adult.

Epidemiological studies and toxicological tests on laboratory animals point to it as being immunotoxic, teratogenic, neurotoxic, with carcinogenic and leukemogenic potential. A 2005 report by epidemiologists concluded: "the human epidemiological evidence is consistent with increased risk of birth defects in offspring of persons exposed to DU."

Early studies of depleted uranium aerosol exposure assumed that uranium combustion product particles would quickly settle out of the air and thus could not affect populations more than a few kilometers from target areas, and that such particles, if inhaled, would remain undissolved in the lung for a great length of time and thus could be detected in urine. Violently burning uranium droplets produce a gaseous vapor comprising about half of the uranium in their original mass. Uranyl ion contamination in uranium oxides has been detected in the residue of DU munitions fires.

Approximately 90 micrograms (0.0014 gr) of natural uranium, on average, exist in the human body as a result of normal intake of water, food and air. Most is in the skeleton. The biochemistry of depleted uranium is the same as natural uranium.

=== Radiological hazards ===
Available evidence suggests that the radiation risk is small relative to the chemical hazard. The primary radiation from pure depleted uranium is due to alpha particles, which do not travel far through air and do not penetrate clothing and skin. However, as uranium-238 decays into its daughter nuclei from its decay series, pure depleted uranium will generate thorium-234 (half-life of ~24 days) followed by protactinium-234 (half life of ~7 hours), which emit more penetrating beta particles at almost the same rate as the uranium emits alpha particles. Total activity then settles to a plateau as the more stable isotope uranium-234 accumulates. A quasi-steady state of roughly 3 times the initial activity is reached within months. (Note: The amounts of both thorium-234 and protactinium-234 after the first days and for millions of years thereafter will be approximately proportional to 1–2^{−t / (24 days)}. See Krane, Kenneth S. (1988). Introductory Nuclear Physics. John Wiley & Sons. ISBN 978-0-471-80553-3.) Once an equilibrium level of uranium-234 (and its 11 shorter-lived daughter nuclei) has built up after about a million years there will be another radiation plateau at about 14 times the initial activity, finally reaching levels comparable to natural uranium.

According to the World Health Organization, radiation dose from DU would be about 60% of that from purified natural uranium with the same mass; the radiological dangers are lower due to its longer half-life and the removal of the more radioactive isotopes.

Surveying the veteran-related evidence pertaining to the Gulf War, a 2001 editorial in the BMJ concluded that it was not possible to justify claims of radiation-induced lung cancer and leukaemia in veterans of that conflict. While agreeing with the editorial's conclusion, a reply noted that its finding in the negative was guaranteed, given that "global dose estimates or results of mathematical modelling are too inaccurate to be used as dose values for an individual veteran", and that, as of April 2001, no practical method of measuring the expected small doses that each individual veteran would receive had been suggested. (Note: Mould 2001. Mould's suggestion was electron paramagnetic resonance dosimetry using tooth enamel. He also wrote that the US National Institute of Standards and Technology was able, using this method, to measure doses as low as 20 mSv, and that, if it were asked to, the NIST would be able to get involved, meaning at least one centre could help undertake a screening programme for veterans.) The author of the reply, a radiation scientist, went on to suggest a method that had been used several times before, including after the 1986 Chernobyl accident. Despite the widespread use of DU in the Iraq War, at least a year after the conflict began, testing of UK troops was still only in the discussion phase. (Note: Greenberg et al. 2004, which found that perhaps a quarter of all UK troops would have been interested in undergoing DU-related monitoring, although "the desire for DU screening is more closely linked to current health status rather than plausible exposure to DU." Confusingly, Moszynski 2003 reports that "testing is now available to all troops that served in Iraq", and does not say if this is testing à la Mould.)

The Royal Society Working Group on the Health Hazards of Depleted Uranium Munitions (RSDUWG) concluded in 2002 that there were "very low" health risks associated with the use of depleted uranium, though it also ventured that, "[i]n extreme conditions and under worst-case assumptions" lung and kidney damage could occur, and that in "worst-case scenarios high local levels of uranium could occur in food or water that could have adverse effects on the kidney". In 2003, the Royal Society issued another urgent call to investigate the actual health and environmental impact of depleted uranium. The same year, a cohort study of Gulf War veterans found no elevated risks of cancer generally, nor of any specific cancers in particular, though recommended follow up studies.

=== Studies indicating negligible effects ===
Studies in 2005 and earlier have concluded that DU ammunition has no measurable detrimental health effects.

A 1999 literature review conducted by the Rand Corporation stated: "No evidence is documented in the literature of cancer or any other negative health effect related to the radiation received from exposure to depleted or natural uranium, whether inhaled or ingested, even at very high doses," and a RAND report authored by the U.S. Defense department undersecretary charged with evaluating DU hazards considered the debate to be more political than scientific.

A 2001 oncology study concluded that "the present scientific consensus is that DU exposure to humans, in locations where DU ammunition was deployed, is very unlikely to give rise to cancer induction". Former NATO Secretary General Lord Robertson stated in 2001 that "the existing medical consensus is clear. The hazard from depleted uranium is both very limited, and limited to very specific circumstances".

A 2002 study from the Australian defense ministry concluded that "there has been no established increase in mortality or morbidity in workers exposed to uranium in uranium processing industries... studies of Gulf War veterans show that, in those who have retained fragments of depleted uranium following combat related injury, it has been possible to detect elevated urinary uranium levels, but no kidney toxicity or other adverse health effects related to depleted uranium after a decade of follow-up." Pier Roberto Danesi, then-director of the International Atomic Energy Agency (IAEA) Seibersdorf +Laboratory, stated in 2002 that "There is a consensus now that DU does not represent a health threat".

The IAEA reported in 2003 that, "based on credible scientific evidence, there is no proven link between DU exposure and increases in human cancers or other significant health or environmental impacts," although "Like other heavy metals, DU is potentially poisonous. In sufficient amounts, if DU is ingested or inhaled it can be harmful because of its chemical toxicity. High concentration could cause kidney damage." The IAEA concluded that, while depleted uranium is a potential carcinogen, there is no evidence that it has been carcinogenic in humans.

A 2005 study by the U.S. Sandia National Laboratories' Al Marshall used mathematical models to analyze potential health effects associated with accidental exposure to depleted uranium during the 1991 Gulf War. Marshall's study concluded that the reports of cancer risks from DU exposure are not supported by his analysis nor by veteran medical statistics. Marshall also examined possible genetic effects due to radiation from depleted uranium. Chemical effects, including potential reproductive issues, associated with depleted uranium exposure were discussed in some detail in a subsequent journal paper.

=== Gulf War syndrome and soldier complaints ===
The approximate area and major clashes in which DU bullets and rounds were used in the Gulf War

Birth defect statistics in Basra, Iraq.

Since 1991, the year the Gulf War ended, veterans and their families voiced concern about subsequent health problems. In 1999, an assessment of the first 1,000 veterans involved in the Ministry of Defence's Gulf War medical assessment programme found "no evidence" of a single illness, physical or mental, that would explain the pattern of symptoms observed in the group. In 1999, MEDACT petitioned for the WHO to conduct an investigation into illnesses in veterans and Iraqi civilians. A major 2006 review of peer-reviewed literature by a US Institute of Medicine (IOM) committee concluded that, "[b]ecause the symptoms vary greatly among individuals", they do not point to a syndrome unique to Gulf War veterans, though their report conceded that the lack of objective pre-deployment health data meant definitive conclusions were effectively impossible. (Note: Charatan 2006. The quote is of Lynn Goldman, who chaired the IOM committee that carried out the review.)

Simon Wessely praised the IOM's review, and noted that, despite its central conclusion that no novel syndrome existed, its other findings made it "equally clear that service in the Gulf war did adversely affect health in some personnel". (Note: Charatan 2006. The quote is of Wessely himself.) Aside from the lack of baseline data to guide analysis of the veterans' postwar health, because no detailed health screening was carried out when the veterans entered service, another major stumbling block with some studies, like the thousand-veteran one, is that the subjects are self-selected, rather than a random sample, making general conclusions impossible.

Increased rates of immune system disorders and other wide-ranging symptoms, including chronic pain, fatigue and memory loss, have been reported in over one quarter of combat veterans of the 1991 Gulf War. Combustion products from depleted uranium munitions are being considered as one of the potential causes by the Research Advisory Committee on Gulf War Veterans' Illnesses, as DU was used in 30 mm and 25 mm cannon rounds on a large scale for the first time in the Gulf War. Veterans of the conflicts in the Persian Gulf, Bosnia and Kosovo have been found to have up to 14 times the usual level of chromosome abnormalities in their genes. Serum-soluble genotoxic teratogens produce congenital disorders, and in white blood cells causes immune system damage.

A 2005 epidemiology review concluded: "In aggregate the human epidemiological evidence is consistent with increased risk of birth defects in offspring of persons exposed to DU." A 2001 study of 15,000 February 1991 U.S. Gulf War combat veterans and 15,000 control veterans found that the Gulf War veterans were 1.8 (fathers) to 2.8 (mothers) times as likely to have children with birth defects. After examination of children's medical records two years later, the birth defect rate increased by more than 20%:

Dr. Kang found that male Gulf War veterans reported having infants with likely birth defects at twice the rate of non-veterans. Furthermore, female Gulf War veterans were almost three times more likely to report children with birth defects than their non-Gulf counterparts. The numbers changed somewhat with medical records verification. However, Dr. Kang and his colleagues concluded that the risk of birth defects in children of deployed male veterans still was about 2.2 times that of non-deployed veterans.

In early 2004, the UK Pensions Appeal Tribunal Service attributed birth defect claims from a February 1991 Gulf War combat veteran to depleted uranium poisoning. Looking at the risk of children of UK Gulf War veterans suffering genetic diseases such as congenital malformations, commonly called "birth defects", one study found that the overall risk of any malformation was 50% higher in Gulf War veterans as compared to other veterans.

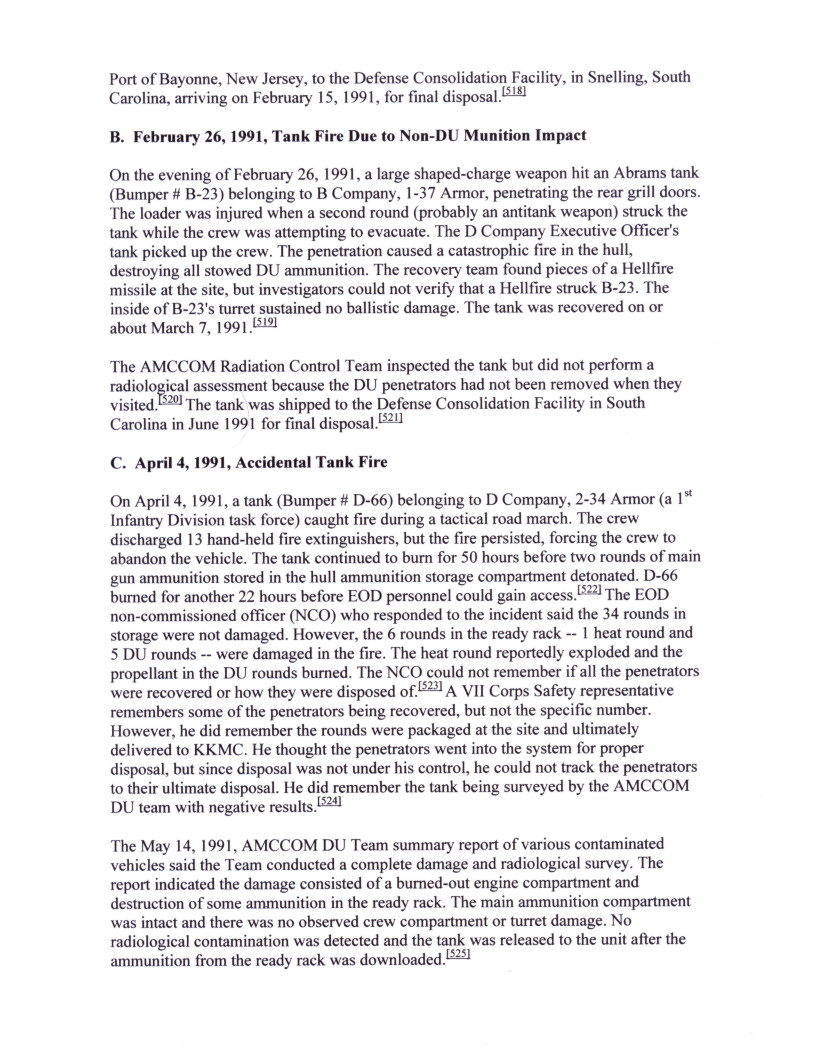
Excerpt from a 1998 evaluation of environmental exposure to depleted uranium in the Persian Gulf by the US Department of Defense

The U.S. Army has commissioned ongoing research into potential risks of depleted uranium and other projectile weapon materials like tungsten, which the U.S. Navy has used in place of DU since 1993. Studies by the U.S. Armed Forces Radiobiology Research Institute conclude that moderate exposures to either depleted uranium or uranium present a significant toxicological threat.

In 2003, Professor Brian Spratt FRS, chairman of the Royal Society's working group on depleted uranium, said: "The question of who carries out the initial monitoring and clean-up is a political rather than scientific question," and "the coalition needs to acknowledge that depleted uranium is a potential hazard and make in-roads into tackling it by being open about where and how much depleted uranium has been deployed."

A 2008 review of all relevant articles appearing in the peer-reviewed journals on MEDLINE through to the end of 2007, including multiple cohort studies of veterans, found no consistent evidence of excess risks of neoplasms that could have some link to DU, and that "[t]he overall incidence of cancers is not increased in the cohort studies of Gulf war and Balkans veterans".

One particular subgroup of veterans that may be at higher risk comprises those who have internally retained fragments of DU from shrapnel wounds. A laboratory study on rats produced by the Armed Forces Radiobiology Research Institute showed that, after a study period of 6 months, rats treated with depleted uranium coming from implanted pellets, comparable to the average levels in the urine of Desert Storm veterans with retained DU fragments, had developed a significant tendency to lose weight with respect to the control group.

Substantial amounts of uranium were accumulating in their brains and central nervous systems, and showed a significant reduction of neuronal activity in the hippocampus in response to external stimuli. The conclusions of the study show that brain damage from chronic uranium intoxication is possible at lower doses than previously thought. Results from computer-based neurocognitive tests performed in 1997 showed an association between uranium in the urine and "problematic performance on automated tests assessing performance efficiency and accuracy."

A 2021 report concluded that uranium from exploding munitions did not lead to Gulf War illness (GWI) in veterans deployed in the 1991 Persian Gulf War. The study found no differences in secretion of uranium isotopic ratios from those meeting the standard-case definitions of GWI and control veterans without GWI. The researchers say that the most likely remaining causes for GWI are widespread low-level exposure to sarin nerve gas released by the destruction of Iraqi chemical weapons storage facilities in January 1991. This was possibly compounded by the use of anti-nerve agent medications and the use of pesticides to prevent insect-borne diseases in coalition forces.

=== Iraqi population ===
Since 2001, medical personnel working for the Iraqi state health service controlled by Saddam Hussein at the Basra hospital in southern Iraq have reported a sharp increase in the incidence of child leukemia and genetic malformation among babies born in the decade following the Gulf War. Iraqi doctors attributed these malformations to possible long-term effects of DU, an opinion that was echoed by several newspapers. In 2004, Iraq had the highest mortality rate due to leukemia of any country. In 2003, the Royal Society called for Western militaries to disclose where and how much DU they had used in Iraq so that rigorous, and hopefully conclusive, studies could be undertaken in affected areas. The International Coalition to Ban Uranium Weapons (ICBUW) likewise urged that an epidemiological study be made in the Basra region, as requested by Iraqi doctors, but no peer-reviewed study has yet been undertaken in Basra.

A medical survey, "Cancer, Infant Mortality and Birth Sex Ratio in Fallujah, Iraq 2005–2009" published in July 2010, states that the "...increases in cancer and birth defects...are alarmingly high" and that infant mortality 2009/2010 has reached 13.6%. The group compares the dramatic increase, five years after wartime exposure in 2004, with the lymphoma that Italian peacekeepers developed after the Balkan wars and the increased cancer risk in certain parts of Sweden because of the Chernobyl fallout. The origin and time of introduction of the carcinogenic agent causing the genetic stress was expected to be addressed by the group in a separate report. The report mentions depleted uranium as one "potentially relevant exposure" but makes no conclusions on the source.

Four studies investigating links between the use of depleted uranium by Coalition forces during the Second Battle of Fallujah were conducted in 2012, one of which described the people of Fallujah as having "the highest rate of genetic damage in any population ever studied." In response to these studies, Ross Caputi, a former U.S. Marine who participated in the battle, wrote a Guardian newspaper article calling for the United States government to conduct its own study into the matter.

=== The Balkans ===
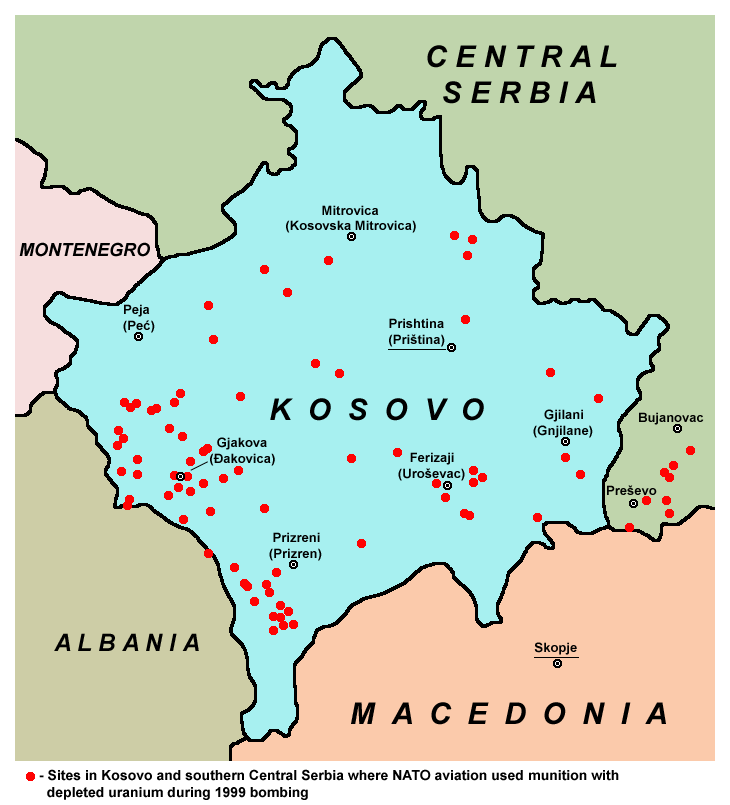
Sites in Kosovo and southern Central Serbia where NATO aviation used depleted uranium during the 1999 Kosovo War.

In 2001, the World Health Organization reported that data from Kosovo was inconclusive and called for further studies. That same year, governments of several European countries, particularly Italy, reported an increase in illnesses and developments of cancers among veterans that served in Balkan peacekeeping missions.

A 2003 study by the United Nations Environment Programme (UNEP) in Bosnia and Herzegovina stated that low levels of contaminant were found in drinking water and air particulate at DU penetrator impact points. The levels were stated as not a cause for alarm. Yet, Pekka Haavisto, chairman of the UNEP DU projects stated, "The findings of this study stress again the importance of appropriate clean-up and civil protection measures in a post-conflict situation."

A team of Italian scientists from the University of Siena reported in 2005 that, although DU was "clearly" added to the soil in the study area, "the phenomenon was very limited spatially and the total uranium concentrations fell within the natural range of the element in soils. Moreover, the absolute uranium concentrations indicate that there was no contamination of the earthworm species studied."

Though a more comprehensive assessment is possible, a 2011 update on a cancer scare regarding Italian soldiers who had served in the Balkans found lower than expected incidence rates for all cancers, a finding "consistent with lacking evidence of an increased cancer incidence among troops of other countries deployed in the areas of Iraq, Bosnia, and Kosovo, where armour-penetrating depleted uranium shells have been used."

In 2018, Serbia set up a commission of inquiry into the consequences of the use of depleted uranium during the 1999 NATO bombing of Yugoslavia in southern Serbia and its link to the rise of diseases and tumors among citizens, particularly in young children born after 1999. Zoran Radovanovic, an epidemiologist and the chairman of the Serbian Medical Association's ethics committee, denied that there had been a rise in cancer cases in areas where bombings had taken place. He continued by saying that Serbians frequently worry about a cancer epidemic that does not exist. NATO has repeatedly claimed that depleted uranium found in the ammunition used in the 1999 bombardments cannot be linked to adverse health effects.

=== Okinawa, Japan ===
Between 1995 and 1996, U.S. Marine AV-8B Harrier jets accidentally fired more than 1,500 DU rounds at the Tori Shima gunnery range. The military did not notify the Japanese government until January 1997.

=== Sardinia, Italy ===
Depleted uranium has been named as a possible contributing factor to a high incidence of birth defects and cancer near the Salto di Quirra weapons testing range on the Italian island of Sardinia.

=== Afghan War ===
The Canadian Uranium Medical Research Centre obtained urine samples from bombed civilian areas in Jalalabad that showed concentrations of 80 to 400 nanograms per litre (5.6×10^{−6} to 2.81×10^{−5} gr/imp gal) of undepleted uranium, far higher than the typical concentration in the British population of ≈5 nanograms per litre (3.5×10^{−7} gr/imp gal).

=== Remscheid, Germany ===
On 8 December 1988, an A-10 Thunderbolt II attack jet of the United States Air Force crashed onto a residential area in the city of Remscheid, West Germany. The aircraft crashed into the upper floor of an apartment complex. In addition to the pilot, five people were killed. Fifty others were injured, many of them seriously. When the number of cancer cases in the vicinity of the accident rose disproportionately in the years after, suspicion rose that the depleted uranium ballast in the jet may have been the cause.

This was denied by the US military. However, 70 tons of top soil from the accident scene was removed and taken away to a depot. Film material taken during the top-soil removal show radiation warning signs. 120 residents and rescue workers reported skin diseases. Medical diagnosis concluded that these symptoms related to toxic irritative dermatitis.

=== Atmospheric contamination ===
Elevated radiation levels consistent with very low level atmospheric depleted uranium contamination have been found in air samples taken by the UK Atomic Weapons Establishment at several monitoring sites in Britain. These elevated readings appear to coincide with Operation Anaconda in Afghanistan, and the Shock and Awe bombing campaign at the start of the Second Gulf War.

=== Other contamination cases ===
On 4 October 1992, an El Al Boeing 747-F cargo aircraft (Flight 1862) crashed into an apartment building in Amsterdam, Netherlands. Local residents and rescue workers complained of various unexplained health issues, which were being attributed to the release of hazardous materials during the crash and subsequent fires. Authorities conducted an epidemiological study in 2000 of those believed to be affected by the accident. The study concluded that there was no evidence to link depleted uranium (used as counterbalance weights on the elevators of the plane) to any of the reported health complaints.

There have been accidents involving uranium hexafluoride in the United States, including one in which 32 workers were exposed to a cloud of UF_{6} and its reaction products in 1986 at a Gore, Oklahoma, commercial uranium conversion facility. One person died; while a few workers with higher exposure experienced short-term kidney damage (e.g., protein in the urine), none of them showed lasting damage from the exposure to uranium.

== See also ==
- Environmental impact of war
- Radiological warfare
- Dirty bomb

== Cited sources ==
- Charatan, Fred (2006). "Gulf war symptoms do not constitute a syndrome". BMJ. 333 (7569): 618. doi:10.1136/bmj.333.7569.618-b. JSTOR 40700302. PMC 1570822. PMID 16990302.
- Greenberg, Neil; Iversen, Amy C.; Unwin, Catherin; Hull, L.; Wessely, S. (2004). "Screening for depleted uranium in the United Kingdom armed forces: who wants it and why?". Journal of Epidemiology and Community Health. 58 (7): 558–561. doi:10.1136/jech.2003.014142. PMC 1732813. PMID 15194715.
- Moszynski, Peter (2003). "Royal Society warns of risks from depleted uranium". BMJ. 326 (7396): 952. doi:10.1136/bmj.326.7396.952. JSTOR 25454350. PMC 1125878. PMID 12727744.
- Mould, Richard F. (2001). "Radiation dose from depleted uranium can now be measured". BMJ. 322 (7290): 865–866. doi:10.1136/bmj.322.7290.865/a. JSTOR 25466697. PMC 1120031. PMID 11321019. S2CID 683662.
- Royal Society working group on the health hazards of depleted uranium munitions (2002). The health hazards of depleted uranium munitions: Part II (Report). London, England: The Royal Society.
