= Threshold dose =

Threshold dose is the minimum dose of drug that triggers minimal detectable biological effect in an animal. At extremely low doses, biological responses are absent for some of the drugs. The increase in dose above threshold dose induces an increase in the percentage of biological responses. Several benchmarks have been established to describe the effects of a particular dose of drug in a particular species, such as no-observed-effect-level (NOEL), no-observed-adverse-effect-level (NOAEL), and lowest-observed-adverse-effect-level (LOAEL). They are established by reviewing the available studies and animal studies. The application of threshold dose in risk assessment safeguards the participants in human clinical trials and evaluates the risks of chronic exposure to certain substances. However, the nature of animal studies also limits the applicability of experimental results in the human population and its significance in evaluating potential risk of certain substances. In toxicology, there are some other safety factors including LD_{50}, LC_{50}, and EC_{50}.

== Dose levels ==
Threshold dose is a dose of drug barely adequate to produce a biological effect in an animal. In dose-response assessment, the term ‘threshold dose’ is refined into several terminologies, such as NOEL, NOAEL, and LOAEL. They define the limits of doses resulting in biological responses or toxic effects. Common responses are alterations in structures, growth, development and average lifespan of the treated group of organisms. The changes are found by comparing the observations between the treated and control groups. Both groups are of the same species and have the same environment of exposure in the trial. The only difference is that the treated group receives the experimental substance while the control group does not.

For the drugs administered by oral and dermal route, the units of threshold dose are mg/kg body-weight/day (dose of the drug in mg per body weight in kg per day) or ppm (parts per million), while the threshold dose of drugs by inhalation delivery has the unit of mg/L 6h/day (amount of drug in mg in 1 L of air, for 6 hours per day).

=== NOEL ===
NOEL is no-observed-effect-level. It is the maximum dose of a substance that has no observable effect on the treated group in human clinical trials or animal experimental trials. In some literature, NOEL is the only dose level referred by the terminology ‘threshold dose’.

=== NOAEL ===
NOAEL is no-observed-adverse-effect-level. It is the maximum dose of a substance that has no observable adverse effect on the treated group in human clinical trials or animal experimental trials.

=== LOAEL ===
LOAEL is lowest-observed-adverse-effect-level. It is the minimum dose of a substance that produces an observable adverse effect on the treated group in human clinical trials or animal experimental trials. There is a biologically or statistically significant increase in the prevalence of adverse effect in the treated group above this level.

Examples for NOAEL and LOAEL
Substance	Animal	NOAEL	LOAEL	Reference
Oxydemeton-methyl	Rat	0.5 mg/kg/day	2.3 mg/kg/day	
Boron	Rat	55 mg/kg/day	76 mg/kg/day	
Barium	Rat	0.21 mg/kg/day	0.51 mg/kg/day	
Trifluoroiodomethane	Rat	20000 ppm for non-thyroid related effects	20000 ppm for thyroid related effects	
Acetaminophen	Human	25 mg/kg/day	75 mg/kg/day	

== Establishment of dose levels ==
=== Factors affecting threshold dose ===
The dose-response relationship is dependent on various factors. They include the physicochemical properties of the drug, route of administration or exposure, duration of exposure, population size, and the characteristics of the studied organism such as their species, sex, ages, etc. The type of biological responses is also a significant factor for the variations of a dose-response relationship. Each response corresponds to one unique relationship. As it is not practical to establish the dose-response relationships for all possible responses, the studies usually narrow down the scopes to a few responses. All available studies examining the correlation between the target drug and its biological responses will be reviewed. The selection criteria for the critical responses for assessment is that the dose required to produce that particular response is the lowest. The precursor of a biological effect can also be the response for assessment. For instance, the risk factors of a disease may eventually precipitate the disease. In the study of the relationship between a drug and the development of a particular cardiovascular disease, the risk factors of the disease can be considered as the responses for measurement as well.

=== Process to evaluate threshold dose ===
A two-step process is adopted to evaluate the specific dose levels, NOAEL and LOAEL. The first step is to carry out reviews of available studies or animal studies to obtain data on the effect of different doses of the target drug. They allow the establishment of dose-response relationships over the range of doses reported in the data collected. Often the data collected is inadequate to produce a range wide enough to observe the dose in which biological responses are not induced in humans. The dose which is sufficiently low to prevent the occurrence of the response in humans cannot be evaluated and therefore paves the way to the second step, extrapolation of the dose-response relationship. The results beyond the range covered by the available data are estimated. It attempts to make inferences of the region that the critical dose levels such as NOAEL and LOAEL fell within. Thus the doses starting to trigger adverse effects in humans can be evaluated.

For step one, the two common approaches for evaluating threshold doses are qualitative examination of available studies and animal studies.

==== Qualitative examination of available studies ====
The effects of the target drug at different doses are obtained from available studies. The dose-response relationship will be identified and extrapolation is often required to make inferences about the dose levels below the range of data collected.

==== Animal studies ====
Animal studies are conducted when the data collected from qualitative examination of available studies is scarce. It is for expanding the range of doses. Also, animal studies allow the manipulation of the study design, such as the age and gender of treated animals. Animal study is therefore less susceptible to the influences of confounders than observational studies and therefore contributes to a more rigorous dose-response assessment. As the assessed animals exhibit variation in characteristics with humans such as body size, extrapolation should be carried out to estimate the dose-response relationship in humans.

A common animal study is repeated dose toxicity testing. The participating species are divided into 4 groups, receiving placebo, low dose, mid-dose and high dose of the drugs respectively. Within the same group, the same dose is given on a daily basis for a specified period, such as 28 days or 90 days. Subsequent to the specified period, necropsy or tissue samples collection allows identification of the dose levels bring about certain effects and therefore establishment of NOAEL and LOAEL.

== Significance ==
The threshold doses such as NOAEL, LOAEL and NOEL are essential values in risk assessment. The maximum safe starting doses of different drugs can be obtained from them prior to human clinical trials. Another application is to assess the safe dose for chronic exposure. They are utilized to estimate the daily exposure which does not induce detrimental effects in humans in their lifetime, which is also known as the reference dose (RfD).

The variations between different species and the extrapolation of dose-response relationship generated from animal studies to that for humans introduce uncertainties into the analysis of dose-response. Humans also manifest intra-variation of sensitivity towards a particular substance among the population. As a result, 10-fold uncertainty factors (UF) are applied to convert NOAEL to the reference dose. The UFinter and UFintra account for the inter- and intra-species variation respectively.

RfD = NOAEL ÷ (UFinter × UFintra)

== Limitations ==
=== Inapplicability ===
For carcinogenic substances, theoretically NOAEL and LOAEL do not exist as there is no safe dose for the carcinogens. A linear no-threshold model is commonly used for illustrating the probability of cancer development from radiation. There is no threshold value at which stochastic health effects start emerging. Only for non-cancer health outcomes, there is an assumption of the presence of a safety margin below which no negative biological effect is expected.

=== Inconsistency ===
Most dose-response models are obtained from animal experiments out of ethical concerns. Therefore, the results might not be consistent with that of the human population. Individual differences also arise among people in terms of age, weight, gender, health status, etc. Thus, in most circumstances, the threshold dose serves as a reference to evaluate the probable outcome of a certain dosage of a substance for the general population, while great deviations might exist in special populations such as immunocompromised patients, pregnant women and young children.

=== Incomprehensiveness ===
The threshold dose is only a measure of acute toxicity since the drug or toxic substance investigated is administered at once. The consequence of long-term administration remains unknown. As the threshold dose is the measured minimal response, its accuracy heavily depends on the machinery used. It is possible that further refinement is needed. Furthermore, the threshold dose only reflects the dose required for a minimum detectable response but it should not be misunderstood that health effects are absolutely absent in the doses below the threshold dose.

== Other safety factors ==
=== LD_{50}, LC_{50} ===
The median lethal dose (LD_{50}) of a substance is defined as the dose that leads to death in 50% of the tested population. It is a significant parameter in toxicology study and indicates the acute toxicity of a particular substance. LD_{50} is usually expressed in the weight of the chemical administered in milligram per unit of body weight (mg/kg). In the discussion of environmental toxins, as there is no direct administration of toxic materials, a similar parameter LC50 will be mentioned instead. LC50 is the concentration of substance in air that kills half of the tested population during the experimental period.

=== EC_{50} ===
The median effective concentration (EC_{50}) is the concentration of a drug required to reach 50% of the maximal biological effect the drug can exert. It is a reflection of the potency of a drug and is expressed in molar units such as mol/L. The value of EC_{50} greatly depends on the affinity of the drug for its receptor, as well as the efficacy of the drug, which conveys receptor occupancy and the ability of the drug to trigger a biological response. EC_{50} is incorporated in the Hill equation, a function that demonstrates the relationship between agonist concentration and ligand binding. EC_{50} is mathematically given as the inflection point of the equation.
