= Maximum acceptable toxicant concentration =

The maximum acceptable toxicant concentration (MATC) is a value that is calculated through aquatic toxicity tests to help set water quality regulations for the protection of aquatic life. Using the results of a partial life-cycle chronic toxicity test, the MATC is reported as the geometric mean between the No Observed Effect Concentration (NOEC) and the lowest observed effect concentration (LOEC).

The MATC is used to set regulatory standards for priority pollutants under the US federal Clean Water Act. Regulatory guidelines give two acceptable concentrations of pollutants to protect against effects: chronic or acute. Since the MATC should only be reported in chronic toxicity tests, there is a widely accepted method to convert the chronic MATC to a concentration that protects against acute effects.

The MATC is calculated and reported from the results of a number of standard procedures designed by the United States Environmental Protection Agency (US EPA) and other organizations to maintain high accuracy and precision among all toxicity tests for regulatory purposes.

== Calculation ==
=== Chronic toxicity tests ===
In a toxicity test, the NOEC and LOEC are derived as a comparison from the negative control, or the experimental group that does not contain the chemical in question. The NOEC is the highest concentration that does not cause a statistically different effect than the negative control through statistical hypothesis testing. Likewise, the LOEC is the lowest concentration tested that does cause a statistically different effect than the negative control. The MATC is the geometric mean between these two values, such that: MATC=√(NOEC)(LOEC)

The MATC is calculated to protect against chronic effects on overall function or health of an organism, not death. A partial life cycle test must be used. This type of toxicity test uses organisms in their most sensitive life stages, usually during times of early reproduction and growth, but not juveniles. The MATC is the highest concentration that should not cause chronic effects, however, for regulatory purposes, a maximum concentration to protect against acute effects must exist as well.

=== Applying MATC to acutely toxic concentrations ===
The MATC can be applied to the results of an acute toxicity test to obtain a concentration that would protect against adverse effects during an acute exposure. An LC_{50}, or the concentration at which 50% of the organisms die during an acute toxicity test is used to derive a value called the acute to chronic ratio (ACR).

The MATC can be used to calculate the ACR as follows: $ACR= LC50/MATC$

The ACR is useful for estimating an MATC for species in which only acute toxicity data exists, or for setting regulatory guidelines for the protection of aquatic life through water quality criteria by the US EPA.

== Regulatory uses ==
=== United States ===
The US EPA is the governmental organization responsible for writing and enforcing environmental regulations passed by Congress. The Clean Water Act was passed in 1972.

Section 304(a)(1) of the Clean Water Act is the Water Quality Criteria (WQC) developed for the protection of aquatic life and human health. The MATC and ACR are used in a sequence of calculations to obtain the Criterion Maximum Concentration and Criterion Continuous Concentration (CMC and CCC, respectively) for the chemicals being regulated.

The CMC and CCC are two of the six parts of the aquatic life criterion under the WQC, and are the actual regulatory values for all priority pollutants tested. The CMC is the highest concentration of a chemical in water that aquatic organisms can be exposed to acutely without causing an adverse effect. Likewise, the CCC is the highest concentration of a chemical in water that aquatic organisms can be exposed to indefinitely without resulting in an adverse effect. Typically, the CMC is higher than the CCC.

=== Canada ===
Environment Canada is the regulatory agency for environmental protection in Canada. Under the Canada Water Act of 1970, the Canadian Water Quality Guidelines (CWQG) for the Protection of Aquatic Life give regulatory guidelines of maximum concentrations of pollutants that are acceptable in freshwater and marine environments.

The CWQG's long and short-term exposure concentrations are derived in a similar way as the methods used by the US EPA, and are the CMC or CCC equivalents. When an MATC is reported with toxicity tests, it has sometimes been called a threshold-observed-effect-concentration (TOEC). The MATC and TOEC are both calculated as the geometric mean of the NOEC and LOEC, and are often used interchangeably.

=== Standard methods ===
Standard methods are designed and used widely to maximize precision and accuracy for all toxicity tests. Values derived from toxicity tests such as the MATC are reported to regulatory organizations like the US EPA and Environment Canada so more confident regulations can be designed.

Some common standard methods include those designed by the governmental organizations like Environment Canada, the US EPA, or the United States Food and Drug Administration (FDA). Others are designed by scientific organizations such as ASTM International, or the OECD.

Many of these methods use the same test organism or are designed for the same exposure time. Common test organisms include, but are not limited to, daphnia, fathead minnow, rainbow trout, and mussels. Acute toxicity tests are normally 24–96 hours, whereas chronic tests will typically run for a week or longer.

== Advantages and limitations ==
Using the MATC to derive regulatory guidelines has been accompanied with some debate. Hypothesis testing, or statistical tests performed with data sets that only report a significant difference, are not considered the most statistically robust. There are no confidence intervals to show a measure of uncertainty in a NOEC and LOEC. In addition, the NOEC and LOEC can only be concentrations in the test, and nothing in between. Because of these reasons, values that are derived through curve fitting methods, such as an LC50, or EC10 (the concentration that causes the measured effect in 10% of organisms) would be preferred if it was possible more often.

From a regulatory standpoint, there are advantages to using results from hypothesis tests. NOEC and LOEC's were used more often in the past, and there are more test results reporting NOEC and LOEC's than EC10's. The time and effort required to perform all of the previous tests to derive a different value is not seen as a good use of resources. In addition, the use of NOEC and LOEC's allows for reporting of one number to regulatory agencies. Water Quality Criteria are reported as one number that the actual concentration must remain below. If the MATC were reported as a range of values to account for uncertainty, the regulatory guidelines would not be presented as a single value.

== One Health Implications ==
The Maximum Acceptable Toxicant Concentration is a critical benchmark within the One Health framework, which emphasizes the fundamental interconnectedness of human, animal, and environmental health. Although the MATC is technically derived from aquatic chronic toxicity data, its application in modern regulatory science provides a trans-disciplinary bridge between environmental monitoring and the protection of global health security.

1. Integrated Risk Assessment

Contemporary toxicological research is shifting toward Integrated Risk Assessment, a model that evaluates chemical safety by linking environmental exposure directly to human health outcomes. Because MATC values are calculated using sub-lethal chronic endpoints such as growth and reproduction, they provide essential biological data required for these integrated models;. This integrated approach allows scientists to better understand how low-level chemical concentrations in aquatic ecosystems can have cascading effects across the environment - animal - human interface.

2. Sentinel Species and Food Safety

In a One Health context, aquatic organisms serve as "sentinels" for emerging environmental hazards. For example, establishing chronic thresholds for persistent contaminants, such as per- and polyfluoroalkyl substances, is a vital component of assessing chemical safety in shared water bodies;. Ensuring that environmental concentrations remain below the MATC for sensitive aquatic taxa is a primary preventative measure; it helps mitigate the bioaccumulation of toxins in fish and seafood, thereby protecting human populations from long-term health risks like immunotoxicity and cancer;.

3. Protection of Ecosystem Services

The One Health paradigm highlights that human well-being is dependent on "ecosystem services," such as clean drinking water, nutrient cycling, and biodiversity. Benchmarks like the MATC are utilized to derive Environmental Quality Standards that specifically aim to protect the functional groups responsible for these services. By maintaining chemical levels below chronic effect thresholds, regulators safeguard the resilience of ecosystems that support human life and prevent environmental degradation;.
