= MATC =

MATC may refer to:

- Madison Area Technical College
- Maximum Acceptable Toxicant Concentration
- Milwaukee Area Technical College
- Mountainland Technical College (formerly known as the Mountainland Applied Technology College)
- Manhattan Area Technical College
