= Early Stage =

Early Stage may refer to:

== Biology, medicine, biosciences ==
- Early Life Stage test, a toxicity test using embryo or larvae
- Early stage cancer, referred to as the Clinical Classification of cancer

== Arts, entertainment, media ==
- Early Stages, a box set by rock band Marillion
- God of Gamblers 3: The Early Stage, 1997 Hong-Kong film
- Monstercat 002 – Early Stage, a 2011 compilation album by Monstercat

== Other uses ==
- 'Early Years Foundation Stage', from Section 39 of the Childcare Act 2006 in the United Kingdom

== See also ==
- Educational stage
- Early life (disambiguation)
- Stage (disambiguation)
