= Early life =

Early life may refer to:

== Biology ==
=== In relation to Earthly history of life ===
- RNA world, early in the history of terrestrial life
- Ediacaran period, early in the history of terrestrial life
- Cambrian Explosion period, early in the history of terrestrial life

=== In relation to biological organisms ===
- Zygote, at the start of an organism's life
- Embryo, early in an organism's life
- Foetus, early in an animal's life, occurring before birth
- Larva, an early stage in many animal life forms before maturity
- Child, early human life

== Other uses ==
- My Early Life (book), 1930 autobiography by Winston Churchill The Third

== See also ==
- Early Life Stage test
- Early Stage (disambiguation)
- Life (disambiguation)
