= Predicted no-effect concentration =

The predicted no-effect concentration (PNEC) is the concentration of a chemical which marks the limit at which below no adverse effects of exposure in an ecosystem are measured. PNEC values are intended to be conservative and predict the concentration at which a chemical will likely have no toxic effect. They are not intended to predict the upper limit of concentration of a chemical that has a toxic effect. PNEC values are often used in environmental risk assessment as a tool in ecotoxicology. A PNEC for a chemical can be calculated with acute toxicity or chronic toxicity single-species data, Species Sensitivity Distribution (SSD) multi-species data, field data or model ecosystems data. Depending on the type of data used, an assessment factor is used to account for the confidence of the toxicity data being extrapolated to an entire ecosystem.

== Calculation methods ==
=== Assessment factor ===
The use of assessment factors allows for laboratory, single-species and short term toxicity data to be extrapolated to conservatively predict ecosystem effects and accounts for the uncertainty in the extrapolation. The value of the assessment factor is dependent on the uncertainty of the available data and ranges from 1-1000.

=== Acute toxicity data ===
Acute toxicity data includes LC50 and EC50 data. This data is frequently screened for quality, relevancy and ideally contains data for species in multiple trophic levels and/or taxonomic groups. The lowest LC50 in the compiled database is then divided by the assessment factor to calculate the PNEC for that data. The assessment factor applied to acute toxicity data is typically 1000.

=== Chronic toxicity data ===
Chronic toxicity data includes NOEC data. The lowest NOEC value in the test dataset is divided by an assessment factor between 10 and 100 dependent on the diversity of test organisms and the amount of data available. If there are more species or data, the assessment factor is lower.

=== Species sensitivity data ===
A PNEC may also be statistically derived from a SSD which is a model of the variability in the sensitivity of multiple species to a single toxicant or other stressor. The hazardous concentration for five percent of the species (HC5) in the SSD is used to derive the PNEC. The HC5 is the concentration at which five percent of the species in the SSD exhibit an effect. The HC5 is typically divided by an assessment factor of 1-5. In many cases, SSDs may not exist due to the lack of data on a large number of species. In these cases, the assessment factor approach to derivation of a PNEC should be used.

=== Field data or model ecosystems ===
Field data or model ecosystems data includes field toxicity data and mesocosm toxicity. The magnitude of the assessment factor is study-specific in these types of studies.

== Applications ==
=== Environmental risk assessment ===
PNEC is used extensively in Europe by the European Chemicals Agency, the Registration, Evaluation, Authorisation and Restriction of Chemicals program and other toxicology agencies to assess environmental risk. PNEC values can be used in conjunction with predicted environmental concentration values to calculate a risk characterization ratio (RCR), also called a Risk Quotient (RQ). RCR is equal to the PEC divided by the PNEC for a specific chemical and is a deterministic approach to estimating environmental risk at local or regional scales. If the PNEC exceeds the PEC, the conclusion is that the chemical poses no environmental risk.

== Assumptions ==
Derivation of PNEC for use in environmental risk lacks some scientific validity because the assessment factors are derived empirically. Additionally, PNECs derived from single-species toxicity data also assume that ecosystems are as sensitive as the most sensitive species and that the ecosystem function is dependent on the ecosystem structure.
