= Combination drug =

Drug with two or more active ingredients

A combination drug or drug cocktail is most simply defined as a chemical composition of at least two drugs combined in a single dosage form, typically as a tablet or capsule to be administered orally, an elixir or tincture (sublingual), an injectable suspension (intramuscular administration or intravenous therapy), or a suppository (rectal). A legitimate combination drug that exceeds rigorous laboratory quality standards and is approved for medical use is a safe option for treating multiple symptoms or diseases amongst various patients within a large population–and this includes combinations of over-the-counter medicine and/or of prescription drugs. One example of a drug cocktail is a drug regiment in antiviral-therapy (ART); PReP, used HIV transmission prophylaxis or HIV/AIDS symptoms, is a combination drug.

When medications are paired with supplements, consumers can be certain of accurate dosing and ingredient labeling, as well as product quality, since the product would be regulated and manufactured as a medication and must meet rigorous standards of pharmaceutical quality.

== Terminology ==
While "combination drug" is the most common generic term, specific subsets exist based on the number and type of ingredients:

- Fixed-dose combination (FDC): A mass-produced, standardized prescription or over-the-counter medication with specific, unalterable ratios of active ingredients.
- Drug cocktail: A colloquial or historical term often used to describe customized combinations of separate pills administered together (such as early HIV treatments), though it is occasionally used interchangeably with FDCs.
- Polypill: A specialized fixed-dose combination pill that contains four or more distinct active ingredients. These are frequently used in cardiovascular medicine to simplify preventive care, often produced at a compounding pharmacy due to the specific dosage, dosage form, and modified release mechanism. Polypills can encompass four or more of any combination of approved prescription drugs and over the counter drugs, as well as nutritional supplements and hormones, amino acids, enzymes, vitamins, and/or essential minerals.

== History ==
Fixed-dose combination drugs were initially developed to target a single disease, as with antiretroviral FDCs indicated for treating AIDS and HIV. Combination drug treatment conceptually emphasizes simplified treatment plans, reduced pill burden and increased patient compliance by offering accessible and affordable ingredients, generally generic drugs with established therapeutic efficacy, and the ability to treat a variety of symptoms and conditions amongst a large patient population with varying treatment needs.

== Rationale and clinical utility ==
{{unsourced}|section|date=May 2026}} The medical rationale for combination drugs centers on improving public health outcomes by making complex treatments easier for patients to manage. Combining multiple therapies into one dose reduces the likelihood of missed doses, which is critical in treating chronic conditions or infectious diseases.

However, fixed-dose combinations have notable limitations. They offer physicians less flexibility to adjust the dosage of an individual component ingredient to manage patient-specific side effects. Additionally, if an allergic reaction occurs, identifying which active ingredient caused the reaction is more difficult.

== See also ==
- WHO Model List of Essential Medicines
- Polypharmacy
