= PNEC =

PNEC may refer to:

- Pakistan Navy Engineering College
- Predicted no-effect concentration
- Pulmonary neuroendocrine cells
