= Toxica =

Toxica (Latin for toxic) may refer to:

- Melanodermatitis toxica lichenoides, an occupational dermatosis that occurs among tar handlers after several years' exposure
- Toxica (Power Rangers), a Power Rangers Wild Force character
- "La Tóxica", a song by Farruko from the 2021 album La 167
- Jessica Toxica, a character in the Mexican drama series Mujeres asesinas
