= Toxicophore =

Chemical structure related to toxic properties of chemical

A toxicophore is a chemical structure or a portion of a structure (e.g., a functional group) that is related to the toxic properties of a chemical. Toxicophores can act directly (e.g., dioxins) or can require metabolic activation (e.g., tobacco-specific nitrosamines).

Most toxic substances exert their toxicity through some interaction (e.g., covalent bonding, oxidation) with cellular macromolecules like proteins or DNA. This interaction leads to changes in the normal cellular biochemistry and physiology and downstream toxic effects. Occasionally, the toxicophore requires enzyme-mediated bioactivation (toxication) to produce a more reactive metabolite that is more toxic. For example, tobacco-specific nitrosamines are activated by cytochrome P450 enzymes to form a more reactive substance that can covalently bind to DNA, causing mutations that, if not repaired, can lead to cancer. Generally, different chemical compounds that contain the same toxicophore elicit similar toxic effects at the same site of toxicity.

Medicinal chemists and structural biologists study toxicophores in order to predict (and hopefully avoid) potentially toxic compounds early in the drug development process. Toxicophores can also be identified in lead compounds and removed or replaced later in the process with less toxic moieties. Both techniques, in silico (predictive) and a posteriori (experimental), are active areas of chemoinformatics research and development, within the field known as Computational Toxicology. For example, in the United States, the EPA's National Center for Computational Toxicology sponsors several toxicity databases based on predictive modeling as well as high-throughput screening experimental methods.
