= International Coalition to Ban Uranium Weapons =

International anti-nuclear weapons organization

The International Coalition to Ban Uranium Weapons (ICBUW) is a global coalition of 160 groups in 33 countries. It was formed in 2003 in Berlaar, Belgium to promote a campaign based on reliable information on depleted uranium (DU) weapons. Until 2018 it was based in Manchester, England, then the office has been transferred from Manchester to Berlin.

ICBUW campaigns for a ban on the use, transport, manufacture, sale, and export of all conventional weapon systems containing uranium (usually called depleted uranium weapons). It also seeks health monitoring and compensation for communities affected by the use of uranium weapons and the environmental remediation of such sites.

== Lobbying ==
In advocating for a treaty ban on uranium weapons, ICBUW states that it is following the example of the International Campaign to Ban Landmines and the Cluster Munition Coalition. Its grassroots member organisations lobby at a national level, while it lobbies supranational bodies such as the European Parliament and the United Nations.

ICBUW has prepared a draft convention for a ban on depleted uranium weapons. It contains a general and comprehensive prohibition of the development, production, transport, storage, possession, transfer, and use of uranium ammunition, uranium armour-plate, and of any other military use of uranium. The Convention also outlines obligations concerning the abolition of uranium weapons and the destruction of uranium weapons construction facilities. In addition it obliges states to ensure a rapid decontamination of radioactive battlefields and test ranges, emphasising the protection of, and assistance to, civilians living in these areas, and obliges states to compensate the victims.

== Media ==
In 2011, ICBUW released an animated short film developed in cooperation with Dutch non-governmental organization (NGO) 'IKV Pax Christi'. When the Dust Settles outlines ICBUW's position and calls for a precautionary approach to the weapons. In 2012, ICBUW and Dutch NGO IKV Pax Christi launched the Toxic Remnants of War Project which aims to consider and quantify the detrimental impact of war, military operations and munitions on the environment and human health, with particular focus on the release of toxic materials during military activities.

== See also ==
- Campaign for Nuclear Disarmament
- Anti-nuclear movement
- Nuclear Information Service
