= Early Life Stage test =

Chronic toxicity test

An early life stage (ELS) test is a chronic toxicity test using sensitive early life stages like embryos or larvae to predict the effects of toxicants on organisms. ELS tests were developed to be quicker and more cost-efficient than full life-cycle tests, taking on average 1–5 months to complete compared to 6–12 months for a life-cycle test. They are commonly used in aquatic toxicology, particularly with fish. Growth and survival are the typically measured endpoints, for which a Maximum Acceptable Toxicant Concentration (MATC) can be estimated. ELS tests allow for the testing of fish species that otherwise could not be studied due to length of life, spawning requirements, or size. ELS tests are used as part of environmental risk assessments by regulatory agencies including the U.S. Environmental Protection Agency (EPA) and Environment Canada, as well as the Organisation for Economic Co-operation and Development (OECD).

== Development ==
ELS tests were adapted from full life-cycle toxicity tests, chronic tests that expose an organism to a contaminant for its entire life-cycle. These are widely considered to be the best tests for estimating long-term "safe" concentrations of toxicants in aquatic organisms. The first full life-cycle tests on fish were developed for the fathead minnow (Pimephales promelas), and later for bluegill (Lepomis macrochirus), brook trout (Salvelinus fontinalis), flagfish (Jordanella floridae), and sheepshead minnow (Cyprinodon variegatus). While useful, full life-cycle tests require a high number of test organisms and extensive exposure time in the lab, especially for vertebrates. Typically, life-cycle tests take 6–12 months for fathead minnow and 30 months for brook trout.

Following the passage of the Toxic Substances Control Act (TSCA) in the United States in 1976, there was an increased need for quicker, more efficient vertebrate toxicity tests. The EPA was now required to assess the environmental effects of new chemicals before they could be commercially produced. Less costly and time-intensive tests were needed to evaluate a multitude of new chemicals. Researchers began developing toxicity tests that focused on early life stages, since these have been shown to be more sensitive to environmental stressors than later life stages. Many critical events occur in a short period of time in the early stages of development. If a stressor disrupts developmental events (including their timing), it could result in adverse effects that reduce the organism's chances of survival. Meta-analysis has found that early life-cycle portions of full life-cycle tests usually estimate an MATC within a factor of 2 of full life-cycle estimates in saltwater and freshwater fish. In 83% of 72 tests, the ELS portion resulted in the same MATC as the full life-cycle estimate, and the remaining 17% were within a factor of 2.

== Limitations ==
There remain some limitations with early life stage toxicity testing. Although ELS tests are quicker and more cost-efficient than full life cycle tests, they remain resource- and time-intensive. Fish early life stage (FELS) tests require hundreds of fish and 1 to 5 months to complete. Other issues include the lack of mechanistic information, differing sensitivities between species, and insensitivity to parental exposure. ELS tests don't provide information on the toxicant's mechanism of action. Sensitivity to specific toxicants varies with species, so the most sensitive or most important species should be tested in each case. ELS tests appear to be insensitive to parental exposure, and MATCs are generally the same for embryos of both exposed and unexposed parents. This could be due to the mode of action of the toxicant or the variability and insensitivity of ELS test design. Additionally, growth response has been found to be an insensitive endpoint in ELS tests with fish, having little bearing on the estimation of an MATC. Growth response could be omitted to reduce the duration and cost of screening tests.

== Methodology ==
In a typical early life stage toxicity test, a flow-through dilutor system administers different concentrations of a toxicant to different test chambers. At least five different concentrations of a toxicant are tested, plus controls, with at least two exposure chambers for each treatment. The length of the exposure depends on the test species. For example, fathead minnow tests are 1–2 months long, while brook trout tests are around 5 months long. Growth and survival are the typical endpoints, for which an MATC can be found.

Standard methods for ELS tests have been established by the OECD, ASTM International, the EPA, and Environment Canada.

== Regulatory uses ==
- The FELS guideline of the OECD Guidelines for the Testing of Chemicals is the primary test used internationally to estimate chronic fish toxicity.
- FELS tests are part of a suite of sublethal toxicity tests for effluent used by Environment Canada in environmental effects monitoring.
- A FELS test is required or recommended by the US EPA for testing and monitoring chemicals released into aquatic systems.

== Current developments ==
An extended ELS test has been examined as a potential surrogate for a fish full life-cycle test to detect weak environmental estrogens. Endocrine active chemicals (EACs) are ubiquitous in the environment, prompting the need for better screening assays to predict their effects, especially in aquatic species. Slightly longer ELS tests could be used instead of full life-cycle tests, taking into account sensitive windows of exposure like sexual differentiation and early gonadal development. Extended ELS tests have proven successful in detecting the effects of weak estrogens in fathead minnows.

Additionally, adverse outcome pathways (AOPs) are being used to develop an alternative to FELS testing. Industry and regulatory agencies are increasingly interested in an animal-free, cost-efficient surrogate. Researchers are developing FELS-related AOPs to create a high-throughput, less costly screening strategy for toxicants that takes the mechanism of action into account.
