= Toxicity =

Dose dependant harmfulness of substances

- The skull and crossbones is a common symbol for toxicity.

Toxicity is the degree to which a chemical substance or a particular mixture of substances can damage an organism. Toxicity can refer to the effect on a whole organism, such as an animal, bacterium, or plant, as well as the effect on a substructure of the organism, such as a cell (cytotoxicity) or an organ such as the liver (hepatotoxicity). Sometimes the word is more or less synonymous with poisoning in everyday usage.

A central concept of toxicology is that the effects of a toxicant are dose-dependent; even water can lead to water intoxication when taken in too high a dose, whereas for even a very toxic substance such as snake venom there is a dose below which there is no detectable toxic effect. Toxicity is species-specific, making cross-species analysis problematic. Newer paradigms and metrics are evolving to bypass animal testing, while maintaining the concept of toxicity endpoints.

== Etymology ==
In Ancient Greek medical literature, the adjective τοξικόν (meaning "toxic") was used to describe substances which had the ability of "causing death or serious debilitation or exhibiting symptoms of infection." The word draws its origins from the Greek noun τόξον toxon (meaning "arc"), in reference to the use of bows and poisoned arrows as weapons.

== History ==
Humans have a deeply rooted history of not only being aware of toxicity, but also taking advantage of it as a tool. Archaeologists studying bone arrows from caves of Southern Africa have noted the likelihood that some, aging 72,000 to 80,000 years old, were dipped in specially prepared poisons to increase their lethality. Although scientific instrumentation limitations make it difficult to prove concretely, archaeologists hypothesize the practice of making poison arrows was widespread in cultures as early as the Paleolithic era. The San people of Southern Africa have managed to preserve this practice into the modern era, with the knowledge base to form complex mixtures from poisonous beetles and plant derived extracts, yielding an arrow-tip product with a shelf life beyond several months to a year.

== Types ==
In general, there are five types of toxicities: chemical, biological, physical, radioactive and behavioural.

Disease-causing microorganisms and parasites are toxic in a broad sense but are generally called pathogens rather than toxicants. The biological toxicity of pathogens can be difficult to measure because the threshold dose may be a single organism. Theoretically one virus, bacterium or worm can reproduce to cause a serious infection. If a host has an intact immune system, the inherent toxicity of the organism is balanced by the host's response; the effective toxicity is then a combination. In some cases, e.g. cholera toxin, the disease is chiefly caused by a nonliving substance secreted by the organism, rather than the organism itself. Such nonliving biological toxicants are generally called toxins if produced by a microorganism, plant, or fungus, and venoms if produced by an animal.

Physical toxicants are substances that, due to their physical nature, interfere with biological processes. Examples include coal dust, asbestos fibres or finely divided silicon dioxide, all of which can ultimately be fatal if inhaled. Corrosive chemicals possess physical toxicity because they destroy tissues, but are not directly poisonous unless they interfere directly with biological activity. Water can act as a physical toxicant if taken in extremely high doses because the concentration of vital ions decreases dramatically with too much water in the body. Asphyxiant gases can be considered physical toxicants because they act by displacing oxygen in the environment but they are inert, not chemically toxic gases.

Radiation can have a toxic effect on organisms.

Behavioral toxicity refers to the undesirable effects of essentially therapeutic levels of medication clinically indicated for a given disorder. These undesirable effects include anticholinergic effects, alpha-adrenergic blockade, and dopaminergic effects, among others.

== Measuring ==
Toxicity can be measured by its effects on the target (organism, organ, tissue or cell). Because individuals typically have different levels of response to the same dose of a toxic substance, a population-level measure of toxicity is often used which relates the probabilities of an outcome for a given individual in a population. One such measure is the LD_{50}. When such data does not exist, estimates are made by comparison to known similar toxic things, or to similar exposures in similar organisms. Then, "safety factors" are added to account for uncertainties in data and evaluation processes. For example, if a dose of a toxic substance is safe for a laboratory rat, one might assume that one-tenth that dose would be safe for a human, allowing a safety factor of 10 to allow for interspecies differences between two mammals; if the data are from fish, one might use a factor of 100 to account for the greater difference between two chordate classes (fish and mammals). Similarly, an extra protection factor may be used for individuals believed to be more susceptible to toxic effects such as in pregnancy or with certain diseases. Or, a newly synthesized and previously unstudied chemical that is believed to be very similar in effect to another compound could be assigned an additional protection factor of 10 to account for possible differences in effects that are probably much smaller. This approach is very approximate, but such protection factors are deliberately very conservative, and the method has been found to be useful in a wide variety of applications.

Assessing all aspects of the toxicity of cancer-causing agents involves additional issues, since it is not certain if there is a minimal effective dose for carcinogens, or whether the risk is just too small to see. In addition, it is possible that a single cell transformed into a cancer cell is all it takes to develop the full effect (the "one hit" theory).

It is more difficult to determine the toxicity of chemical mixtures than a pure chemical because each component displays its own toxicity, and components may interact to produce enhanced or diminished effects. Common mixtures include gasoline, cigarette smoke, and industrial waste. Even more complex are situations with more than one type of toxic entity, such as the discharge from a malfunctioning sewage treatment plant, with both chemical and biological agents.

The preclinical toxicity testing on various biological systems reveals the species-, organ- and dose-specific toxic effects of an investigational product. The toxicity of substances can be observed by (a) studying the accidental exposures to a substance (b) in vitro studies using cells/ cell lines (c) in vivo exposure on experimental animals. Toxicity tests are mostly used to examine specific adverse events or specific endpoints such as cancer, cardiotoxicity, and skin/eye irritation. Toxicity testing also helps calculate the No Observed Adverse Effect Level (NOAEL) dose and is helpful for clinical studies.

== Classification ==
The international pictogram for toxic chemicals.

For substances to be regulated and handled appropriately they must be properly classified and labelled. Classification is determined by approved testing measures or calculations and has determined cut-off levels set by governments and scientists (for example, no-observed-adverse-effect levels, threshold limit values, and tolerable daily intake levels). Pesticides provide the example of well-established toxicity class systems and toxicity labels. While currently many countries have different regulations regarding the types of tests, numbers of tests and cut-off levels, the implementation of the Globally Harmonized System has begun unifying these countries.

Global classification looks at three areas: physical hazards (explosions and pyrotechnics), health hazards and environmental hazards.

=== Health hazards ===
The types of toxicities where substances may cause lethality to the entire body, lethality to specific organs, major/minor damage, or cause cancer. These are globally accepted definitions of what toxicity is. Anything falling outside of the definition cannot be classified as that type of toxicant.

==== Acute toxicity ====
Acute toxicity looks at lethal effects following oral, dermal or inhalation exposure. It is split into five categories of severity where Category 1 requires the least amount of exposure to be lethal and Category 5 requires the most exposure to be lethal. The table below shows the upper limits for each category.

Method of administration	Category 1	Category 2	Category 3	Category 4	Category 5
Oral: LD_{50} measured in mg/kg of bodyweight	7	50	300	2 000	5 000
Dermal: LD_{50} measured in mg/kg of bodyweight	50	200	1 000	2 000	5 000
Gas Inhalation: LC_{50} measured in ppmV	100	500	2 500	20 000	Undefined
Vapour Inhalation: LC_{50} measured in mg/L	0.5	2.0	10	20	Undefined
Dust and Mist Inhalation: LC_{50} measured in mg/L	0.05	0.5	1.0	5.0	Undefined

Note: The undefined values are expected to be roughly equivalent to the category 5 values for oral and dermal administration.

==== Other methods of exposure and severity ====
Skin corrosion and irritation are determined through a skin patch test analysis, similar to an allergic inflammation patch test. This examines the severity of the damage done; when it is incurred and how long it remains; whether it is reversible and how many test subjects were affected.

Skin corrosion from a substance must penetrate through the epidermis into the dermis within four hours of application and must not reverse the damage within 14 days. Skin irritation shows damage less severe than corrosion if: the damage occurs within 72 hours of application; or for three consecutive days after application within a 14-day period; or causes inflammation which lasts for 14 days in two test subjects. Mild skin irritation is minor damage (less severe than irritation) within 72 hours of application or for three consecutive days after application.

Serious eye damage involves tissue damage or degradation of vision which does not fully reverse in 21 days. Eye irritation involves changes to the eye which do fully reverse within 21 days.

==== Other categories ====
- Respiratory sensitizers cause breathing hypersensitivity when the substance is inhaled.
- A substance which is a skin sensitizer causes an allergic response from a dermal application.
- Carcinogens induce cancer, or increase the likelihood of cancer occurring.
- Neurotoxicity is a form of toxicity in which a biological, chemical, or physical agent produces an adverse effect on the structure or function of the central or peripheral nervous system. It occurs when exposure to a substance – specifically, a neurotoxin or neurotoxicant– alters the normal activity of the nervous system in such a way as to cause permanent or reversible damage to nervous tissue.
- Reproductively toxic substances cause adverse effects in either sexual function or fertility to either a parent or the offspring.
- Specific-target organ toxins damage only specific organs.
- Aspiration hazards are solids or liquids which can cause damage through inhalation.

=== Environmental hazards ===
An environmental hazard can be defined as any condition, process, or state adversely affecting the environment. These hazards can be physical or chemical, and present in air, water, and/or soil. These conditions can cause extensive harm to humans and other organisms within an ecosystem.

==== Common types of environmental hazards ====
- Water: detergents, fertilizer, raw sewage, prescription medication, pesticides, herbicides, heavy metals, PCBs
- Soil: heavy metals, herbicides, pesticides, PCBs
- Air: particulate matter, carbon monoxide, sulfur dioxide, nitrogen dioxide, asbestos, ground-level ozone, lead (from aircraft fuel, mining, and industrial processes)

The EPA maintains a list of priority pollutants for testing and regulation.

==== Occupational hazards ====
Workers in various occupations may be at a greater level of risk for several types of toxicity, including neurotoxicity. The expression "Mad as a hatter" and the "Mad Hatter" of the book Alice in Wonderland derive from the known occupational toxicity of hatters who used a toxic chemical for controlling the shape of hats. Exposure to chemicals in the workplace environment may be required for evaluation by industrial hygiene professionals.

===== Hazards in the arts =====
Hazards in the arts have been an issue for artists for centuries, even though the toxicity of their tools, methods, and materials was not always adequately realized. Lead and cadmium, among other toxic elements, were often incorporated into the names of artist's oil paints and pigments, for example, "lead white" and "cadmium red".

20th-century printmakers and other artists began to be aware of the toxic substances, toxic techniques, and toxic fumes in glues, painting mediums, pigments, and solvents, many of which in their labelling gave no indication of their toxicity. An example was the use of xylol for cleaning silk screens. Painters began to notice the dangers of breathing painting mediums and thinners such as turpentine. Aware of toxicants in studios and workshops, in 1998 printmaker Keith Howard published Non-Toxic Intaglio Printmaking which detailed twelve innovative Intaglio-type printmaking techniques including photo etching, digital imaging, acrylic-resist hand-etching methods, and introducing a new method of non-toxic lithography.

==== Mapping environmental hazards ====
There are many environmental health mapping tools. TOXMAP is a Geographic Information System (GIS) from the Division of Specialized Information Services of the United States National Library of Medicine (NLM) that uses maps of the United States to help users visually explore data from the United States Environmental Protection Agency's (EPA) Toxics Release Inventory and Superfund programs. TOXMAP is a resource funded by the US Federal Government. TOXMAP's chemical and environmental health information is taken from NLM's Toxicology Data Network (TOXNET) and PubMed, and from other authoritative sources.

==== Aquatic toxicity ====
Aquatic toxicity testing subjects key indicator species of fish or crustacea to certain concentrations of a substance in their environment to determine the lethality level. Fish are exposed for 96 hours while crustacea are exposed for 48 hours. While GHS does not define toxicity past 100 mg/L, the EPA currently lists aquatic toxicity as "practically non-toxic" in concentrations greater than 100 ppm.

Exposure	Category 1	Category 2	Category 3
Acute	≤ 1.0 mg/L	≤ 10 mg/L	≤ 100 mg/L
Chronic	≤ 1.0 mg/L	≤ 10 mg/L	≤ 100 mg/L

Note: A category 4 is established for chronic exposure, but simply contains any toxic substance which is mostly insoluble, or has no data for acute toxicity.

== Factors influencing toxicity ==
Toxicity of a substance can be affected by many different factors, such as the pathway of administration (whether the toxicant is applied to the skin, ingested, inhaled, injected), the time of exposure (a brief encounter or long term), the number of exposures (a single dose or multiple doses over time), the physical form of the toxicant (solid, liquid, gas), the concentration of the substance, and in the case of gases, the partial pressure (at high ambient pressure, partial pressure will increase for a given concentration as a gas fraction), the genetic makeup of an individual, an individual's overall health, and many others. Several of the terms used to describe these factors have been included here.

Acute exposure
A single exposure to a toxic substance which may result in severe biological harm or death; acute exposures are usually characterized as lasting no longer than a day.
Chronic exposure
Continuous exposure to a toxicant over an extended period of time, often measured in months or years; it can cause irreversible side effects.

== Alternatives to dose-response framework ==
Considering the limitations of the dose-response concept, a novel Abstract Drug Toxicity Index (DTI) has been proposed recently. DTI redefines drug toxicity, identifies hepatotoxic drugs, gives mechanistic insights, predicts clinical outcomes and has potential as a screening tool.

== See also ==
- Agency for Toxic Substances and Disease Registry (ATSDR)
- Biological activity
- Biological warfare
- California Proposition 65 (1986)
- Carcinogen
- Drug overdose
- Drunkenness
- Indicative limit value
- List of highly toxic gases
- Material safety data sheet (MSDS)
- Mutagen
- Hepatotoxicity
- Nephrotoxicity
- Neurotoxicity
- Ototoxicity
- Paracelsus
- Physiologically-based pharmacokinetic modelling.
- Poison
- Reference dose
- Registry of Toxic Effects of Chemical Substances (RTECS) – toxicity database
- Soil contamination
- Teratogen
- Toxic tort
- Toxication
- Toxicophore
- Toxin
- Toxica, a disambiguation page
