= Reference dose =

Maximum acceptable oral dose of a toxic substance in the US

A reference dose is the United States Environmental Protection Agency's (EPA) maximum acceptable oral dose of a toxic substance, "below which no adverse noncancer health effects should result from a lifetime of exposure". Reference doses have been most commonly determined for pesticides. The EPA defines an oral reference dose (abbreviated RfD) as:

[A]n estimate, with uncertainty spanning perhaps an order of magnitude, of a daily oral exposure to the human population (including sensitive subgroups) that is likely to be without an appreciable risk of deleterious effects during a lifetime.

== Definition ==
The EPA defines a reference dose (abbreviated RfD) as the maximum acceptable oral dose of a toxic substance, below which no adverse non cancerous health effects should result from a lifetime of exposure. It is an estimate, with uncertainty spanning perhaps an order of magnitude, of a daily oral exposure to the human population (including sensitive subgroups) that is likely to be without an appreciable risk of deleterious effects during a lifetime.

== Regulatory status ==
RfDs are not enforceable standards, unlike National Ambient Air Quality Standards. RfDs are risk assessment benchmarks, and the EPA tries to set other regulations, so that people are not exposed to chemicals in amounts that exceed RfDs. According to the EPA from 2008, "[a]n aggregate daily exposure to a [chemical] at or below the RfD (expressed as 100 percent or less of the RfD) is generally considered acceptable by EPA." States can set their own RfDs.

For example, the EPA set an acute RfD for children of 0.0015 mg/kg/day for the organochlorine insecticide endosulfan, based on neurological effects observed in test animals. The EPA then looked at dietary exposure to endosulfan, and found that for the most exposed 0.1 % of children age 1–6, their daily consumption of the endosulfan exceeded this RfD. To remedy this, the EPA revoked the use of endosulfan on the crops that contributed the most to exposure of children: certain beans, peas, spinach, and grapes.

== Types ==
Reference doses are chemical-specific, i.e. the EPA determines a unique reference dose for every substance it evaluates. Often separate acute (0-1 month)and chronic RfDs (more than one month) are determined for the same substance. Reference doses are specific to dietary exposure. When assessing inhalation exposure, EPA uses "reference concentrations" (RfCs), instead of RfDs. RfDs apply only to non-cancer effects. When evaluating carcinogenic effects, the EPA uses the Q_{1}* method.

=== Safe Drinking Water Act ===
Under the Safe Drinking Water Act, EPA is required to first develop a maximum contaminant level goal (MCLG) for an individual chemical, before development of a regulatory standard. The MCLG is the highest level of a contaminant in drinking water where there is no known or anticipated health effect. EPA calculates a "Drinking Water Equivalent Level" (DWEL) by multiplying the RfD by body weight, divided by daily water consumption. The DWEL is then multiplied by the percentage of total drinking water exposure for the general population. The agency uses the MCLG to develop a "maximum contaminant level", which is an enforceable standard applicable to public water systems.

== Determination ==
RfDs are usually derived from animal studies. Animals (typically rats) are dosed with varying amounts of the substance in question, and the largest dose at which no effects are observed is identified. This dose level is called the No observable effect level, or NOEL. To account for the fact that humans may be more or less susceptible than the test animal, a 10-fold "uncertainty factor" is usually applied to the NOEL. This uncertainty factor is called the "interspecies uncertainty factor" or UF_{inter}. An additional 10-fold uncertainty factor, the "intraspecies uncertainty factor" or UF_{intra}, is usually applied to account for the fact that some humans may be substantially more sensitive to the effects of substances than others. Additional uncertainty factors may also be applied. In general:

$$\mathrm{RfD} \mathrm{(mg/kg/day)} = {\mathrm{NOEL} \mathrm{(mg/kg/day)} \over \mathrm{UF}_{\mathrm{inter}} \cdot \mathrm{UF}_{\mathrm{intra}} \cdot \mathrm{UF}_{\mathrm{other}}}$$

Frequently, a "lowest-observed-adverse-effect level" or LOAEL is used in place of a NOEL. If adverse effects are observed at all dose levels tested, then the smallest dose tested, the LOAEL, is used to calculate the RfD. An additional uncertainty factor usually applied in these cases, since the NOAEL, by definition, would be lower than the LOAEL had it been observed. If studies using human subjects are used to determine a RfD, then the interspecies uncertainty factor can be reduced to 1, but generally the 10-fold intraspecies uncertainty factor is retained. Such studies are rare.

== Example ==
As an example, consider the following determination of the RfD for the insecticide chlorpyrifos, adapted from the EPA's Interim Reregistration Eligibility Decision for chlorpyrifos.

The EPA determined the acute RfD to be 0.005 mg/kg/day based on a study in which male rats were administered a one-time dose of chlorpyrifos and blood cholinesterase activity was monitored. Cholinesterase inhibition was observed at all dose levels tested, the lowest of which was 1.5 mg/kg. This level was thus identified at the lowest observed adverse effect level (LOAEL). A NOAEL of 0.5 mg/kg was estimated by dividing the LOAEL by a three-fold uncertainty factor. The NOAEL was then divided by the standard 10-fold inter- and 10-fold intraspecies uncertainty factors to arrive at the RfD of 0.005 mg/kg/day. Other studies showed that fetuses and children are even more sensitive to chlorpyrifos than adults, so the EPA applies an additional ten-fold uncertainty factor to protect that subpopulation. A RfD that has been divided by an additional uncertainty factor that only applies to certain populations is called a "population adjusted dose" or PAD. For chlorpyrifos, the acute PAD (or "aPAD") is thus 5×10^{−4} mg/kg/day, and it applies to infants, children, and women who are breast feeding.

The EPA also determined a chronic RfD for chlorpyrifos exposure based on studies in which animals were administered low doses of the pesticide for two years. Cholinesterase inhibition was observed at all dose levels tested, and a NOAEL of 0.03 mg/kg/day estimated by dividing a LOAEL of 0.3 mg/kg/day by an uncertainty factor of 10. As with the acute RfD, the chronic RfD of 3×10^{−4} mg/kg/day was determined by dividing this NOAEL by the inter- and intraspecies uncertainty factors. The chronic PAD ("cPAD") of 3×10^{−5} mg/kg/day was determined by applying an additional 10-fold uncertainty factor to account for the increased susceptibility of infants and children. Like the aPAD, this cPAD applies to infants, children, and breast feeding women.

== Consensus ==
Because the RfD assumes "a dose below which no adverse noncarcinogenic health effects should result from a lifetime of exposure", the critical step in all chemical risk and regulatory threshold calculations is dependent upon a properly derived dose at which no observed adverse effects (NOAEL) were seen which is then divided by an uncertainty factor that considers inadequacies of the study, animal-to-human extrapolation, sensitive sub-populations, and inadequacies of the database. The RfD that is derived is not always agreed upon. Some may believe it to be overly protective while others may contend that it is not adequately protective of human health.

For example, in 2002 the EPA completed its draft toxicological review of perchlorate and proposed an RfD of 0.00003 milligrams per kilogram per day (mg/kg/day) based primarily on studies that identified neurodevelopmental deficits in rat pups. These deficits were linked to maternal exposure to perchlorate. Subsequently, the National Academy of Sciences (NAS) reviewed the health implications of perchlorate, and in 2005 proposed a much higher alternative reference dose of 0.0007 mg/kg/day based primarily on a 2002 study by Greer et al. During that study, 37 adult human subjects were split into four exposure groups exposed to 0.007 (7 subjects), 0.02 (10 subjects), 0.1 (10 subjects), and 0.5 (10 subjects) mg/kg/day. Significant decreases in iodide uptake were found in the three highest exposure groups. Iodide uptake was not significantly reduced in the lowest exposed group, but four of the seven subjects in this group experienced inhibited iodide uptake. In 2005, the RfD proposed by NAS was accepted by EPA and added to its integrated risk information system (IRIS).

In a 2005 article in the journal Environmental Health Perspectives (EHP), Gary Ginsberg and Deborah Rice argued, that the 2005 NAS RfD was not protective of human health based on the following:

1. The NAS report described the level of lowest exposure from Greer et al. as a NOEL. However, there was actually an effect at that level although not statistically significant largely due to small size of study population (four of seven subjects showed a slight decrease in iodide uptake).
2. Reduced iodide uptake was not considered to be an adverse effect even though it is a precursor to an adverse effect, hypothyroidism. Therefore, additional safety factors, they argued, are necessary when extrapolating from the point of departure to the RfD.
3. Consideration of data uncertainty was insufficient because the Greer, et al. study reflected only a 14-day exposure ( acute) to healthy adults and no additional safety factors were considered to protect sensitive subpopulations like for example, breastfeeding newborns.

Although there has generally been consensus with the Greer et al. study, there is no consensus with regard to developing a perchlorate RfD. One of the key differences results from how the point of departure is viewed (i.e., NOEL or LOAEL), or whether a benchmark dose should be used to derive the RfD. Defining the point of departure as a NOEL or LOAEL has implications when it comes to applying appropriate safety factors to the point of departure to derive the RfD.

In 2010, the Massachusetts Department of Environmental Protection set a 10 fold lower RfD (0.07 μg/kg/day) using a much higher uncertainty factor of 100. They also calculated an Infant drinking water value, which neither US EPA nor CalEPA have done.

== See also ==
- Dietary Reference Intake
- Acceptable daily intake
