= Dose (biochemistry) =

Measured quantity of a medicine, nutrient, or pathogen which is delivered as a unit

A dose is the quantity of a medication, nutrient, or pathogen to be given at one time, or the total quantity of a medication administered during a specified period of time. In nutrition, the term is usually applied to how much of a specific nutrient is in a person's diet or in a particular food, meal, or dietary supplement. For bacterial or viral agents, dose typically refers to the amount of the pathogen required to infect a host.

In clinical pharmacology, dose refers to the amount of drug administered to a person, and dosage is a fuller description that includes not only the dose (e.g., "500 mg") but also the frequency and duration of the treatment (e.g., "twice a day for one week"). Exposure is defined as the contact with or ingestion of substances, which can lead to a range of clinical presentations. This is in contrast to their interchangeable use in other fields.

== Factors affecting dose ==
A 'dose' of any chemical or biological agent (active ingredient) has several factors which are critical to its effectiveness. The first is concentration, that is, how much of the agent is being administered to the body at once. The response to concentration may be complex and is often nonlinear.

The second factor is the duration of exposure (latency). Some drugs or supplements have a slow-release feature also known as controlled release (CR), in which portions of the medication are metabolized at different times, which changes the impacts the active ingredients have on the body. CR systems can maintain a constant drug concentration over a prolonged period, reduce the frequency of dosing, minimize side effects and enhance the efficacy of the medication. They can be especially useful in place of drugs that need to be taken several times a day or for conditions that require a constant level of medicine in the bloodstream. When immediate release (IR) tablets are prescribed, the medication is released soon after pill ingestion so the drug can work quickly over a short period.

The third factor is the route of administration. Whether a drug is ingested orally, injected into a muscle or vein, absorbed through a mucous membrane, or any of the other types of administration routes, affects how quickly the substance will be metabolized by the body and thus effects the concentration of the active ingredient(s). Dose-response curves may illustrate the relationship of these metabolic effects. The choice of routes in which the medications are applied depends not only on convenience but also on the drug's properties and pharmacokinetics.

== Medicines ==
=== Over-the-counter medications ===
In over-the-counter medicines, both dose and dosage is usually based on age. Typically, different doses are recommended for children 6 years and under, for children aged 6 to 12 years, and for persons 12 years and older, but outside of those ranges the guidance is slim. This can lead to serial under- or over-dosing, as smaller people take more than they should and larger people take less. Over-the-counter medications may be accompanied by a set of instructions directing the patient to take a certain small dose, followed by another small dose if their symptoms don't subside.

=== Prescription drugs ===
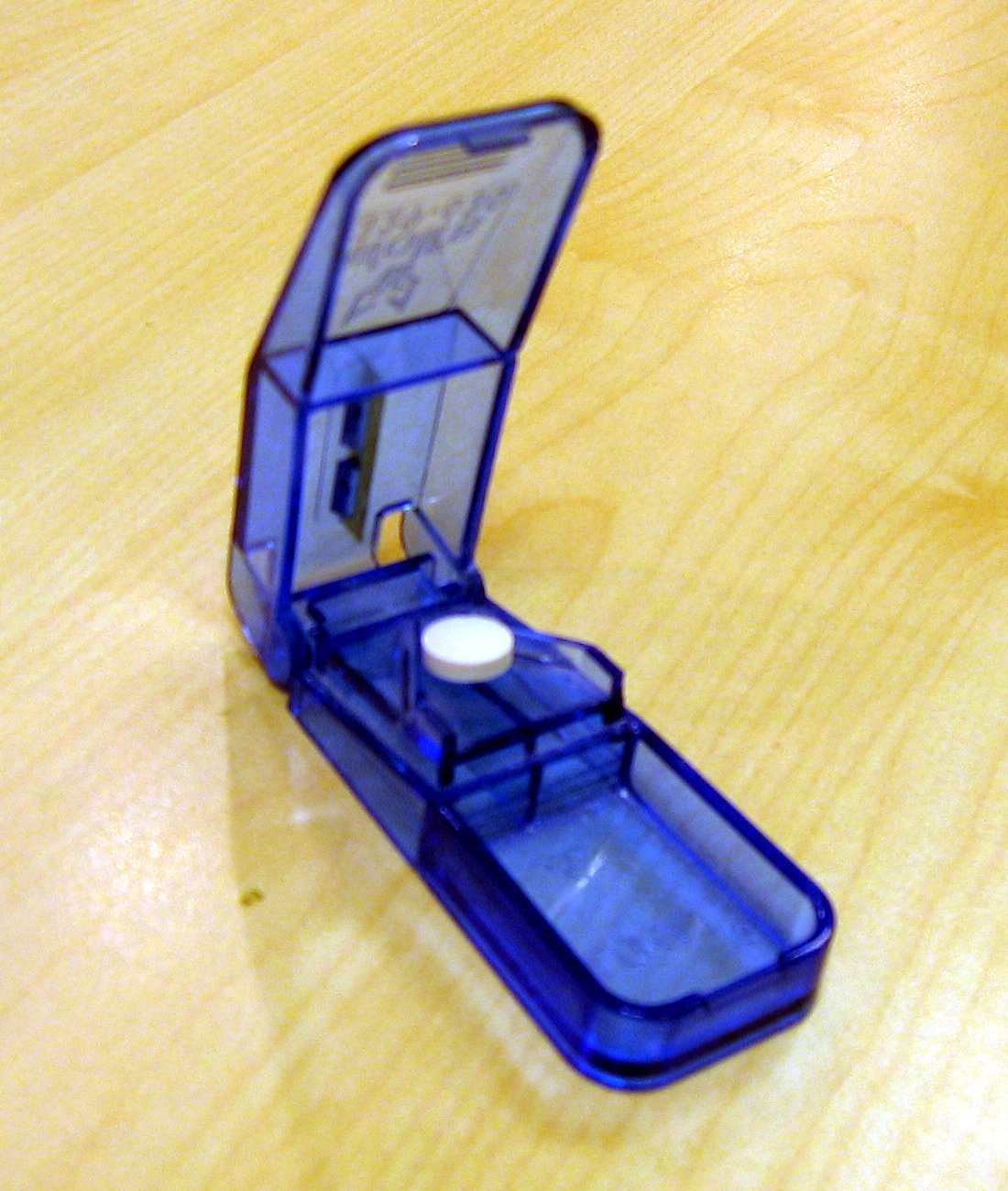
A pill splitter can be used to divide some tablets in half. This cuts the dose in half.

Prescription drug doses are often based on body weight. Drugs come with a recommended dose in milligrams or micrograms per kilogram of body weight, and that is used in conjunction with the patient's age and body weight to determine a safe dose.

In single-dose scenarios, the patient's body weight and the drug's recommended dose per kilogram are used to determine a safe one-time dose. If multiple doses of treatment are needed in a day, the physician must take into account information regarding the total amount of the drug which is safe to use in one day, and how that should be broken up into intervals for the most effective treatment for the patient. For example, if the desired total daily amount is 600 mg per day, they may decide a dosage plan that has one 200 mg dose taken three times a day, or one 300 mg dose taken twice a day, or a single 600 mg dose take once a day.

Medication underdosing occurs commonly when physicians write prescriptions that are correct for a certain time, but fails to increase the dose as the patient needs (i.e. weight-based dosing in children, or increasing dose of chemotherapy drugs if a patient's condition worsens).

=== Medical cannabis ===
Medical cannabis is used to treat the symptoms of a wide variety of diseases and conditions. The dose of cannabis depends on the individual, the condition being treated, and the ratio of cannabidiol (CBD) to tetrahydrocannabinol (THC) in the cannabis. CBD is a chemical component of cannabis that is not intoxicating and used to treat conditions like epilepsy and other neuropsychiatric disorders. THC is a chemical component of cannabis that is psychoactive. It has been used to treat nausea and discomfort in cancer patients receiving chemotherapy treatment. For anxiety, depression, and other mental health ailments, a CBD to THC ratio of 10 to 1 is recommended. For cancer and neurological conditions, a CBD to THC ratio of 1 to 1 is recommended. The correct dose depends on each individual's reaction to both chemicals, and therefore the dosing must be continually adjusted once treatment is initiated to find the right balance.

There is limited consensus throughout the scientific community regarding the effectiveness of medicinal cannabis.

=== Cancer ===
Calculating drug doses for treatment for more serious diseases like cancer is commonly done through measuring the patient's body surface area. There are approximately 25 different formulae for measuring a patient's body surface area, none of them exact. Studies show that selecting the best method for an individual patient is a difficult task; consequently, people may receive somewhat too much or too little medication due to their particular physical anomalies. Therefore, these formulas are typically adjusted by what is known as 'toxicity-adjusting dosing,' whereby physicians monitor immune suppression and adjust dosing accordingly. Because this strategy of trial and error requires close monitoring, it is inefficient, risky, and cost ineffective. Research into the development of safer and more accurate dosing methods is ongoing.

=== Ongoing research ===
Another approach that's been investigated recently is dosing on a molecular level, either through conventional delivery systems, nanoparticle drug delivery, light-triggered delivery, or other methods. By combining these drugs with a system that detects the concentration of drug particles in the blood, proper dosing could be achieved for each individual patient. Research in this field was initiated with monitoring of small-molecule cocaine levels in undiluted blood serum with electrochemical aptamer-based sensing. DNA aptamers, which are peptides that have with specific target molecules that they search for, fold in response to the molecule when they find it, and this technology was used in a microfluidic detection system to create an electrochemical signal that physicians can read. Researchers tested it on cocaine detection and found that it successfully found trace amounts of cocaine in blood.

This research was expanded upon and led to the creation of a product called MEDIC (microfluidic electrochemical detector for in vivo continuous monitoring) developed by faculty at the University of California at Santa Barbara. MEDIC is an instrument that can continuously determine the concentrations of different molecules in the blood. The blood doesn't have to be mixed with anything prior to testing to create a 'serum' as the first device did. MEDIC can detect a wide variety of drug molecules and biomarkers. In trials, early models of the device failed after about half an hour because the proteins in whole blood clung to the sensors and clogged the components. This problem was solved via a second chamber that allowed a liquid buffer to flow over the sensors with the blood, without mixing or disturbing the blood, so the results remained unchanged. The device is still in clinical trials and actual implementation in medicine is likely years away, however in the interim, its creators estimate that it could also be used in the pharmaceutical industry to allow for better testing in Phase 3 clinical trials.

== Vaccines ==
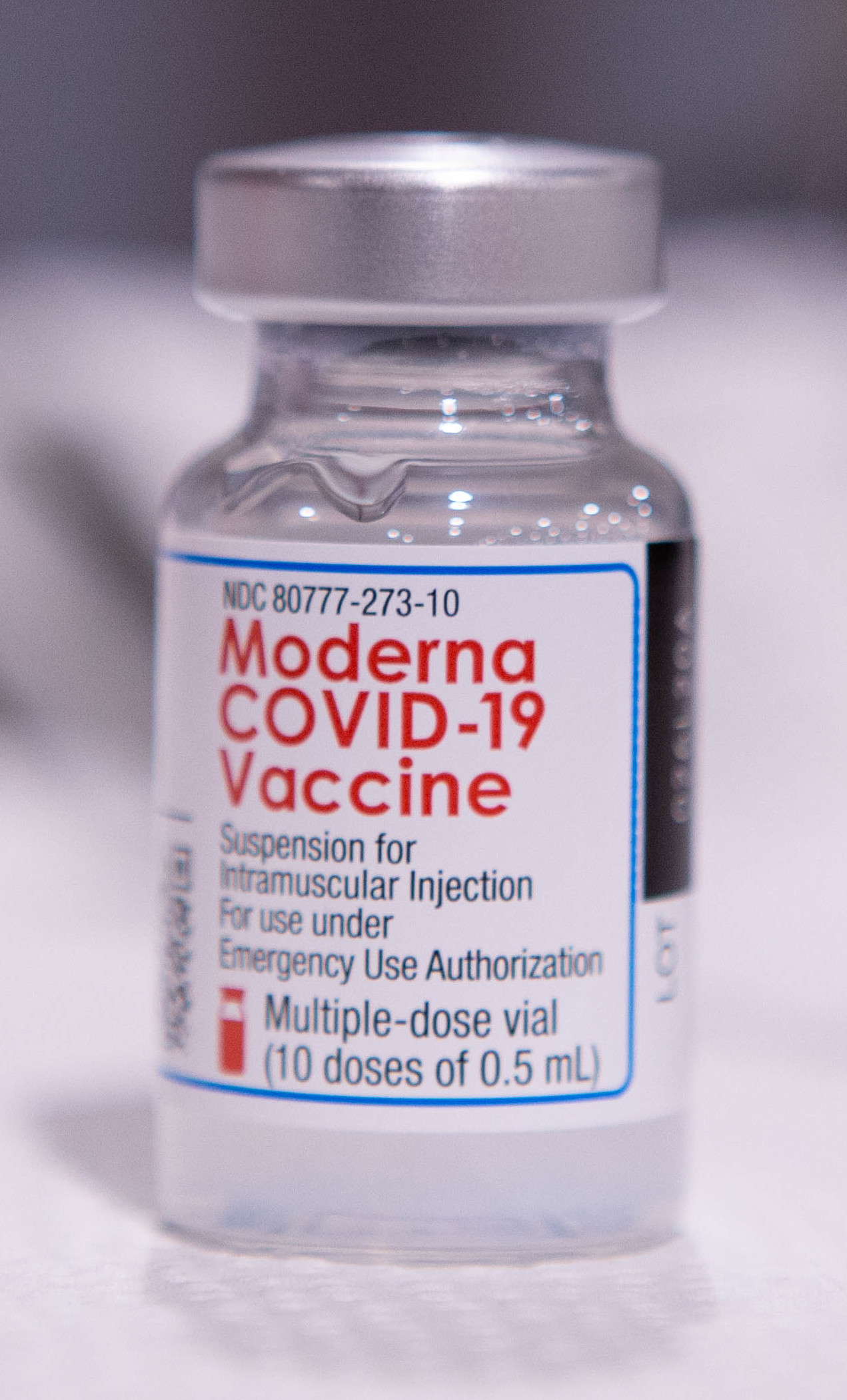
This 5 mL vial holds 10 doses of a COVID-19 vaccine.

Vaccinations are typically administered as liquids and dosed in milliliters. Each individual vaccine comes with constraints regarding at what age they should be administered, how many doses must be given, and over what period of time. There are 15 vaccines that the Centers for Disease Control and Prevention recommend every person (in the United States and Canada) receive between birth and 18 years of age to protect against various infectious agents that may affect long-term health. Most vaccines require multiple doses for full immunity, given in recommended intervals depending on the vaccine. There are several typical routes of administration for vaccines:

- Intramuscular: the needle is inserted perpendicular to the skin into the muscle, beneath the skin and (subcutaneous) tissues that rest on top.
- Subcutaneous: the needle is inserted at a 45-degree angle into the (subcutaneous) tissue between the outer layer of the skin and the muscle.
- Intranasal: the vaccine is sprayed into the nose and absorbed through the nasal passage.
- Oral: the vaccine is swallowed and ingested.

== Nutrition ==
For healthy humans, experts recommend daily intake quantities of certain vitamins and minerals. The Food and Nutrition Board, Institute of Medicine, and National Academy of Sciences sets a recommended Dietary Reference Intake (DRI) in several forms:

1. Recommended Dietary Allowance (RDA): average daily intake which adequately meets the nutrient requirements of 97-98% of healthy individuals.
2. Adequate Intake (AI): established when the evidence gathered for an RDA is inconclusive, An AI is assumed to recommend a daily amount to meet nutritional adequacy.
3. Tolerable Upper Intake Level (UL): maximum amount of a nutrient which can be consumed without causing adverse impacts to an individual's health.

DRIs are established for elements, vitamins, and macronutrients. Common elemental and vitamin doses are measured in milligrams per day (mg/d) or micrograms per day (μg/d). Common macronutrient doses are in grams per day (g/d). Recommended doses for all three are established by both gender and age.

Individuals take vitamin and mineral supplements to promote healthier lifestyles and prevent development of chronic diseases. There is no conclusive evidence linking continued vitamin and mineral supplement intake with longevity of life.

== Infectious dose ==
The infectious dose of a pathogen is the number of cells required to infect the host. All pathogens have an infectious dose typically given in number of cells. The infectious dose varies by organism and can be dependent on the specific type of strain. Some pathogens can infect a host with only a few cells, while others require millions or billions.

Examples of infectious doses, ranked loosely in increasing order:

- Enterohemorrhagic E. coli (causes hemorrhaging of the intestines): 10 bacteria cells
- Hepatitis A: 10–100 virus particles
- Norovirus (commonly called 'a stomach bug'): 10–100 virus particles
- Rotavirus (severe diarrhea, can be fatal): 10–100 virus particles
- Shigella (shigellosis): 500 bacteria cells
- Streptococcus pyogenes (Group A strep throat): 1000 bacteria cells
- Salmonella: varies by strain, 100–1 billion bacteria cells
- Vibrio cholerae (Cholera): 1000–100,000,000 bacteria cells

Typically, stomach acids can kill bacteria below the infectious dosing range for a given pathogen and keep the host from feeling symptoms or falling ill. Complexes constructed by fat can protect infectious agents from stomach acid, making fatty foods more likely to contain pathogens that successfully infect the host. For individuals with low or reduced stomach acid concentrations, in infectious dose for a pathogen will be lower than normal.

Rather than being administered by a physician or individual, infectious doses are transmitted to a person from other persons or the environment, are generally unintentional, and usually result in symptoms or other adverse effects until the pathogen is defeated by the individual's immune system or flushed out of the individual's system by excretory processes.

== Dosage Moderation ==
Though essential to the well being of the population, pharmaceuticals and nutrients can have adverse effects when taken in large quantities. Because of this, the U.S. Environmental Protection Agency requires that no particular dosage exceeds a certain limit when administered utilizing certain guidelines. Reference Doses (RfD) are valuable restrictions that prevent drugs from being given in quantities that can harm patients. RfD's are determined in a variety of ways, with the most common being development from existing studies.

Toxicity testing, for example, gives insight on how a dosage may affect a human being in measurements of NOAEL or LOAEL, or No/Lowest Observable Adverse Exposure Limit. These tests are dependent on how animal/human cells will react to a particular dose of a chemical. However, due to these values being experimental and largely based on cells different to those of the average human, the results of suggested moderation are often debated.

== See also ==
- Toxicology – study of toxic substances, including what dose produces toxic effects
- Drug overdose – excessive intake of pharmaceutical agents, producing toxic effects
