= Tar melanosis =

- Other names: Melanodermatitis toxica lichenoides
- Specialty: Dermatology

Tar melanosis is an occupational dermatosis that occurs among tar handlers after several years of exposure, characterized by a severe widespread itching that is soon followed by the appearance of reticular pigmentation, telangiectases, and a shiny appearance of the skin.

== See also ==
- Skin lesion
