= Dosage (pharmacology) =

Medication prescription in pharmacology

In pharmacology and medicine, dosage refers to the prescribed regimen for administering a medication or substance, encompassing the amount, frequency, and duration of use. It is distinct from dose, which denotes a single, specific quantity of a drug or substance given at one time. Dosage typically includes information on the number of doses, intervals between administrations, and the overall treatment period. For example, a dosage might be described as "200 mg twice daily for two weeks," where 200 mg represents the individual dose, twice daily indicates the frequency, and two weeks specifies the duration of treatment.
