= Chronic toxicity =

Adverse effects of long term exposure to a contaminant

Chronic toxicity, the development of adverse effects as a result of long term exposure to a contaminant or other stressor, is an important aspect of aquatic toxicology. Adverse effects associated with chronic toxicity can be directly lethal but are more commonly sublethal, including changes in growth, reproduction, or behavior. Chronic toxicity is in contrast to acute toxicity, which occurs over a shorter period of time to higher concentrations. Various toxicity tests can be performed to assess the chronic toxicity of different contaminants, and usually last at least 10% of an organism's lifespan. Results of aquatic chronic toxicity tests can be used to determine water quality guidelines and regulations for protection of aquatic organisms.

== Definition ==
Chronic toxicity is the development of adverse effects as the result of long term exposure to a toxicant or other stressor. It can manifest as direct lethality but more commonly refers to sublethal endpoints such as decreased growth, reduced reproduction, or behavioral changes such as impacted swimming performance.

== Common aquatic tests ==
Chronic toxicity tests are performed to determine the long term toxicity potential of toxicants or other stressors, commonly to aquatic organisms. Examples of common aquatic chronic toxicity test organisms, durations, and endpoints include:

- Fathead minnow, Pimephales promelas, larval survival and growth
- Daphnia, Daphnia magna, 21-d survival and reproduction
- Green algae, Raphidocelis subcapitata, 72-h growth
- Amphipod, Hyalella azteca, 42-d survival, growth, and reproduction

== Application of test results ==
Results from chronic toxicity tests can be used to calculate values that can be used for determining water quality standards. These include:

=== NOEC/LOEC ===
The no observed effects concentration (NOEC) is determined as the highest tested concentration that shows no statistically significant difference from the control. The lowest observed effects concentration (LOEC) is the lowest concentration of those tested that produced a statistically significant difference from the control. NOECs and LOECs can be derived from both acute and chronic tests and are used by agencies to set water quality standards.

=== MATC/CV ===
The maximum acceptable toxicant concentration (MATC) is calculated as the geometric mean of the NOEC and LOEC. MATC is sometimes called the chronic value (CV) and defined as “the concentration (threshold) at which chronic effects are first observed”.

=== PEC/PNEC ===
The predicted no effects concentration (PNEC) is calculated from toxicity tests to determine the concentration that is not thought to cause adverse effects to aquatic organisms. Determination of aquatic PNEC values requires toxicity test results from freshwater fish (e.g. ‘‘Pimephales promelas’’), freshwater invertebrates (e.g. ‘‘Daphnia magna’’), and freshwater algae (e.g. ‘‘Raphidocelis subcapitata’’) The probable effects concentration (PEC), the concentration predicted to be in the environment, is compared with the PNEC in risk assessment. The PEC takes into account both acute and chronic exposures to toxicants.

=== ACR/AF ===
The acute to chronic ratio (ACR) allows for an estimation of Chronic toxicity using acute toxicity data. It is calculated by dividing the LC50 by the MATC. The inverse of this (MATC/LC50) is termed the application factor (AF). AFs can be used when chronic toxicity data is not known for a specific species.

== Challenges with testing ==
The chronic toxicity of toxicants is useful information to know in determining water quality guidelines, but this information is not always easily obtained. Chronic toxicity tests can be costly and difficult, due to challenges in keeping control organisms alive, maintaining water quality, retaining constant chemical exposures, and the sheer time required for tests. Because of this, acute toxicity tests are more commonly employed, and ACRs and AFs are used to estimate chronic toxicity of toxicants to organisms.

== Factors that influence toxicity ==
There are many factors that can increase or decrease the toxicity of toxicants or stressors, making interpretation of test results difficult. These can be chemical, biological, or toxicological.

=== Chemical factors ===
Water chemistry plays an important role in the toxicity of certain toxicants. This includes pH, salinity, water hardness, conductivity, temperature, and amounts of dissolved organic carbon (DOC) For instance, the toxicity of copper is decreased with increasing amounts of DOC, as described by the biotic ligand model (BLM).

=== Biological factors ===
Chronic toxicity will vary with differences in organisms, including species, size, and age. Certain species are more susceptible to toxic effects, as shown in species sensitivity distributions (SSDs). Certain life stages are more susceptible to adverse effects, which is why early life stage (ELS) toxicity tests are performed for certain aquatic species. In addition, other physical factors, like organism size, can lead to differences in response to toxicants.

== Examples for use in water quality guidelines ==
Water quality guidelines are determined based on the results of both acute and chronic toxicity tests. Criteria maximum concentrations (CMCs) are obtained from acute toxicity tests, whereas criteria continuous concentrations (CCCs) are obtained from chronic toxicity tests. They are values determined by the U.S. EPA to be protective of aquatic organisms.

== See also ==
- Aquatic toxicology
- Environmental toxicology
- Ecotoxicology
- Toxicology
- Acute toxicity
