= Acute toxicity =

Adverse effects of a substance that result either from a single exposure

Acute toxicity describes the adverse effects of a substance that result either from a single exposure or from multiple exposures in a short period of time (usually less than 24 hours). To be described as acute toxicity, the adverse effects should occur within 14 days of the administration of the substance.

Acute toxicity is distinguished from chronic toxicity, which describes the adverse health effects from repeated exposures, often at lower levels, to a substance over a longer time period (months or years).

It is widely considered unethical to use humans as test subjects for acute (or chronic) toxicity research. However, some information can be gained from investigating accidental human exposures (e.g., factory accidents). Otherwise, most acute toxicity data comes from animal testing or, more recently, in vitro testing methods and inference from data on similar substances.

== Measures of acute toxicity ==
=== Regulatory values ===
Limits for short-term exposure, such as STELs or CVs, are defined only if there is a particular acute toxicity associated with a substance. These limits are set by the American Conference of Governmental Industrial Hygienists (ACGIH) and the Occupational Safety and Health Administration (OSHA), based on experimental data. The values set by these organizations do not always coincide exactly, and in the chemical industry it is general practice to choose the most conservative value in order to ensure the safety of employees. The values can typically be found in a material safety data sheet. There are also different values based on the method of entry of the compound (oral, dermal, or inhalation).

- Threshold limit value-time-weighted-average: The maximum concentration to which a worker can be exposed every work day (8 hours) and experience no adverse health effects.
- Short-Term Exposure Limit, STEL or Threshold limit value-short-term exposure limit, TLV-STEL: The concentration which no person should be exposed to for more than 15 minutes during an 8-hour work day.
- Ceiling value, CV or Threshold limit value-ceiling, TLV-C: The concentration which no person should ever be exposed to.

=== Experimental values ===
- No-observed-adverse-effect level, NOAEL
- Lowest-observed-adverse-effect level, LOAEL
- Maximum tolerable concentration, MTC, LC_{0}; Maximum tolerable dose, MTD, LD_{0}
- Minimum lethal concentration, LC_{min}; Minimum lethal dose, LD_{min}
- Median lethal concentration, LC_{50}; Median lethal dose, LD_{50}; Median lethal time, LT_{50} (LT50)
- Absolute lethal concentration, LC_{100}; Absolute lethal dose, LD_{100}

The most referenced value in the chemical industry is the median lethal dose, or LD50. This is the concentration of substance which resulted in the death of 50% of test subjects (typically mice or rats) in the laboratory.

== Responses and treatments ==
When a person has been exposed to an acutely toxic dose of a substance, they can be treated in a number of ways in order to minimize the harmful effects. The severity of the response is related to the severity of the toxic response exhibited. These treatment methods include (but are not limited to):

- Emergency showers used for removing irritating or hazardous chemicals from the skin.
- Emergency eye washes used for removing any irritating or hazardous chemicals from the eyes.
- Activated charcoal used to bind and remove harmful substances consumed orally. This is used as an alternative to conventional stomach pumping.
