= Lowest-observed-adverse-effect level =

Hypothetical dose-response showing LOAEL

The lowest-observed-adverse-effect level (LOAEL), or the lowest-observed-adverse-effect concentration (LOAEC), is the lowest concentration or amount of a substance found by experiment or observation that causes an adverse alteration of morphology, function, capacity, growth, development, or lifespan of a target organism distinguished from normal organisms of the same species under defined conditions of exposure. Federal agencies use the LOAEL during risk assessment to set approval standards below this level.

The United States Environmental Protection Agency defines LOAEL as the 'lowest level of a chemical stressor evaluated in a toxicity test that shows harmful effects on a plant or animal. While LOAELs and LOAECs are similar, they are not interchangeable. A LOAEL refers to a dose of chemical that is ingested, while a LOAEC refers to direct exposure to a chemical (e.g., through gills or the skin).

== See also ==
- No-observed-adverse-effect level
- Reference dose
