= Fish products =

Food product produced from fish

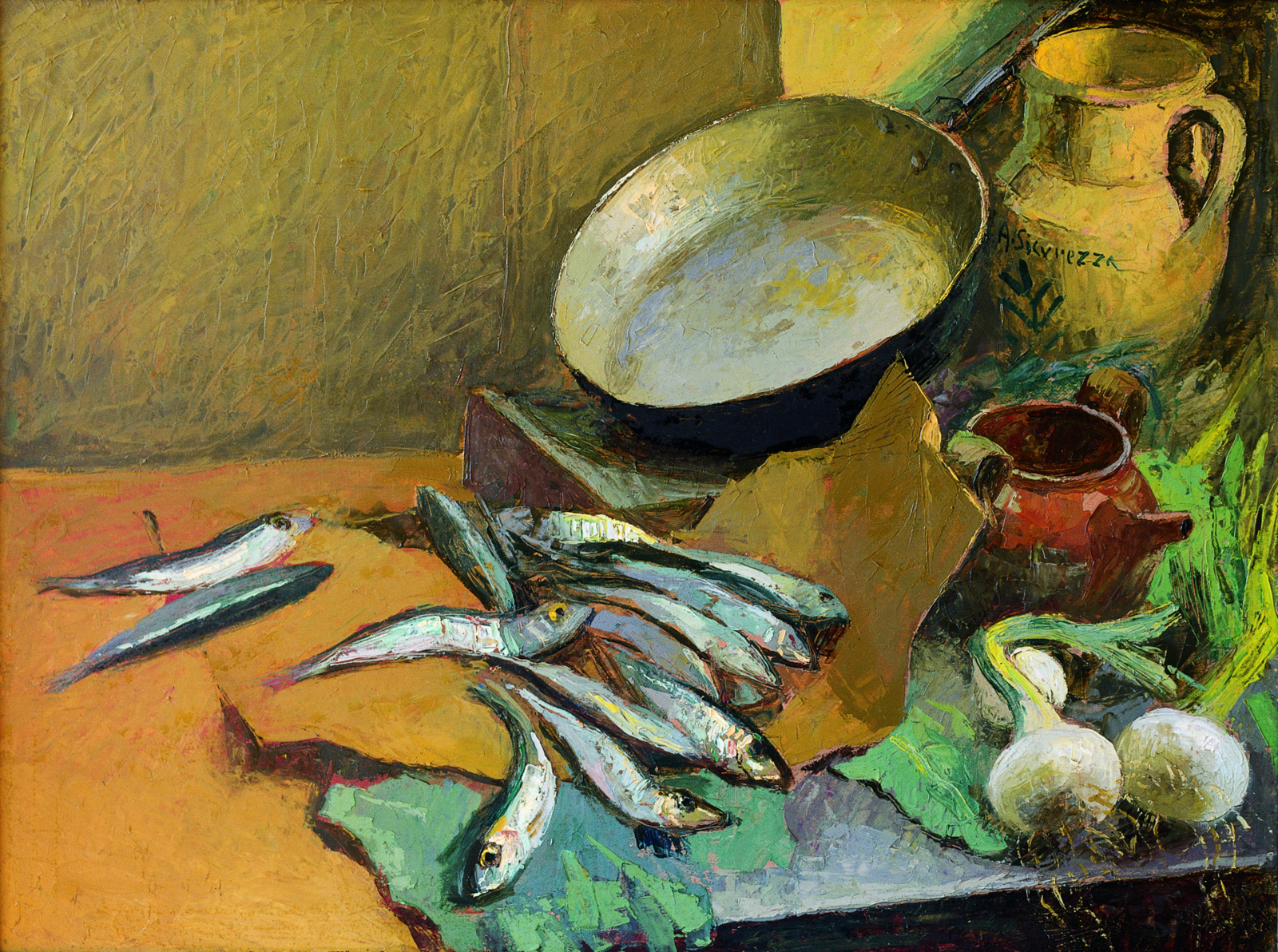
Antonio Sicurezza, still-life with anchovies (1972)

Fish and fish products are used worldwide as food, as fertilizer, as feedstocks, and for other purposes. With other seafoods, they provide the world's prime source of high-quality protein, being 14 to 16 percent of the animal protein consumed worldwide. Over one billion people rely on fish as their primary source of animal protein. Fish and other aquatic organisms are processed into various food and non-food products. Fish may also be collected live for research, observation, or for the aquarium trade.

Live, fresh or chilled is often the most preferred and highly priced form of fish and represents the largest share of fish for direct human consumption, 45 percent in 2016, followed by frozen (31 percent), prepared and preserved (12 percent) and cured (dried, salted, in brine, fermented smoked) (12 percent). Freezing represents the main method of processing fish for human consumption; it accounted for 56 percent of total processed fish for human consumption and 27 percent of total fish production in 2016.

Major improvements in processing as well as in refrigeration, ice-making and transportation have allowed increasing commercialization and distribution of fish in a greater variety of product forms in the past few decades. However, developing countries still mainly use fish in live or fresh form (53 percent of the fish destined for human consumption in 2016), soon after landing or harvesting from aquaculture. Loss or wastage between landing and consumption decreased, but still accounts for an estimated 27 percent of landed fish.

== History ==
In Ancient Roman society, garum, a type of fish sauce condiment, was popular.

Sharkskin and rayskin which are covered with, in effect, tiny teeth (dermal denticles) were formerly used in the same manner as sandpaper is in the modern era. These skins are also used to make leather. Rayskin leather (same'gawa) is used in the manufacture of hilts of traditional Japanese swords. Some other species of fish are also used to make fish leather, and this material is more and more popular among luxury brands such as Prada, Dior, Fendi, and also emerging designers. Thus, it is now possible to wear shoes made of salmon leather, a jacket made of perch leather, or a handbag made of wolffish or cod leather. Once tanned, the leather is non-odorous and is stronger than other, traditional, leathers of similar thickness.

The flesh of many fish are primarily valued as a source of food; there are many edible species of fish, and many fish produce edible roe. Other marine life taken as food includes shellfish, crustaceans, and sea cucumber. Sea plants such as kombu are used in some regional cuisine.

== Processed fish products ==
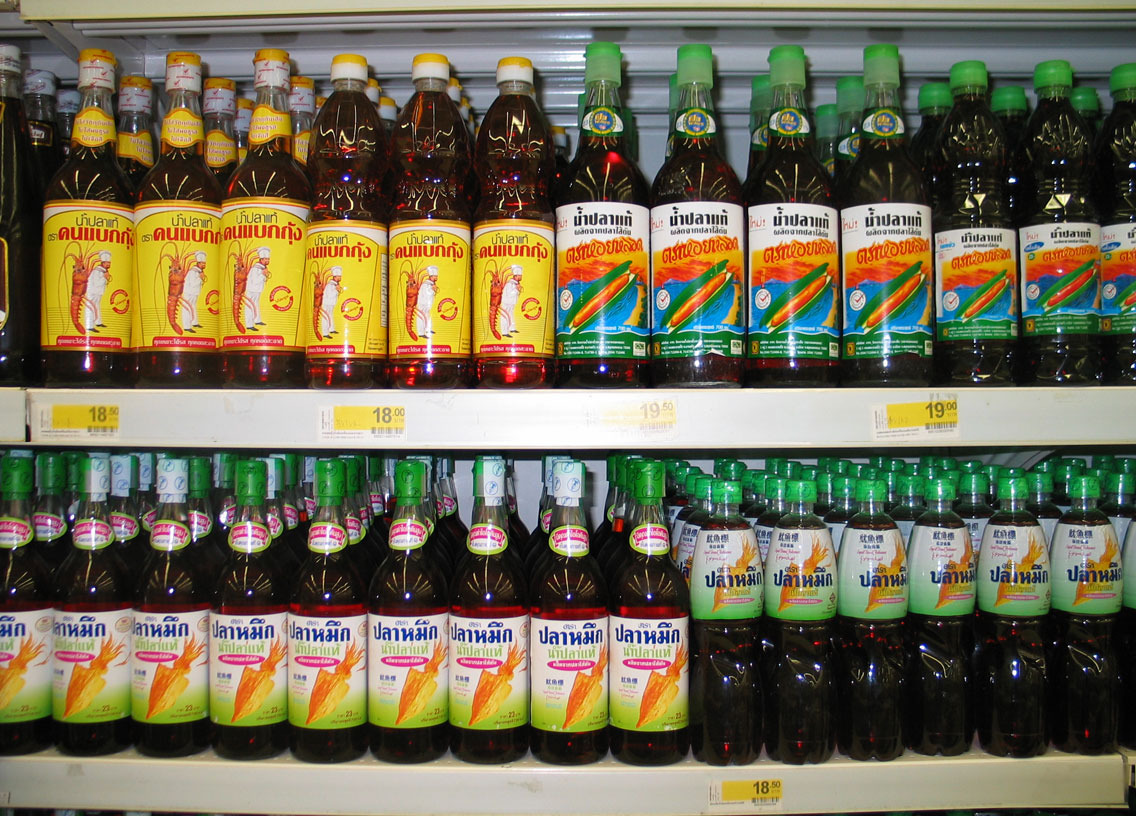
Bottles of fish sauce for sale in Thailand

- Surimi refers to a Japanese food product intended to mimic the meat of lobster, crab, and other shellfish. It is typically made from white-fleshed fish (such as pollock or hake) that has been pulverized to a paste and attains a rubbery texture when cooked.
- Fish glue is made by boiling the skin, bones and swim bladders of fish. Fish glue has long been valued for its use in all manner of products from illuminated manuscripts to the Mongolian war bow.
- Fish oil is recommended for a healthy diet because it contains the omega-3 fatty acids, eicosapentaenoic acid (EPA), and docosahexaenoic acid (DHA), precursors to eicosanoids that reduce inflammation throughout the body.
- Fish emulsion is a fertilizer emulsion that is produced from the fluid remains of fish processed for fish oil and fish meal industrially.
- Fish hydrolysate is ground up fish carcasses. After the usable portions are removed for human consumption, the remaining fish body – guts, bones, cartilage, scales, meat, etc. – are put into water and ground up.
- Fish meal is made from both whole fish and the bones and offal from processed fish. It is a brown powder or cake obtained by rendering pressing the whole fish or fish trimmings to remove the fish oil. It used as a high-protein supplement in aquaculture feed.
- Fish sauce is a condiment that is derived from fish that have been allowed to ferment. It is an essential ingredient in many curries and sauces.
- Isinglass is a substance obtained from the swim bladders of fish (especially sturgeon), it is used for the clarification of wine and beer.
- Tatami iwashi is a Japanese processed food product made from baby sardines laid out and dried while entwined in a single layer to form a large mat-like sheet.

== Other processed products ==
- Pearls, mother-of-pearl, and abalone are valued for their lustre. Traditional methods of pearl hunting are now virtually extinct.
- Sea horse, star fish, sea urchin and sea cucumber are used in traditional Chinese medicine.
- The Sea snails Murex brandaris and Murex trunculus are used to make the pigment Tyrian purple.
- Some sepia pigment is made from the inky secretions of cuttlefish.

== Byproducts ==
- A shimmery substance found on fish scales, most usually obtained from herring and one of many by-products of commercial fish processing, can also be used for pearlescent effects, primarily in nail polish, but is now rarely used due to its high cost, bismuth oxychloride flakes being used as a substitute instead.

== See also ==
- Animal product – Material derived from non-human animal body
- Fish processing – Process from catching to selling fish
- Fish market – Marketplace for fish and fish products
- List of harvested aquatic animals by weight – Aquatic animals that are harvested commercially in the greatest amounts
- Reduction fishery – Fishery that reduces its catch into fishmeal and fish oil

== Sources ==
This article incorporates text from a free content work. Licensed under CC BY-SA 3.0 IGO (license statement/permission). Text taken from In brief, The State of World Fisheries and Aquaculture, 2018, FAO, FAO.
