= Fish emulsion =

Fertilizer emulsion

Fish emulsion is a fertilizer emulsion that is produced from the fluid remains of fish processed for fish oil and fish meal industrially.

== Production ==
The process of creating fish emulsion begins with whole fish, or with carcass products of fish, such as bones, scales, and skin, which are left after a fish has been processed. The fish and carcass products are then ground into a slurry. After the oils and fish meal are removed from the slurry, the slurry is officially a fish emulsion. Most emulsions are then strained to remove any remaining solids, and sulfuric acid is often added to increase the acidity and prevent the growth of microbes.

== Gardening ==
Since fish emulsion is naturally derived, it is considered an organic fertilizer appropriate for use in organic horticulture. In addition to having a typical N-P-K analysis of 5-2-2, fish emulsion adds micronutrients.

Fish emulsion, applied as a liquid fertilizer, is also used when growing roses to enhance the bloom color of the flowers.

== See also ==
- Fish hydrolysate
- Organic fertilizers
