= Fish hydrolysate =

Ground up fish in liquid phase

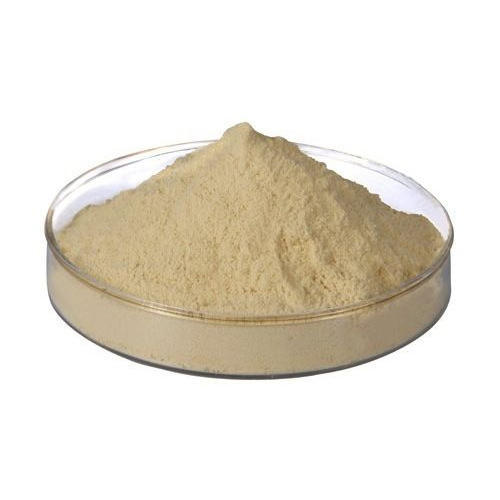
Fish hydrolysates have been made into a dried product

Fish hydrolysate, in its simplest form, is ground up fish transformed into a liquid phase, where the cleavage of molecular bonds occurs through various biological processes. Raw material choice; either whole fish or by-products, depends on the commercial sources of the fish. In some cases, the fillet portions are removed for human consumption, the remaining fish body (generally the guts, bones, cartilage, scales and remaining meat) is put into water and ground up. Some fish hydrolysate is ground more finely than others so more bone material is able to remain suspended. Enzymes may also be used to dissolve bones, scale and meat. If the larger chunks of bone and scales are screened out, calcium or mineral content may be lacking in the finished product form. If purchasing fish hydrolysate for agricultural applications, one should look at the label carefully for the concentration of mineral elements in the liquid. Some fish hydrolysates have been made into a dried product, increasing the potential for inclusion as an ingredient in other food or feed products. The oil is separated out in this process, which means the Omega 3 fatty acid would remain with the oil and not the hydrolysate.

== Uses of fish hydrolysate ==
There are many uses of fish hydrolysate - from fish-based fertilizer, to its use as an animal food, or even for human consumption applications which are developing. A number of scientific journals have cited the antiproliferative activity of fish protein hydrolysate, which makes it eligible for listing as a nutriceutical.

== Bycatch ==
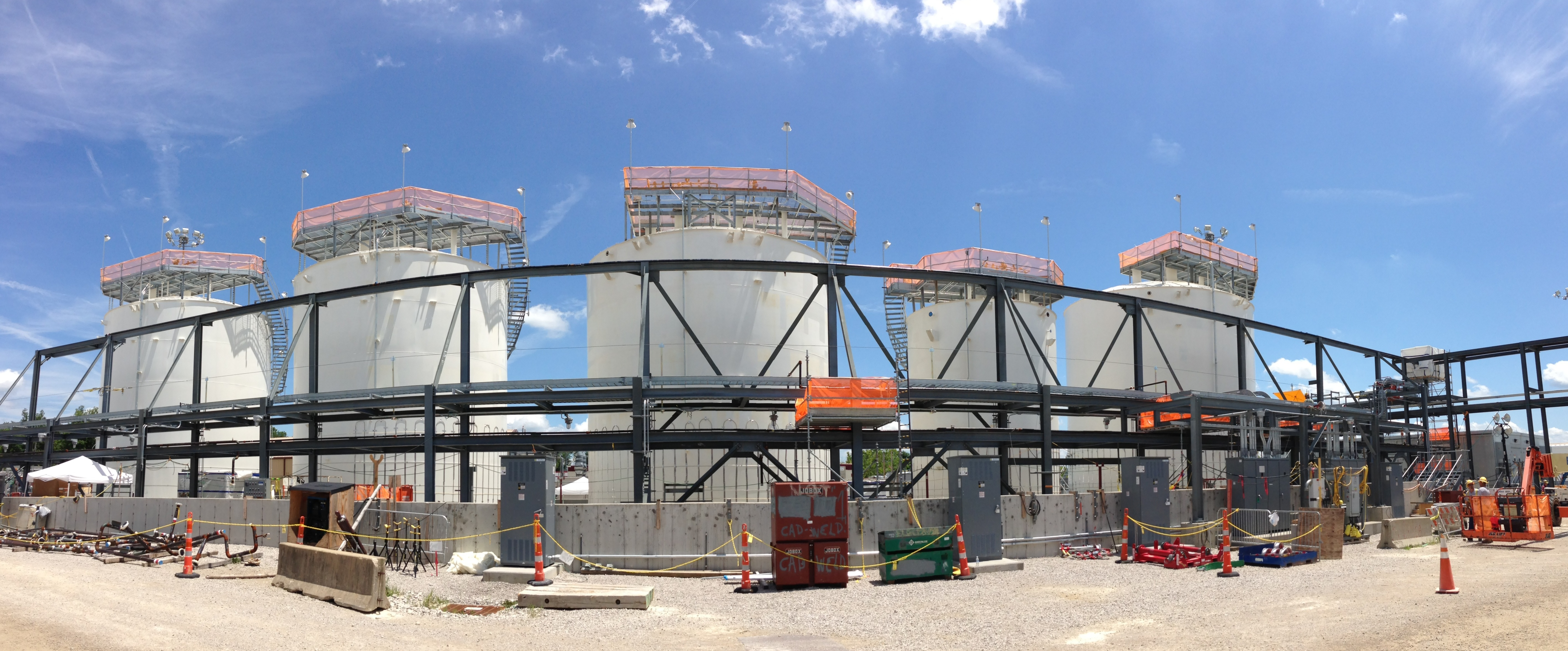
Hydrolysate process minces

New technologies that have increased fishing efficiency have also resulted in the taking of species or sizes not suitable for market, known as bycatch. An increased catch of unsaleable whole fish has resulted from the increased bycatch of the fishing industry. These fish are often dumped overboard at sea, but are also brought into port in the holds of fishing boats. This has spurred an incentive to find a market for the bycatch in order to lower the cost of production.

== Stabilizers ==
The liquid fish hydrolysate process minces the whole fish, then enzymatically digests, then grinds and liquifies the resulting product, known as gurry. Because it is a cold process, gurry putrefies more rapidly than fish emulsion and needs to be stabilized at a lower pH, requiring more acid. Researchers have tried formic acid, sulfuric acid, and others. Formic acid had phytotoxic effects on plants. Phosphoric acid is the preferred stabilizer.

== Comparison with fish emulsion ==
If fish hydrolysate is heated, the oils and certain proteins can be more easily removed to be sold in purified forms. The complex protein, carbohydrate and fats in the fish material are denatured, which means they are broken down into less complex foods. Overheating can result in destruction of the material as a food to grow beneficial organisms. Once the oils are removed and proteins denatured and simplified by the heating process, this material is called a fish emulsion. The hydrolysate process has substantially lower capital and production costs compared to fish emulsion production.
