= Tissue residue =

Tissue residue is the concentration of a chemical or compound in an organism's tissue or in a portion of an organism's tissue. Tissue residue is used in aquatic toxicology to help determine the fate of chemicals in aquatic systems, bioaccumulation of a substance, or bioavailability of a substance, account for multiple routes of exposure (ingestion, absorption, inhalation), and address an organism's exposure to chemical mixtures. A tissue residue approach to toxicity testing is considered a more direct and less variable measure of chemical exposure and is less dependent on external environmental factors than measuring the concentration of a chemical in the exposure media.

In general, tissue residue approaches are used for chemicals that bioaccumulate or for bioaccumulative chemicals. The majority of these substances are organic compounds that are not easily metabolized by organisms and have long environmental persistence. Examples of these chemicals include polychlorinated dibenzodioxins, furans, biphenyls, DDT and its metabolites, and dieldrin.

The use of tissue residues in assessing toxicity and bioaccumulation may also be referred to as the tissue residue-effects approach (TRA), critical body residue (CBR), or tissue residue-based toxicity tests.

== History ==
Historically, aquatic toxicology toxicity tests have focused on water-based approaches where concentration of a toxicant is determined by its concentration in the water. Although tissue residue use and concepts have existed for over 100 years due to interest in narcosis and anesthesia, it was not widely used in toxicology. The first known study of tissue residue in environmental toxicology was reported in 1912 by White and Thomas who investigated the effects of copper exposure to fish using whole-body copper concentrations.

Since the 1980s, there has been rapid growth in the tissue residue approach to toxicology. The water-based approach has been re-evaluated due to challenges in assessing the toxicity of bioaccumulating chemicals. Water-based approaches are not always an accurate estimation of the concentration of a bioaccumulating chemical in an organism, nor does the water-based approach incorporate the multiple routes of exposure of an organism to a toxicant and the additive effects across these routes.

== Advantages ==
The use of tissue residue allows an investigator to: account for multiple routes of exposure, account for toxicokinetic differences between species, account for factors that alter bioavailability and potentially address exposure of an organism to a chemical mixture. Tissue residue also has the ability to represent temporal and spatial exposure or an organism, as well as clarify the cause-effect relationship of chemicals. These relationships are often distorted by uncertainty in chemical bioavailability. The mechanism of action for a chemical depends on the internal tissue concentration, thus tissue residue gives researchers a more direct estimate of the residue-effect (dose-response) relationship. Tissue residue is also less variable than other measures of chemical exposure.

In addition to the aforementioned advantages of tissue residue use, the U.S. EPA also states that this approach explicitly considers exposure through diet, will support identification and investigation of a chemical's mode of action, incorporate the effects of an organism's metabolism on accumulation and allow for experimental verification between lab and field studies.

== Disadvantages ==
The majority of issues with tissue residue arise in the interpretation of tissue residue data. Interpretation complication can be caused by choice of endpoints, species choice, life stage sensitivity, data quality, and toxicity data extrapolation. Choice of tissue for tissue residue analysis can also be difficult and has an effect on tissue residue data. When choosing tissue, a scientist needs to consider: mode and mechanism of action of chemical being tested, site of toxic action for the chemical and species combination being studied and strength of the tissue residue-response relationship. There is also a lack of reliable tissue residue relationships available for comparison.

Although use of tissue residue can account for multiple routes of exposure, it cannot identify the routes of exposure. Tissue residue also cannot account for biotransformation of organic chemicals. If a chemical is biotransformed, the concentration of the parent chemical is lower, but the metabolites may still be toxic. Tissue residue approaches are not as useful for chemicals with short half-lives because an organism will only be sporadically exposed. Overall, tissue residue is meant to complement data from water-based approaches, not replace them.

== Use in regulation ==
=== North America ===
The U.S. Environmental Protection Agency (USEPA) has incorporated tissue residue through the development of the Biotic Ligand Model as well as water quality standards for copper. USEPA has also recently published draft aquatic life criteria for selenium using a tissue-based approach. USEPA is currently working on incorporating tissue residue into standards for bioaccumulating chemicals, which are usually hydrophobic with a log octanol-water partition coefficient greater than 5 (log Kow>5). Canada uses tissue residue formally in guidelines called tissue residue guidelines (TRGs), which are primarily used for protecting wildlife that consume aquatic life.

=== Europe ===
There is a lack of formal use of tissue residue in Europe.

=== Australia and New Zealand ===
Australia and New Zealand both use tissue residue-based approaches for biomonitoring programs for mussels and oysters.

=== Available databases ===
There are two comprehensive aquatic toxicology databasesAquatic Toxicology Databases available for tissue residue in the United States. The first is the Toxicity Residue Database maintained by the USEPA. The second is the Environmental residue-effects database (ERED) maintained by the U.S. Army Corps of Engineers. Currently, the majority of the data available is derived from acute lethal response studies.

== Applications ==
=== Metals ===
Tissue residue of metals in invertebrate prey organisms may reduce uncertainty in estimating exposure from multiple routes. This may be especially important in early life stages of an organism or for species listed under the Endangered Species Act (ESA). However, it is challenging to develop a suitable approach to assessing metal toxicity through tissue residue because water quality can have a large influence on metal toxicity. With the exception of organometallic compounds, no generalized approaches have been created for analyzing metals in tissue residue, although site-specific and species-specific approaches have been successfully developed and used, especially for invertebrates. A recent paper examined tissue-residue toxicity for copper and cadmium in fish and found low variability among species for both metals compared to aqueous-exposure toxicity metrics. These results indicate that whole-body concentrations of metals in fish may be useful for Environmental Quality Guidelines, forensic evaluation, and ecological risk assessment. An additional benefit includes the potential to characterize a contaminated ecosystem based on elevated whole-body metal concentrations resulting from acclimation.

=== PAHs (Polycyclic aromatic hydrocarbons) ===
Fish are able to quickly metabolize and eliminate PAHs, therefore tissue residue of parent PAH compounds will not provide adequate information on exposure to the organism. PAH exposure in fish has been associated with reproductive impairment, immune deficiency, and liver lesions as well as other health problems. In contrast, invertebrates do not metabolize and excrete PAHs as efficiently as fish, therefore an investigator can better understand location and temporal patterns of bioavailable PAHs through tissue residue of these invertebrates.

=== PCBs (Polychlorinated biphenyls) ===
Unlike PAHs, tissue residue of PCBs for fish can provide reliable information on exposure and toxicity. The tissue residue of PCBs in fish can provide vital information in an exposure assessment because fish generally receive PCBs through exposure via the food web. There are currently two screening approaches for PCBs in fish based on PCB body burdens.

=== In-situ ===
Both the United States and United Kingdom have mussel watch monitoring programs. Although these programs differ in many ways, both use tissue residues to establish biological effects, such as survival and body condition, of chemicals present. In contrast to the passive nature of the mussel watch monitoring programs, tissue residue has also been applied in in-situ bioassays in the United States, United Kingdom and Canada.

=== Superfund sites ===
Tissue residue guidelines were developed for tributyltin (TBT) for the Harbor Island Superfund site, Lower Duwamish Superfund site and the Portland Harbor Superfund site. At the Harbor Island Superfund site, tissue trigger levels were developed to provide guidance on remediation action. Tissue residue toxicity reference value (TRV) was developed for TBT regarding mortality and growth at the Lower Duwamish Superfund site. Tissue residue TRVs were also developed for TBT, as well as many other chemicals, for use in the Portland Harbor Superfund site work.

=== Ecological risk assessment ===
Ecological risk assessment aims to source of contamination to exposure to a toxicity endpoint. This requires a risk assessor to identify and estimate exposure pathways. Tissue residue is the only approach that inherently accounts for toxicity due to multiple exposure pathways. There is also a need in risk assessment to understand the bioaccumulation of chemicals4, as well as a direct estimation of bioavailability. Modeling food web exposure is difficult in risk assessment and requires many assumptions but this uncertainty can be reduced through tissue residue. Tissue residue may also allow provide a link between ecological risk assessment and human health risk assessment.

The issues with using tissue residue in risk assessment are similar to the disadvantages listed above.
