= SQT =

SQT or sqt may refer to:

- SEAL Qualification Training, a US Navy SEAL training course
- Sediment quality triad, an assessment tool to evaluate sediment degradation
- Short QT syndrome, a rare genetic heart disease
- Snow Queen Trophy, ski race in Zagreb
- Soqotri language, a South Semitic language, ISO 639-3 language code sqt
- Suit Quality Test, part of hand evaluation in contract bridge
