= Aquatic toxicology databases =

Large databases from aquatic and environmental toxicity studies

Toxicological databases are large compilations of data derived from aquatic and environmental toxicity studies. Data is aggregated from a large number of individual studies in which toxic effects upon aquatic and terrestrial organisms have been determined for different chemicals. These databases are then used by toxicologists, chemists, regulatory agencies and scientists to investigate and predict the likelihood that an organic or inorganic chemical will cause an adverse effect (i.e. toxicity) on exposed organisms.

Several such databases have been compiled relating specifically to aquatic toxicology.

== Utility ==
These databases are invaluable resources in the field of aquatic toxicology because the likelihood that a chemical will cause toxicity is highly variable across the broad spectrum of contaminants in the environment. This is because the likelihood of adverse effects on an organism is dependent on the concentration of that substance in the target tissues of the organism, the physicochemical properties of that chemical and the duration of exposure to the chemical. Tools capable of predicting the toxicity of specific chemicals to particular organisms or groups of organisms are essential to regulators and researchers in the field of toxicology.

== Available databases ==
In aquatic toxicology multiple databases exist and each generally pertains to a single aspect of aquatic toxicology such as PCBs, tissue residues or sediment toxicity. Other informational and regulatory databases on toxicology in general are maintained by the U.S. EPA, USGS, United States Army Corps of Engineers and the National Oceanic and Atmospheric Administration. In the U.S. there are three major databases pertaining specifically to aquatic toxicology: the Toxicity/Residue Database, the Environmental Residue Effects Database and the ECOTOX database.

=== Toxicity/Residue Database ===
The Toxicity/Residue Database is maintained by the U.S. EPA and is a database for the prediction of toxicity of organic and inorganic chemicals to aquatic organisms. This data base was developed by the EPA Duluth office and became operational in 1999. The data base is derived from more than 500 peer-reviewed references and is a collection of their findings on roughly 200 chemicals and 190 species both marine and fresh water. Data regarding organism response endpoints or effects are measured as the concentration of chemical in the tissue of the test organism at the time which effects such as lethality, metabolic depression, or increased respiration occur. More than 3,000 effects may be queried from a small piece of downloaded software to gather survival, growth or reproductive endpoint effect data.

=== Environmental Residue Effects Database ===
The Environmental Residue Effects Database (ERED) is a database maintained by the U.S. Army Corps of Engineers that pairs data regarding the bioaccumulation of toxicants in tissue (via tissue residue) to endpoint effects such as mortality, growth, or physiological and biochemical responses. Response data also include low effect detected (LOED) and no effect detected (NOED) concentrations. This database is derived from 2329 peer-reviewed references regarding 413 chemicals. The database covers literature from 1964 to the present and includes more than 15,000 records. This database is updated with 300 or more records every year on average. The ERED database is specific to sediment toxicity and the effects of contaminates in dredged materials on freshwater organisms. It is intended to be used in evaluating the potential for contaminate concentrations of dredged sediment to have unacceptable adverse effects on aquatic organisms. Although the ERED database was designed as a tool for the Army Corps of Engineers to manage adverse effects of dredging, it is widely applicable to sediment toxicity studies and management.

=== The ECOTOX database ===
ECOTOX is considered to be more comprehensive in that it holds results from toxicity tests of single chemicals on aquatic and terrestrial plants and animals. Data can be found on both freshwater and marine taxa. ECOTOX collects data from previously EPA established databases AQUIRE, TERRATOX, and PHYTOTOX which individually provide aquatic, terrestrial species and plant data respectively. Data large is collected from peer-reviewed literature however some amount of data is sourced from grey literature. Using the Quick Database Query function enables searches by chemical, taxonomic name, effect, and publication year. Data from ECOTOX is used to provide reference parameters to current toxicity studies and serves as a regulatory guideline.

==== ECOTOX source data screening ====
Data resulting from toxicity studies that is integrated in to the ECOTOX database is subjected to a screening and quality assurance criteria developed by the EPA and the Office of Pesticide Programs (OPP). In order for study results to be accepted by the EPA and OPP the toxicity study must follow or consist of the following:

- The toxic effects are related to single chemical exposure;
- The toxic effects are on an aquatic or terrestrial plant or animal species;
- There is a biological effect on live, whole organisms;
- A concurrent environmental chemical concentration/dose or application rate is reported; and
- There is an explicit duration of exposure.

In addition to the criteria listed above, the following criteria, which are discussed in further detail in Attachment I, are applied by OPP as a further screen of acceptability:

- Toxicology information is reported for a chemical of concern to OPP;
- The article is published in the English language;
- The study is presented as a full article;
- The paper is a publicly available document;
- The paper is the primary source of the data
- A calculated endpoint is reported;
- Treatment(s) are compared to an acceptable control;
- The location of the study (e.g., laboratory vs. field) is reported; and
- The tested species is reported and verified.

== Regulatory applications ==
In the United States, the ECOTOX, ERED (sediment) and Toxicity Residue Databases are used by many regulatory agencies such as state environmental quality agencies and the EPA to determine regulatory environmental toxicant concentration levels. Under the Clean Water Act the EPA has used the ECOTOX database among other information to set wastewater toxicant concentration standards for industry as well as water quality standards for all contaminants in surface waters. Under the CWA, individual states must regulate water quality criteria at or below the concentrations set forth by the EPA. Sediment toxicant concentrations, however, are generally not regulated in the same way. The determination of sediment quality criteria and sediment toxicity testing is highly complex and is often regulated by states or some state run environmental agency. Sediment toxicity evaluations of contaminated sediments are very site specific and toxicant effect levels are often much more variable than those of surface waters. For this reason it may be nearly impossible to develop feasible acceptable sediment concentration regulations that apply to all aquatic systems or regions.

Acceptable concentrations or sediment quality guidelines have been developed and are used in risk assessments and the management of dredged materials. "Sediment quality guidelines" (SQGs), as defined at the 2002 Society of Environmental Toxicology and Chemistry (SETAC) Pellston Workshop, are numerical chemical concentrations intended to be either protective of biological resources, or predictive of adverse effects to those resources, or both. SQGs for assessing sediment quality relative to the potential for adverse effects on sediment-dwelling organisms have been derived using both mechanistic and empirical approaches.
