= Oil pollution toxicity to marine fish =

Oil pollution toxicity to marine fish has been observed from oil spills such as the Exxon Valdez disaster, and from nonpoint sources, such as surface runoff, which is the largest source of oil pollution in marine waters.

Crude oil entering waterways from spills or runoff contain polycyclic aromatic hydrocarbons (PAHs), the most toxic components of oil. The route of PAH uptake into fish depends on many environmental factors and the properties of the PAH. The common routes are ingestion, ventilation of the gills, and dermal uptake. Fish exposed to these PAHs exhibit an array of toxic effects including genetic damage, morphological deformities, altered growth and development, decreased body size, inhibited swimming abilities and mortality. The morphological deformities of PAH exposure, such as fin and jaw malformations, result in significantly reduced survival in fish due to the reduction of swimming and feeding abilities. While the exact mechanism of PAH toxicity is unknown, there are four proposed mechanisms. The difficulty in finding a specific toxic mechanism is largely due to the wide variety of PAH compounds with differing properties.

== History ==
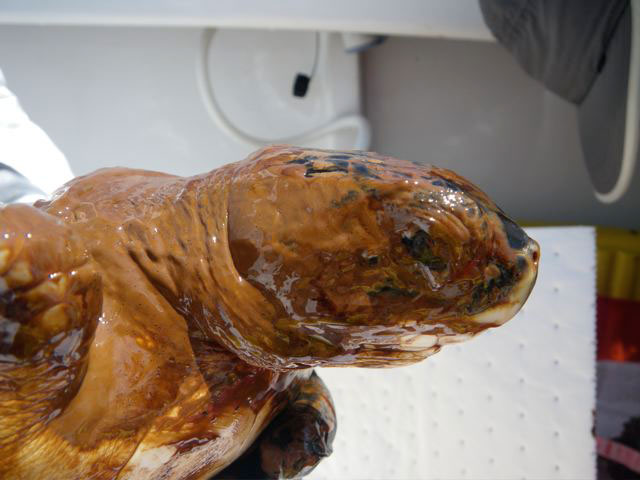
Kemp's Ridley Turtle polluted in heavy oil, June 1, 2010

Research on the environmental impact of the petroleum industry began in earnest, during the mid to late 20th century, as the oil industry developed and expanded. Large scale transport of crude oil increased as a result of the increasing worldwide demand for oil, subsequently increasing the number of oil spills. Oil spills provided perfect opportunities for scientists to examine the in situ effects of crude oil exposure to marine ecosystems, and collaborative efforts between the National Oceanic and Atmospheric Administration (NOAA) and the United States Coast Guard resulted in improved response efforts and detailed research on oil pollution's effects. The Exxon Valdez oil spill in 1989, and the Deepwater Horizon oil spill in 2010, both resulted in increased scientific knowledge on the specific effects of oil pollution toxicity to marine fish.

=== Exxon Valdez oil spill ===
Focused research on oil pollution toxicity to fish began in earnest in 1989, after the Exxon Valdez tanker struck a reef in Prince William Sound, Alaska and spilled approximately 11 million gallons of crude oil into the surrounding water. At the time, the Exxon Valdez oil spill was the largest in the history of the United States. There were many adverse ecological impacts of the spill including the loss of the loss of billions of Pacific herring and pink salmon eggs. Pacific herring were just beginning to spawn in late March when the spill occurred, resulting in nearly half of the population's eggs being exposed to crude oil. Pacific herring spawn in the intertidal and subtidal zones, making the vulnerable eggs easily exposed to pollution.

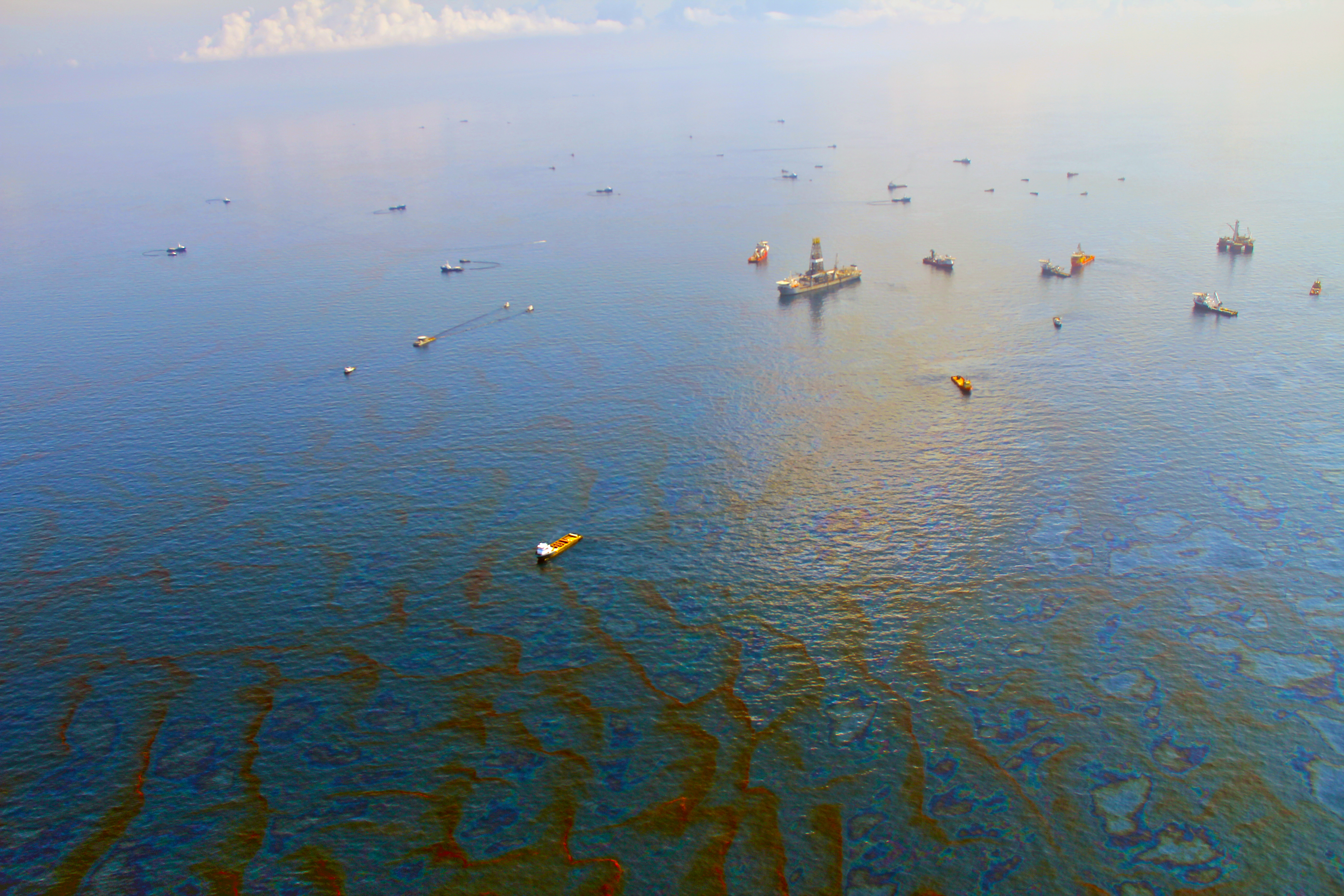
Aftermath of the Deepwater Horizon oil spill in the Gulf of Mexico.

=== Deepwater Horizon oil spill ===
After April 20, 2010, when an explosion on the Deepwater Horizon Macondo oil drilling platform triggered the largest oil spill in US history, another opportunity for oil toxicity research was presented. Approximately 171 million gallons of crude oil flowed from the seafloor into the Gulf of Mexico, exposing the majority of the surrounding biota. The Deepwater Horizon oil spill also coincided directly with spawning window of various ecologically and commercially important fish species, including yellowfin and Atlantic bluefin tuna. The oil spill directly affected Atlantic bluefin tuna, as approximately 12% of larval tuna were located in oil-contaminated waters, and Gulf of Mexico is the only known spawning grounds for the western population of bluefin tuna.

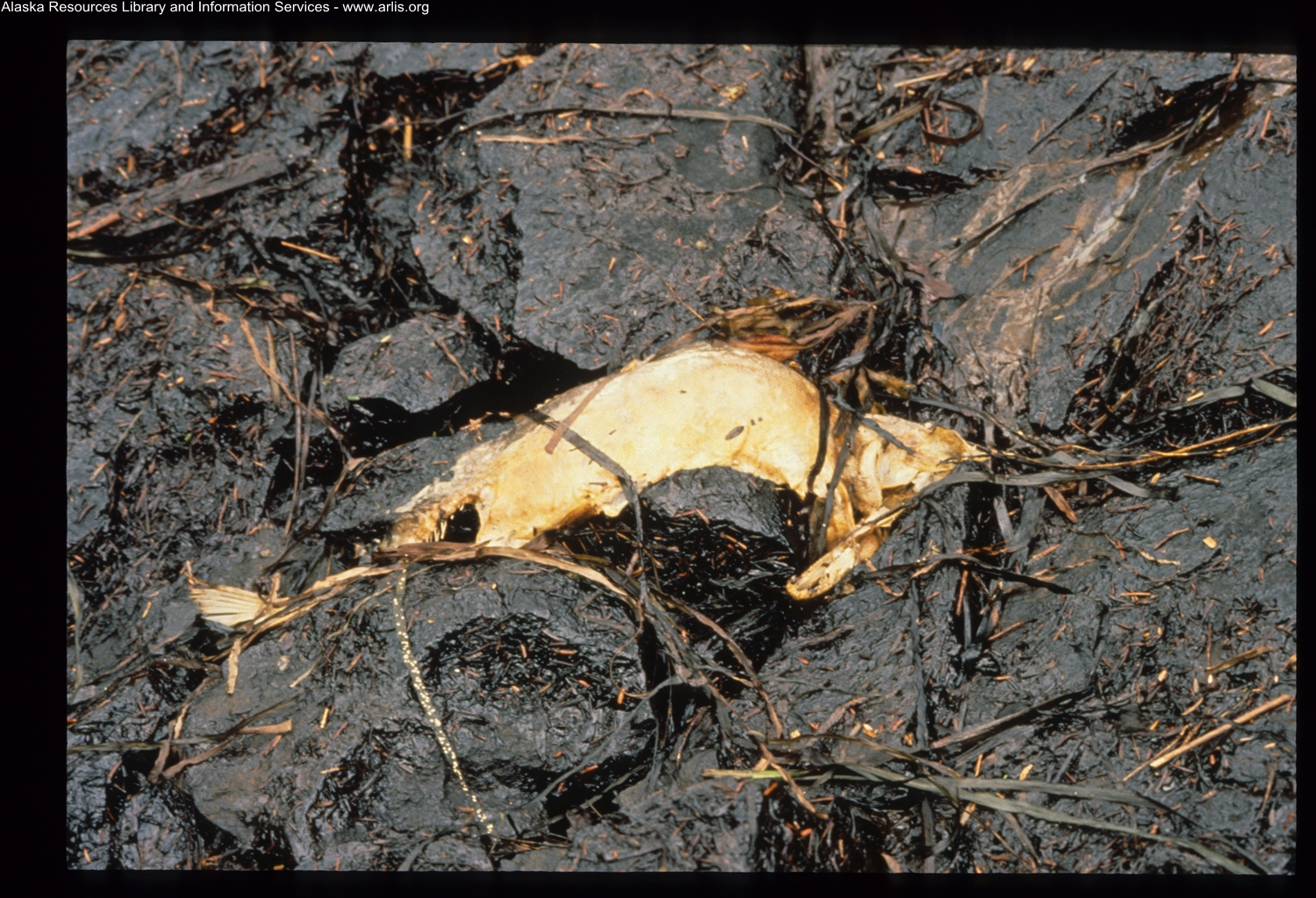
A decaying fish trapped in oil inside the Bay of Isles, Alaska after the Exxon Valdez oil spill.

== Exposure to oil ==
Oil spills, as well as daily oil runoff from urbanized areas, can lead to polycyclic aromatic hydrocarbon (PAHs) entering marine ecosystems. Once PAHs enter the marine environment, fish can be exposed to them via ingestion, ventilation of the gills, and dermal uptake. The major route of uptake will depend on the behavior of the species of fish and the physicochemical properties of the PAH of concern. Habitat can be a major deciding factor for the route of exposure. For example, demersal fish or fish that consume demersal fish are highly likely to ingest PAHs that have sorbed to the sediment, whereas fish that swim at the surface are at a higher risk for dermal exposure. Upon coming in contact with a PAH, bioavailability will affect how readily the PAH is taken up. The EPA identifies 16 major PAHs of concern and each of these PAHs has a different degree of bioavailability. For instance, PAHs with lower molecular weight are more bioavailable because they dissolve more readily in water and are therefore more bioavailable for fish within the water column. Similarly, hydrophilic PAHs are more bioavailable for uptake by fish. For this reason, usage of oil dispersants, like Corexit, to treat oil spills can increase the uptake of PAHs by increasing their solubility in water and making them more available for uptake via the gills. Once a PAH is taken up, the fish's metabolism can affect the duration and intensity of the exposure to target tissues. Fish are able to readily metabolize 99% of PAHs to a more hydrophilic metabolite through their hepato-biliary system. This allows for the excretion of PAHs. The rate of metabolism of PAHs will depend on the sex and size of the species. The ability to metabolize PAHs into a more hydrophilic form can prevent bioaccumulation and halt PAHs from being passed on to organisms further up the food web. Because oil can persist in the environment long after oil spills via sedimentation, demersal fish are likely to be continually exposed to PAHs many years after oil spills. This has been proven by looking at the biliary PAH metabolites of bottom-dwelling fish. For instance, bottom-dwelling fish still showed elevated levels of low molecular weight PAH metabolites 10 years after Exxon Valdez oil spill.

=== Crude oil components ===
Crude oil is composed of more than 17,000 compounds. Among these 17,000 compounds are PAHs, which are considered the most toxic components of oil. PAHs are formed by pyrogenic and petrogenic processes. Petrogenic PAHs are formed by the elevated pressure of organic material. In contrast, pyrogenic PAHs are formed through the incomplete combustion of organic material. Crude oil naturally contains petrogenic PAHs and these PAH levels are increased significantly through the burning of oil which creates pyrogenic PAHs. The level of PAHs found in crude oil differs with the type of crude oil. For example, crude oil from the Exxon Valdez oil spill had PAH concentrations of 1.47%, while PAH concentrations from the North Sea have much lower PAH concentrations of 0.83%.

=== Sources of crude oil pollution ===
Crude oil contamination in marine ecosystems can lead to both pyrogenic and petrogenic PAHs entering these ecosystems. Petrogenic PAHs can enter waterways through oil seeps, major oil spills, creosote and fuel oil runoff from urban areas. Pyrogenic PAH sources consist of diesel soot tire rubber and coal dust. Although there are natural sources of PAHs such as volcanic activity and seepage of coal deposits, anthropogenic sources pose the most significant input of PAHs into the environment. These anthropogenic sources include residential heating, asphalt production, coal gasification, and petroleum usage. Petrogenic PAH contamination is more common from crude oil spills such as Exxon Valdez, or oil seeps; however, with runoff pyrogenic PAHs can also be prevalent. Although major oil spills such as Exxon Valdez can introduce a large amount of crude oil to a localized area in a short time span, daily runoff comprises most of the oil pollution to marine ecosystems. Atmospheric deposition can also be a source of PAHs into marine ecosystems. The deposition of PAHs from the atmosphere into a water body is largely influenced by the gas-particle partitioning of the PAH.

== Effects ==
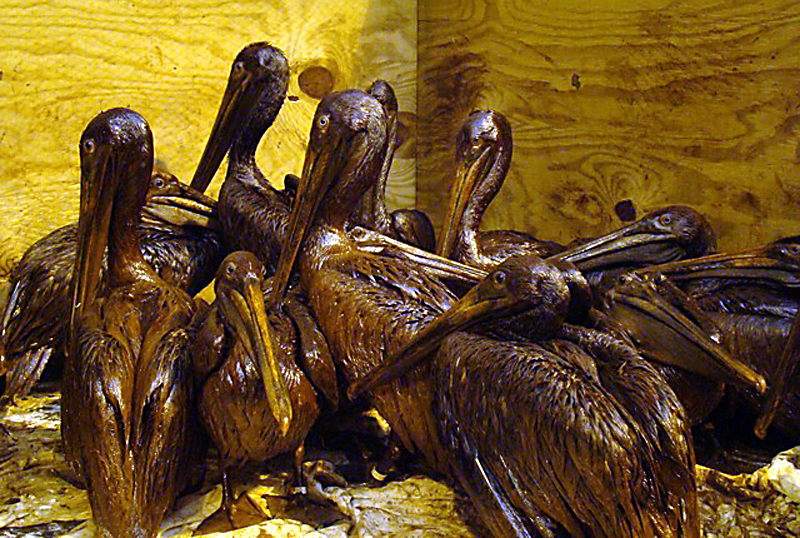
Heavily oiled Brown Pelicans captured at Grand Isle, Louisiana

Many effects of PAH exposure have been observed in marine fish. Specifically, studies have been conducted on the embryonic and larval fish, the development of fish exposed to PAHs, and uptake of PAHs by fish via various routes of exposure. One study on found that Pacific herring eggs exposed to conditions mimicking the ‘’Exxon Valdez’’ oil spill resulted in premature hatching of eggs, reduced size as fish matured and significant teratogenic effects, including skeletal, cardiovascular, fin and yolk sac malformations. Yolk sac edema was responsible for the majority of herring larval mortality. The teratogenic malformations in the dorsal fin and spine, and in the jaw were observed to effectively decrease the survival of developing fish, through the impairing of swimming and feeding ability respectively. Feeding and prey avoidance via swimming are crucial for the survival of larval and juvenile fish. All effects observed in herring eggs in the study were consistent with effects observed in exposed fish eggs following the Exxon Valdez oil spill. Zebrafish embryos exposed to oil were observed to have severe teratogenic defects similar to those seen in herring embryos, including edema, cardiac dysfunction, and intracranial hemorrhages. In a study focused on the uptake of PAHs by fish, salmon embryos were exposed to crude oil in three various situations, including via effluent from oil-coated gravel. PAH concentrations in embryos directly exposed to oil and those exposed to PAH effluent were not significantly different. PAH exposure was observed to lead to death, even when the PAHs were exposed to fish via effluent. From the results, it was determined that fish embryos near the Exxon Valdez spill in Prince William Sound that were not directly in contact with oil still may have accumulated lethal levels of PAHs. While many laboratory and natural studies have observed significant adverse effects of PAH exposure to fish, a lack of effects has also been observed for certain PAH compounds, which could be due to a lack of uptake during exposure to the compound.

=== Proposed mechanism of toxic action ===
While it has been proven that different classes of PAHs act through distinct toxic mechanisms due to the variations in their molecular weight, ring arrangements, and water solubility properties, the specific mechanisms of PAH toxicity to fish and fish development are still unknown. Toxicity depends on the extent to which chemical in the oil will mix with water: this is referred to as the water associated fraction of the oil. The proposed mechanisms of toxicity of PAHs are toxicity through narcosis, interaction with the AhR pathway, alkyl phenanthrene toxicity, and additive toxicity by multiple mechanisms.

- The narcosis model was not able to accurately predict the outcome of PAH mixture exposure of herring and pink salmon, according to a study.
- The primary toxicity of these PAHs in fish embryos has been observed to be AhR independent, and their cardiac effects are not associated with AhR activation or Cytochrome P450, family 1, member A induction in the endocardium.
- The alkyl phenanthrene model has been studied by exposing herring and pink salmon to mixtures of PAHs in an attempt to better understand the toxicity mechanisms of PAHs. The model was found to generally predict the outcomes of sublethal and lethal exposures. Oxidative stress and effects on cardiovascular morphogenesis are proposed mechanisms for alkyl phenanthrene toxicity. The specific pathway is unknown.
- Since PAHs contain many different variations of PAHs, the toxicity may be explained by using multiple mechanisms of action.

== See also ==
- Aquatic toxicology
- Marine pollution
  - Marine debris
