= Marine pollution =

Harmful effects to oceans caused by discarded substances or emitted energy

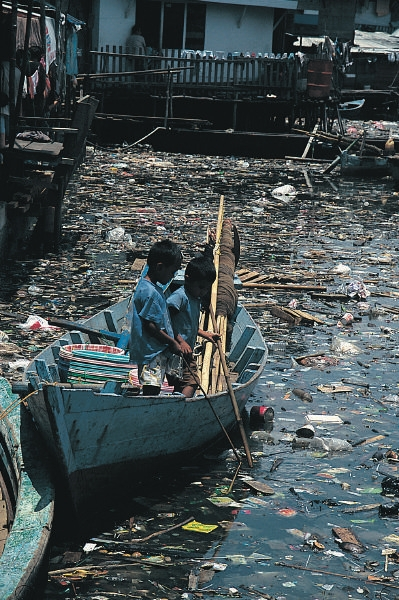
While marine pollution can be obvious, as with the marine debris shown above, it is often the pollutants that cannot be seen that cause most harm.

Marine pollution occurs when substances used or spread by humans, such as industrial, agricultural, and residential waste; particles; noise or light; excess carbon dioxide; or invasive organisms enter the ocean and cause harmful effects there. The majority of this waste (80%) comes from land-based activity, although marine transportation significantly contributes as well. It is a combination of chemicals and trash, most of which comes from land sources and is washed or blown into the ocean. This pollution results in damage to the environment, to the health of all organisms, and to economic structures worldwide. Since most inputs come from land, via rivers, sewage, or the atmosphere, it means that continental shelves are more vulnerable to pollution. Air pollution is also a contributing factor, as it carries iron, carbonic acid, nitrogen, silicon, sulfur, pesticides, and dust particles into the ocean. The pollution often comes from nonpoint sources such as agricultural runoff, wind-blown debris, and dust. These nonpoint sources are largely due to runoff that enters the ocean through rivers, but wind-blown debris and dust can also play a role, as these pollutants can settle into waterways and oceans. Pathways of pollution include direct discharge, land runoff, ship pollution, bilge pollution, dredging (which can create dredge plumes), atmospheric pollution and, potentially, deep sea mining.

Different types of marine pollution can be grouped as pollution from marine debris, plastic pollution, including microplastics, ocean acidification, nutrient pollution, toxins, and underwater noise. Plastic pollution in the ocean is a type of marine pollution by plastics, ranging in size from large original materials such as bottles and bags, down to microplastics formed from the fragmentation of plastic materials. Marine debris is mainly discarded human rubbish that floats on or is suspended in the ocean. Plastic pollution is harmful to marine life.

Another concern is the runoff of nutrients (nitrogen and phosphorus) from intensive agriculture, and the disposal of untreated or partially treated sewage to rivers and subsequently oceans. These nitrogen and phosphorus nutrients (which are also contained in fertilizers) stimulate phytoplankton and macroalgal growth, which can lead to harmful algal blooms (eutrophication) that can be harmful to humans as well as marine creatures. Excessive algal growth can also smother sensitive coral reefs and lead to loss of biodiversity and coral health. A second major concern is that the degradation of algal blooms can lead to consumption of oxygen in coastal waters, a situation that may worsen with climate change as warming reduces vertical mixing of the water column.

Many potentially toxic chemicals adhere to tiny particles which are then taken up by plankton and benthic animals, most of which are either deposit feeders or filter feeders. In this way, the toxins are concentrated upward within ocean food chains. When pesticides are incorporated into the marine ecosystem, they quickly become absorbed into marine food webs. Once in the food webs, these pesticides can cause mutations, as well as diseases, which can be harmful to humans as well as the entire food web. Toxic metals can also be introduced into marine food webs. These can cause changes to tissue matter, biochemistry, behavior, reproduction, and suppress growth in marine life. Also, many animal feeds have a high fish meal or fish hydrolysate content. In this way, marine toxins can be transferred to land animals and appear later in meat and dairy products.

== Pathways of pollution ==
There are many ways to categorize and examine the inputs of pollution into marine ecosystems. There are three main types of inputs of pollution into the ocean: direct discharge of waste into the oceans, runoff into the waters due to rain, and pollutants released from the atmosphere.

One common path of entry by contaminants to the sea are rivers. The evaporation of water from oceans exceeds precipitation. The balance is restored by rain over the continents entering rivers and then being returned to the sea. The Hudson River in New York State and the Raritan River in New Jersey, which empty at the northern and southern ends of Staten Island, are a source of mercury contamination of zooplankton (copepods) in the open ocean. The highest concentration in the filter-feeding copepods is not at the mouths of these rivers but 70 miles (110 km) south, nearer Atlantic City, because water flows close to the coast. It takes a few days before toxins are taken up by the plankton. Ohio River and Tennessee River both join Mississippi River ultimately drains organic contaminants from several northern states into the Gulf of Mexico.

Pollution is often classed as point source or nonpoint source pollution. Point source pollution occurs when there is a single, identifiable, localized source of the pollution. An example is directly discharging sewage and industrial waste into the ocean. Pollution such as this occurs particularly in developing nations. Nonpoint source pollution occurs when the pollution is from ill-defined and diffuse sources. These can be difficult to regulate. Agricultural runoff and wind blown debris are prime examples.

=== Direct discharge ===
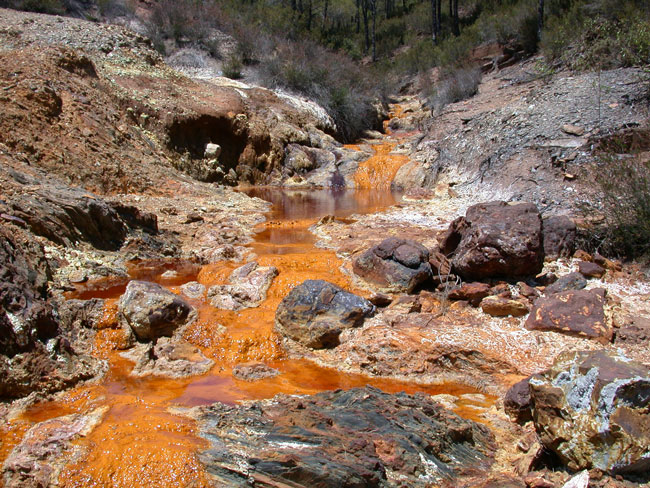
Acid mine drainage in the Rio Tinto River

Pollutants enter rivers and the sea directly from urban sewerage and industrial waste discharges, sometimes in the form of hazardous and toxic wastes, or in the form of plastics.

In a study published by Science, Jambeck et al. (2015) estimated that the 10 largest emitters of oceanic plastic pollution worldwide are, from the most to the least, China, Indonesia, Philippines, Vietnam, Sri Lanka, Thailand, Egypt, Malaysia, Nigeria, and Bangladesh.

Inland mining for copper, gold, etc., is another source of marine pollution. Most of the pollution is simply soil, which ends up in rivers flowing to the sea. However, some minerals discharged in the course of the mining can cause problems, such as copper, a common industrial pollutant, which can interfere with the life history and development of coral polyps. Mining has a poor environmental track record. For example, according to the United States Environmental Protection Agency, mining has contaminated portions of the headwaters of over 40% of watersheds in the western continental US. Much of this pollution ends up in the sea.

=== Land runoff ===
Surface runoff from farming, as well as urban runoff and runoff from the construction of roads, buildings, ports, channels, and harbours, can carry soil and particles laden with carbon, nitrogen, phosphorus, and minerals. This nutrient-rich water can cause fleshy algae and phytoplankton to thrive in coastal areas; known as algal blooms, which have the potential to create hypoxic conditions by using all available oxygen. In the coast of southwest Florida, harmful algal blooms have existed for over 100 years. These algal blooms have been a cause of species of fish, turtles, dolphins, and shrimp to die and cause harmful effects on humans who swim in the water.

Polluted runoff from roads and highways can be a significant source of water pollution in coastal areas. About 75% of the toxic chemicals that flow into Puget Sound are carried by stormwater that runs off paved roads and driveways, rooftops, yards and other developed land. In California, there are many rainstorms that runoff into the ocean. These rainstorms occur from October to March, and these runoff waters contain petroleum, heavy metals, pollutants from emissions, etc.

In China, there is a large coastal population that pollutes the ocean through land runoff. This includes sewage discharge and pollution from urbanization and land use. In 2001, more than 66,795 mi^{2} of the Chinese coastal ocean waters were rated less than Class I of the Sea Water Quality Standard of China. Much of this pollution came from Ag, Cu, Cd, Pb, As, DDT, PCBs, etc., which occurred from contamination through land runoff.

=== Ship pollution ===
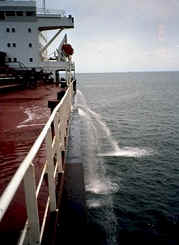
A cargo ship pumps ballast water into the tank.

Ships can pollute waterways and oceans in many ways including through their ballast, bilge, and fuel tanks. Oil spills can have devastating effects. In addition to being toxic to marine life, polycyclic aromatic hydrocarbons (PAHs), found in crude oil, are very difficult to clean up, and last for years in the sediment and marine environment. Additionally, bilge pollution can be toxic to the surrounding environment when bilge water is released from a ship's bilge.

Oil spills are one of the most emotive of marine pollution events. However, while a tanker wreck may result in extensive newspaper headlines, much of the oil in the world's seas comes from other smaller sources, such as tankers discharging ballast water from oil tanks used on return ships, leaking pipelines or engine oil disposed of down sewers.

Discharge of cargo residues from bulk carriers can pollute ports, waterways, and oceans. In many instances vessels intentionally discharge illegal wastes despite foreign and domestic regulation prohibiting such actions. An absence of national standards provides an incentive for some cruise liners to dump waste in places where the penalties are inadequate. It has been estimated that container ships lose over 10,000 containers at sea each year (usually during storms). Ships also create noise pollution that disturbs natural wildlife, and water from ballast tanks can spread harmful algae and other invasive species.

Ballast water taken up at sea and released in port is a major source of unwanted exotic marine life. The invasive freshwater zebra mussels, native to the Black, Caspian, and Azov seas, were probably transported to the Great Lakes via ballast water from a transoceanic vessel. Meinesz believes that one of the worst cases of a single invasive species causing harm to an ecosystem can be attributed to a seemingly harmless jellyfish. Mnemiopsis leidyi, a species of comb jellyfish that spread so it now inhabits estuaries in many parts of the world, was first introduced in 1982, and thought to have been transported to the Black Sea in a ship's ballast water. The population of the jellyfish grew exponentially and, by 1988, it was wreaking havoc upon the local fishing industry. "The anchovy catch fell from 204,000 tons in 1984 to 200 tons in 1993; sprat from 24,600 tons in 1984 to 12,000 tons in 1993; horse mackerel from 4,000 tons in 1984 to zero in 1993." Now that the jellyfish have exhausted the zooplankton, including fish larvae, their numbers have fallen dramatically, yet they continue to maintain a stranglehold on the ecosystem.

Invasive species can take over once occupied areas, facilitate the spread of new diseases, introduce new genetic material, alter underwater seascapes, and jeopardize the ability of native species to obtain food. Invasive species are responsible for about $138 billion annually in lost revenue and management costs in the US alone.

=== Atmospheric pollution ===
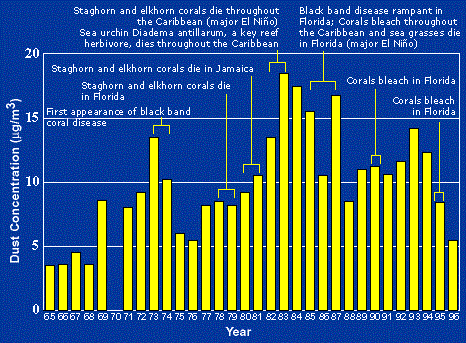
A graph linking atmospheric dust to various coral deaths across the Caribbean Sea and Florida.

Another pathway of pollution occurs through the atmosphere. The ocean has long been affected by the passage of chemicals from the atmosphere (e.g. nutrient source; pH influence). Wind-blown dust and debris, including plastic bags, are blown seaward from landfills and other areas. Dust from the Sahara moving around the southern periphery of the subtropical ridge moves into the Caribbean and Florida during the warm season as the ridge builds and moves northward through the subtropical Atlantic. Dust can also be attributed to a global transport from the Gobi and Taklamakan deserts across Korea, Japan, and the Northern Pacific to the Hawaiian Islands.

Since 1970, dust outbreaks have worsened due to periods of drought in Africa. There is a large variability in dust transport to the Caribbean and Florida from year to year; however, the flux is greater during positive phases of the North Atlantic Oscillation. The USGS links dust events to a decline in the health of coral reefs across the Caribbean and Florida, primarily since the 1970s.

Climate change is raising ocean temperatures and raising levels of carbon dioxide in the atmosphere. These rising levels of carbon dioxide are acidifying the oceans. This, in turn, is altering aquatic ecosystems and modifying fish distributions, with impacts on the sustainability of fisheries and the livelihoods of the communities that depend on them. Healthy ocean ecosystems are also important for the mitigation of climate change.

=== Deep sea mining ===
Deep sea mining has significant environmental impacts. Research on deep-sea polymetallic nodule mining has substantially increased in recent years, but the expected level of environmental impact is still being established. Scientists from MIT examined seafloor sediment plumes generated by a prototype mining collector in the Clarion Clipperton Zone and found that the plume forms a low-lying turbidity current which hugs the seafloor. Another MIT-led study found that modelling can reliably predict plume behaviour in the midwater column, and impact is influenced by the quantity of discharged sediment, and the turbulence of the water upon discharge.

Some of the potential toxic metals include copper, zinc, cadmium, lead as well as rare earth elements such as lanthanum and yttrium. Following the release of toxins there is an increase of noise, light, sediment le dan plumes and elements that have the potential to impact the ecosystems.

Deep sea minerals (DSM) can be extremely beneficial, it can cause wealth, raising living standards as well as economic opportunities for both current and future generations. In addition, if the wealth is poorly managed it can have the potential to cause great economic and social damage. The instability of price and production levels of minerals can cause an external economic shock leading to a significant backlash on the domestic economy.

== Types of pollution ==
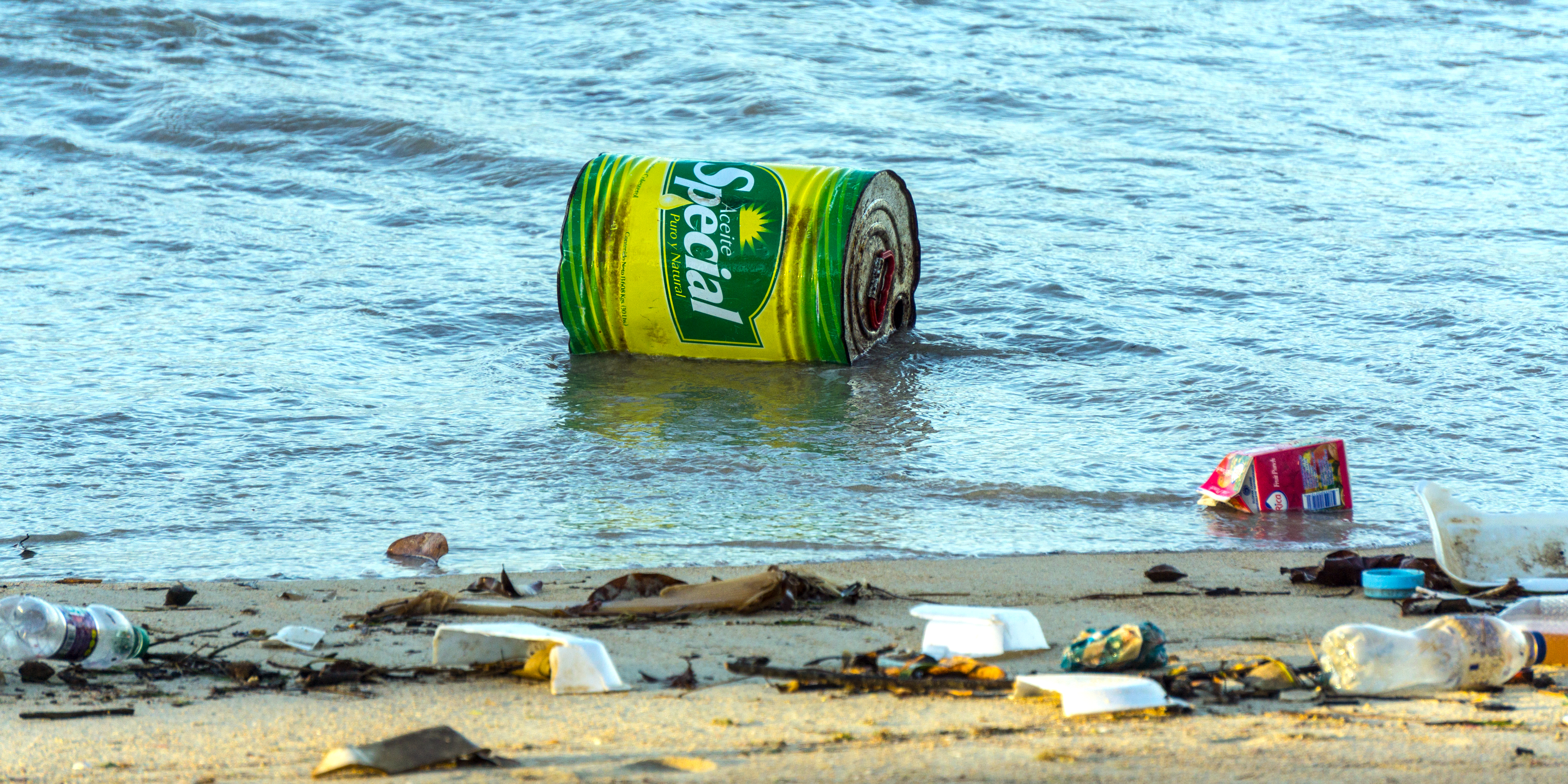
Can floating in the ocean

=== Marine debris pollution ===
Marine debris, also known as marine litter, is human-created solid material that has deliberately or accidentally been released in seas or the ocean. Floating oceanic debris tends to accumulate at the center of gyres and on coastlines, frequently washing aground, when it is known as beach litter or tidewrack. Deliberate disposal of wastes at sea is called ocean dumping. Naturally occurring debris, such as driftwood and drift seeds, are also present. With the increasing use of plastic, human influence has become an issue as many types of (petrochemical) plastics do not biodegrade quickly, as would natural or organic materials. The largest single type of plastic pollution (~10%) and majority of large plastic in the oceans is discarded and lost nets from the fishing industry. Waterborne plastic poses a serious threat to fish, seabirds, marine reptiles, and marine mammals, as well as to boats and coasts.

Dumping, container spillages, litter washed into storm drains and waterways and wind-blown landfill waste all contribute to this problem. This increased water pollution has caused serious negative effects such as discarded fishing nets capturing animals, concentration of plastic debris in massive marine garbage patches, and increasing concentrations of contaminants in the food chain.

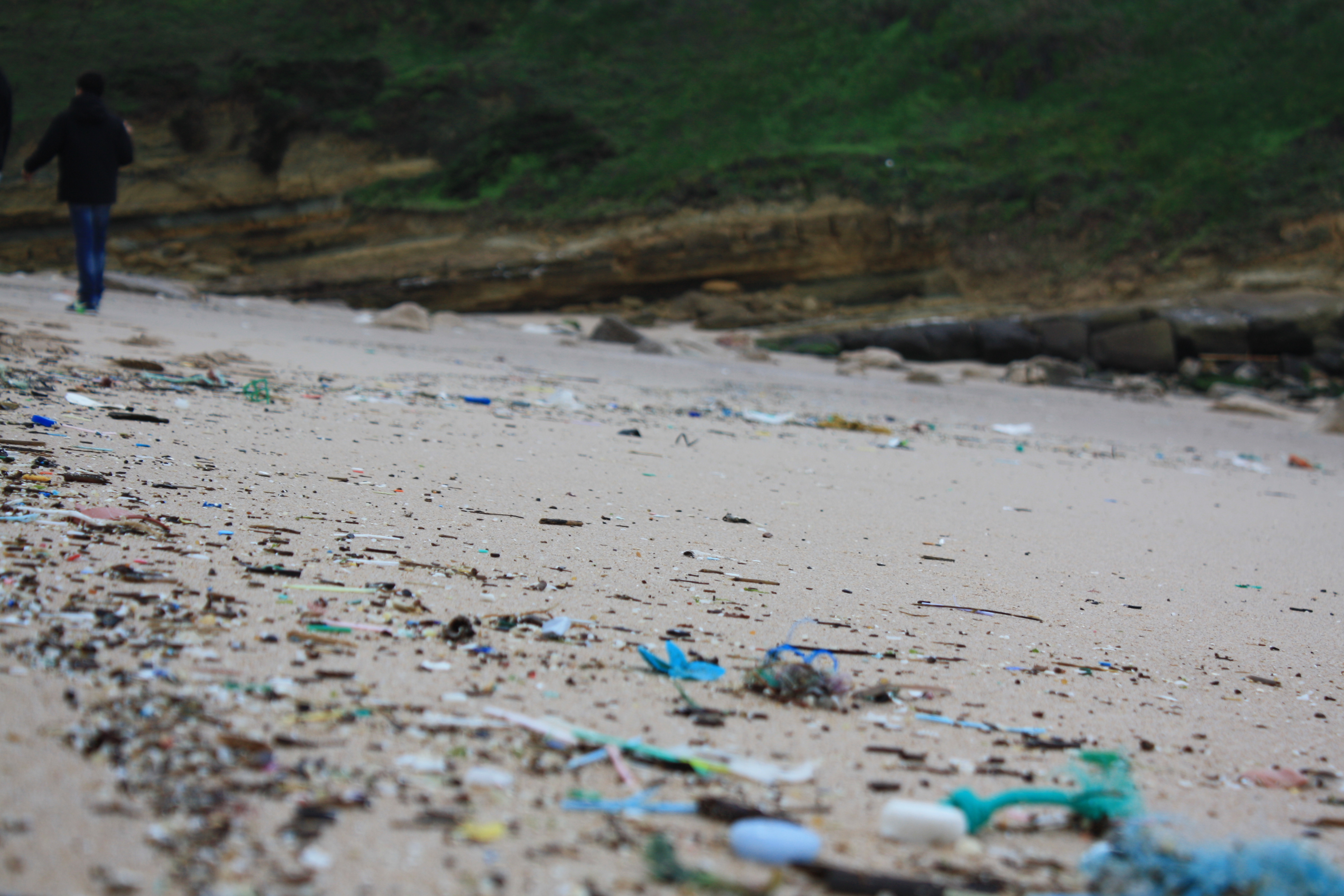
Beach littered with garbage

=== Plastic pollution ===
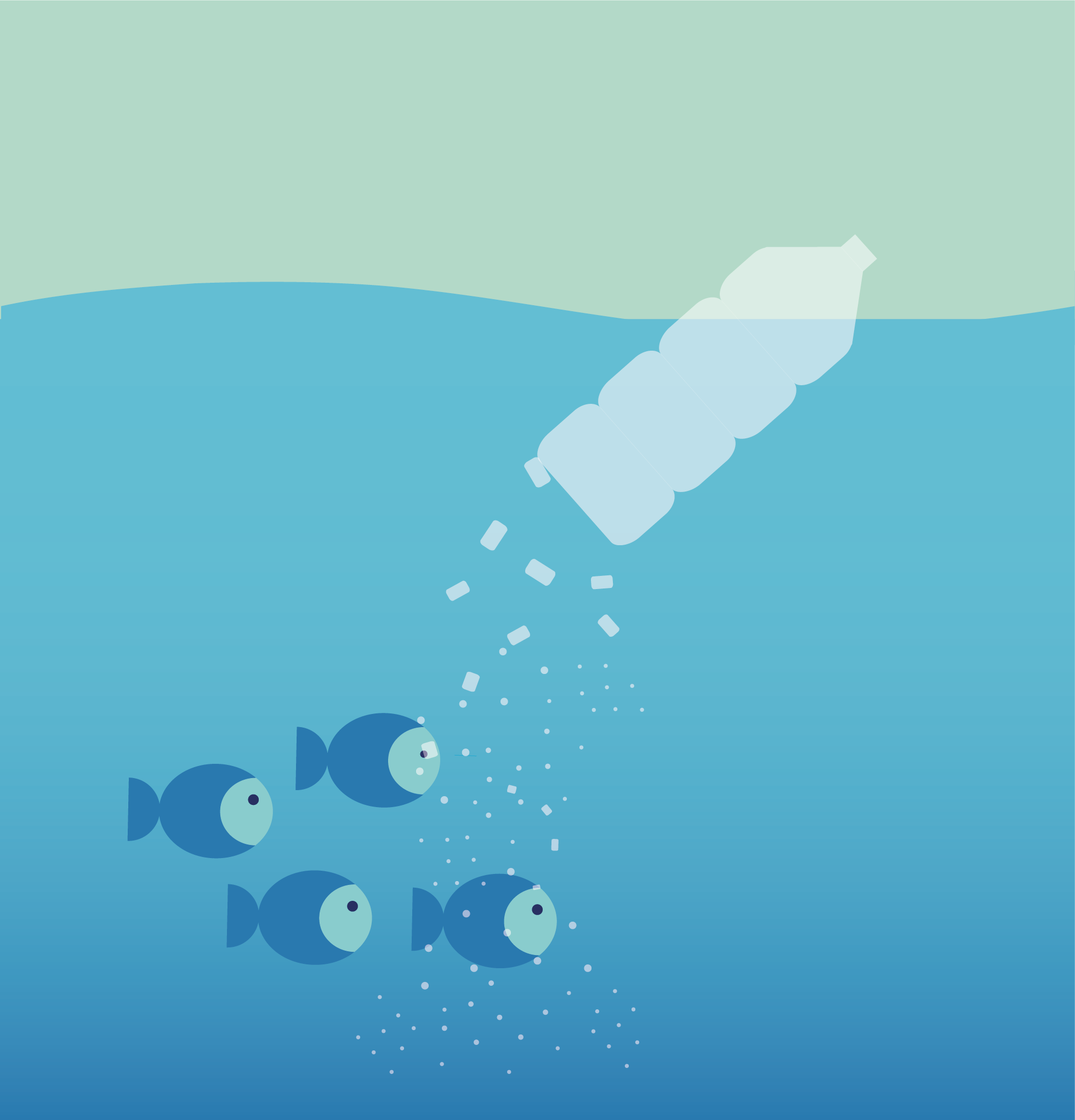
One type of marine pollution: the breakdown of a plastic bottle in the ocean into smaller fragments, eventually ending up as micro- and nano-plastics

Marine plastic pollution is a type of marine pollution caused by plastics ranging in size from large original material such as bottles and bags, down to microplastics formed from the fragmentation of plastic material. Marine debris is mainly discarded human rubbish which floats on, or is suspended in the ocean. Eighty percent of marine debris is plastic. Microplastics and nanoplastics result from the breakdown or photodegradation of plastic waste in surface waters, rivers or oceans. Recently, scientists have uncovered nanoplastics in heavy snow, more specifically about 3,000 tons that cover Switzerland yearly.

It is estimated that there is a stock of 86 million tons of plastic marine debris in the worldwide ocean as of the end of 2013, assuming that 1.4% of global plastics produced from 1950 to 2013 has entered the ocean and has accumulated there. Global consumption of plastics is estimated to be 300 million tonnes per year as of 2022, with around 8 million tonnes ending up in the oceans as macroplastics. Approximately 1.5 million tonnes of primary microplastics end up in the seas. Around 98% of this volume is created by land-based activities, with the remaining 2% being generated by sea-based activities. It is estimated that 19–23 million tonnes of plastic leaks into aquatic ecosystems annually. The 2017 United Nations Ocean Conference estimated that the oceans might contain more weight in plastics than fish by the year 2050.

Oceans are polluted by plastic particles ranging in size from large original material such as bottles and bags, down to microplastics formed from the fragmentation of plastic material. This material is only very slowly degraded or removed from the ocean so plastic particles are now widespread throughout the surface ocean and are known to be having deleterious effects on marine life. Discarded plastic bags, six-pack rings, cigarette butts and other forms of plastic waste which finish up in the ocean present dangers to wildlife and fisheries. Aquatic life can be threatened through entanglement, suffocation, and ingestion. Fishing nets, usually made of plastic, can be left or lost in the ocean by fishermen. Known as ghost nets, these entangle fish, dolphins, sea turtles, sharks, dugongs, crocodiles, seabirds, crabs, and other creatures, restricting movement, causing starvation, laceration, infection, and, in those that need to return to the surface to breathe, suffocation. There are various types of ocean plastics causing problems to marine life. Bottle caps have been found in the stomachs of turtles and seabirds, which have died because of the obstruction of their respiratory and digestive tracts. Ghost nets are also a problematic type of ocean plastic as they can continuously trap marine life in a process known as "ghost fishing".

=== Ocean acidification ===
Ocean acidification is the ongoing decrease in the pH of the Earth's ocean. Between 1950 and 2026, the average pH of the ocean surface fell from approximately 8.15 to 8.05. Carbon dioxide emissions from human activities are the primary cause of ocean acidification, with atmospheric carbon dioxide (CO_{2}) levels exceeding 422 ppm (as of 2024). CO_{2} from the atmosphere is absorbed by the oceans. This chemical reaction produces carbonic acid (H_{2}CO_{3}) which dissociates into a bicarbonate ion (HCO^{−}_{3}) and a hydrogen ion (H^{+}). The presence of free hydrogen ions (H^{+}) lowers the pH of the ocean, increasing acidity (this does not mean that seawater is acidic yet; It is still alkaline, with a pH higher than 8). Marine calcifying organisms, such as mollusks and corals, are especially vulnerable because they rely on calcium carbonate to build shells and skeletons.

A change in pH by 0.1 represents a 26% increase in hydrogen ion concentration in the world's oceans (the pH scale is logarithmic, so a change of one in pH units is equivalent to a tenfold change in hydrogen ion concentration). Sea-surface pH and carbonate saturation states vary depending on ocean depth and location. Colder and higher latitude waters are capable of absorbing more CO_{2}. This can cause acidity to rise, lowering the pH and carbonate saturation levels in these areas. Several other factors influence the atmosphere-ocean CO_{2} exchange, and thus local ocean acidification. These include ocean currents and upwelling zones, proximity to large continental rivers, sea ice coverage, and atmospheric exchange with nitrogen and sulfur from fossil fuel burning and agriculture.

A lower ocean pH has a range of potentially harmful effects for marine organisms. Scientists have observed for example reduced calcification, lowered immune responses, and reduced energy for basic functions such as reproduction. Ocean acidification can impact marine ecosystems that provide food and livelihoods for many people. About one billion people are wholly or partially dependent on the fishing, tourism, and coastal management services provided by coral reefs. Ongoing acidification of the oceans may therefore threaten food chains linked with the oceans.

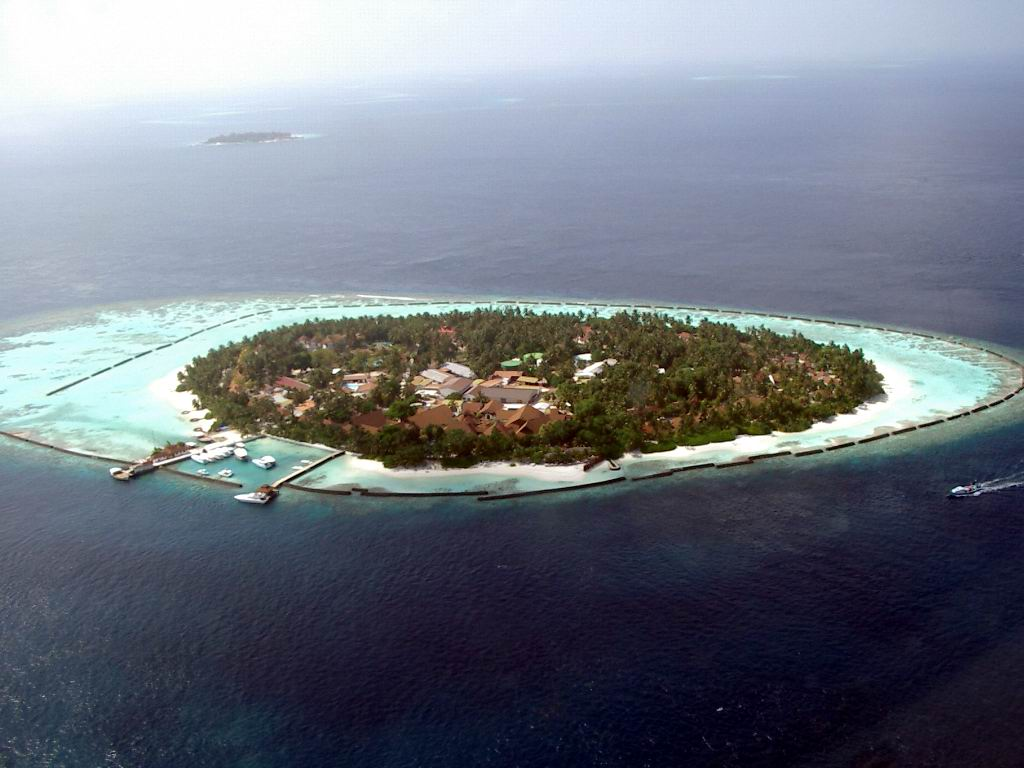
An island with a fringing reef in the Maldives. Coral reefs are dying around the world.

=== Nutrient pollution ===
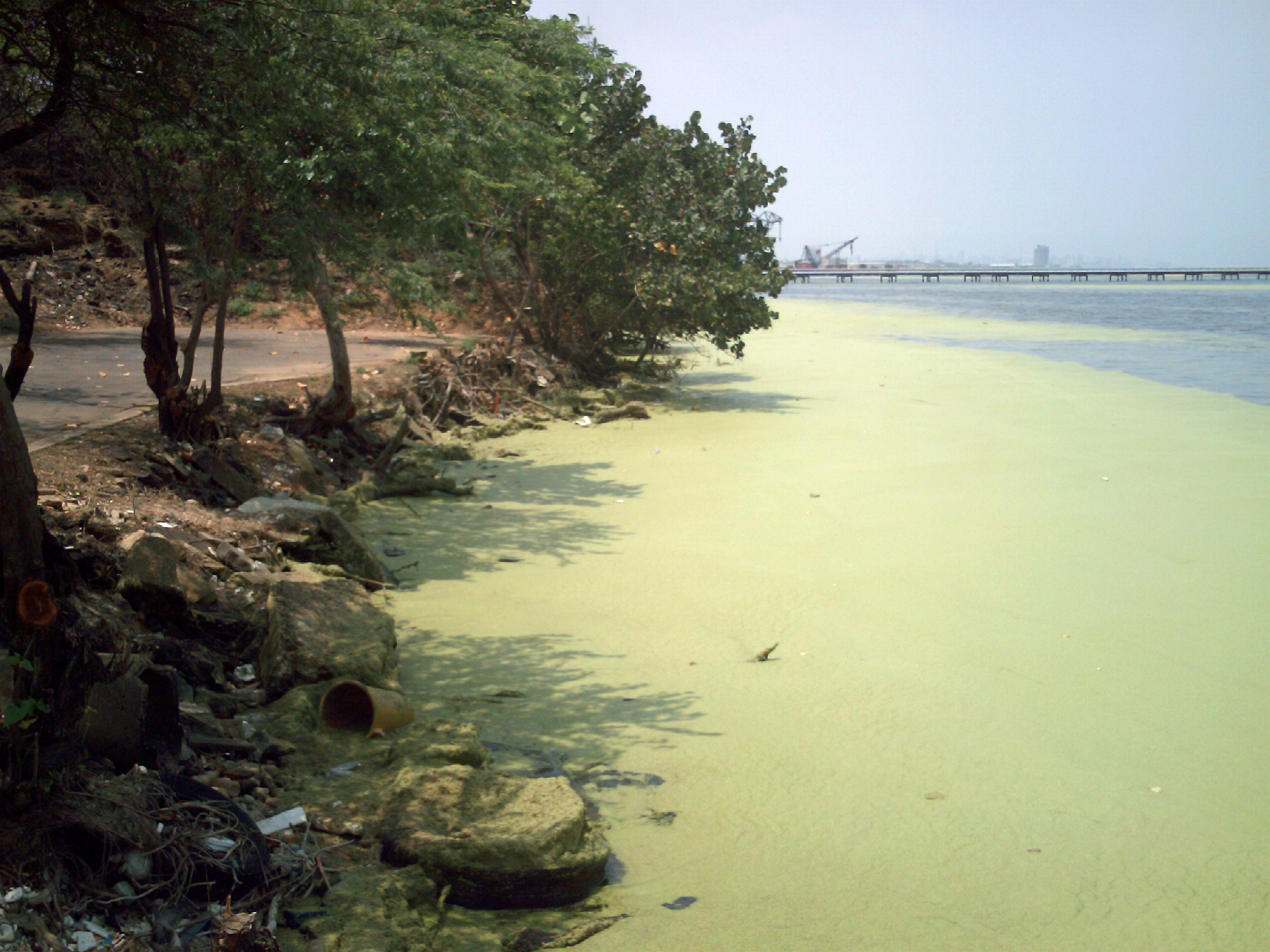
A polluted lagoon

The effect of eutrophication on marine benthic life

Eutrophication is an increase in chemical nutrients, typically compounds containing nitrogen or phosphorus, in an ecosystem. It can result in an increase in the ecosystem's primary productivity (excessive plant growth and decay), and further effects including lack of oxygen and severe reductions in water quality, fish, and other animal populations. Nutrient pollution, a form of water pollution, refers to contamination by excessive inputs of nutrients. It is a primary cause of eutrophication of surface waters, in which excess nutrients, usually nitrates or phosphates, stimulate algae growth. Such blooms are naturally occurring but may be increasing as a result of anthropogenic inputs or alternatively may be something that is now more closely monitored and so more frequently reported.

The biggest culprit are rivers that empty into the ocean, and with it the many chemicals used as fertilizers in agriculture as well as waste from livestock and humans. An excess of oxygen-depleting chemicals in the water can lead to hypoxia and the creation of a dead zone.

Estuaries tend to be naturally eutrophic because land-derived nutrients are concentrated where runoff enters the marine environment in a confined channel. The World Resources Institute has identified 375 hypoxic coastal zones around the world, concentrated in coastal areas in Western Europe, the Eastern and Southern coasts of the US, and East Asia, particularly in Japan. In the ocean, there are frequent red tide algae blooms that kill fish and marine mammals and cause respiratory problems in humans and some domestic animals when the blooms reach close to shore.

In addition to land runoff, atmospheric anthropogenic fixed nitrogen can enter the open ocean. A study in 2008 found that this could account for around one third of the ocean's external (non-recycled) nitrogen supply and up to three per cent of the annual new marine biological production. It has been suggested that accumulating reactive nitrogen in the environment may have consequences as serious as putting carbon dioxide in the atmosphere.

One proposed solution to eutrophication in estuaries is to restore shellfish populations, such as oysters. Oyster reefs remove nitrogen from the water column and filter out suspended solids, subsequently reducing the likelihood or extent of harmful algal blooms or anoxic conditions. Filter feeding activity is considered beneficial to water quality by controlling phytoplankton density and sequestering nutrients, which can be removed from the system through shellfish harvest, buried in the sediments, or lost through denitrification. Foundational work toward the idea of improving marine water quality through shellfish cultivation to was conducted by Odd Lindahl et al., using mussels in Sweden.

=== Industrial pollution and toxic chemicals ===
Apart from plastics, there are particular problems with other toxic pollutants that either do not break down or only very slowly in the marine environment. Examples of persistent toxicants are PCBs, DDT, TBT, pesticides, furans, dioxins, phenols, radioactive waste, and PFAS. Heavy metals are metallic chemical elements that have a relatively high density and are toxic or poisonous at low concentrations. Examples are mercury, lead, copper and cadmium. Some toxicants can accumulate in the tissues of many species of aquatic life in a process called bioaccumulation. They are also known to accumulate in benthic environments, such as estuaries and bay muds: a geological record of human activities of the last century.

DDT is a very toxic chemical that was used as a pesticide in mass quantities throughout the United States and is known to be neurotoxic, a reproductive toxin, an endocrine disruptor, and a carcinogen. DDT is a major focus of the book Silent Spring published by Rachel Carson in 1962. This is often attributed to launching the modern environmental movement and setting the stage for the creation of the EPA in 1970. DDT was banned in the U.S. two years later in 1972. Unfortunately, large quantities had already entered the ocean through runoff and had been dumped directly into the ocean. This toxin impacts marine ecosystems by accumulating from lower trophic levels and up the food chain into higher trophic levels such as from arctic cod into seals, from fish then eaten by dolphins, and from cod and eels into seals.

Shortly after Rachel Carson's publication of Silent Spring, PCBs were identified as another persistent, toxic chemical that has been released in extensive quantities to the environment. PCBs are a very well-studied class of chemicals that are manufactured from oil. These chemicals are banned in the United States under the Toxic Substance Control Act, but are still found in the soil, air, sediments, and biota. PCBs are known to accumulate in the fatty tissues of animals. In particular, PCBs build up and are stored in the blubber of marine mammals including dolphins and killer whales. These chemicals cause reproductive issues for many species. In mud crabs, PCBs have been discovered to be immunotoxic by reducing resistance to bacterial disease, reducing antioxidant enzyme activity, and damaging DNA responsible for immune system functions.

PFAS are an important emerging class of man-made persistent toxicants that contain extremely strong carbon-fluorine bonds which make these chemicals extremely difficult to break down. They have unique properties that make them useful for manufacturing a wide variety of products such as firefighting foams, clothing, carpets, and fast food wrappers. These useful properties in manufacturing unfortunately translate to problematic properties in the environment and organisms from plants to people. Because PFAS are not broken down in the environment, they have been circulated through the air and water to essentially all regions of the atmosphere, land, and ocean. These chemicals have many negative effects on marine life, such as significantly inhibited growth of phytoplankton over time and accumulation in seals, polar bears, and dolphins. Current research is underway investigating the full extent of the harm to marine ecosystems caused by PFAS.

Specific examples

- Chinese and Russian industrial pollution such as phenols and heavy metals in the Amur River have devastated fish stocks and damaged its estuary soil.
- Acute and chronic pollution events have been shown to impact southern California kelp forests, though the intensity of the impact seems to depend on both the nature of the contaminants and duration of exposure.
- Due to their high position in the food chain and the subsequent accumulation of heavy metals from their diet, mercury levels can be high in larger species such as bluefin and albacore. As a result, in March 2004 the United States FDA issued guidelines recommending that pregnant women, nursing mothers and children limit their intake of tuna and other types of predatory fish.
- Some shellfish and crabs can survive polluted environments, accumulating heavy metals or toxins in their tissues. For example, mitten crabs have a remarkable ability to survive in highly modified aquatic habitats, including polluted waters. The farming and harvesting of such species needs careful management if they are to be used as a food.
- Surface runoff of pesticides can alter the gender of fish species genetically, transforming male into female fish.
- Heavy metals enter the environment through oil spills – such as the Prestige oil spill on the Galician coast and Gulf of Mexico which unleashed an estimated 3.19 million barrels of oil – or from other natural or anthropogenic sources.
- In 2005, the 'Ndrangheta, an Italian mafia syndicate, was accused of sinking at least 30 ships loaded with toxic waste, much of it radioactive. This has led to widespread investigations into radioactive waste disposal rackets.
- Since the end of World War II, various nations, including the Soviet Union, the United Kingdom, the United States, and Germany, have disposed of chemical weapons in the Baltic Sea, raising concerns of environmental contamination.
- The Fukushima Daiichi nuclear disaster in 2011 caused radioactive toxins from the damaged power plant to leak into the air and ocean. There are still many isotopes in the ocean, which directly affects the benthic food web and also affects the whole food chain. The concentration of 137Cs in the bottom sediment that was contaminated by water with high concentrations in April–May 2011 remains quite high and is showing signs of very slow decrease with time.
- During the 20th century, large amounts of DDT, petroleum products, radioactive materials, sulphuric acid, and other toxins were dumped in the Pacific Ocean off the coast of Southern California.

=== Underwater noise ===
Marine life can be susceptible to noise or the sound pollution from sources such as passing ships, oil exploration seismic surveys, and naval low-frequency active sonar. Sound travels more rapidly and over larger distances in the sea than in the atmosphere. Between 1950 and 1975, ambient noise at one location in the Pacific Ocean increased by about ten decibels (that is a tenfold increase in intensity). Underwater noise pollution is unevenly distributed across marine environments, with the highest concentrations occurring in shipping lanes, port areas, and densely trafficked ocean routes. These areas experience sustained high ambient noise levels due to the dominance of older and larger vessels, which emit significant low-frequency noise (10 to 500 Hz) caused by engine vibrations, propeller cavitation, and hull turbulence. While advancements in ship design have shown potential to reduce noise emissions, older, noisier vessels remain prevalent in major shipping routes, largely due to economic and logistical constraints. Additionally, the overall increase in global shipping activity in the 20th century contributed to a rise of approximately 12 decibels in ambient noise levels in the Northern Hemisphere, particularly in the low-frequency range, which propagates over long distances with minimal attenuation. Studies in the Southern Hemisphere do not show a continuation of this trend in the 21st century. The cumulative effects of concentrated noise pollution pose a unique risk to localised ecosystems, particularly for species with limited mobility or specific habitat requirements, as they are unable to escape these high-noise regions. Research also highlights variations in noise behaviour across marine environments, with factors such as water depth, salinity, and seabed composition influencing how noise propagates in coastal areas versus open seas. The localised nature of underwater noise pollution amplifies its ecological consequences, particularly for species that rely on sound for survival.

The ecological impacts of underwater noise are most prevalent for marine mammals like whales and dolphins, which rely heavily on sound for communication, navigation, and foraging. Cetaceans, such as whales and dolphins, are especially vulnerable because they rely on echolocation and acoustic signals for communication and navigation. They experience disrupted communication patterns, altered migration routes, and stress-related behavioural changes as some of the consequences of chronic exposure to ship noise. For example, endangered whale populations in the Saguenay–St. Lawrence Marine Park experience considerable acoustic space reduction, limiting their communication ranges and altering their natural behaviours. Studies have shown that underwater noise can reduce communication ranges, impairing essential behaviours such as mating and social cohesion. Beyond marine mammals, fish and invertebrates are also affected, though they are less frequently studied. Fish use acoustic signals for mating, predator avoidance, and territory defence. Noise interference can cause habitat avoidance, reduced reproductive success, and disrupted predator-prey relationships, destabilising local food webs. These cumulative effects of URN contribute to the destabilisation of nutrient cycling and broader eco-system processes.

Noise also makes species communicate louder, which is called the Lombard vocal response. Whale songs are longer when submarine-detectors are on. If creatures don't "speak" loud enough, their voice can be masked by anthropogenic sounds. These unheard voices might be warnings, finding of prey, or preparations of net-bubbling. When one species begins speaking louder, it will mask other species voices, causing the whole ecosystem to eventually speak louder. Noise from ships and human activity can damage Cnidarians and Ctenophora, which are very important organisms in the marine ecosystem. They promote high diversity and they are used as models for ecology and biology because of their simple structures. When there is underwater noise, the vibrations in the water damage the cilia hairs in the Coelenterates. In a study, the organisms were exposed to sound waves for different numbers of times and the results showed that damaged hair cells were extruded or missing or presented bent, flaccid or missed kinocilia and stereocilia. Ships can be certified to meet certain noise criteria.

According to the oceanographer Sylvia Earle, "Undersea noise pollution is like the death of a thousand cuts. Each sound in itself may not be a matter of critical concern, but taken all together, the noise from shipping, seismic surveys, and military activity is creating a totally different environment than existed even 50 years ago. That high level of noise is bound to have a hard, sweeping impact on life in the sea."

Sources of noise below 100 Hz in the ocean include ships and airgun arrays. Other sources of ocean ambient sound in the same frequency range include earthquakes, volcanic eruptions, baleen whale calls, ice calving and winter storms.

Efforts to address underwater noise pollution remain limited. The International Maritime Organisation (IMO) introduced voluntary guidelines in 2014, encouraging measures such as the adoption of quieter ship designs, optimized propellers, and improved hull forms to reduce noise emissions. However, the non-mandatory nature of these guidelines has resulted in inconsistent adoption across the shipping industry. In contrast, the European Union's Marine Strategy Framework Directive (MSFD) mandates the management of underwater noise levels as part of achieving or maintaining Good Environmental Status (GES). Scholars argue that a combination of technical and economic measures is needed to tackle the issue effectively. These include mandatory noise limits, subsidies for retrofitting ships with quieter technologies, and spatially informed policies, such as the creation of quiet zones or Marine Protected Areas (MPAs), to safeguard sensitive ecosystems.

=== Light pollution ===
Underwater light can also contribute to marine pollution.

=== Other ===
There are a variety of secondary effects stemming not from the original pollutant, but a derivative condition. An example is silt-bearing surface runoff, which can inhibit the penetration of sunlight through the water column, hampering photosynthesis in aquatic plants. Dredge plumes can contain silt and thus have similar effects on aquatic life.

== Mitigation ==
Much anthropogenic pollution ends up in the ocean. The 2011 edition of the United Nations Environment Programme Year Book identifies as the main emerging environmental issues the loss to the oceans of massive amounts of phosphorus, "a valuable fertilizer needed to feed a growing global population", and the impact billions of pieces of plastic waste are having globally on the health of marine environments.

Bjorn Jennssen (2003) notes in his article, "Anthropogenic pollution may reduce biodiversity and productivity of marine ecosystems, resulting in reduction and depletion of human marine food resources". There are two ways the overall level of this pollution can be mitigated: either the human population is reduced, or a way is found to reduce the ecological footprint left behind by the average human. If the second way is not adopted, then the first way may be imposed as the world ecosystems falter.

The second way is for humans, individually, to pollute less. That requires social and political will, together with a shift in awareness so more people respect the environment and are less disposed to abuse it. At an operational level, regulations, and international government participation is needed. It is often very difficult to regulate marine pollution because pollution spreads over international barriers, thus making regulations hard to create as well as enforce.

Without appropriate awareness of marine pollution, the necessary global will to effectively address the issues may prove inadequate. Balanced information on the sources and harmful effects of marine pollution need to become part of general public awareness, and ongoing research is required to fully establish, and keep current, the scope of the issues. As expressed in Daoji and Dag's research, one of the reasons why environmental concern is lacking among the Chinese is because the public awareness is low and therefore should be targeted.

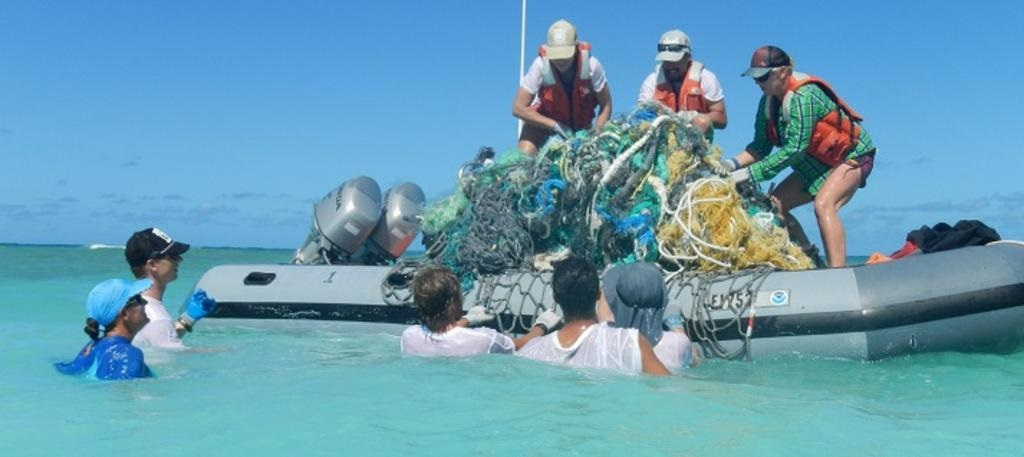
Marine debris removal in the Northwestern Hawaiian Islands (NOAA removed approximately 57 tons of derelict fishing nets and plastic litter from the Papahānaumokuākea Marine National Monument's tiny islands and atolls, sensitive coral reefs and shallow waters).

The amount of awareness on marine pollution is vital to the support of keeping the prevention of trash from entering waterways and ending up in our oceans. The EPA reports that in 2014 Americans generated about 258 million tons of waste, and only a third was recycled or composted. In 2015, there was over 8 million tons of plastic that made it into the ocean. The Ocean Conservancy reported that China, Indonesia, Philippines, Thailand, and Vietnam dump more plastic in the sea than all other countries combined. Through more sustainable packing this could lead to; eliminating toxic constituents, using fewer materials, making more readily available recyclable plastic. However, awareness can only take these initiatives so far. The most abundant plastic is PET (Polyethylene terephthalate) and is the most resistant to biodegradables. Researchers have been making great strides in combating this problem. In one way has been by adding a special polymer called a tetrablock copolymer. The tetrablock copolymer acts as a laminate between the PE and iPP which enables for an easier breakdown but still be tough. Through more awareness, individuals will become more cognizant of their carbon footprints. Also, from research and technology, more strides can be made to aid in the plastic pollution problem.Jellyfish have been considered a potential mitigating organism for pollution.

=== Global goals ===
In 2017, the United Nations adopted a resolution establishing Sustainable Development Goals, including reduced marine pollution as a measured goal under Goal 14. The international community has agreed that reducing pollution in the oceans is a priority, which is tracked as part of Sustainable Development Goal 14 which actively seeks to undo these human impacts on the oceans. The title of Target 14.1 is: "By 2025, prevent and significantly reduce marine pollution of all kinds, in particular from land-based activities, including marine debris and nutrient pollution."

== History ==
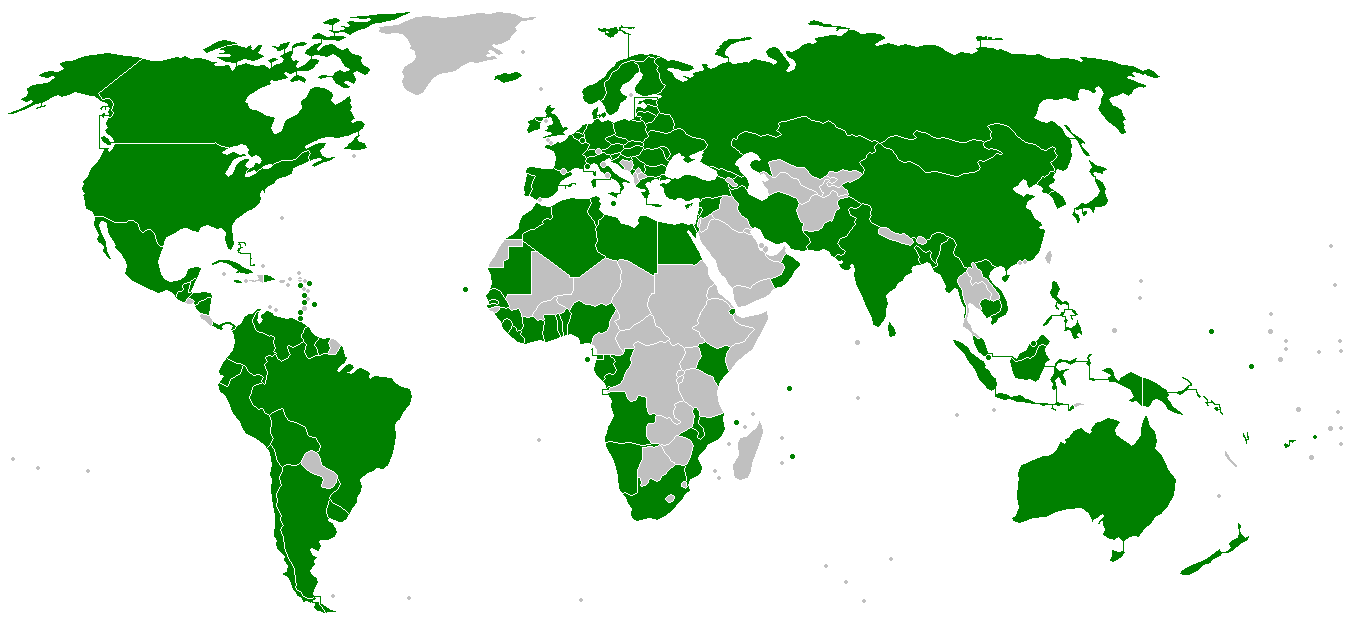
parties to the MARPOL 73/78 convention on marine pollution (as of April 2008)

Although marine pollution has a long history, significant international laws to counter it were not enacted until the twentieth century. Marine pollution was a concern during several United Nations Conventions on the Law of the Sea beginning in the 1950s. Most scientists believed that the oceans were so vast that they had unlimited ability to dilute, and thus render pollution harmless.

In the late 1950s and early 1960s, there were several controversies about dumping radioactive waste off the coasts of the United States by companies licensed by the Atomic Energy Commission, into the Irish Sea from the British reprocessing facility at Windscale, and into the Mediterranean Sea by the French Commissariat à l'Energie Atomique. After the Mediterranean Sea controversy, for example, Jacques Cousteau became a worldwide figure in the campaign to stop marine pollution. Marine pollution made further international headlines after the 1967 crash of the oil tanker Torrey Canyon, and after the 1969 Santa Barbara oil spill off the coast of California.

Marine pollution was a major area of discussion during the 1972 United Nations Conference on the Human Environment, held in Stockholm. That year also saw the signing of the Convention on the Prevention of Marine Pollution by Dumping of Wastes and Other Matter, sometimes called the London Convention. The London Convention did not ban marine pollution, but it established black and gray lists for substances to be banned (black) or regulated by national authorities (gray). Cyanide and high-level radioactive waste, for example, were put on the black list. The London Convention applied only to waste dumped from ships, and thus did nothing to regulate waste discharged as liquids from pipelines.

== Society and culture ==
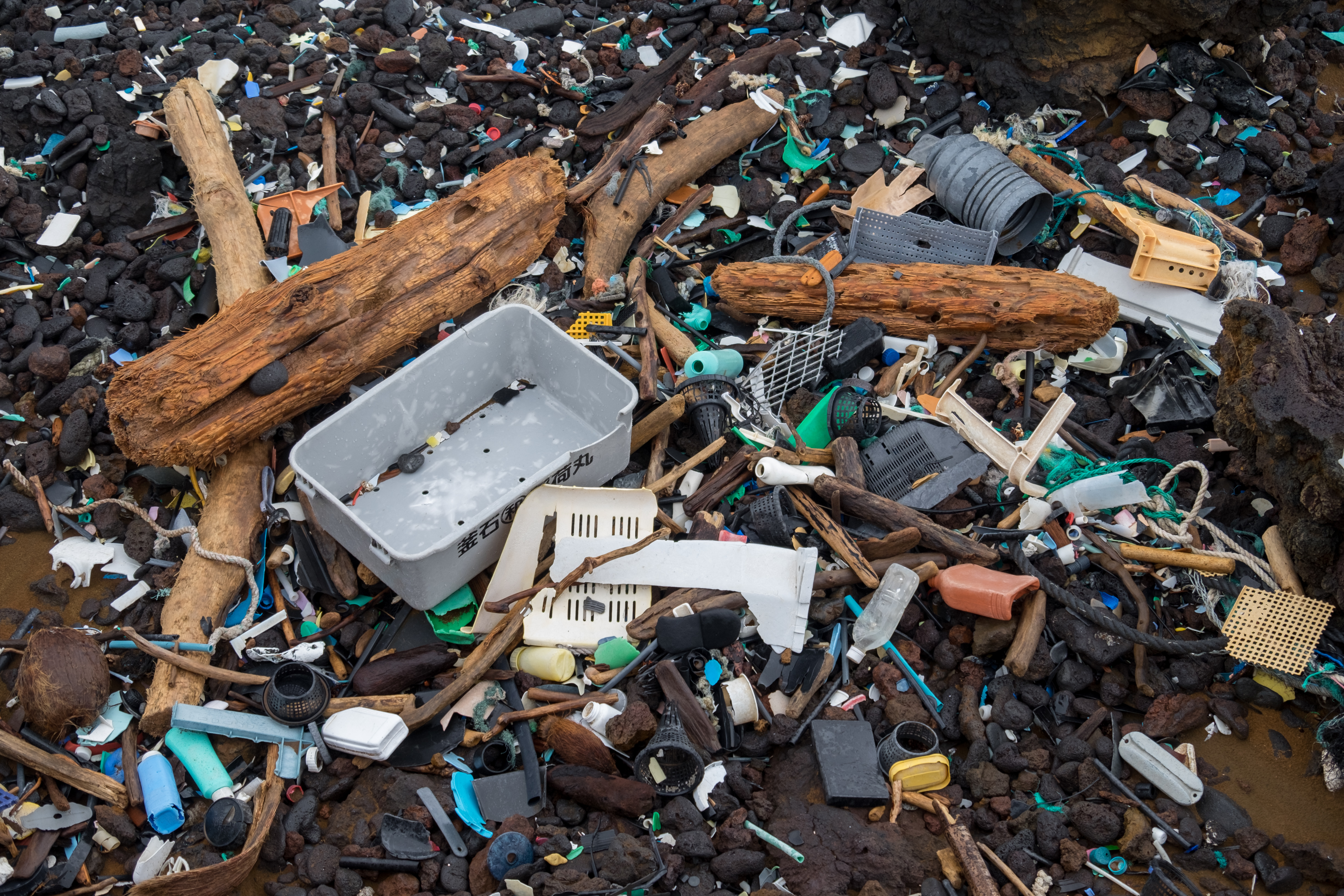
The Great Pacific Garbage Patch causes vast quantities of trash to wash ashore at the south end of Hawaii.

=== Laws and policies ===
There are different ways for the ocean to get polluted, therefore there have been multiple laws, policies, and treaties put into place throughout history. In order to protect the ocean from marine pollution, policies have been developed internationally.

- In 1948, Harry Truman signed a law formerly known as the Federal Water Pollution Control Act that allowed the federal government to control marine pollution in United States of America.
- In 1972, the Marine Protection, Research, and Sanctuaries Act of 1972 (MPRSA) was passed by the United States Congress, and regulates ocean dumping of waste in US waters.
- The 1954 Convention for the Prevention of Pollution of the Sea by Oil and the 1973 International Convention for the Prevention of Pollution by Ships were weakly enforced due to a lack of respect for the laws from flag states.
- In 1973 and 1978, MARPOL 73/78 was a treaty written to control vessel pollution, especially regarding oil. In 1983, the International Convention for the Prevention of Pollution from Ships enforced the MARPOL 73/78 treaty internationally.
- The 1982 United Nations Convention on the Law of the Sea (UNCLOS) was established to protect the marine environment by governing states to control their pollution to the ocean. It put restrictions on the amount of toxins and pollutants that come from all ships internationally.
- In 2006, the Marine Debris Research, Prevention and Reduction Ac. It was established by the National Oceanic and Atmospheric Administration (NOAA) to help identify, determine the source of, reduce and prevent marine debris.
- In December 2017, the UN Environmental Agency (UNEA) established the Ad Hoc Open-Ended Expert Group on Marine Litter and Microplastics with the purpose of examining marine plastic pollutions and to evaluate ways to handle the issue.
- In August 2023, the International Maritime Organization introduced Revised guidelines for the reduction of underwater radiated noise from shipping to address adverse impacts on marine life containing provisions to help limit the noise resulting from the ships, to ensure the impact of noise on the marine life is addressed.

== See also ==
- Aquatic toxicology – Study of manufactured products on aquatic organisms
- Environmental impact of pesticides – Environmental effect
- Mercury pollution in the ocean – Mercury contamination in sea and sediments
- Oil pollution toxicity to marine fish
- Plasticosis – Disease caused by small pieces of plastic
- Stockholm Convention on Persistent Organic Pollutants – International environmental treaty
- Sea snot – Type of organic matter found in the sea
- World Oceans Day – Observance day on or around June 8
