= Sediment quality triad =

Aquatic toxicology technique

In aquatic toxicology, the sediment quality triad (SQT) approach has been used as an assessment tool to evaluate the extent of sediment degradation resulting from contaminants released due to human activity present in aquatic environments (Chapman, 1990). This evaluation focuses on three main components: 1.) sediment chemistry, 2.) sediment toxicity tests using aquatic organisms, and 3.) the field effects on the benthic organisms (Chapman, 1990). Often used in risk assessment, the combination of three lines of evidence can lead to a comprehensive understanding of the possible effects to the aquatic community (Chapman, 1997). Although the SQT approach does not provide a cause-and-effect relationship linking concentrations of individual chemicals to adverse biological effects, it does provide an assessment of sediment quality commonly used to explain sediment characteristics quantitatively. The information provided by each portion of the SQT is unique and complementary, and the combination of these portions is necessary because no single characteristic provides comprehensive information regarding a specific site (Chapman, 1997)

== Components ==
=== Sediment chemistry ===
Sediment chemistry provides information on contamination, however it does not provide information of biological effects (Chapman, 1990). Sediment chemistry is used as a screening tool to determine the contaminants that are most likely to be destructive to organisms present in the benthic community at a specific site. During analysis, sediment chemistry data does not depend strictly on comparisons to sediment quality guidelines when utilizing the triad approach. Rather, sediment chemistry data, once collected for the specific site, is compared to the most relevant guide values, based on site characteristics, to assess which chemicals are of the greatest concern. This technique is used because no one set of data is adequate for all situations. This allows you to identify the chemicals of concern, which most frequently exceed effects-based guidelines. Once the chemical composition of the sediment is determined and the most concerning contaminants have been identified, toxicity tests are conducted to link environmental concentrations to potential adverse effects.

=== Sediment toxicity ===
Sediment toxicity is evaluated based on bioassay analysis. Standard bioassay toxicity tests are utilized and are not organism restricted (Chapman, 1997). Differences in mechanisms of exposure and organism physiology must be taken into account when selecting your test organisms, and you must be able to adequately justify the use of that organism. These bioassay tests evaluate effects based on different toxicological endpoints. The toxicity tests are conducted with respect to the chemicals of concern at environmentally relevant concentrations identified by the sediment chemistry portion of the triad approach. Chapman (1990) lists typically used endpoints, which include lethal endpoints such as mortality, and sublethal endpoints such as growth, behavior, reproduction, cytotoxicity and optionally bioaccumulation. Often pilot studies are utilized to assist in the selection of the appropriate test organism and end points. Multiple endpoints are recommended and each of the selected endpoints must adequately complement each of the others (Chapman, 1997). Effects are evaluated using statistical methods that allow for the distinction between responses that are significantly different than negative controls. If sufficient data is generated, minimum significant differences (MSDs) are calculated using power analyses and applied to toxicity tests to determine the difference between statistical difference and ecological relevance.

The function of the toxicity portion of the triad approach is to allow you to estimate the effects in the field. While laboratory based experiments simplify a complex and dynamic environment, toxicity results allow the potential for field extrapolation. This creates a link of exposure and effect and allows the determination of an exposure-response relationship. When combined with the other two components of the Sediment Quality Triad it allows for a holistic understanding between cause and effect.

=== Field effects on benthic organisms ===
The analysis of field effects on benthic organisms functions to assess the potential for community based effects resulting from the identified contaminants. This is done because benthic organisms are sessile and location specific, allowing them to be used as accurate markers of contaminant effect (Chapman, 1990). This is done through conducting field-based tests, which analyze changes in benthic community structures focusing on changes in number of species, abundance, and percentage of major taxonomic groups (Chapman, 1997). Changes in benthic communities are typically quantified using a principal component analysis and classification (Chapman, 1997). There is no one specifically defined method for conducting these field assessments, however the different multivariate analysis typically produce results identifying relationships between variables when a robust correlation exists.

Knowledge of the site-specific ecosystem and the ecological roles of dominant species within that ecosystem are critical to producing biological evidence of alteration in benthic community resultant of contaminant exposure. When possible, it is recommended to observe changes in community structure that directly relate to the test species used during the sediment toxicity portion of the triad approach in order to produce the most reliable evidence.

=== Bioaccumulation ===
Bioaccumulation should be considered during the utilization of the triad approach depending on the study goals. It preparation for measuring bioaccumulation, it must be specified if the test will serve to assess secondary poisoning or biomagnification (Chapman, 1997). Bioaccumulation analysis should be conducted appropriately based on the contaminants of concern (for example, metals do not biomagnify). This can be done with field-collected, caged organisms, or laboratory exposed organisms (Chapman, 1997). While the bioaccumulation portion is recommended, it is not required. However, it serves an important role with the purpose of quantifying effects due to trophic transfer of contaminants through consumption of contaminated prey.

=== Pollution-induced degradation ===
Site-specific pollution induced degradation is measured through the combination of the three portions of the sediment quality triad. The sediment chemistry, sediment toxicity, and the field effects to benthic organisms are compared quantitatively. Data is most useful when it has been normalized to reference site values by converting them to reference-to-ratio values (Chapman et al. 1986; Chapman 1989). The reference site is chosen to be the site with the least contamination with respect to the other sites sampled. Once normalized, data between portions of the triad are able to be compared even when large differences in measurements or units exits (Chapman, 1990). From the combination of the results from each portion of the triad a multivariate figure is developed and used to determine the level of degradation.

== Methods and interpretation ==
No single method can assess impact of contamination-induced degradation of sediment across aquatic communities. Methods of each component of the triad should be selected for efficacy and relevance in lab and field tests. Application of the SQT is typically location-specific and can be used to compare differences in sediment quality temporally or across regions (Chapman, 1997).

=== Multiple lines of evidence ===
The SQT incorporates three lines of evidence (LOE) to provide direct assessment of sediment quality. The chemistry, toxicity, and benthic components of the triad each provide a LOE, which is then integrated into a Weight of evidence.

==== Criteria ====
In order to qualify for SQT assessment chemistry, toxicity, and in situ measurements must be collected synoptically using standardized methods of sediment quality. A control sample is necessary to evaluate impact of contaminated sites. An appropriate reference is a whole sediment sample (particles and associated pore water) collected near area of concern and is representative of background conditions in the absence of contaminants. Evidence of contaminant exposure and biological effect is required in order to assign a site as chemically impacted.

==== Framework ====
The chemistry component incorporates both bioavailability and potential effects on benthic community. The potential of sediment toxicity for a given site is based on a linear regression model (LRM). A chemical score index (CSI) of the contaminant describes the magnitude of exposure relative to benthic community disturbance. An optimal set of index-specific thresholds are selected for the chemistry component by statistically comparing several candidates to evaluate which set exhibited greatest overall agreement (Bay and Weisberg, 2012). The magnitude of sediment toxicity is determined by multiple toxicity tests conducted in the lab to complement chemistry component. Toxicity LOE are determined by the mean of toxicity category score from all relevant tests. Development of LOE for benthic component is based on community metrics and abundance. Several indices such as benthic response index (BRI), benthic biotic integrity (IBI), and relative biotic index (RBI) are utilized to assess biological response of the benthic community. The median score of all individual indices will establish benthic LOE.

Each component of the triad is assigned a response category: minimal, low, moderate, or high disturbance relative to background conditions. Individual LOEs are ranked into categories by comparing test results of each component to established thresholds (Bay and Weisberg, 2012). Integration of benthos and toxicity LOE classify the severity and effects of contamination. LOE of chemistry and toxicity are combined to assign the potential of chemically-mediated effects.

A site is assigned an impact category by integrating the severity of effect and the potential of chemically mediated effects. The conditions of individual sites of concern are assigned an impact category between 1 and 5 (with 1 being unimpacted and 5 being clearly impacted by contamination). The SQT triad can also classify impact as inconclusive in cases when LOE between components are in disagreement or additional information is required (Bay and Weisberg, 2012).

==== Triaxial graphs ====
SQT measurements are scaled proportionately by relative impact and visually represented on triaxial graphs. Evaluation of sediment integrity and interrelationships between components can be determined by the size and morphology of the triangle. The magnitude of the triangle is indicative of the relative impact of contamination. Equilateral triangles imply agreement among components. (USEPA, 1994)

== Evaluation ==
=== Advantages of triad approach ===
The SQT approach has been praised for a variety of reasons as a technique for characterizing sediment conditions. Relative to the depth of information it provides, and the inclusive nature, it is very cost effective. It can be applied to all sediment classifications, and even adapted to soil and water column assessments (Chapman and McDonald 2005). A decision matrix can be employed such that all three measures be analyzed simultaneously, and a deduction of possible ecological impacts be made (USEPA 1994)

Other advantages of the SQT include information on the potential bioaccumulation and biomagnifcation effects of contaminants, and its flexibility in application, resulting from its design as a framework rather than a formula or standard method. By using multiple lines of evidence, there are a host of ways to manipulate and interpret SQT data (Bay and Weisberg 2012). It has been accepted on an international scale as the most comprehensive approach to assessing sediment (Chapman and McDonald 2005). The SQT approach to sediment testing has been used in North America, Europe, Australia, South America, and the Antarctic.

=== Application to sediment management standards ===
Stemming from the National Pollutant Discharge Elimination System (NPDES) EPA permitting guidelines, point and nonpoint discharges may adversely affect sediment quality. As per state regulatory criteria, information on point and nonpoint source contamination, and its effects on sediment quality may be required for assessment of compliance. For example, Washington State Sediment Management Standards, Part IV, mandates sediment control standards which allow for establishment of discharge sediment monitoring requirements, and criteria for creation and maintenance of sediment impact zones (WADOE 2013). In this instance, the SQT could be particularly useful encompassing multiple relevant analyses simultaneously.

=== Limitations and criticisms ===
Although there are numerous benefits in using the SQT approach, drawbacks in its use have been identified. The major limitations include: lack of statistical criteria development within the framework, large database requirements, difficulties in chemical mixture application, and data interpretation can be laboratory intensive (Chapman 1989). The SQT does not evidently consider the bioavailability of complexed or sediment-associated contaminants (FDEP 1994). Lastly, it is difficult to translate laboratory toxicity results to biological effects seen in the field (Kamlet 1989).
