= Aquatic toxicology =

Study of manufactured products on aquatic organisms

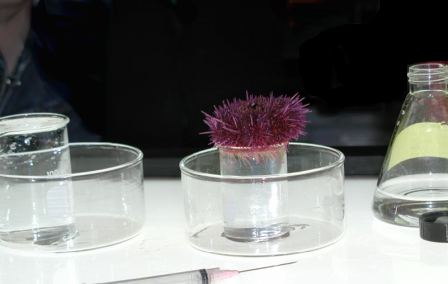
A purple sea urchin being tested for pollution using a whole effluent toxicity method.

Aquatic toxicology is the study of the effects of manufactured chemicals and other anthropogenic and natural materials and activities on aquatic organisms at various levels of organization, from subcellular through individual organisms to communities and ecosystems. Aquatic toxicology is a multidisciplinary field which integrates toxicology, aquatic ecology and aquatic chemistry.

This field of study includes freshwater, marine water and sediment environments. Common tests include standardized acute and chronic toxicity tests lasting 24–96 hours (acute test) to 7 days or more (chronic tests). These tests measure endpoints such as survival, growth, reproduction, that are measured at each concentration in a gradient, along with a control test. Typically using selected organisms with ecologically relevant sensitivity to toxicants and a well-established literature background. These organisms can be easily acquired or cultured in lab and are easy to handle.

== History ==
While basic research in toxicology began in multiple countries in the 1800s, it was not until around the 1930s that the use of acute toxicity testing, especially on fish, was established. Due to the wide use of the organochlorine pesticide DDT and its linkage to causing fish death, the field of aquatic toxicology grew. At first, studies focused mainly on oysters and mussels, as they could not move away from the toxic environment. The results of these studies eventually led to the implementation of programs that monitor concentrations of aquatic pollutants in oysters and mussels, such as the Mussel Watch program of the National Oceanic and Atmospheric Administration (NOAA). Over the next two decades, the effects of chemicals and wastes on non-human species became more of a public issue and the era of the pickle-jar bioassays began as efforts increased to standardize toxicity testing techniques.

In the United States, the passage of the Federal Water Pollution Control Act of 1947 marked the first comprehensive legislation for the control of water pollution and was followed by the Federal Water Pollution Control Act in 1956. In 1962, public and governmental interests were renewed, in large part due to the publication of Rachel Carson's Silent Spring, and three years later the Water Quality Act of 1965 was passed, which directed states to develop water quality standards. Public awareness, as well as scientific and governmental concern, continued to grow throughout the 1970s and by the end of the decade research had expanded to include hazard evaluation and risk analysis. In the subsequent decades, aquatic toxicology has continued to expand and internationalize so that there is now a strong application of toxicity testing for environmental protection.

Aquatic toxicology is continuing to evolve as risk assessment is becoming more practiced in the field. The field is gaining popularity as it has begun to link the effects of pollutants on marine animals to humans who eat fish and other marine life.

== Aquatic toxicity tests ==
Aquatic toxicology tests (assays): toxicity tests are used to provide qualitative and quantitative data on adverse (deleterious) effects on aquatic organisms from a toxicant. Toxicity tests can be used to assess the potential for damage to an aquatic environment and provide a database that can be used to assess the risk associated within a situation for a specific toxicant. Aquatic toxicology tests can be performed in the field or in the laboratory. Field experiments generally refer to multiple species exposure, but single species can be caged for a set duration, and laboratory experiments generally refer to single species exposure. A dose–response relationship is most commonly used with a sigmoidal curve to quantify the toxic effects at a selected end-point or criteria for effect (i.e. death or other adverse effect to the organism). Concentration is on the x-axis and percent inhibition or response is on the y-axis.

The criteria for effects, or endpoints tested for, can include lethal and sublethal effects (see Toxicological effects).

There are different types of toxicity tests that can be performed on various test species. Different species differ in their susceptibility to chemicals, most likely due to differences in accessibility, metabolic rate, excretion rate, genetic factors, dietary factors, age, sex, health and stress level of the organism. Common standard test species are the fathead minnow (Pimephales promelas), daphnids (Daphnia magna, D. pulex, D. pulicaria, Ceriodaphnia dubia), midge (Chironomus tentans, C. riparius), rainbow trout (Oncorhynchus mykiss), sheepshead minnow (Cyprinodon variegatu), zebra fish (Danio rerio), mysids (Mysidopsis), oyster (Crassotreas), scud (Hyalalla Azteca), grass shrimp (Palaemonetes pugio) and mussels (Mytilus galloprovincialis). As defined by ASTM International, these species are routinely selected on the basis of availability, commercial, recreational, and ecological importance, past successful use, and regulatory use.

A variety of acceptable standardized test methods have been published. Some of the more widely accepted agencies to publish methods are: the American Public Health Association, US Environmental Protection Agency (EPA), ASTM International, International Organization for Standardization, Environment and Climate Change Canada, and Organisation for Economic Co-operation and Development. Standardized tests offer the ability to compare results between laboratories.

There are many kinds of toxicity tests widely accepted in the scientific literature and by regulatory agencies. The type of test used depends on many factors: Specific regulatory agency conducting the test, resources available, physical and chemical characteristics of the environment, type of toxicant, test species available, laboratory vs. field testing, end-point selection, and time and resources available to conduct the assays are some of the most common influencing factors on test design.

=== Exposure systems ===
Exposure systems are four general techniques the controls and test organisms are exposed to the dealing with treated and diluted water or the test solutions.

- Static. A static test exposes the organism in still water. The toxicant is added to the water in order to obtain the correct concentrations to be tested. The control and test organisms are placed in the test solutions and the water is not changed for the entirety of the test.
- Recirculation. A recirculation test exposes the organism to the toxicant in a similar manner as the static test, except that the test solutions are pumped through an apparatus (i.e. filter) to maintain water quality, but not reduce the concentration of the toxicant in the water. The water is circulated through the test chamber continuously, similar to an aerated fish tank. This type of test is expensive and it is unclear whether or not the filter or aerator has an effect on the toxicant.
- Renewal. A renewal test also exposes the organism to the toxicant in a similar manner as the static test because it is in still water. However, in a renewal test the test solution is renewed periodically (constant intervals) by transferring the organism to a fresh test chamber with the same concentration of toxicant.
- Flow-through. A flow-through test exposes the organism to the toxicant with a flow into the test chambers and then out of the test chambers. The once-through flow can either be intermittent or continuous. A stock solution of the correct concentrations of contaminant must be previously prepared. Metering pumps or diluters will control the flow and the volume of the test solution, and the proper proportions of water and contaminant will be mixed.

=== Types of tests ===
Acute tests are short-term exposure tests (14 days or less) and generally use lethality as an endpoint. In acute exposures, organisms come into contact with higher doses of the toxicant in a single event or in multiple events over a short period of time and usually produce immediate effects, depending on absorption time of the toxicant. These tests are generally conducted on organisms during a specific time period of the organism's life cycle, and are considered partial life cycle tests. Acute tests are not valid if mortality in the control sample is greater than 10%. However, this control acceptability criterion is dependent upon the species and the duration of the test. Results are reported in EC50, or concentration that will affect fifty percent of the sample size.

Chronic tests are long-term tests (weeks, months years), relative to the test organism's life span (>10% of life span), and generally use sub-lethal endpoints. In chronic exposures, organisms come into contact with low, continuous doses of a toxicant. Chronic exposures may induce effects to acute exposure, but can also result in effects that develop slowly. Chronic tests are generally considered full life cycle tests and cover an entire generation time or reproductive life cycle ("egg to egg"). Chronic tests are not considered valid if mortality in the control sample is greater than 20%. These results have generally been reported in NOECs (No observed effects level) and LOECs (Lowest observed effects level). However, NOECs and LOECs are becoming less common as endpoints are dependent on the concentration series chosen for the test. These reports are starting to become a topic of debate in the field because of the way it may alter the results of the tests. For example, if the concentration rate of the NOEC is 100, 50, 25, 11.25, 6.25 and the toxicology is reported at 2%, the NOEC would report the concentration as 6.25.

Early life stage tests are considered as subchronic exposures that are less than a complete reproductive life cycle and include exposure during early, sensitive life stages of an organism. These exposures are also called critical life stage, embryo-larval, or egg-fry tests. Early life stage tests are not considered valid if mortality in the control sample is greater than 30%.

Short-term sublethal tests are used to evaluate the toxicity of effluents to aquatic organisms. These methods are developed by the EPA, and only focus on the most sensitive life stages. Endpoints for these test include changes in growth, reproduction and survival. NOECs, LOECs and EC50s are reported in these tests.

Bioaccumulation tests are toxicity tests that can be used for hydrophobic chemicals that may accumulated in the fatty tissue of aquatic organisms. Toxicants with low solubilities in water generally can be stored in the fatty tissue due to the high lipid content in this tissue. The storage of these toxicants within the organism may lead to cumulative toxicity. Bioaccumulation tests use bioconcentration factors (BCF) to predict concentrations of hydrophobic contaminants in organisms. The BCF is the ratio of the average concentration of test chemical accumulated in the tissue of the test organism (under steady state conditions) to the average measured concentration in the water.

Freshwater tests and saltwater tests have different standard methods, especially as set by the regulatory agencies. However, these tests generally include a control (negative and/or positive), a geometric dilution series or other appropriate logarithmic dilution series, test chambers and equal numbers of replicates, and a test organism. Exact exposure time and test duration will depend on type of test (acute vs. chronic) and organism type. Temperature, water quality parameters and light will depend on regulator requirements and organism type.

In the US, many wastewater dischargers (e.g., factories, power plants, refineries, mines, municipal sewage treatment plants) are required to conduct periodic whole effluent toxicity (WET) tests under the National Pollutant Discharge Elimination System (NPDES) permit program, pursuant to the Clean Water Act. For facilities discharging to freshwater, effluent is used to perform static-acute multi-concentration toxicity tests with Ceriodaphnia dubia (water flea) and Pimephales promelas (fathead minnow), among other species. The test organisms are exposed for 48 hours under static conditions with five concentrations of the effluent. The major deviation in the short-term chronic effluent toxicity tests and the acute effluent toxicity tests is that the short-term chronic test lasts for seven days and the acute test lasts for 48 hours. For discharges to marine and estuarine waters, the test species used are sheepshead minnow (Cyprinodon variegatus), inland silverside (Menidia beryllina), Americamysis bahia, and purple sea urchin (Strongylocentrotus purpuratus).

=== Sediment tests ===
At some point most chemicals originating from both anthropogenic and natural sources accumulate in sediment. For this reason, sediment toxicity can play a major role in the adverse biological effects seen in aquatic organisms, especially those inhabiting benthic habitats. A recommended approach for sediment testing is to apply the sediment quality triad (SQT) which involves simultaneously examining sediment chemistry, toxicity, field alterations, bioaccumulation, and bioavailability assessments that can be used in a laboratory or in the field. Due to the expansion of SQTs, it is now more commonly referred to as "Sediment Assessment Framework." Collection, handling, and storage of sediment can have an effect on bioavailability and for this reason standard methods have been developed to suit this purpose.

== Toxicological effects ==
Toxicity can be broken down into two broad categories of direct and indirect toxicity. Direct toxicity results from a toxicant acting at the site of action in or on the organism. Indirect toxicity occurs with a change in the physical, chemical, or biological environment.

Lethality is most common effect used in toxicology and used as an endpoint for acute toxicity tests. While conducting chronic toxicity tests sublethal effects are endpoints that are looked at. These endpoints include behavioral, physiological, biochemical, and histological changes.

There are a number of effects that occur when an organism is simultaneously exposed to two or more toxicants. These effects include additive effects, synergistic effects, potentiation effects, and antagonistic effects. An additive effect occurs when combined effect is equal to a combination or sum of the individual effects. A synergistic effect occurs when the combination of effects is much greater than the two individual effects added together. Potentiation is an effect that occurs when an individual chemical has no effect is added to a toxicant, and the combination has a greater effect than just the toxicant alone. Finally, an antagonistic effect occurs when a combination of chemicals has less of an effect than the sum of their individual effects.

== Important aquatic toxicology resources ==
- ASTM International (formerly American Society for Testing and Materials). A consensus-based organization, representing over 140 participating countries, that develops and delivers international voluntary standard methods for aquatic toxicity testing.
- Standard Methods for the Examination of Water and Wastewater. A compilation of techniques for water analysis, jointly published by the American Public Health Association (APHA), the American Water Works Association (AWWA), and the Water Environment Federation.
- "Ecotox." A database maintained by EPA that offers single chemical toxicity information for both aquatic and terrestrial purposes.
- Society of Environmental Toxicology and Chemistry (SETAC). A nonprofit, worldwide society working to promote scientific research to further our understanding of environmental stressors, environmental education, and the use of science in environmental policy.
- EPA publishes guidance manuals outlining aquatic toxicity test procedures.
- Organisation for Economic Co-operation and Development (OECD). A forum for governments to work together to promote policies for the betterment of people's social and economic well-being around the world. One way in which they accomplish this is through the development of aquatic toxicity test guidelines.
- Environment and Climate Change Canada. Canada's lead federal agency for environmental protection.

== Terminology ==
- Median Lethal Concentration (LC50) – The chemical concentration that is expected to kill 50% of a group of organisms.
- Median Effective Concentration (EC50) – The chemical concentration that is expected to have one or more specified effects in 50% of a group of organisms.
- Critical Body Residue (CBR) – An approach that routinely examines whole-body chemical concentrations of an exposed organism that is associated with an adverse biological response.
- Baseline toxicity – Refers to narcosis which is a depression in biological activity due to toxicants being present in the organism.
- Biomagnification – The process by which the concentration of a chemical in the tissues of an organism increases as it passes through several levels in the food web.
- Lowest Observed Effect Concentration (LOEC) – The lowest test concentration that has a statistically significant effect over a specified exposure time.
- No Observed Effect Concentration (NOEC) – The highest test concentration for which no effect is observed relative to a control over a specified exposure time.
- Maximum Acceptable Toxicant Concentration (MATC) – An estimated value that represents the highest "no-effect" concentration of a specific substance within the range including the NOEC and LOEC.
- Application Factor (AF) – An empirically derived "safe" concentration of a chemical.
- Biomonitoring – The consistent use of living organisms to analyze environmental changes over time.
- Effluent – Liquid, industrial discharge that usually contain varying chemical toxicants.
- Quantitative Structure-Activity Relationship (QSAR) – A method of modeling the relationship between biological activity and the structure of organic chemicals.
- Mode of Action – A set of common behavioral or physiological signs that represent a type of adverse response.
- Mechanism of Action – The detailed events that take place at the molecular level during an adverse biological response.
- K_{OW} – The octanol-water partition coefficient which represents the ratio of the concentration of octanol to the concentration of chemical in the water.
- Bioconcentration Factor (BCF) – The ratio of the average chemical concentration in the tissues of the organism under steady-state conditions to the average chemical concentration measured in the water to which the organisms are exposed.

All terms were derived from Rand.

== Significance in regulatory context ==
In the United States, aquatic toxicology plays an important role in the NPDES wastewater permit program. While most wastewater dischargers typically conduct analytical chemistry testing for known pollutants, whole effluent toxicity tests have been standardized and are performed routinely as a tool for evaluating the potential harmful effects of other pollutants not specifically regulated in the discharge permits.

EPA's water quality program has published water quality criteria (for individual pollutants) and water quality standards (for water bodies) that were derived from aquatic toxicity tests.

=== Sediment quality guidelines ===
While sediment quality guidelines are not meant for regulation, they provide a way to rank and compare sediment quality developed by National Oceanic and Atmospheric Administration(NOAA). These sediment quality guidelines are summarized in NOAA's Screening Quick Reference Tables (SQuiRT) for many different chemicals.

== See also ==
- Biotic Ligand Model
- Clean Water Act (in the US)
- Ecotoxicology
- Cyanotoxin
- Freshwater biology
- Hydrobiology
- Marine pollution
- Oil pollution toxicity to marine fish
- Toxicology
- Poisonous fish
- Water management
- Water pollution
- Water purification
- Water quality
