= Biotic Ligand Model =

The Biotic Ligand Model (BLM) is a tool used in aquatic toxicology that examines the bioavailability of metals in the aquatic environment and the affinity of these metals to accumulate on gill surfaces of organisms. BLM depends on the site-specific water quality including such parameters as pH, hardness, and dissolved organic carbon. In this model, lethal accumulation values (accumulation of metal on the gill surface, in the case of fish, that cause mortality in 50% of the population) are used to be predictive of lethal concentration values that are more universal for aquatic toxicology and the development of standards. Collection of water chemistry parameters for a given site, incorporation of the data into the BLM computer model and analysis of the output data is used to accomplish BLM analysis. Comparison of these values derived from the model, have repeatedly been found to be comparable to the results of lethal tissue concentrations from acute toxicity tests. The BLM was developed from the gill surface interaction model (GSIM) and the free ion activity model (FIAM). Both of these models also address how metals interact with organisms and aquatic environments. Currently, the United States Environmental Protection Agency (EPA) uses the BLM as a tool to outline Ambient Water Quality Criteria (AWQC) for surface water. Because BLM is so useful for investigation of metals in surface water, there are developmental plans to expand BLM for use in marine and estuarine environments.

== History ==
Current knowledge of how specific water quality parameters alter the toxicity of metals to aquatic life is still growing.

In 1973, Zitko et al. provided evidence that the free metal ion played a stronger role in determining toxicity than did the metals overall concentration. Shortly after, in 1976, Zitko et al. established that Ca^{2+} and Mg^{2+} (hardness cations) were in competition with metal ions at the binding sites of the metals.

This competition at the binding site resulted in lower toxicity of metals as the hardness of the water they were in increased. Pagenkopf et al. used a chemical equilibrium model to explain how water chemistry will control which form of a metal is present and how that was related to the metal's toxicity. Both of these findings helped establish that metal toxicity and availability is directly related to the free ion activity of the metal.

This led to the development of what is now called the free-ion activity model (FIAM). The FIAM describes effects of metals based on metal speciation and their subsequent interactions with organisms. The free ion activity model was created to explain original observations about behaviors of metals in aquatic organisms and to examine the “universal importance of free metal ion activities in determining the uptake, nutrition and toxicity cationic trace metals”.

It is now known that aqueous concentrations of metals are poor predictors of the bioavailability of a particular metal. Further, as the biotic ligand model addresses, the binding of trace metal to a site is not only dependent on the concentration of the metal in question.

Parent et al. describe cell surface interactions according to the FIAM by saying that the biological response that is elicited is the result of the concentration of cell surface complexes, either metal or metal ligand. The original FIAM did not address other roles that ligands play besides complexing metals and how these other roles could affect the biological response of an organism.

Around the same time that the free ion activity model was proposed, the gill surface interaction model (GSIM) was introduced by Pagenkopf in 1983. The model was put into use in order to evaluate toxicity test results of metals as well as metals in mixtures.

Pagennkopf outlined that the compilation of previous studies on metals necessitated further examination of how metal toxicity changes as a function of pH, hardness and complexation capacity for the toxicity of metals to fishes.

In the gill surface interaction model both metal hardness and complexation are included. Pagenkopf lays out several major concepts that are the basis of the GSIM.

1. Trace metals alter gill function in fish (acutely) and the fish die as a result of respiratory failure.
2. Some trace metal species are significantly more toxic than others.
3. Gill surfaces can form complexes with the metal species and hydrogen ions that are present in the water.
4. Metal exchange between the gills and test waters are fast when compared to the time needed to perform a bioassay.
5. Gill surfaces have a determinate interaction capacity per unit weight.
6. Competitive inhibition occurs between the calcium and magnesium and the toxicants which include trace-metals and hydrogen ions .

Using these six concepts Pagenkopf looked at copper, zinc, cadmium, lead, combinations of metals, and hydrogen ion concentration using effective toxicant concentration. Per the results Pagenkopf assessed the applicability of the model and came up with several steps to using the GSIM. The required data are pH, alkalinity, hardness and total trace-metal content of a water sample. Once these parameters are obtained, the next step is to calculate the speciation of the metals in the water sample. Then look at the competitive interaction factor (CIF) and the effective toxicant concentration (ETC) of the metals—then effective toxicant concentration is compared to laboratory observations. The limitations of the FIAM and GSIM were important in the genesis of the BLM and both the FIAM and the GSIM led to the development of the biotic ligand model.

== Quantitative Information ==
The BLM is used to predict the lethal accumulation (LA50) of metals on the gill surface that results in mortality of 50% of the exposed individuals. Accumulation of metals on the gill surface is dependent on the specific area's water quality as the metal's bioavailability for binding with the ligand will be determined by what's in the water that the metal is likely to complex to other than the ligand on the gill surface of the fish. There are ten major inputs of water quality that the EPA recommends should be put into the Biotic Ligand Model to produce an estimation of the area's water quality. Two additional inputs (percent humic acid and sulfide) may also be used in some cases, though the EPA has cautioned against their extensive use due to their minimal effect and inconsistent reporting in scientific documents. Temperature of the water is one factor for consideration in the BLM, though it's been found to have a lesser effect than some of the other parameters. With respect to BLM, pH can have a large effect on the metal's ability to bind to the biotic ligand. Higher pH will decrease the metal's toxicity as the metal (in the case of copper) will complex more readily with carbonate and other organics that are dissolved in the water. With increasing pH, fewer protons are available to compete for a spot on the biotic ligand, so looking at this factor alone, it would seem that increasing pH would increase the metal's toxicity as it would have less competition for a binding site. However, the complexation effect that increasing pH has on the metal makes it less bioavailable for binding to the biotic ligand. Dissolved Organic Carbon (DOC) is another important factor among the BLM inputs. Increasing dissolved organic carbon decreases the metal's toxicity as the metal will bind with the dissolved organic carbon, making it less bioavailable for uptake by the biotic ligand. The major cations that have been found to have a significant impact on BLM are Ca^{2+}, Mg^{2+}, Na^{+} and K^{+}. Major anions, including SO_{4}^{−} and Cl^{−} also may be responsible for changing the metal's binding affinity for the biotic ligand. Alkalinity has a lesser effect on the BLM partitioning coefficients than do DOC and pH. Partitioning coefficients are used to determine the binding affinity of the metal to the biotic ligand. These coefficients are produced by the BLM following input from the above parameters.

== Limitations/Uncertainty ==
The Biotic Ligand model has several limitations and uncertainties. These uncertainties are important to address when utilizing the BLM for management of water resources. Water quality standards are based on total or dissolved metal concentrations. Water quality criteria are often derived using extrapolations from lab tests and data. Data is derived from lab tests using standardized laboratory methods and is generally not representative of the dynamic environmental conditions experienced in the field over a broad range of species.

== Types of Biotic Ligand Models ==
=== EPA's Biotic Ligand Model and Water Quality Criteria ===
Section 304(a)(1) of the Clean Water Act (CWA) requires that “the Administrator,” or Administrator of the United States Environmental Protection Agency, develop a water quality criteria that is based on current scientific information and judgment, data, contaminant concentrations, and the protection of human health and the environment. Water quality criteria are one of the goals of the EPA's Water Quality Standards (WQS) under the CWA. WQS are set by each state and determine the quality of specific water bodies based on its designated use, WQC, and anti-degradation policies. As of 2007 the EPA accepts use of BLM to help produce site specific freshwater WQC values for copper. The inputs for this model are: temperature, aquatic cations (Ca^{2+}, Mg^{2+}, Na^{+}, and K^{+}), aquatic anions (Cl^{−} and SO_{4}^{2−}), sulfide, pH, alkalinity, and DOC. The EPA has a working version of their BLM on their website.

=== HydroQual/Windward BLM ===
The BLM was originally developed by researchers at HydroQual Inc. The BLM software (up to version 2.2.3) was available at the HydroQual website for zinc, copper, lead, silver, and cadmium for aquatic freshwater systems only, although marine models were in the works. The HydroQual team also developed the BLM software distributed by US EPA. HydroQual was a privately owned science, research, and engineering company founded in 1980. In 2010, HydroQual was purchased by HDR Inc and the HydroQual website, including the BLM pages, have been retired. The research team at HydroQual that worked on the BLM have moved to Windward Environmental where a new BLM website is maintained.

=== Current and Future Studies ===
Currently, the EPA recognizes the use of the BLM in the identification and cleanup of copper. This is because of the extensive characterization and testing performed using copper to predict toxic outcomes of metal exposure in various environmental conditions (pH, DOC, temperature, etc.) . Another version of the BLM is underway by HydroQual who is in the processes of developing the TBLM with Copper and Nickel for predicting metal effects in soil. The future characterization of metals for the BLM like Ag, Zn, Pb, Al, Ni, and Cd on aquatic systems and organisms will help develop the BLM for a broader range of metals for which it can be certain to predict and assess potential impacts. The BLM is limited as it is only a predictive tool, but it has useful applications in aquatic toxicology.
