= Flow-through test =

Type of chemical test in which a water sample flows through a system

Flow-through tests or immunoconcentration assays are a type of diagnostic assay that allows users to test for the presence of a biomarker, usually a specific antibody, in a sample such as blood. They are a type of point of care test, designed to be used by a healthcare provider at patient contact. Point of care tests often allow for rapid detection of a specific biomarker without specialized lab equipment and training; this aids in diagnosis and allows therapeutic action to be initiated more quickly. Flow-through tests began development in the early 1980s and were the first type of immunostrip to be developed, although lateral flow tests have subsequently become the dominant immunostrip point of care device.

== History ==
The first flow-through test was developed in 1985 to test for the presence of beta-human chorionic gonadotropin in urine.

== Principle of flow-through tests ==
Flow-through assays are by principle binding assays. In practice, they are mostly applied to detect the interaction of an antibody, as from a sample of the test subject's blood, with immobilized antigens, resulting in the formation of an antigen-antibody complex. However, other types of capture-assays are technically feasible, including small molecule capture-assays or antigen tests. Flow-through assays for the detection of mycotoxins, based on ELISA, have been available since the 1980s and can be used in field analyses.

Flow-through tests typically come in the form of cassettes divided into four parts: an upper casing, a reactive membrane panel, an absorbent panel, and a lower casing. To perform a test, a diluted sample is applied to the reactive membrane panel and flows through to the absorbent pad, with the target analyte being captured in the membrane. The membrane is then washed to remove unbound, non-target molecules, washed again with a solution containing a signal reagent, and washed again to remove unbound signal reagent. If the analyte was present in the original sample, then by the end of this process it should be bound to the membrane, with the signal reagent bound to it, revealing (usually visually) the presence of the analyte on the membrane.

== Advantages and disadvantages ==
Flow-through tests can be performed more quickly than lateral flow tests. They exhibit good sensitivity to antibodies, but their detection of antigens is generally less sensitive than lateral flow tests.
