= Olfactory toxicity in fish =

The olfactory system is the system related to the sense of smell (olfaction). Many fish activities are dependent on olfaction, such as: mating, discriminating kin, avoiding predators, locating food, contaminant avoidance, imprinting and homing. These activities are referred to as "olfactory-mediated". Impairment of the olfactory system threatens survival and has been used as an ecologically relevant sub-lethal toxicological endpoint for fish within studies. Olfactory information is received by sensory neurons, like the olfactory nerve, that are in a covered cavity separated from the aquatic environment by mucus. Since they are in almost direct contact with the surrounding environment, these neurons are vulnerable to environmental changes. Fish can detect natural chemical cues in aquatic environments at concentrations as low as parts per billion (ppb) or parts per trillion (ppt).

Studies have shown that exposures to metals, pesticides, or surfactants can disrupt fish olfaction, which can impact their survival and reproductive success. Many studies have indicated copper as a source of olfactory toxicity in fishes, among other common substances. Olfactory toxicity can occur by multiple, complex Modes of Toxic Action.

== History ==
Early investigation by Hasler and Wisby (1951) examined how fish use olfactory imprinting to discriminate smells in order for fish to find their natal streams. This research provided the framework for testing synthetic chemicals used by hatcheries to examine homing and straying by hatchery fish.
The investigation of the toxicity of mercury and copper to the olfactory systems in fish began in the early 1970s. Where they found that solutions of mercury chloride (HgCl_{2}) and copper sulfate (CuSO_{4}) depressed olfactory response during exposure to the two toxicants and found that toxicant concentration and olfactory response had an inverse relationship to each other.

== Olfactory system ==
Olfaction begins with an interaction between an odorant molecule and an olfactory sensory neuron (OSN) located within the epithelium of the Glomerulus bulb. Odorants bind to receptor proteins that are held within individual OSNs. Not all fish have the same types or number of receptor proteins making olfactory toxicity and the subsequent effects species specific. There are three types of OSN cells: (1) ciliated cells, microvillus cells, and crypt cells. These cells are distributed across the olfactory epithelium (OE), OSNs that express common binding receptor proteins are connected to the olfactory bulb (OB) by axons.

The changes in olfactory function can be placed into three categories: (1) anosmia, the inability to smell; (2) hyposmia, a reduced ability to smell; or (3) dysosmia, where olfactory signals are incorrectly processed. Most chemicals at lower concentrations cause a degree of hyposmia while at higher concentrations anosmia is the result. Dysomia is less commonly observed, however, cases of fish becoming attracted to metal-contaminated waters have been studied and examined.

== Metals ==
Metals are a necessary and important trace element that most organisms need to function properly. They are often used as coenzymes or interact with biological enzymes to form complexes inside organisms. However, if the metals in question are in too high of concentrations it can be fatal. Different parameters such as pH, alkalinity, temperature, fish size, or salinity can alter how the metals interact or are metabolized by the organism. Fish are oftentimes less tolerant to metals than terrestrial animals are. Their gills are sensitive to changes in their environment and highly susceptible to metal toxicity. Before a metal may have toxic effects it can also cause a change in olfactory response, or other responses, within fish. If the exposure is short in length or low in concentration the effects can be reversed, but at high enough concentrations it becomes toxic to the organism leading to death. Copper, cadmium, lead, and zinc are common metals that cause olfactory toxicity in fish.

Copper is a metal looked at in more detail than others. This is because it is commonly used in fish hatcheries as an algaecide as it is an effective way to prevent parasitic and fungal infections within fish populations at hatcheries. It can also be released from industrial or agricultural sources. Either applied in a chemical spray or deposit, or used within copper netting on the outside of aquaculture, copper kills algae and bacteria that can cause fish to become sick. However, it does induce olfactory toxicity at relevant concentrations to aquaculture.

=== Mechanism of action ===
Metals mechanism of action has been hypothesized to inhibit the electrical properties of olfactory neurons by blocking ligand-gated or voltage-gated ion channels in the nervous system of fish. However, direct mechanisms of action for metals are not fully understood and still need to be researched further.

=== Past studies ===
==== Copper ====
A 2006 study from Japan focused on olfactory inhibition in chum salmon and their ability to recover from copper toxicity after being exposed to relevant copper concentrations that are often used on hatchery fishes. The fish were exposed to the relevant concentrations for four hours while using an electro-olfactogram (EOG). Results showed that copper toxicity both depended on exposure concentration and time. A combination of these parameters, as well as other parameters, can change the degree of impact on target sites as well as if the toxic effects are reversible or not. Under short-term, four-hour exposures the chum salmon recovered from the toxic effects after one day. In hatchery fish this short-term effect will likely not cause harm, but in wild fish this olfactory disruption may impair important survival instincts and strategies. Based on current research a specific mechanism of action for copper toxicity has not been identified and more research is needed.

Another study investigated morphological changes in olfactory mucosa of Tilapia mariae when exposed to low levels of the copper toxicant. The fish were exposed to 20, 40 and 100 μg/L copper for four days, then allowed to recover in untreated water and were monitored during recovery. After ten full days of recovery all sample tissues tested showed no significant difference between that and the control group. This suggests that at low levels the copper damage done to the olfactory system is reversible and tissue integrity can be restored.

A third study wanted to compare hatchery raised fish tolerance to copper versus naturally reared fish to see if there is a plausible difference between the two species and their tolerance to copper levels in their system. They exposed naturally reared steelhead (Oncorhynchus mykiss) to 5 and 20 μg/L for 3 hours. Based on their EOG readings the olfactory function was depressed and the steelhead showed a disruption of olfactory response to the amino acid L-serine in a dose-dependent manner. Their data was consistent with previous studies that expose hatchery-raised fish species to copper. This means that there is no significant difference or level of tolerance between naturally reared or hatchery-reared fish for copper tolerances.

==== Cadmium ====
Williams and Gallager from the University of Washington studied effects of cadmium on olfactory mediated behaviors and biomarkers in coho salmon (Oncorhynchus kisutch) over the course of a 48-hour exposure time and 16-day depuration. Coho exposed to 347 ppb Cd (high range dose) over the 48 hours expressed high levels of olfactory inhibition, behavioral deficits, histological injury and altered expression of olfactory biomarkers. After the 16-day cleansing period to allow the salmon to recover the behavior deficits, histological injuries, and altered expressions were still evident. Coho exposed to 3.7 ppb Cd (low range dose) still exhibited the same responses, just less severe in effects. After the 16-day depuration period adverse behavioral effects were still apparent in the low dose organisms.

=== Impacts ===
Just like other metals in aquatic systems in low enough exposures the toxic effects on fish populations can be reversed with removal of the contaminants from the ecosystem. If exposure is too high or for prolonged durations irreversible cell damage can occur which eventually leads to cell death. Olfactory toxicity due to metals cause a general depression of the olfactory system leading to decreased sense of smell, loss of homing sense to natal streams, loss of ability to choose a preferred mate, and trouble locating food.

== Pesticides ==
Pesticides are useful tools in modern society. Depending on the chemical and how lipophilic, or fat-loving, they are they can move in and out of organisms at different rates. Pesticides are another group of toxicants that can cause olfactory disruption in fish.

=== Mechanism of action ===
Dissolved neurotoxins may: 1) compete with natural odorants for binding sites on olfactory neuron receptor proteins 2) change the activation properties of these receptors 3) move to the cytosol of the sensory neuron where the modify intracellular signaling.
Pesticides that act as acetylcholinesterase inhibiting neurotoxins are known to reduce the responsiveness of olfactory sensory neurons to natural stimuli. The effects of these pesticides on the olfactory system is thought to be related to inhibition of acetylcholinesterase, but the role of acetylcholinesterase in the olfactory system is unknown. Pesticides also are known to affect other enzymes in the olfactory system.

The specific mechanisms are unknown, but there is evidence that pesticides and metals have different targets in the olfactory epithelium.

=== Past studies ===
Studies on pesticides and olfaction in fishes have looked at neurophysiological effects, behavioral effects, and reproductive effects.
Organophosphate and carbamate insecticides are neurotoxins that cause acetylcholinesterase inhibition in fish. Acetyl cholinesterase-inhibiting insecticides are known to cause hyposmia. Acetylcholinesterase plays an essential role within the olfactory epithelium related to mucus production. Diazinon, an organophosphate, was found to disrupt olfactory pheromone signals that induced antipredator behavior, such as predator avoidance. It also disrupts homing behavior in Chinook salmon at environmentally-relevant concentrations. Fewer diazinon-treated chinook returned to the hatchery than control fish. Studies have found that olfactory sensory neurons do not respond to certain pesticides. Fish did not detect chlorpyrifos, esfenvalerate, and atrazine using their sense of smell and did not avoid waters contaminated with these chemicals. This contrasts metals, which elicits an avoidance response in fish. Round-up was only avoided at concentrations that caused acute lethality.
Ovulating female salmon release a pheromone in their urine. After detection by the olfactory system of mature male salmon parr, plasma sex steroids and milt increase. A synthetic pyrethroid pesticide, cypermethrin, reduced or inhibited normal olfactory system response in males to the priming effect of these pheromones. Atrazine, carbofuran and diazinon were also found to reduce olfactory detection of female priming pheromones by male Atlantic salmon parr.

=== Impacts ===
- Behavioral effects

Chinook salmon previously exposed to diazinon continued to be active and feed in the presence of an alarm stimulus that represented a potential predator. Normal anti-predator behavior exhibited by controls included freezing, reduced food capture, and movement to lower areas of the water column. Diazinon-exposed salmon parr would be at higher risk to predation.

- Reproduction

Reduced production of milt and plasma sex hormones in males due to the inability to detect the female salmon priming pheromones.

- Population

Survival and reproductive success of Pacific Northwest salmon may be lower in streams contaminated with neurotoxic pesticides such as diazinon. These chemicals are most common in urban and agricultural watersheds, thus salmon populations in these areas may be affected. Delayed spawning in bluegill exposed to a pyrethroid was thought to be a result of disruption to the synchronization of spawning between the sexes signaled by pheromones. Delayed spawning readiness in males has the potential to impact reproduction in populations. The effect of pesticides on homing ability may increase straying, in which fish do not return to their natal streams to spawn, can lead to colonizing new habitats, but it can also diminish genetic integrity or the number of spawning animals of the original stream.

== Surfactants ==
=== Mechanism of action ===
Sodium lauryl sulfate (SLS) is an anionic detergent that has more than one probable mode of action. The interaction of SLS with mucus, proteins, and membranes result in multiple possible modes of action. The depression in olfactory sense (hyposmia) at low concentrations caused by interaction with mucus is most often a result of the disruption of mucus layers of the olfactory bulb causing avoidance behavior in rainbow trout (Oncorhynchus mykiss). Additionally, SLS can reversibly and irreversibly alter protein structure because they act to solubilize the lipid bilayer of membranes and denature proteins. This can lead to decreased enzyme activity, changes in permeability and altered transport characteristics of membranes.

=== Past studies ===
Few studies have examined the effects of surfactants, adjuvants, and emulsifiers on fish olfaction. Neurological indicators of olfactory toxicity indicate that the surfactant sodium lauryl sulfonate (SLS) at 0.5 mg/L depressed L-serine and evoked responses in lake white fish (Coregonus clupeaformis) by 50%.

=== Impacts ===
- Behavior

Avoidance behavior exhibited by fish is species specific, Whitefish (C. clupeaformis) showed a preference toward SLS at a concentration of 0.1 mg/L while rainbow trout (Oncorhynchus mykiss) and common carp (Cyprinus carpio) showed an avoidance response at a concentration of 0.01 ug/L. Past studies are difficult to compare due to differences in test and exposure conditions.

== Implications ==
The disruption of olfaction and potential effects to survival and reproductive success at environmentally-relevant concentrations metals, pesticides or surfactants have implications for fish and salmon recovery because these are commonly found in western United States streams. Conventional, acute and chronic toxicity testing do not explicitly address nervous system function and underestimate thresholds for toxicity in salmonids. Since these effects are not explicitly looked at during studies they oftentimes can go unnoticed.
Olfactory toxicity occurring at environmentally relevant concentrations can induce reduction to food odor attraction and predator scent or alarm response pheromones can cause major problems with survivorship. Olfactory toxicity can also affect the ability of anadromous fish to find their natal stream causing them to stray to other streams.

== See also ==
- Olfaction
- Aquatic toxicology
- Clean Water Act (in the US)
- Fish acute toxicity syndrome
- Stream ecology
- Pre-spawn mortality in coho salmon
