= Modes of toxic action =

Types of adverse biological response

A mode of toxic action is a common set of physiological and behavioral signs that characterize a type of adverse biological response. A mode of action should not be confused with mechanism of action, which refer to the biochemical processes underlying a given mode of action. Modes of toxic action are important, widely used tools in ecotoxicology and aquatic toxicology because they classify toxicants or pollutants according to their type of toxic action. There are two major types of modes of toxic action: non-specific acting toxicants and specific acting toxicants. Non-specific acting toxicants are those that produce narcosis, while specific acting toxicants are those that are non-narcotic and that produce a specific action at a specific target site.

== Types ==
=== Non-specific ===
Non-specific acting modes of toxic action result in narcosis; therefore, narcosis is a mode of toxic action. Narcosis is defined as a generalized depression in biological activity due to the presence of toxicant molecules in the organism. The target site and mechanism of toxic action through which narcosis affects organisms are still unclear, but there are hypotheses that support that it occurs through alterations in the cell membranes at specific sites of the membranes, such as the lipid layers or the proteins bound to the membranes. Even though continuous exposure to a narcotic toxicant can produce death, if the exposure to the toxicant is stopped, narcosis can be reversible.

=== Specific ===
Toxicants that at low concentrations modify or inhibit some biological process by binding at a specific site or molecule have a specific acting mode of toxic action. However, at high enough concentrations, toxicants with specific acting modes of toxic actions can produce narcosis that may or may not be reversible. Nevertheless, the specific action of the toxicant is always shown first because it requires lower concentrations.

There are several specific acting modes of toxic action:

- Uncouplers of oxidative phosphorylation. Involves toxicants that uncouple the two processes that occur in oxidative phosphorylation: electron transfer and adenosine triphosphate (ATP) production.
- Acetylcholinesterase (AChE) inhibitors. AChE is an enzyme associated with nerve synapses that it's designed to regulate nerve impulses by breaking down the neurotransmitter Acetylcholine (ACh). When toxicants bind to AChE, they inhibit the breakdown of ACh. This results in continued nerve impulses across the synapses, which eventually cause nerve system damage. Examples of AChE inhibitors are organophosphates and carbamates, which are components found in pesticides (see Acetylcholinesterase inhibitors).
- Irritants. These are chemicals that cause an inflammatory effect on living tissue by chemical action at the site of contact. The resulting effect of irritants is an increase in the volume of cells due to a change in size (hypertrophy) or an increase in the number of cells (hyperplasia). Examples of irritants are benzaldehyde, acrolein, zinc sulphate and chlorine.
- Central nervous system (CNS) seizure agents. CNS seizure agents inhibit cellular signaling by acting as receptor antagonists. They result in the inhibition of biological responses. Examples of CNS seizure agents are organochlorine pesticides.
- Respiratory blockers. These are toxicants that affect respiration by interfering with the electron transport chain in the mitochondria. Examples of respiratory blockers are rotenone and cyanide.

== Determination ==
The pioneer work of identifying the major categories of modes of toxic action (see description above) was conducted by investigators from the U.S. Environmental Protection Agency (EPA) at the Duluth Laboratory using fish, reason why they named the categories as Fish Acute Toxicity Syndromes (FATS). They proposed the FATS by assessing the behavioral and physiological responses of the fish when subjected to toxicity tests, such as locomotive activities, body color, ventilation patterns, cough rate, heart rate, and others.

It has been proposed that modes of toxic action could be estimated by developing a data set of critical body residues (CBR). The CBR is the whole-body concentration of a chemical that is associated with a given adverse biological response and it is estimated using a partition coefficient and a bioconcentration factor. The whole-body residues are reasonable first approximations of the amount of chemical present at the toxic action site(s). Because different modes of toxic action generally appear to be associated with different ranges of body residues, modes of toxic action can then be separated into categories. However, it is unlikely that every chemical has the same mode of toxic action in every organism, so this variability should be considered. The effects of mixture toxicity should be considered as well, even though mixture toxicity it's generally additive, chemicals with more than one mode of toxic action may contribute to toxicity.

Modeling has become a common used tool to predict modes of toxic action in the last decade. The models are based in Quantitative Structure-Activity Relationships (QSARs), which are mathematical models that relate the biological activity of molecules to their chemical structures and corresponding chemical and physicochemical properties. QSARs can then predict modes of toxic action of unknown compounds by comparing its characteristic toxicity profile and chemical structure to reference compounds with known toxicity profiles and chemical structures. Russom and colleagues were one of the first group of researchers being able to classify modes of toxic action with the use of QSARs; they classified 600 chemicals as narcotics. Even though QSARs are a useful tool for predicting modes of toxic action, chemicals having multiple modes of toxic action can obscure QSAR analyses. Therefore, these models are continuously being developed.

== Applications ==
=== Environmental risk assessment ===
The objective of environmental risk assessment is to protect the environment from adverse effects. Researchers are further developing QSAR models with the ultimate goal providing a clear insight about a mode of toxic action, but also about what the actual target site is, the concentration of the chemical at this target site, and the interaction occurring at the target site, as well as to predict the modes of toxic action in mixtures. Information on the mode of toxic action is crucial not only in understanding joint toxic effects and potential interactions between chemicals in mixtures, but also for developing assays for the evaluation of complex mixtures in the field.

=== Regulation ===
The combination of behavioral and physiological responses, CBR estimates, and chemical fate and bioaccumulation QSAR models can be a powerful regulatory tool to address pollution and toxicity in areas where effluents are discharged.
