= Inbreeding in fish =

Mating of closely related individuals in fish

Inbreeding in fish is the mating of closely related individuals, leading to an increase in homozygosity. Repeated inbreeding generally leads to morphological abnormalities and a reduction in fitness in the offspring. In the wild, fish have a number of ways to avoid inbreeding, both before and after spawning.

== Exposure ==
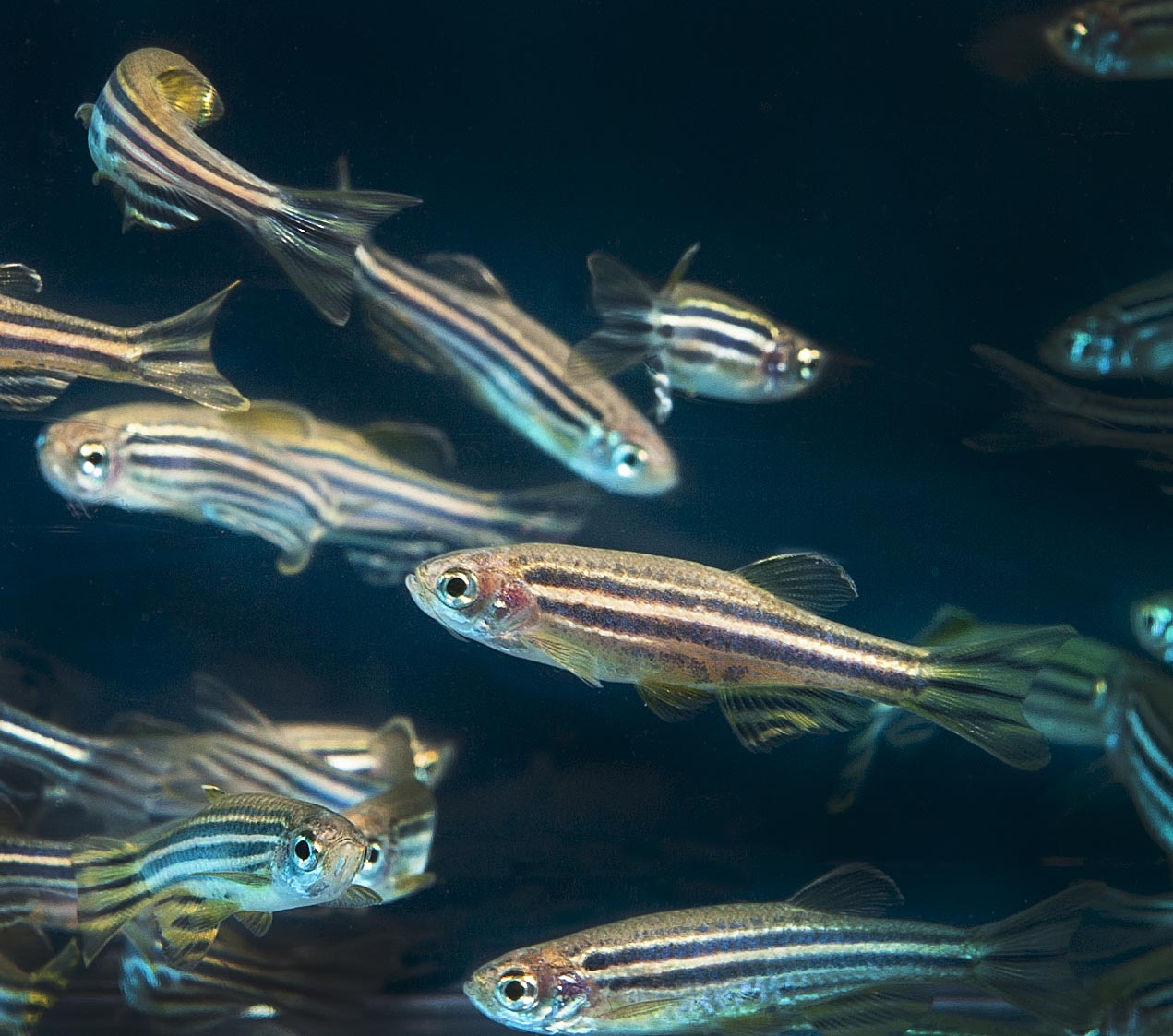
Zebrafish being used for research at Oregon State University

Exposure of zebrafish to a chemical environmental agent, analogous to that caused by anthropogenic pollution, amplified the effects of inbreeding on key reproductive traits. Embryo viability was significantly reduced in inbred exposed fish and there was a tendency for inbred males to sire fewer offspring.

== Effects ==
The effect of inbreeding on reproductive behavior was studied in the poeciliid fish Heterandria formosa. One generation of full-sib mating was found to decrease reproductive performance and likely reproductive success of male progeny. Other traits that displayed inbreeding depression were offspring viability and maturation time of both males and females.

== Behaviors ==
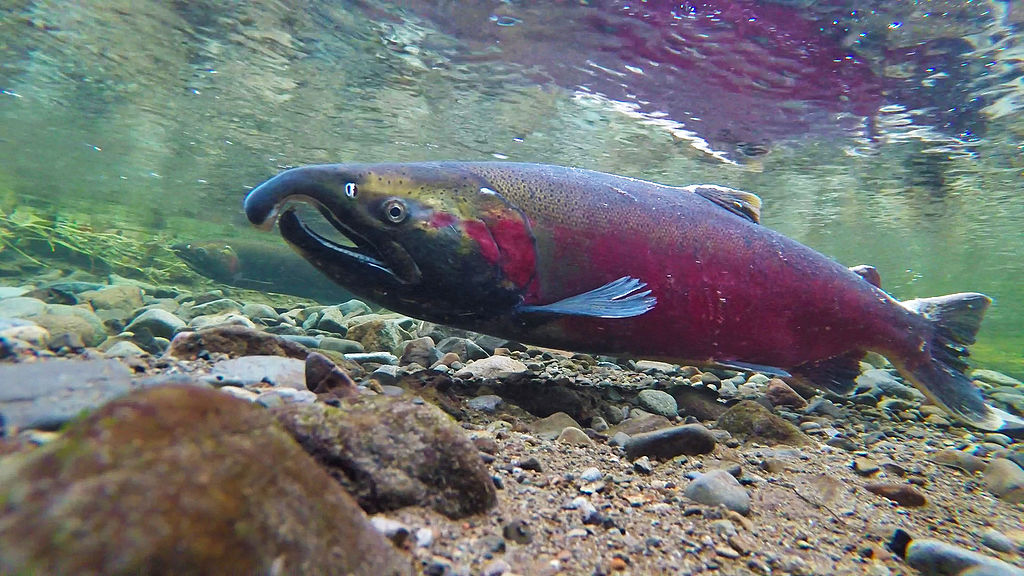
Coho salmon photographed at Bureau of Land Management of Oregon and Washington

The behaviors of juvenile Coho salmon with either low or medium inbreeding were compared in paired contests. Fish with low inbreeding showed almost twice the aggressive pursuit in defending territory than fish with medium inbreeding, and furthermore had a higher specific growth rate. A significant effect of inbreeding depression on juvenile survival was also found, but only in high-density competitive environments, suggesting that intra-specific competition can magnify the deleterious effects of inbreeding.

== Inbreeding avoidance mechanisms ==
Inbreeding ordinarily has negative fitness consequences (inbreeding depression), and as a result species have evolved mechanisms to avoid inbreeding. Numerous inbreeding avoidance mechanisms operating before mating have been described. However, inbreeding avoidance mechanisms that operate after copulation are less well known. In guppies, a post-copulatory mechanism of inbreeding avoidance occurs based on competition between sperm of rival males for achieving fertilization. In competitions between sperm from an unrelated male and from a full sibling male, a significant bias in paternity towards the unrelated male was observed. It is a theory that females avoid inbreeding more than males due to the fact that when they mate with a sibling, they obtain 50% less sperm in their ovarian cavities in comparison to mating with a nonsibling.

== Inbreeding depression ==
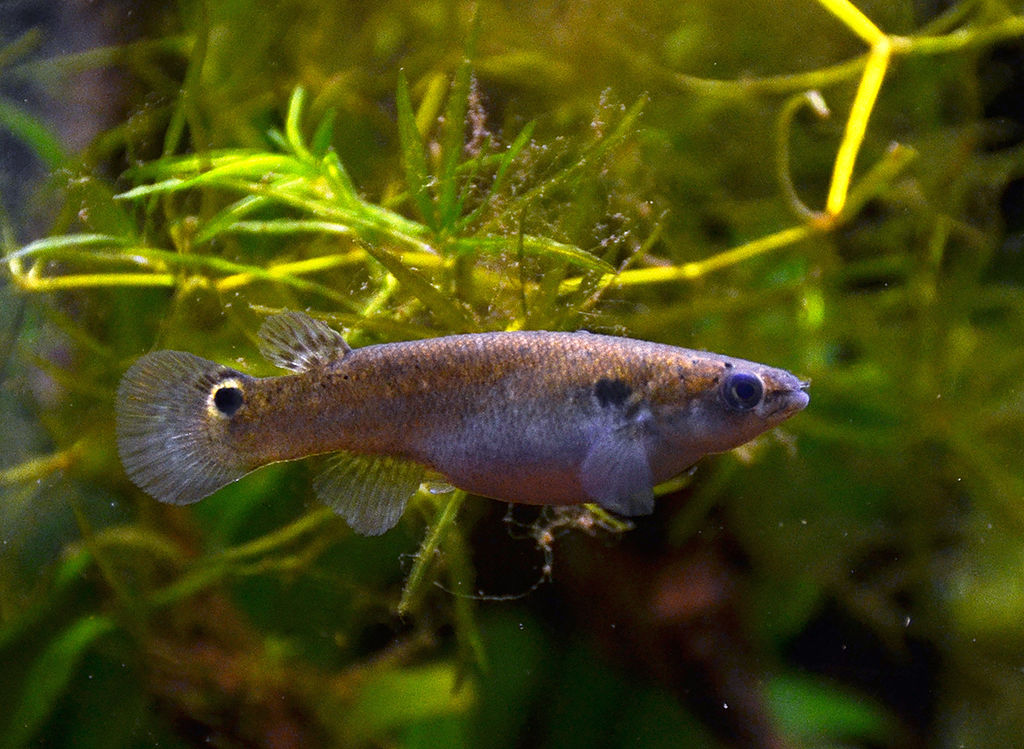
A Mangrove Killifish in the aquarium tropical du Palais de la Porte Dorée, in Paris

Inbreeding depression is considered to be due largely to the expression of homozygous deleterious recessive mutations. This is the consequence of mating between related parents, causing a decrease in fitness in the offspring. Outcrossing between unrelated individuals results in the beneficial masking of deleterious recessive mutations in progeny.

The mangrove rivulus Kryptolebias marmoratus produces eggs and sperm by meiosis and routinely reproduces by self-fertilization. Each individual hermaphrodite normally fertilizes itself when an egg and sperm that it has produced by an internal organ unite inside the fish's body. In nature, this mode of reproduction can yield highly homozygous lines composed of individuals so genetically uniform as to be, in effect, identical to one another. The capacity for selfing in these fishes has apparently persisted for at least several hundred thousand years.

== Fertilization assurance ==
Although inbreeding, especially in the extreme form of self-fertilization, is ordinarily regarded as detrimental because it leads to expression of deleterious recessive alleles, self-fertilization does provide the benefit of “fertilization assurance” (reproductive assurance) at each generation.
