= Fish acute toxicity syndrome =

- Specialty: Veterinary medicine

Fish acute toxicity syndrome (FATS) is a set of common chemical and functional responses in fish resulting from a short-term, acute exposure to a lethal concentration of a toxicant, a chemical or material that can produce an unfavorable effect in a living organism. By definition, modes of action are characterized by FATS because the combination of common responses that represent each fish acute toxicity syndrome characterize an adverse biological effect. Therefore, toxicants that have the same mode of action elicit similar sets of responses in the organism and can be classified by the same fish acute toxicity syndrome.

== Background ==
During the 1970s, large-scale production of chemicals dramatically increased initiating new legislation to appease public concern about potential harmful effects. After implementation of the Toxic Substances Control Act in 1977, the US Environmental Protection Agency (USEPA) required chemicals, new and existing, to be assessed for risks to human health and ecological systems. Since thousands of new chemicals are registered a year, it is important to utilize a screening technique that predicts toxicity of chemicals in a consistent, efficient manner. As a result, researchers in the field of toxicology focused on the development of QSAR models as a means of assessing toxic effects of chemicals in fish.

In toxicology, the quantitative structure-activity relationship (QSAR) approach is a method for predicting toxicity based on the properties and structure of a toxicant. This method has been developed under the assumption that a group of chemicals, with similar structural components, will result in similar toxic effects due to having the same activity, or mode of action. In other words, the toxicity of a chemical is directly related to the chemical's structure. Therefore, QSAR are used to create predictive computer programs and models to correlate structure and activity of chemicals. Overall, the objective is to aid in toxicology by providing databases and predictive models for classifying toxicants by modes of action as well as estimate acute toxicity of a chemical. To utilize the QSAR approach, researchers need to establish a pool of variables to be considered in this modelling process. QSAR models are differentiated by groups of chemicals characterized by a common mode of action. However, limited data is available on defined relationships between toxic responses and chemicals with known modes of action. Consequently, toxicologists have focused on the development of FATS to define these responses to better predict modes of action. This approach focuses on grouping chemical and functional responses in a manner so that individual chemicals with known modes of action can be separated into specific FATS. Overall, FATS aid QSAR models by providing a systematic way of defining and predicting modes of action.

== Determination ==
In 1987, McKim and colleagues began a series of experiments to characterize FATS. These experiments involved whole-fish in vivo analyses. The animals used in these experiments were Rainbow trout (Oncorhynchus mykiss formerly known as Salmo gairdneri). The fish underwent surgery prior to the exposure to implant respiratory and cardiovascular monitoring devices, and immobilize them. During the experiment, the fish were kept in a Plexiglas respiratory-metabolism chamber, which was filled with Lake Superior water. Water temperature was maintained for the duration of the experiments, and other water quality parameters (pH, total hardness, alkalinity, and acidity) were recorded once.

The toxicants used in these experiments were chosen because they had a known mode of action. The only exception to this was the narcotics. McKim et al. and Bradbury et al. used compounds known to be narcotics, and with a discriminant function analysis Bradbury et al. and colleagues identified two separate narcosis syndromes, I and II, which correspond to nonpolar and polar narcotics, respectively. By using compounds with known modes of action, these scientists could develop sets of respiratory-cardiovascular responses unique to a particular mode of action.

In the first experiment, two narcotics, tricaine methanesulfonate and 1-octanol, and two uncouplers of oxidative phosphorylation, pentachlorophenol and 2,4-dinitrophenol, were used. During the second experiment, acetylcholinesterase inhibitors and respiratory irritants were evaluated. The acetylcholinesterase inhibitors were an organophosphate, Malathion and a carbamate, Carbaryl. The respiratory irritants were Acrolein and Benzaldehyde. In part three of the experiment series, polar narcotics phenol, 2,4-dimethylphenol, aniline, 2-chloroaniline and 4-chloroaniline were evaluated. In the last experiment, central nervous system seizure agents were analyzed. These included an acetylcholinesterase inhibitor, Chlorpyrifos; two pyrethroid insecticides, Fenvalerate and Cypermethrin; two cyclodiene insecticides, Endrin and Endosulfan; and a rodenticide, Strychnine. The duration of the exposure depended on the experiment, but the range was from 24 to 48 hours. Therefore, exposure resulted in acute toxicity. The Rainbow trout were exposed to a 24- to 48-hour lethal concentration of the toxicant. The respiratory and cardiovascular responses monitored throughout the exposure were cough rate, ventilation rate, ventilation volume, total oxygen consumption, oxygen utilization, heart rate, arterial blood pressure, arterial blood oxygen, arterial blood carbon dioxide, arterial blood pH, hematocrit, hemoglobin, electrocardiogram, plasma ions (calcium, magnesium, potassium, sodium, and chloride), and osmolality. Pre-dose values were obtained prior to the exposure. The responses were measured at two-hour intervals throughout the exposure, except for blood parameters, which were measured every four to eight hours, and blood ions, which were measured just before death.

Using the results of the experiment, each toxicant was then characterized by a set of respiratory-cardiovascular responses. Statistical analyses were used to determine significant differences in responses between toxicants with different modes of action. Finally, because each toxicant had a known mode of action, the set of responses characterized the mode of action.

== Types ==
=== Nonspecific ===
==== Narcosis ====
- Narcosis Narcosis refers to the general depression of biological activity from exposure to a nonspecifically acting toxicant. Toxicants that induce narcosis are known as narcotics or anesthetics. Alcohol is an example of a narcotic and can result in intoxication, a form of narcosis. Using the FATS approach, researchers are able to predict toxicity by assessing responses elicited by narcotics.

Narcotics are a diverse group of chemicals including: inert gases, aliphatic and aromatic hydrocarbons, chlorinated hydrocarbons, alcohols, ethers, ketones, aldehydes, weak acids and bases, and aliphatic nitro compounds. Although narcosis can be induced by a wide range of chemical agents, there are a few chemicals that are not considered narcotics. This includes chemicals that: form irreversible bonds by electrophilic reaction; are metabolically activated by electrophiles; form Schiff bases with amino groups; and any type of a Michael acceptor. In general, narcotics are non-reactive.

Many organic chemicals in high enough concentrations induce narcotic symptoms. Thus, most toxicants can be considered narcotics. Baseline toxicity, or lowest toxicity is often used to refer to narcosis because this mode of action is considered the minimal effect. QSAR models are often used to predict minimum or baseline toxicity of chemicals acting through nonspecific mechanisms.

==== Mechanisms of action ====
Narcosis is a reversible state that is considered nonspecific because a single mechanism of action has yet to be established. Although the mechanisms of narcosis remain unclear, current theories suggest that narcosis is associated with altered structure and function of cell membranes. The Critical-Volume Hypothesis theorizes that symptoms of narcosis are due to the toxicant dissolving in the lipid component of a cell membrane. This results in an increased volume of cell membranes and consequently, altered membrane structure and function. The Protein Binding Theory suggests that a narcotic binds to receptors on the hydrophobic region of cellular membrane proteins. In both theories, the cell membranes are targeted by narcotics resulting in decreased functionality, narcosis.

==== Symptoms ====
General responses to narcotics include: lethargy, unconsciousness, and overall depression in respiratory-cardiovascular activity. Narcosis can result in death by nonspecific, sustained symptoms. In the final phases of narcosis, McKim and colleagues observed tissue hypoxia, generalized loss of respiratory-cardiovascular function and ultimately, respiratory paralysis. For example, rainbow trout exposed to two narcotics, MS-222 and 1-octanol exhibited a variety of respiratory-cardiovascular responses. The narcotic symptoms included: loss of reaction to external stimuli, loss of equilibrium, decline in respiratory rate and medullary collapse.

==== Narcosis I and narcosis II ====
Studies have suggested that two distinct modes of action exist for narcosis: narcosis I and narcosis II. Narcosis I is induced by nonpolar compounds while narcosis II relates to polar compounds. If polar and nonpolar narcotics induced the same effects, baseline-narcosis models should be able to accurately predict toxicity for both groups of chemicals. However, polar compounds have exhibited greater toxicity than predicted by baseline toxicity models. This difference in toxicity between nonpolar and polar narcotics supports the theory that two separate mechanisms of action exist for the different modes of narcosis.

Based on the QSAR approach, differences in the chemical structure can be used to predict the activity of toxicants. The polarity of toxicants can be used to differentiate narcotic modes of action into the two groups: narcosis I and narcosis II. In narcosis I, nonpolar chemicals induced generalized depression of respiratory-cardiovascular responses. I narcosis II, polar chemicals first result in increased activity. The unique response of narcosis II is supported by research conducted on rainbow trout. When exposed to polar narcotics, rainbow trout first exhibited increased muscular activity followed by incoordination and unresponsiveness to external stimuli.

In general, narcosis II is characterized by greater toxicity than narcosis I. Thus, Baseline-narcosis models should be used for predicting the toxicity of nonpolar narcotics. In addition, narcosis I is the generalized depression of biological activity. In contrast, narcosis II symptoms include stimulation of respiratory-cardiovascular responses followed by generalized depression of activity.

=== Specific ===
- Uncouplers of oxidative phosphorylation*AChE inhibitors
- Irritants
- CNS seizure agents
- Respiratory blockers*Dioxins

A toxicant which exhibits a specific mode of action binds to a site on a particular biological molecule thereby altering or inhibiting a biological process. In comparison, a toxicant that exhibits non-specific action, also referred to as a narcotic, simply depresses biological activity by unknown means. Scientists are still unsure what site(s) a narcotic binds to, and the biochemical responses that result. Specific action is unique in comparison to non-specific in that relatively lower amounts of toxicant are needed to elicit a response. Because lower concentrations of toxicant are need to elicit a response, specific modes of action are usually seen before non-specific modes of action. Ultimately, with high enough concentrations though, most toxicants are narcotic (demonstrate non-specific modes of action).

There are a variety of specific-action FATS which have been studied and documented. These include acetylcholinesterase (AChE) inhibitors, respiratory irritants, respiratory blockers, dioxins, central nervous system seizure agents, and uncouplers of oxidative phosphorylation. Acetylcholinesterase, an enzyme which degrades acetylcholine an important neurotransmitter, has been demonstrated to be inhibited by particular toxicants like organophosphates and carbamates. Respiratory irritants bind to respiratory tissue membranes, which are the first tissue membranes available for exposure. Respiratory blockers are known to affect the electron transport chain in the mitochondria of cells. Central Nervous System seizure agents are associated with effects such as partial or whole body seizures and coughing. Dioxin is recognized as having a different mode of action than the others, but has not been studied by the FATS method.

==== Uncouplers of oxidative phosphorylation ====
Uncouplers of oxidative phosphorylation are specifically acting toxicants. Oxidative phosphorylation is a coupling reaction in which ATP is synthesized from phosphate groups using energy obtained from the oxidation-reduction reactions in the mitochondrial electron transport chain. ATP production is very important because it is essentially the energy currency in biological systems. Under normal circumstances, oxidation-reduction reactions in the mitochondrial electron transport chain produce energy. This energy is used to shuttle protons across the inner mitochondrial membrane, from the mitochondrial matrix into the inner membrane space. This creates a pH gradient where conditions are acidic (i.e. higher concentrations of protons) in the inner membrane space, and more basic (i.e. low concentrations of protons) in the mitochondrial matrix. Due to this gradient, protons pass through ATPase, a protein embedded in the inner mitochondrial membrane, down their concentration gradient, into the mitochondrial matrix driving the production of ATP.

Uncouplers of oxidative phosphorylation disrupt the production of ATP. They do so by binding to the protons in the inner membrane space, and shuttling them into the mitochondrial matrix Therefore, the chemical gradient which drives ATP synthesis is broken down and energy production slows. Oxygen consumption increases to counteract the effects of low ATP production. Also, lactic acid concentrations increase as tissues are switching to anaerobic metabolism which poisons the mitochondria.

Cardiovascular-respiratory responses associated with exposure to uncouplers of oxidative phosphorylation, as determined by the FATS experiment, are the following. Overall, metabolic rate increased so rapid and continuous increases in ventilation volume and oxygen consumption was observed. However, changes in ventilation rate or oxygen utilization were not observed. This means the fish increased water flow across their gills, but oxygen removal from the water was maintained at a constant rate. However, oxygen consumption increased in the mitochondrial electron transport chain, in an attempt to reproduce the proton gradient and stimulate ATP production. However, the toxicant continued to break down the proton gradient, inevitably leading to mortality.

== Applications ==
As mentioned previously, FATS have been used to establish models that predict toxicity of chemicals. For instance, FATS data is used to develop quantitative structure-activity relationship (QSAR) models. QSAR models developed using FATS data are then used to establish computer based systems that predict toxicity. For example, Russom and colleagues used Fathead Minnow (Pimephales promelas) 96-hour acute toxicity tests data, FATS data and QSARs to create a computer based expert system that predicts chemical toxicity based on chemical structures and properties. These models and systems are useful for screening chemicals to prioritize more toxic substances for further toxicity testing. This is particularly useful for industrial chemicals with unknown toxicity. This due to the quantity of industrial chemicals with unknown toxicity, for which individual toxicity testing is not realistic. In addition, models and computer systems that predict toxicity are also cost-effective in comparison to running toxicity tests on all unknown chemicals. In conclusion, predictive screening techniques derived from FATS data are practical and cost efficient.
