= Pre-spawn mortality in coho salmon =

Pre-spawn mortality is a phenomenon where adult coho salmon, Oncorhynchus kisutch, die before spawning when returning to freshwater streams to spawn. It is also known as Urban Runoff Mortality Syndrome in more recent studies. This occurrence has been observed in much of the Puget Sound region of the Pacific Northwest. During fall migration, salmonids (trout and salmon) pass through urban watersheds which are contaminated with stormwater runoff. As the coho salmon pass through these waters, many will show symptoms of lethargy, loss of equilibrium and disorientation, and die within a few hours of showing these symptoms. These symptoms and behaviors are prevalent after rain events. Mortality often occurs before salmon have the opportunity to spawn, which is determined by cutting open female carcasses and observing for unfertilized eggs. Rates of pre-spawn mortality could impact the local salmon populations. Based on model projections, if rates continue, populations of coho salmon could become extinct within the next few decades.

Weight of evidence suggests coho salmon pre-spawn mortality is due to exposure to stormwater runoff. A ubiquitous tire rubber–derived chemical induces acute mortality in coho salmon. A negative correlation exists between the incidence of pre-spawn mortality and urban land use, specifically with the impervious surfaces, commercial property type, and local roads. Exposure to metals and petroleum hydrocarbons displayed some response to pre-spawn mortality, while exposure to pesticides, diseases, and water quality variables did not elicit this effect. This trend has not been observed in any other life history stage of the coho salmon nor in other salmon species in the Puget Sound region.

== History ==
Pre-spawn mortality was first observed in the Puget Sound after efforts had gone into restoring urban watersheds in hopes of drawing salmon back to these areas. Restoration consisted of removing culverts, debris, and any other barriers. Restoration projects were successful in that salmon returned to these runs, however, in initial surveys of restoration success, the pre-spawn mortality symptoms were observed. It is now recognized that in restoring watersheds, water quality and contamination must also be considered for successful spawning events of coho salmon if the population is to persist.

Upon displaying specific symptoms (below), mortality of the coho salmon can be expected within a few hours. Mortality usually occurs before these fish have had a chance to spawn. In fact, in observing the female coho salmon carcasses, most of the fish have retained greater than 90 percent of their eggs. Pre-spawn mortality occurs in both male and female salmon, however, it is difficult to determine if male salmon have spawned, thus, pre-spawn mortality is usually signified by egg retention of female salmon. Pre-spawn mortality has also been observed in both wild and hatchery fish alike.

== Symptoms ==
Salmon of pre-spawn mortality display unusual behaviors and symptoms, such as swimming in circles or exhibiting other erratic swimming patterns. Other symptoms include lethargy, disorientation, loss of equilibrium, gaping, and fin splaying. Death of the coho salmon occurs within hours after observing these symptoms.

=== Fish behavior and swimming patterns ===
Coho salmon that are affected by pre-spawn mortality show behavioral symptoms that are easily identified. The fish displayed behaviors like swimming near the surface of the water, swimming in circular patterns, or consistently running into the river bank. This may be due to a loss of equilibrium and orientation of the fish.

=== Gaping ===
This symptom consists of the salmon repeatedly opening and closing its mouth. This action in some species of fish (e.g. eels) is used to push water over the gills to meet respiratory demands. For coho salmon, this could be an indication that the fish is not getting enough dissolved oxygen, signifying stress to the respiratory system or that the muscular system has been affected and this gaping is a forced action.

=== Fin splaying ===
Fin splaying occurs when the pectoral fin of the salmon is rigid and extended perpendicular to the body of the fish instead of laying flat against the fish. In other fish, e.g. kelp bass, this action is a startle response.

== Cause ==
A study indicated that road runoff and water samples collected at coho salmon URMS cases were chemically similar with tire tread wear particle leachate. Further investigation on URMS and tire wear leachate narrowed down the scope from thousands of chemicals to one unknown chemical, which was found as an ozonation product of the common antiozonant 6PPD. This toxic transformation product, called 6PPD-quinone, kills coho salmon at nanogram per liter concentrations. It has been detected in road runoff and creek stormwater when URMS occurred.

== Nonpoint source pollution ==
=== Urban and stormwater runoff ===
Many of the contaminants that are responsible for degrading urban watersheds come from nonpoint source pollution. This consists of a wide array of contaminants coming from a variety of sources and locations.

The contaminants that have been found in stormwater runoff include metals, such as aluminum, barium, cobalt, iron, arsenic, cadmium, chromium, copper, lead, nickel, and zinc, polycyclic aromatic hydrocarbons (PAHs), petroleum hydrocarbons (motor oil and fuel), and pesticides (including insecticides).

Anthropogenic sources are responsible for many of the contaminants in stormwater runoff in urban areas. These anthropogenic sources include motor vehicles, which contribute metals, antifreeze or coolants, and petroleum hydrocarbons from brake pads and leaking fluids. Many of these contaminants will collect on impervious surfaces (e.g. roads and parking lots) and with rain, will wash into streams, rivers, and the ocean. Other sources of runoff include pesticides and fertilizers used on residential and commercial properties, which can be washed into storm drains during rain events.

== Effects of runoff ==
There are a number of possibilities as to the cause of pre-spawn mortality. It is possible that this mortality is due to acute cardiorespiratory toxicity to the fish. The symptoms (discussed above) and rapid rate of mortality are consistent with this type of toxicity. The exact chemical combination or mixture responsible for this early mortality is not known. However, a few possible explanations are discussed below.

=== Narcotic effects ===
Narcosis is a phenomenon that occurs when a combination of organic toxicants, each at low concentrations, have a toxic effect on an organism. Narcosis has a nonspecific mode of action, where it does not target one specific site of action, but instead affects the membranes and protoplasm. These individual organic toxicants affect the fish at sublethal levels, however, the combination of contaminants can lead to mortality of the organism. However, if the stressor is removed narcotic effects can be reversed. Fish influenced by narcosis may display lethargic symptoms. Narcosis can also result in respiratory-cardiovascular responses to fish.

=== Mixtures ===
Pre-spawn mortality may be attributed to a mixture of contaminants. In nonpoint source runoff, there is often more than one chemical, thus organisms may be influenced by the combination or mixture of different contaminants. Mixtures of chemicals may have the same mode of action, which can increase toxicity due to two or more chemicals influencing the same site of an organism. The mixture of two or more contaminants may have a number of different effects to an organism, such as additive or synergistic effects. Additive toxicity occurs when the toxicity of individual contaminants (with a similar mode of action) can be summed to determine the final toxicity. Synergism occurs when the sum of two or more toxicants is greater than the sum of the individual components.

Additional combinations of effects may result from contaminants and pathogens or contaminants and physiological effects. As anadromous fish migrate from the ocean to freshwater streams, many changes take place in the osmoregulatory and ionregulatory systems due to the changes in composition between freshwater and saltwater. These changes in combination with chemical pollutants may cause the observed symptoms and death of these coho salmon. However, these specific symptoms and resulting pre-spawn mortality are not observed in other anadromous fish, thus, the coho salmon may be a more sensitive species than other salmonids.

=== Metals ===
Many metal contaminants enter the watershed due to motor vehicles and impervious surfaces near rivers and streams. Results from experiments analyzing the effects of metal contaminants on fish discovered an increase in cadmium, lead, and nickel in the gill tissue. Studies on copper and other metals demonstrate toxicity to fish due its ability to influence ionoregulation. The copper competes with other cations for the binding site on the gill of fish, and mortality may result with high enough concentrations of copper binding to these sites (see Biotic Ligand Model). Dissolved copper can also affect the olfactory nervous system in fish, by directly influencing the sensory neurons in the olfactory epithelium. This results in a reduction of olfactory senses, increasing the vulnerability of the fish to predation, as they are no longer able to use chemical cues to locate and avoid predators. These olfactory neurotoxic effects may also influence the salmons ability to navigate and find adequate streams for spawning.

=== Polycyclic aromatic hydrocarbons (PAHs) ===
Impervious surfaces and vehicles also contribute contaminants such as fossil fuels or gasoline, lubricating oils, and chemical sealants for parking lots (e.g. coal tar based sealants). These contaminants are grouped as polycyclic aromatic hydrocarbons (PAHs). Effects of PAHs on fish have shown that these contaminants can be carcinogenic and also impact early life history stages of fish. They may also influence cardiovascular physiology in fish. Additional studies are needed to determine the full effect of PAHs on fish.

== Efforts to reduce urban stormwater runoff ==
One approach to decrease runoff from entering streams and rivers is the implementation of low-impact development practices. These bioretention practices aim to filter water and contaminants in the soil and vegetation with the goal of reducing the volume of water and contaminants that enter the streams. Bioretention practices include rain gardens, vegetated swales, decrease impervious surfaces (instead using Pervious concrete), and green roofs.

== Additional examples ==
Pre-spawn mortality has been observed in other species of fish, including Chinook and sockeye salmon and steelhead. The cause of pre-spawn mortality in these fish in the Fraser River (sockeye salmon) and Klamath River (Chinook salmon and steelhead trout) differ from that observed in the coho salmon. The cause of pre-spawn mortality for the sockeye salmon in the Fraser River, BC, and Bristol Bay, Alaska, can be attributed to factors such as fish returning to spawn too early, warmer water temperatures, low dissolved oxygen and disease or parasites. In the Klamath River, mortality before spawning was due to disease, thermal stress, a low water flow and increasing numbers of salmon migrating within the same time period.

== See also ==
- Salmon run
- olfactory toxicity in fish
