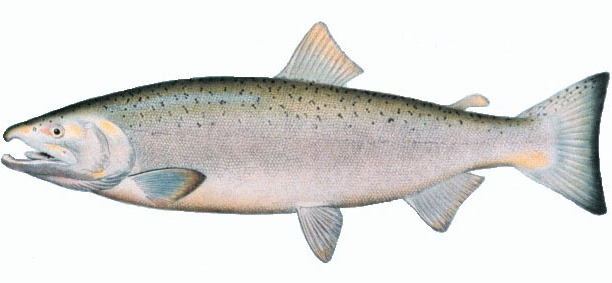

Conservation status
- Least Concern (IUCN 3.1)

Scientific classification
- Kingdom: Animalia
- Phylum: Chordata
- Class: Actinopterygii
- Order: Salmoniformes
- Family: Salmonidae
- Genus: Oncorhynchus
- Species: O. kisutch

Binomial name
- Oncorhynchus kisutch (Walbaum, 1792)

= Coho salmon =

Species of fish

The coho salmon (Oncorhynchus kisutch) is a species of anadromous fish in the salmon family and one of the six Pacific salmon species. Coho salmon are also known as silver salmon (or "silvers") and is often sold as medium red salmon. "Coho" was borrowed into English from the word k̓ʷə́xʷəθ (Note: Pronounced KWUH-hwuth), the species' name in the downriver dialect of the Halkomelem language spoken in Vancouver. The scientific species name is based on the Russian common name kizhuch (кижуч).

== Description ==
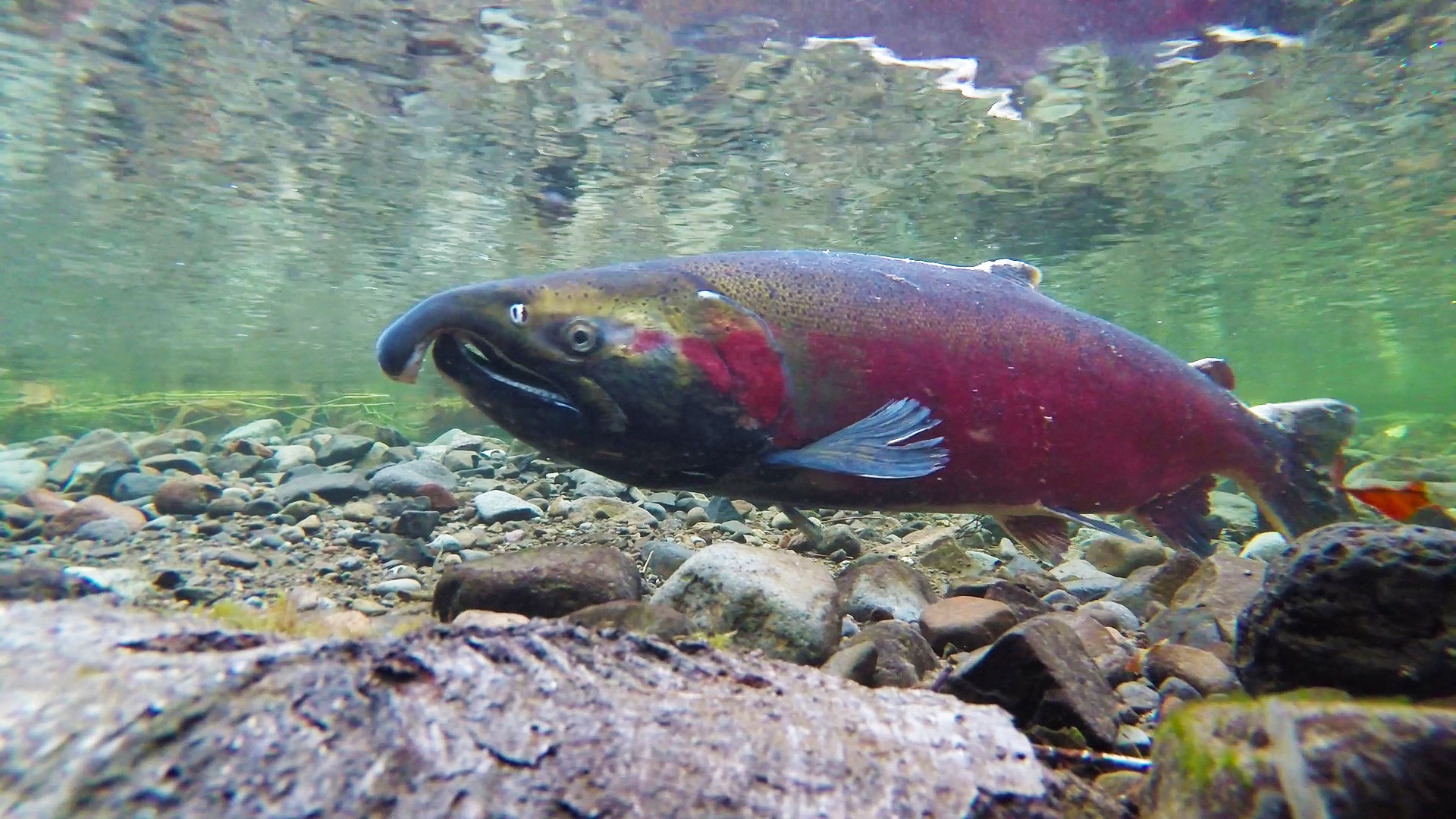
Male (spawning phase), Oregon

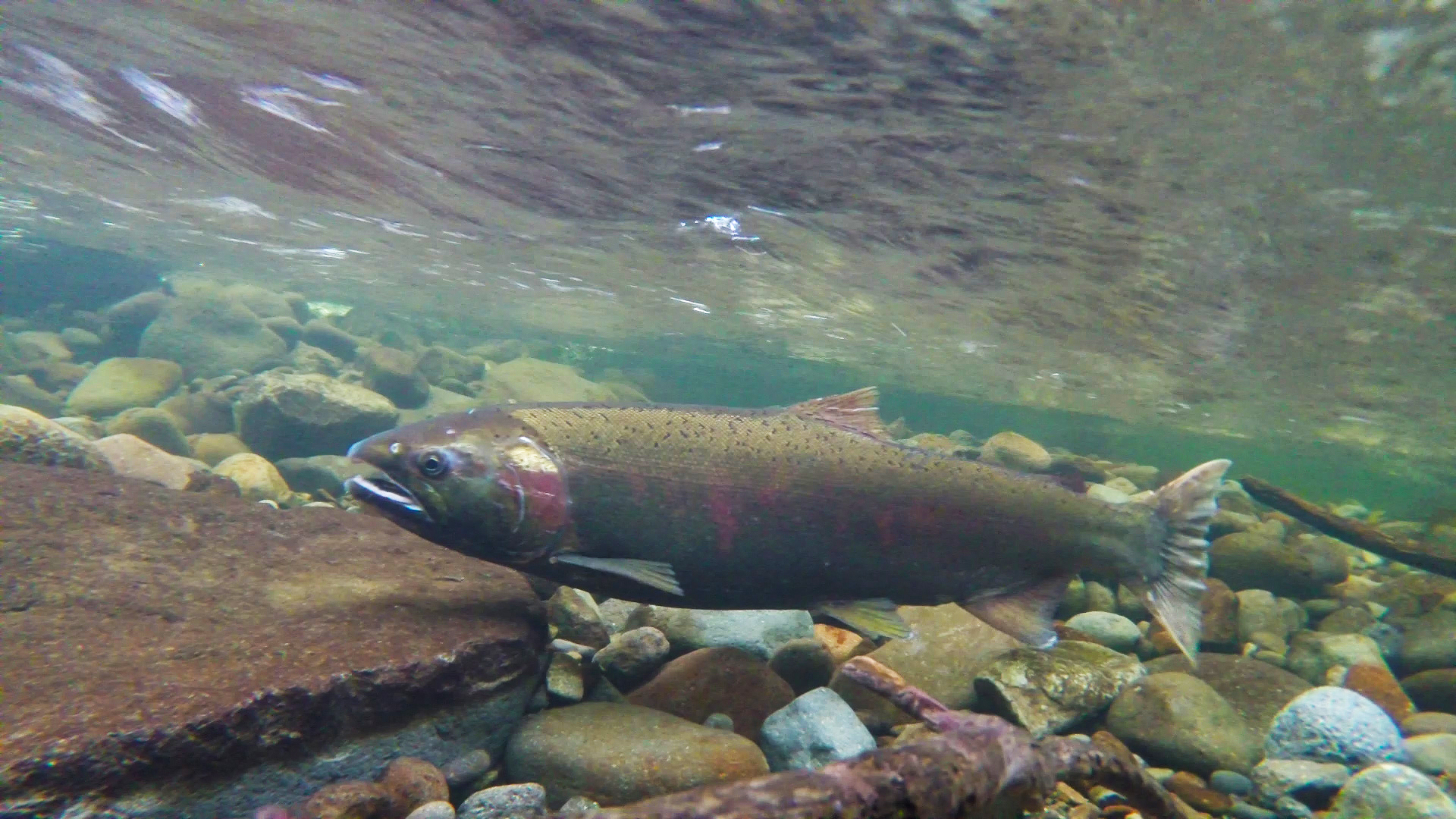
Female (spawning phase), Oregon

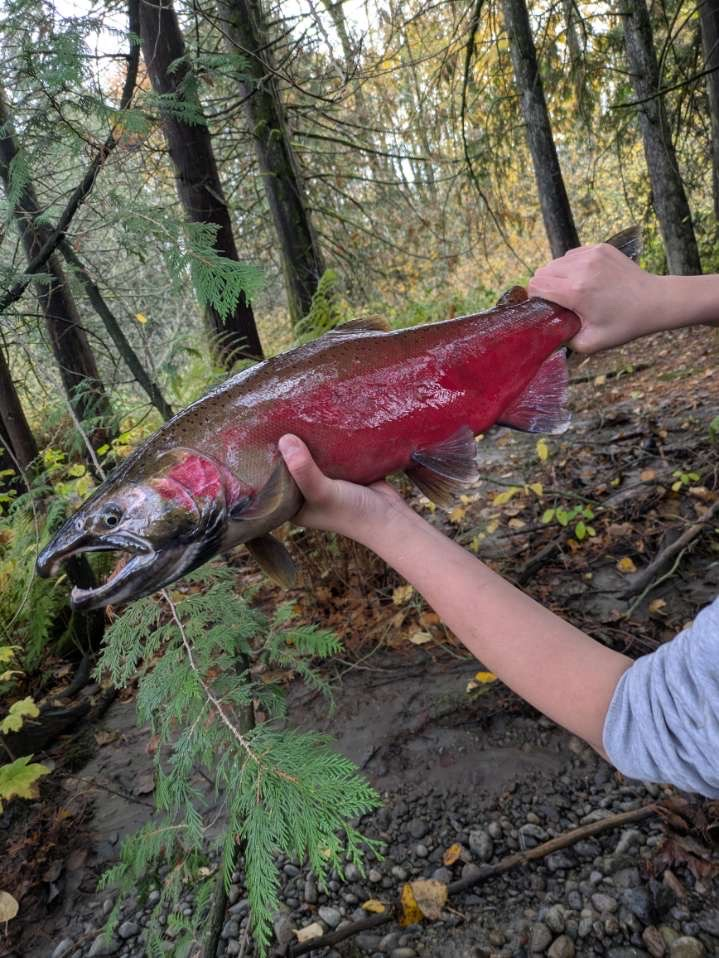
Spawning male, Abbotsford

During their ocean phase, coho salmon have silver sides and dark-blue backs with spots on their back and upper tail lobe. During their spawning phase, their jaws and teeth become hooked. After entering fresh water, they develop bright-red sides, bluish-green heads and backs, dark bellies and dark spots on their backs. Sexually maturing fish develop a light-pink or rose shading along the belly, and the males may show a slight arching of the back. Mature adults have a pronounced red skin color with darker backs and spots, with females having darker shades than males.

Coho salmon average 20 to 28 inches (50.8 to 71 cm) and 7 to 11 pounds (3.2 to 5.0 kg), occasionally reaching up to 36 pounds (16 kg). Size can vary depending on age and geographic location. Males tend to be slightly larger than females. Mature adults also develop a large kype (hooked beak) which is used to attract a mate during spawning, with males having a more pronounced kype than females. The coho salmon's lower jaw can be distinguished by a light shade at its superior edge.

== Reproduction ==
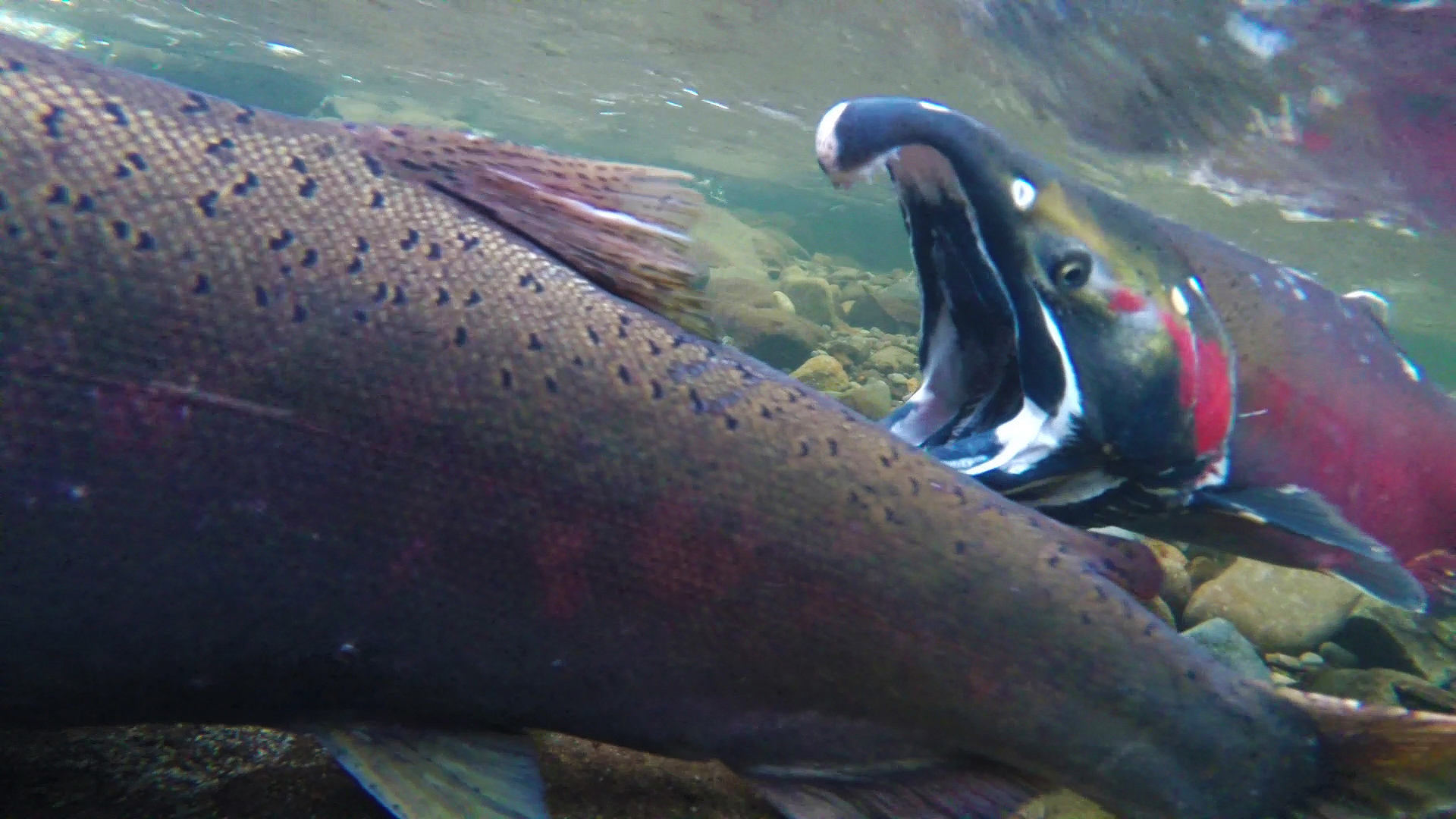
Spawning phase coho, Oregon

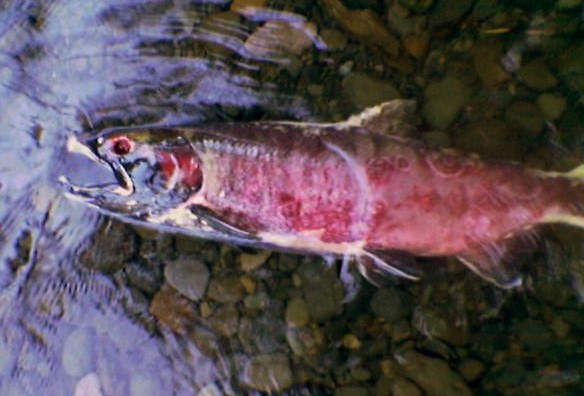
Dead coho, shortly after spawning. Live fish right after spawning will show the same white, rotting flesh shortly before death

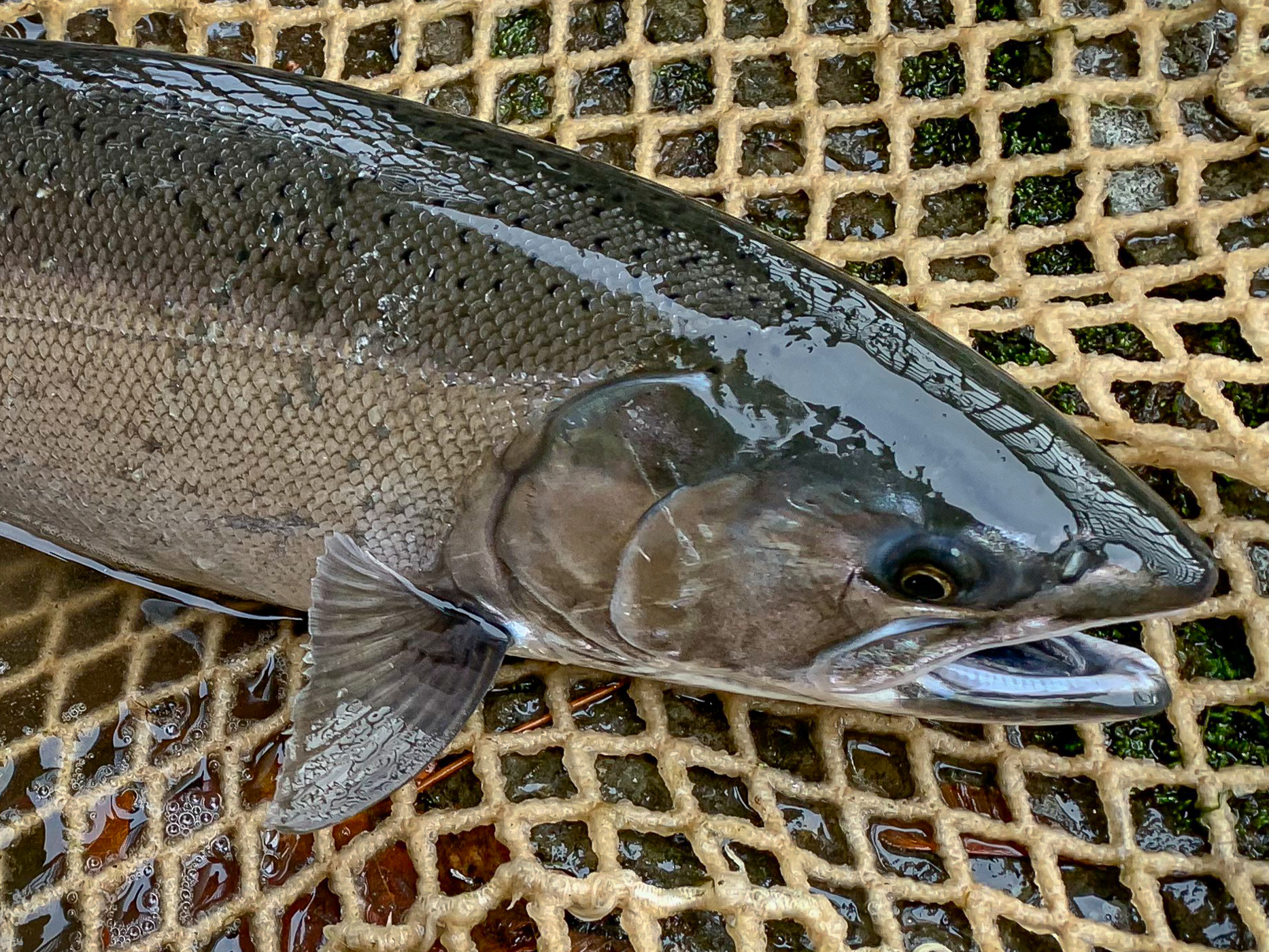
Coho salmon from Oregon

Once the mature coho has reached three or four years old, it swims up freshwater rivers and streams to spawn. Coho will swim up streams as far as they are physically able, usually reaching areas of water as little as 5 centimetres (2.0 in) deep. Females seek out beds of gravel at the head of a riffle, where they turn on their sides to dig a nest with movements of their tail, creating round or oval depressions roughly the same lengths and width as the fish. This process is repeated for up to seven nests, each called a redd. Females become extremely aggressive with each other over nesting sites, and with males until these are dug. Males then fight for the right to mate. Once a female has chosen a mate, usually the largest male, she lays her eggs onto the redd, while he simultaneously releases milt (sperm) onto the eggs. Unchosen males also sneak in to release milt at this time. Once all eggs are laid, she covers them with rocks and pebbles using her tail. The adults then begin semelparity, whereby they stop eating and deteriorate to death.

== Life stages ==
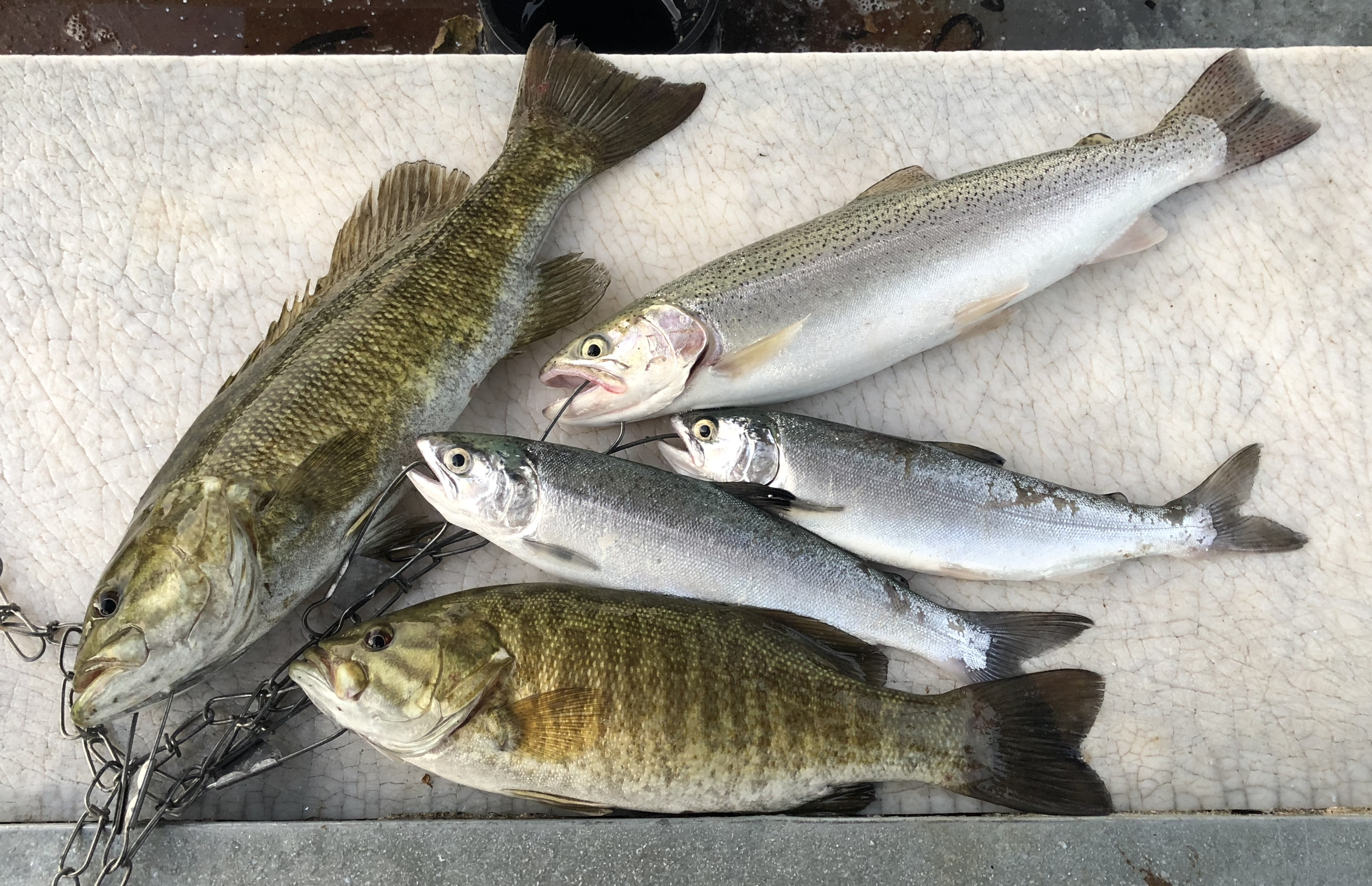
Two young coho, alongside two smallmouth bass and a rainbow trout

The eggs hatch in the late winter or early spring after six to seven weeks in the redd. Once hatched, they remain mostly immobile in the redd during the alevin life stage, which also lasts for six to seven weeks. Alevin no longer have the protective egg shell, or chorion, and rely on their yolk sacs for nourishment during growth. The alevin life stage is very sensitive to aquatic and sedimental contaminants. When the yolk sac is completely resorbed, the alevin leaves the redd. Young coho spend one to two years in their freshwater natal streams, often spending the first winter in off-channel sloughs, before transforming to the smolt stage. Smolts are generally 100–150 mm (3.9–5.9 in) and as their parr marks fade and the adult's characteristic silver scales start to dominate. Smolts migrate to the ocean from late March through July. Some fish leave fresh water in the spring, spend summer in brackish estuarine ponds, and then return to fresh water in the fall. Coho salmon live in salt water for one to three years before returning to spawn. Some precocious males, known as "jacks", return as two-year-old spawners. Spawning males develop kypes, which are strongly hooked snouts and large teeth.

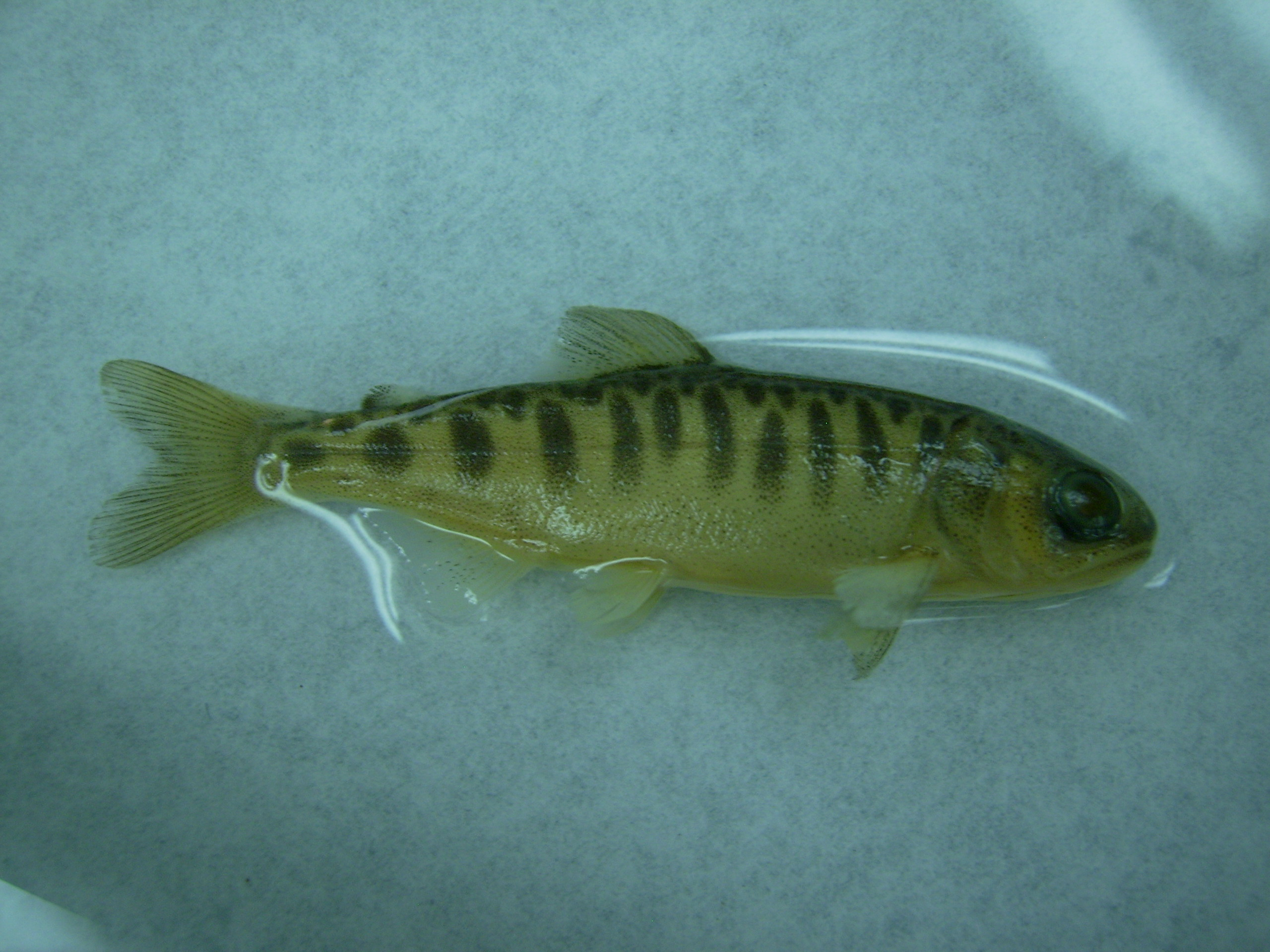
Fingerling

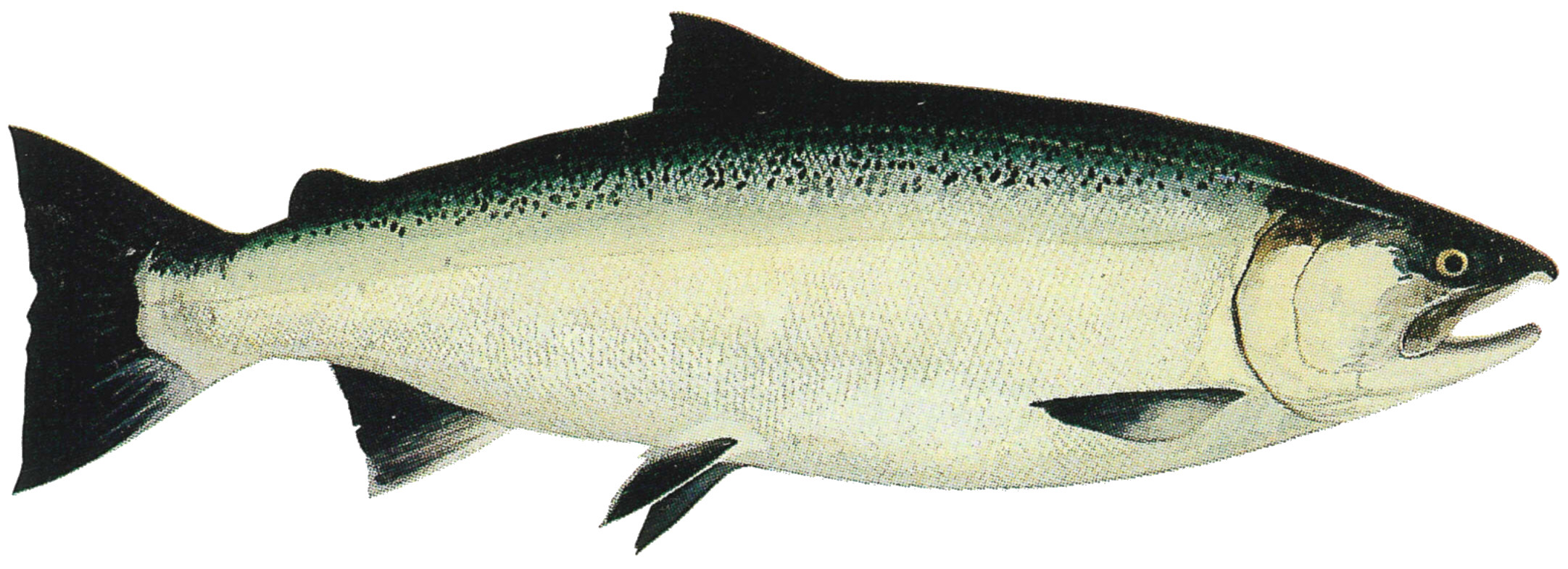
Male ocean phase coho

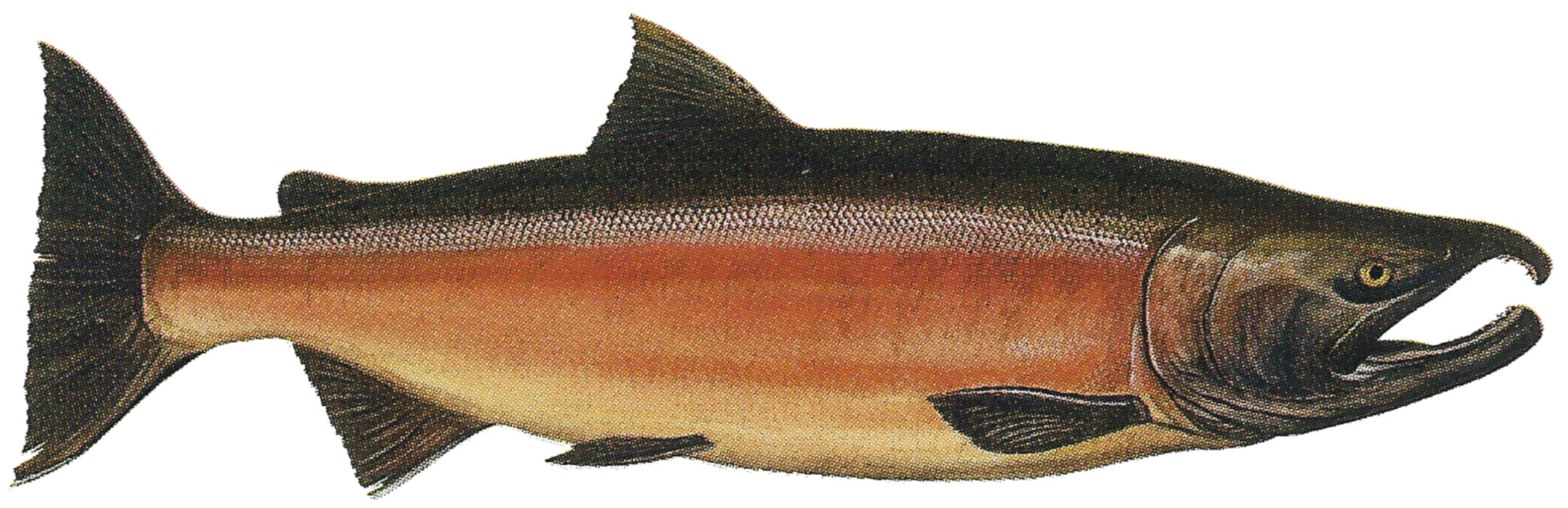
Male freshwater phase coho

== Range ==
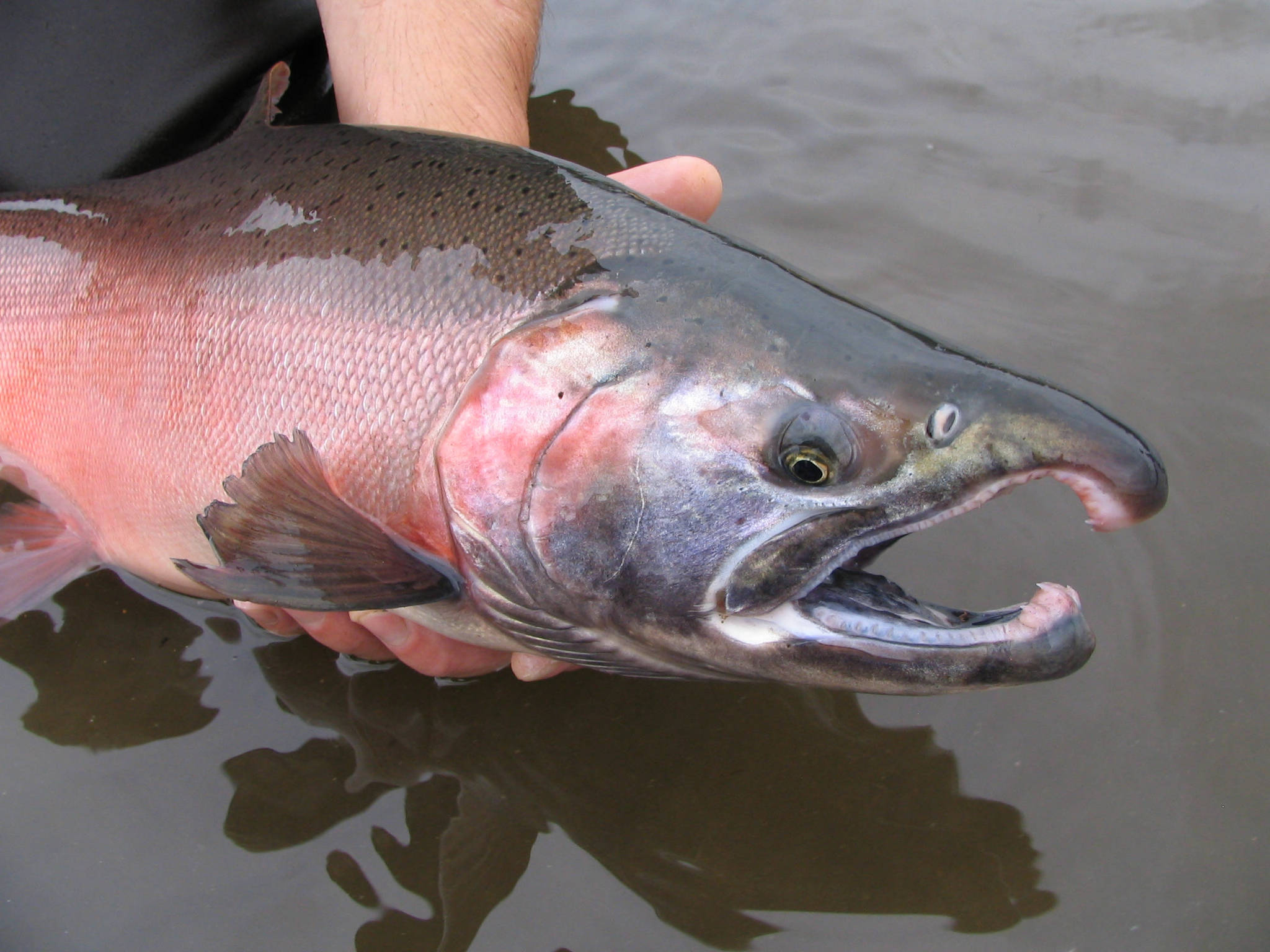
Yukon Delta NWR, Alaska

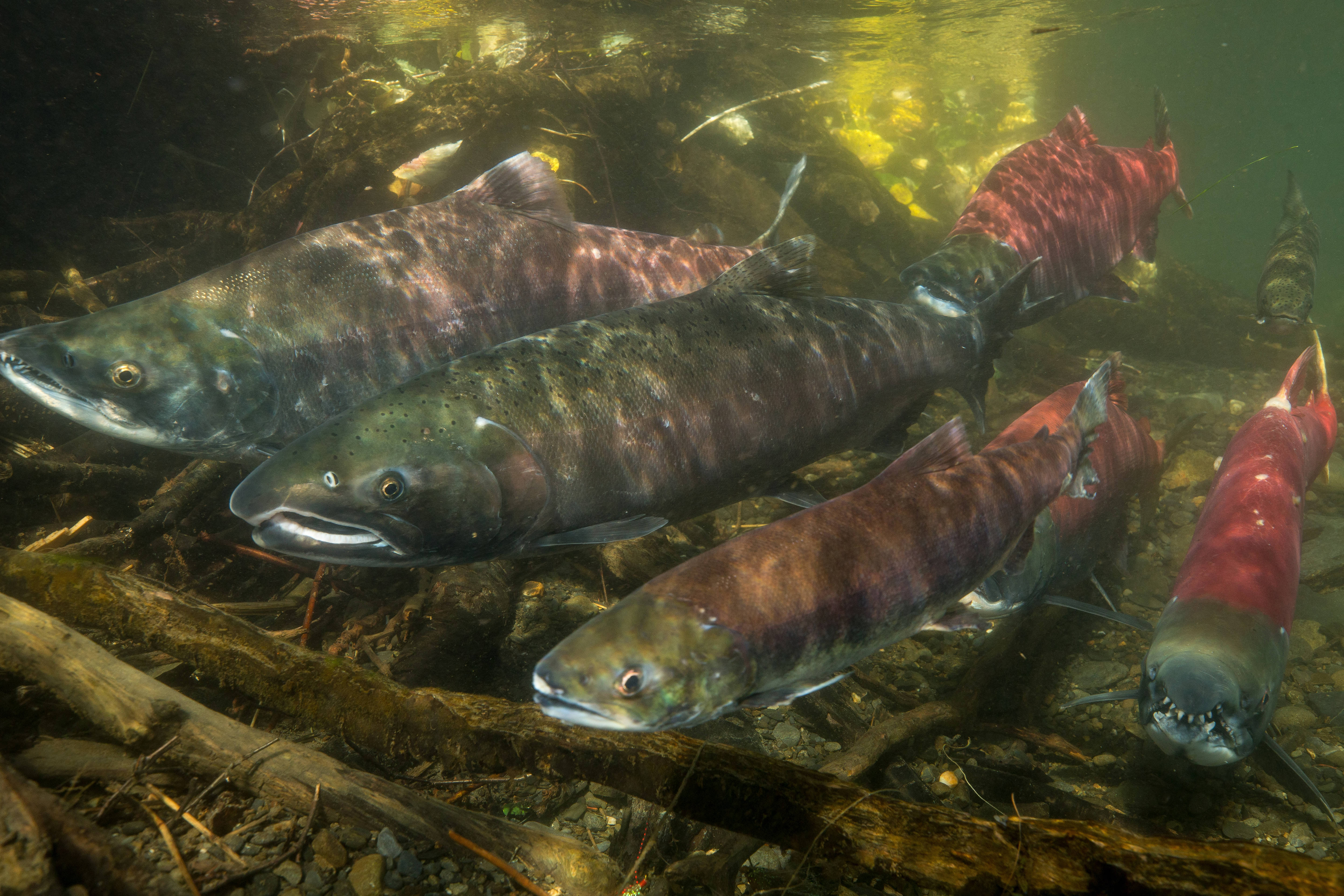
Coho with sockeye salmon, Russian River, Alaska

The traditional range of the coho salmon runs along both sides of the North Pacific Ocean, from Hokkaidō, Japan and eastern Russia, around the Bering Sea to mainland Alaska, and south to Monterey Bay, California. Coho salmon have also been introduced in all the Great Lakes, as well as many landlocked reservoirs throughout the United States. Coho salmon were first introduced in Lake Erie in the 1920s to control the lake's alewife population. Large-scale stocking began in 1966, when 660,000 fingerlings were introduced in Lake Michigan. Wisconsin began a program of introduction of 500,000 fry a year, mainly on the coastline of Lake Michigan. By 1970, the species was present in all of the Great Lakes. Ontario and Minnesota adopted stocking programs in 1969, but later abandoned them. Colorado began stocking coho salmons in the early 1900s, although only limited reproduction is recorded in the Colorado River. Another stocking was done in New Hampshire in the late 1960s, which dispersed to Maine and Massachusetts and were recorded to engage in sporadic reproduction.

Natural reproduction in introduced areas is generally low. Limited self-sustaining populations are recorded in Lake Superior and Michigan, but the salmon does not reproduce naturally in the Wisconsin tributaries of Lake Michigan and relies on stocking to maintain a large population. The species is no longer stocked in Lake Erie, although stray individuals from elsewhere in the Great Lakes are caught on occasion. Efforts to establish the species in Connecticut began in the 1800s, but were discontinued when the species failed to establish a stable population. Introductions in Connecticut and Delaware also failed to found permanent populations.

Over twenty specimens were caught in waters surrounding Denmark and Norway in 2017. Their source is currently unknown, but the salmon species is farmed at several locations in Europe, making it probable that the animal has slipped the net at such a farm.

== Ecology ==
In their freshwater stages, coho feed on plankton and aquatic invertebrates in the benthos and water column, such as Chironomids, midge larvae, and terrestrial insects that fall into the water. Upon entering the marine environment, they switch to a diet of plankton and fish, with fish making up most of their diets after a certain size. Introduced populations in the Great Lakes feed primarily on alewife and smelt. Great Lakes salmon are known to compete with native lake trout, brook trout, and brown trout for food and space when resources are scarce. Due to emerging earlier and having a larger hatching size, coho salmon typically have an advantage in these confrontations.

Salmonid species on the west coast of the United States have experienced dramatic declines in abundance during the past several decades as a result of human-induced and natural factors.

== Human uses ==
=== Fisheries ===
Capture (blue) and aquaculture (green) production of Coho(=Silver) salmon (Oncorhynchus kisutch) in thousand tonnes from 1950 to 2022, as reported by the FAO

The total North Pacific harvest of coho salmon in 2010 exceeded 6.3 million fish, of which 4.5 million were taken in the United States and 1.7 million in Russia. This corresponds to some 21,000 tonnes in all. Coho salmon are the backbone of the Alaskan troll fishery, though the majority are caught by the net fishery (gillnet and seine fishing). They average 3.5% by fish and 5.9% by weight of the annual Alaska salmon harvest. The North Pacific yields of pink salmon, chum salmon and sockeye salmon are about 15 times larger by weight.

=== Game fish ===
Freshly caught coho

In North America, coho salmon is a game fish in fresh and salt water from July to December, especially with light fishing tackle. It is one of the most popular sport fish in the Pacific Northwest of the United States and Canada. Its popularity is due in part to the reckless abandon which it frequently displays chasing bait and lure while in salt water, and the large number of coastal streams it ascends during its spawning runs. Its habit of schooling in relatively shallow water, and often near beaches, makes it accessible to anglers on the banks, as well as in boats.

It is also pursued by fly fishermen in salt water.

=== Nutritional value ===
Ocean-caught coho is regarded as excellent table fare. It has a moderate to high amount of fat, which is considered to be essential when judging taste. Only spring chinook and sockeye salmon have higher levels of fat in their meat. When smoking coho it is best to use a cold-smoking rather than hot-smoking process, due to their lower fat content compared to sockeye and chinook.

=== Cultural tradition ===
Historically coho, along with other species, has been a staple in the diet of several indigenous peoples, who would also use it to trade with other tribes farther inland. The coho salmon is also a symbol of several tribes, representing life and sustenance.

== Conservation ==
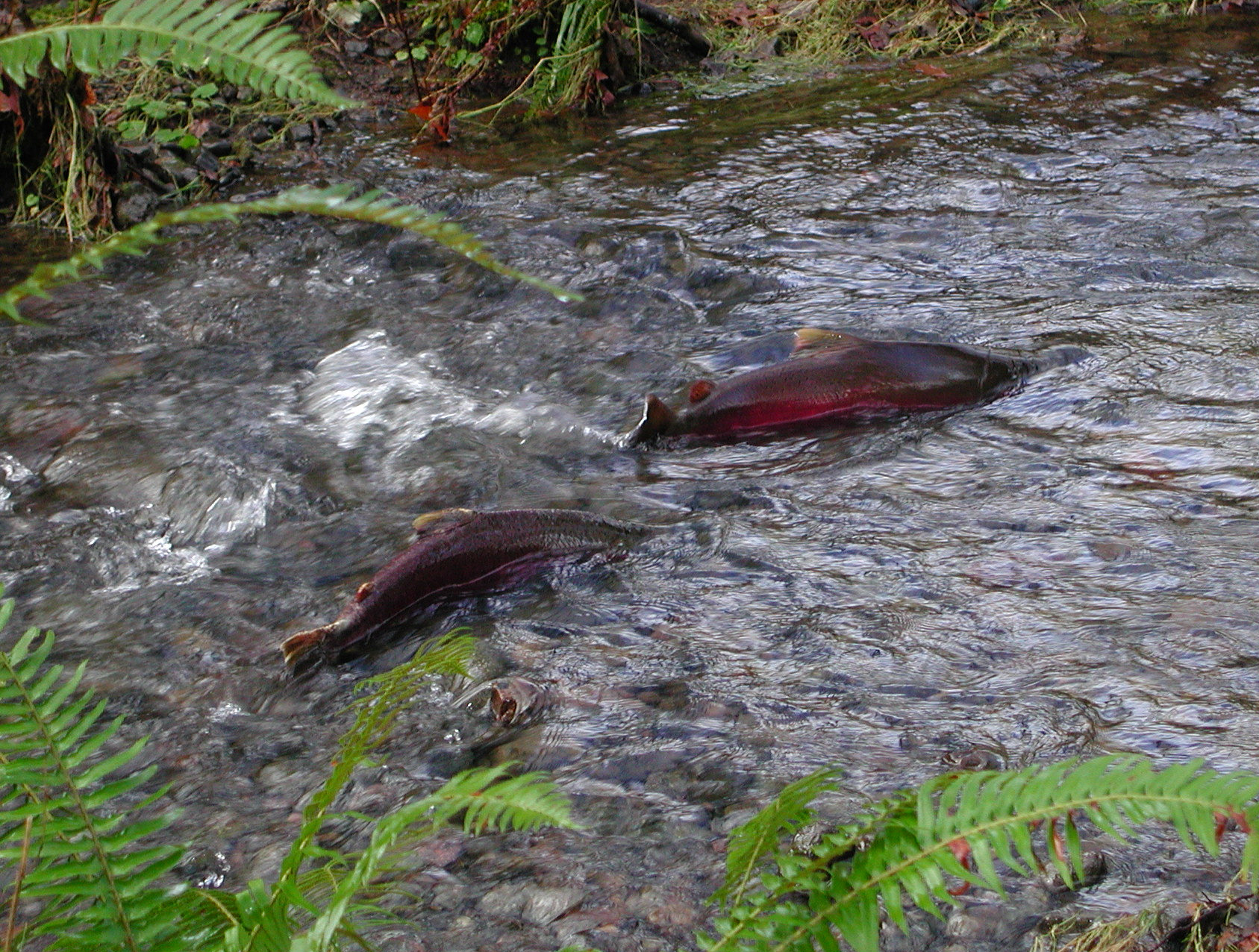
Coho salmon, Tillamook State Forest, Oregon

The U.S. National Marine Fisheries Service (NMFS) has identified seven populations, called Evolutionary Significant Units (ESUs), of coho salmon in Washington, Oregon and California. Four of these ESUs are listed under the U.S. Endangered Species Act (ESA). These are the Lower Columbia River (threatened), Oregon Coast (threatened), Southern Oregon and Northern California Coasts (threatened), and Central California Coast (endangered). The long-term trend for the listed populations is still downward, though there was one recent good year with an increasing trend in 2001.

The Puget Sound/Strait of Georgia ESU in Washington is an NMFS "Species of Concern". Species of Concern are those species for which insufficient information prevents resolving the U.S. National Oceanic and Atmospheric Administration's concerns regarding status and threats and whether to list the species under the ESA.

On May 6, 1997, NMFS, on behalf of the Secretary of Commerce, listed as threatened the Southern Oregon/Northern California Coast coho salmon ESU. The coho salmon population in the Southern Oregon/Northern California region has declined from an estimated 150,000–400,000 naturally spawning fish in the 1940s to fewer than 10,000 naturally producing adults today. These reductions are due to natural and man-made changes, including short-term atmospheric trends (such as El Niño, which causes extremes in annual rainfall on the northern California coast), predation by the California sea lion and Pacific harbor seal, and commercial timber harvesting.

More than 680,000 coho salmon returned to Oregon in 2009, double that of 2007. The Oregon Department of Fish and Wildlife required volunteers to herd fish into hatchery pens. Some creeks were reported to have so many fish, "you could literally walk across on the backs of coho," claimed a Portland television station. Lower temperatures in 2008 North Pacific waters brought in fatter plankton, which, along with greater outflows of Columbia River water, fed the resurgent populations. The 2009 run was so large, food banks were able to freeze 40 tonnes (39 long tons; 44 short tons) for later use.

== See also ==
- Pre-spawn mortality in coho salmon
- Inbreeding in fish
