= Tricaine mesylate =

Chemical compound

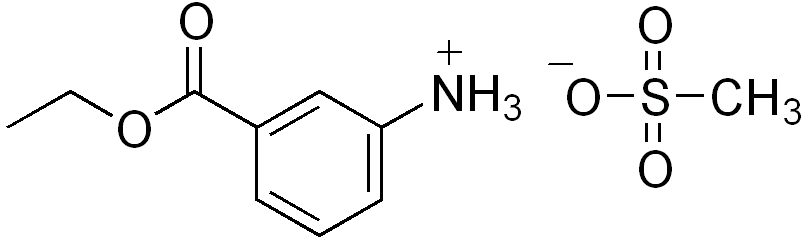

Clinical data
- Other names: Syncaine; Metacaine; Tricaine; MS-222; Finquel; TMS
- ATCvet code: QN01AX93 (WHO)

Identifiers
- IUPAC name: Ethyl 3-aminobenzoate methanesulfonic acid
- CAS Number: 886-86-2
- PubChem CID: 13454
- ChemSpider: 12878
- UNII: 971ZM8IPK1
- CompTox Dashboard (EPA): DTXSID6022133
- ECHA InfoCard: 100.011.779

Chemical and physical data
- Formula: C_{10}H_{15}NO_{5}S
- Molar mass: 261.29 g·mol^{−1}
- 3D model (JSmol): Interactive image
- Melting point: 149.5 °C (301.1 °F)
- SMILES: [NH3+]C1=CC=CC(C(OCC)=O)=C1.CS(=O)([O-])=O
- InChI: InChI=1S/C9H11NO2.CH4O3S/c1-2-12-9(11)7-4-3-5-8(10)6-7;1-5(2,3)4/h3-6H,2,10H2,1H3;1H3,(H,2,3,4); Key:FQZJYWMRQDKBQN-UHFFFAOYSA-N

Tricaine mesylate (Tricaine methanesulfonate, TMS, MS-222, Syncaine, Tricaine-S,), is white powder used for anesthesia, sedation, or euthanasia of fish and amphibians. TMS is the only anesthetic licensed in the United States for fin fish that are intended for human consumption. The drug can have selective toxicity for poikilotherms due to their lower rate of metabolism in the liver.

Tricaine is an anaesthetic that operates by preventing sodium ions from entering the cell and thus silencing action potentials. This has the net effect of blocking signal exchange between the brain and extremities.

MSD Animal Health is one of the largest manufacturers of Tricaine in Norway and other European markets under the brand name Finquel. The largest manufacturer of Tricaine in North America is Syndel under the brand name Syncaine. Syncaine is manufactured in Ferndale, Washington, in the United States. Syncaine is used for handling fish, amphibians, and other cold-blooded animals during manual spawning, as well as during marking, measuring, photography, research, surgical operations, transport, and weighing of fish.

The optimum concentration may vary with the size and species of the fish, and other variables.

It is easily soluble in water (both fresh and salt) but it drastically decreases the pH of water, increasing the acidity, which may be toxic for fish. Sodium bicarbonate can be used to buffer the solution to a pH range of 6.5-7.5. Usually an equal amount of buffer is added to attain a neutral pH. In salt/marine/sea water, the buffer use may not be necessary because sea water itself has buffering capacity. The solution of TMS needs to be prepared freshly each time because TMS is light-sensitive and might form toxic by-products upon exposure to light. Fish treated with Tricaine cannot be slaughtered for human consumption until a certain withdrawal period is reached, for example 21 days in the United States for Syncaine.
