= Toxicant =

Toxic substance

A toxicant is any toxic substance, whether artificial or naturally occurring. By contrast, a toxin is a poison produced naturally by an organism (e.g. plant, animal, insect, bacterium). The different types of toxicants can be found in the air, soil, water, or food.

== Occurrence ==
Toxicants can be found in the air, soil, water, or food. Humans can be exposed to environmental toxicants. Fish can contain environmental toxicants. Tobacco smoke contains toxicants. E-cigarette aerosol also contains toxicants. The emissions of a heat-not-burn tobacco product contains toxicants. Most heavy metals are toxicants. Diesel exhaust contains toxicants. Pesticides, benzene, and asbestos-like fibers such as carbon nanotubes are toxicants. Possible developmental toxicants include phthalates, phenols, sunscreens, pesticides, halogenated flame retardants, perfluoroalkyl coatings, nanoparticles, e-cigarettes, and dietary polyphenols.

== Related terms ==
By contrast, a toxin is a poison produced naturally by an organism (e.g. plant, animal, insect). The 2011 book A Textbook of Modern Toxicology states, "A toxin is a toxicant that is produced by a living organism and is not used as a synonym for toxicant—all toxins are toxicants, but not all toxicants are toxins. Toxins, whether produced by animals, plants, insects, or microbes are generally metabolic products that have evolved as defense mechanisms for the purpose of repelling or killing predators or pathogens."

Biocides are classified as oxidizing or non-oxidizing toxicants. Chlorine is the most commonly manufactured oxidizing toxicant. Chlorine is ubiquitously added to drinking water to disinfect it. Non-oxidizing toxicants include isothiazolinones and quaternary ammonium compounds.

An intoxicant is a substance that intoxicates such as an alcoholic drink. An intoxicant is a substance that impairs the mind and causes a person to be in a state varying from exhilaration to lethargy.
