= Globally Important Agricultural Heritage Systems =

UN Food and Agriculture organization program

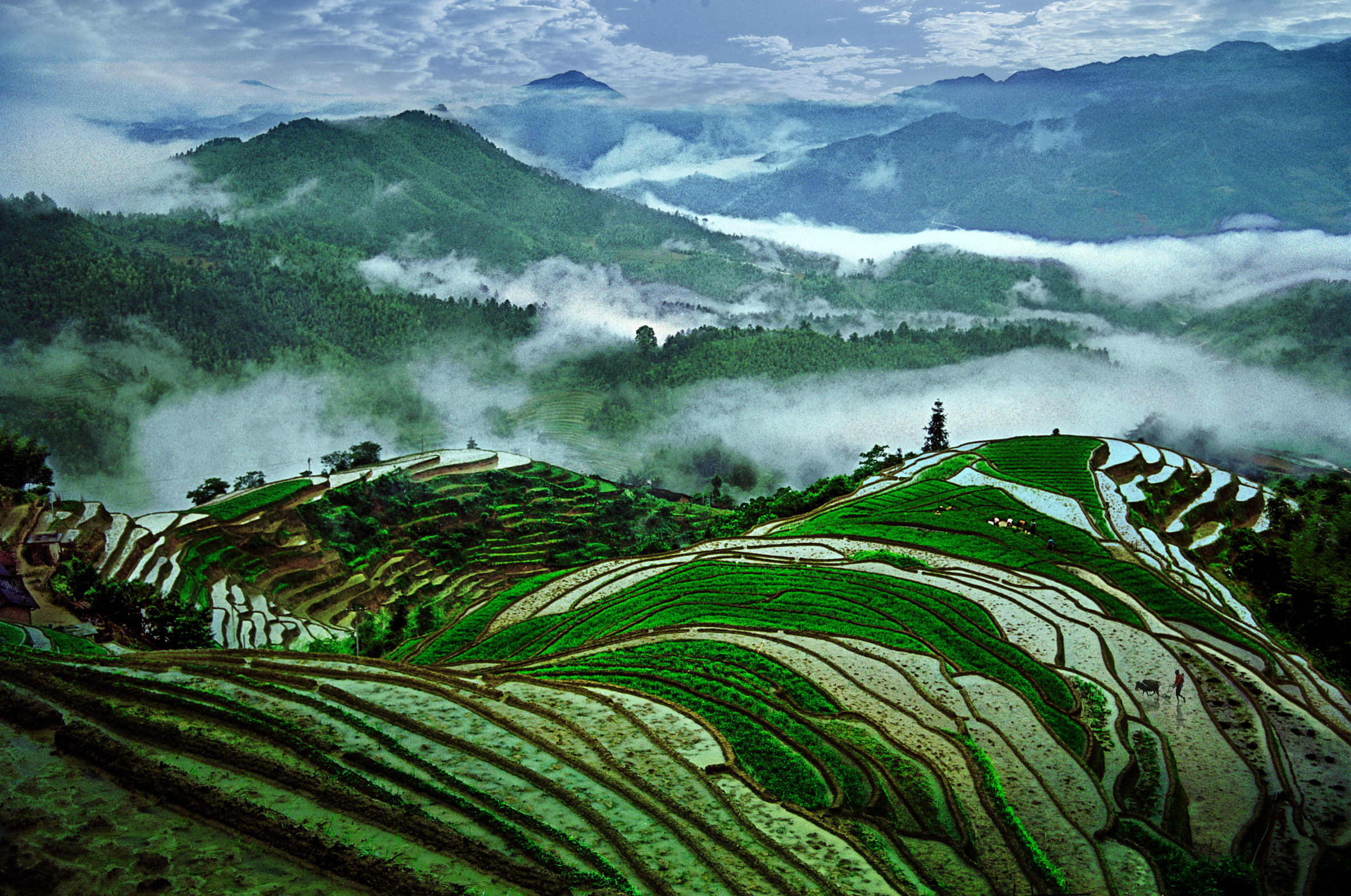
GIAHS: Rice Terraces in Southern Mountainous and Hilly areas, China

The Food and Agriculture Organization of the United Nations (FAO) leads the programme Globally Important Agricultural Heritage Systems (GIAHS), which helps identify ways to mitigate threats faced by these systems and their people and enhance the benefits derived from these dynamic systems.

Globally Important Agricultural Heritage Systems recognize remarkable land use systems and landscapes full of life and biodiversity, resilient ecosystems, and valuable cultural heritages managed by farmers, herders, fisherfolk, and forest people. Communities that have preserved and developed complex, diverse, and locally adapted agricultural systems that nowadays provide sustainably many goods and services, food, and livelihood security for millions of people around the world.

As of April 2026, the GIAHS Programme has awarded the designation to 104 sites in 29 countries.

== List of UN-designated Globally Important Agricultural Heritage Systems ==
Country	System	Image	Year Designated	Possibly related articles; other notes
Andorra	The subalpine pastures of Andorra		2023	
Algeria	Ghout oasis system		2011	El Oued, Grand Erg Oriental, oasis, agriculture in Algeria, ghout is a plural form of a noun meaning "cavity, hollow, depression" (Arabic: الغوط)
Austria	Traditional Hay milk Farming in the Austrian Alpine Arc		2023	
Bangladesh	Floating fields of Bangladesh		2015	Gopalganj, Barisal, Pirojpuro, agriculture in Bangladesh, Local/regional names: baira, geto, dhap
Brazil	Traditional agricultural system in the southern Espinhaço Range, Minas Gerais		2020	Espinhaço Mountains, Minas Gerais § Agriculture, agriculture in Brazil
Chile	Chiloé agriculture		2011	History of Chiloé, History of agriculture in Chile, agriculture in Chile
China	Kuancheng Traditional Chestnut Eco-Planting System in Hebei Province		2023	
China	Tongling White Ginger Plantation System in Anhui Province		2023	
China	Xianju Ancient Chinese Waxberry Composite System in Zhejiang Province		2023	
China	Rice terraces in southern mountainous and hilly areas of China		2018	History of rice cultivation, agriculture in China
China	Rice–fish culture in China		2005	History of rice cultivation, agriculture in China
China	Wannian traditional rice culture		2010	Wannian County, History of rice cultivation, agriculture in China
China	Honghe Hani rice terraces		2010	Yuanyang County, Yunnan, history of rice cultivation, agriculture in China
China	Dong's rice–fish–duck system		2011	Dong people, Congjiang County, agriculture in China
China	Pu'er traditional tea agrosystem		2012	Pu'er, Yunnan, Camellia sinensis, history of tea, History of tea in China, Chinese tea, Chinese tea culture
China	Aohan dryland farming system		2012	Aohan Banner, Inner Mongolia, Agriculture in China, Agriculture in Mongolia, Agriculture in Central Asia
China	Kuaijishan ancient Chinese Torreya system		2013	Torreya grandis, Kuaiji Mountains, Shaoxing, Zhejiang
China	Xuanhua urban vineyard system		2013	Xuanhua District § Agriculture, Chunguang Township Chinese: 春光乡, Guanhou village, Penyao village and Dabei village
China	Jiaxian jujube orchards		2014	Jujube, Jinshaan Canyon, Yellow River, Jia County, Shaanxi, "Chinese date"
China	Xinghua Duotian agrosystem		2014	
China	Jasmine and tea culture system, Fuzhou City		2014	Fuzhou, Camellia sinensis, history of tea, History of tea in China, Chinese tea, Chinese tea culture
China	Huzhou mulberry-dyke and fish-pond system		2017	Morus
China	Diebu Zhagana agriculture-forestry-animal husbandry composite system		2017	
China	Xiajin Yellow River Old Course ancient mulberry grove system		2018	Morus, Yellow River
China	Shexian dryland stone-terraced system		2022	She County, Anhui, List of Major National Historical and Cultural Sites in Anhui
China	Anxi Tieguanyin tea culture system		2022	
China	Ar Horqin grassland nomadic system, Inner Mongolia		2022	Ar Horqin Banner, Inner Mongolia, nomad
China	Qingyuan forest-mushroom co-culture system, Zhejiang Province		2022	Qingyuan County, Zhejiang, mushroom cultivation, agroforestry
Ecuador	Amazonian chakra, a traditional agroforestry system managed by Indigenous communities in Napo Province		2023	Chacra, Napo Province, economy of Ecuador § Agriculture
Ecuador	Andean chakra ancestral agricultural system of Kichwas Cotacachi communities		2023	Chacra, Amazonian Kichwas, Kichwa language, Cotacachi Canton, Cotacachi Cayapas Ecological Reserve, economy of Ecuador § Agriculture, Andean agriculture
Egypt	Dates production system, Siwa Oasis		2016	Siwa, oasis, date palm, agriculture in Egypt
India	Saffron heritage of Kashmir		2011	Pampore Karewas, Pulwama district, Saffron, Crocus sativus, Kashmir § Economy, agriculture in India
India	Koraput traditional agriculture		2012	Koraput district § Agriculture, Odisha, Eastern Ghats, agriculture in India
India	Kuttanad below-sea-level farming system		2013	Kuttanad § Backwater paddy cultivation (Kayal cultivation), Kerala, agriculture in India
Italy	Olive orchards between Assisi and Spoleto		2018	Olea europaea, Assisi, Spoleto, agriculture in Italy
Italy	Soave traditional vineyards		2018	Soave (wine) of Soave, Veneto, Vitis, agriculture in Italy
Iran	Traditional Walnut Agricultural System in Tuyserkan, Hamedan province		2023	
Iran	Qanat-irrigated agricultural heritage systems, Kashan		2014	Kashan, Isfahan province, qanat, agriculture in Iran
Iran	Qanat-based saffron farming system in Gonabad		2018	Qanats of Ghasabeh, Qanat, Saffron, Crocus sativus, Gonabad
Iran	Grape production system in Jowzan Valley		2018	Fruit production in Iran, agriculture in Iran, Jowzan, Jowzan Rural District, Malayer County
Iran	Estahban Rainfed Fig Orchards Heritage System, Fars Province		2023	Estahban, Fars province, agriculture in Iran
Japan	Noto's satoyama and satoumi		2011	Noto Peninsula, satoyama, satoumi, agriculture in Japan
Japan	Sado's satoyama in harmony with Japanese crested ibis		2011	Sado Island, satoyama, Nipponia nippon, agriculture in Japan
Japan	Traditional tea-grass integrated system, Shizuoka		2013	Shizuoka Prefecture, Honshu, agriculture in Japan, Chagusaba
Japan	Managing Aso grasslands for sustainable agriculture		2013	Mount Aso, Aso Shrine § Onda Matsuri, history of Kumamoto Prefecture, agriculture in Japan
Japan	Kunisaki Peninsula Usa integrated forestry, agriculture and fisheries system		2013	Quercus acutissima, Shiitake § Cultivation history, Usa, Ōita Kunisaki Peninsula, agriculture in Japan
Japan	Ayu of the Nagara River system		2015	Ayu sweetfish, Nagara River, Agriculture in Japan
Japan	Minabe–Tanabe ume system		2015	Umeboshi, Prunus mume, Nanko ume, Minabe, jp:南部川 (和歌山県) (local river), Tanabe, Wakayama Prefecture, Kii peninsula, Agriculture in Japan
Japan	Takachihogo-Shiibayama mountainous agriculture and forestry system		2015	Agriculture in Japan
Japan	Osaki Kôdo's traditional water management system for sustainable paddy agriculture		2017	Agriculture in Japan, rice production in Japan, paddy field
Japan	Nishi-Awa steep slope agriculture system		2018	Agriculture in Japan
Japan	Traditional wasabi cultivation, Shizuoka		2018	Eutrema japonicum, agriculture in Japan
Japan	Biwa lake-to-land integrated system		2022	Agriculture in Japan
Japan	Fruit cultivation system in Kyoutou Region, Yamanashi		2022	Agriculture in Japan
Kenya	Oldonyonokie/Olkeri Maasai pastoralist heritage		2011	Agriculture in Kenya, Maasai, pastoralism
Mexico	Chinampa system		2018	Agriculture in Mexico
Mexico	Ich Kool: Mayan milpa, Yucatán Peninsula		2022	Milpa, Yucatán Peninsula, agriculture in Mesoamerica, agriculture in Mexico, ancient Maya cuisine
Morocco	Ksour and social irrigation management of Figuig		2022	Figuig, oasis, date palm, agriculture in Morocco
Morocco	Argan-based agro-silvopasture, Aït Souab and Mansour		2018	Anti-Atlas § Human geography, Agriculture in Morocco
Morocco	Oases system, Atlas Mountains		2011	Oasis, Atlas Mountains, agriculture in Morocco
Philippines	Ifugao rice terraces		2011	Emergence of agriculture in the Philippines, rice terraces of the Philippine Cordilleras, agriculture in the Philippines
Peru	Andean agriculture		2011	Agricultural history of Peru, Incan agriculture
Portugal	Barroso agrosilvopastoral system		2018	Barroso (region), Barrosã cattle, Presunto de Barroso, silvopasture
Republic of Korea	Jeju Haenyeo Fisheries System		2023	
Republic of Korea	Sonteul (hand net) Fishery System for gathering Marsh Clam in Seomjingang River		2023	
Republic of Korea	Damyang bamboo field agriculture system		2020	Damyang County, South Jeolla, Bambusoideae
Republic of Korea	Geumsan traditional ginseng agricultural system		2018	Panax ginseng, Agriculture in South Korea, Geumsan County
Republic of Korea	Jeju Batdam agricultural system		2014	Jeju Province, Jeju Island, Agriculture in South Korea
Republic of Korea	Traditional Gudeuljang irrigated rice terraces, Cheongsando		2014	Rice production in South Korea, agriculture in South Korea
Republic of Korea	Traditional Hadong tea agrosystem, Hwagae-myeon		2017	Agriculture in South Korea
Spain	Ancient olive trees, Territorio Sénia		2018	Taula del Sénia, Cenia (river), Ilercavonia, Olea europaea
Spain	Malaga raisin-production system		2017	Province of Málaga, History of Málaga, Málaga and Sierras de Málaga, Malaga (wine)
Spain	Salt-production system of Añana		2017	Añana, Alava, Basque Country
Spain	Historical irrigation system at l'Horta de València		2019	Horta of Valencia, Water Tribunal of the plain of Valencia, Vega de Valencia, Weir of the irrigation canal of Quart-Benàger-Faitanar, Benàger i Faitanar canal, Quart canal, Tormos canal, Mislata canal, Mestalla canal, Favara canal, Rascaña canal, Rovella canal, Chirivella canal, Tormos canal, Royal Canal of Moncada, agriculture in Spain
Spain	Agrosilvopastoral system, León		2022	Province of León, Picos de Europa, silvopasture
Sri Lanka	Cascaded tank–village system in the dry zone of Sri Lanka		2017	Irrigation tank, agriculture in Sri Lanka
Tanzania	Engaresero Maasai pastoralist heritage area		2011	Ngorongoro Conservation Area, Engaresero village, Enguserosambu, Lake Natron, Ngorongoro District, Maasai, pastoralism
Tanzania	Shimbwe Juu Kihamba agroforestry heritage site		2011	Chaga people, Moshi Rural District, Kilimanjaro Region, agroforestry, Kihamba
Thailand	Thale Noi Wetland pastoral buffalo agro-ecosystem		2022	Thale Noi Non-Hunting Area, Siamese buffalo, agriculture in Thailand, pastoralism
Tunisia	Gafsa oases		2011	Gafsa, ancient Roman pools of Gafsa, oasis, date palms
Tunisia	Hanging gardens of Djebba El Olia		2020	Djebba El Olia, Mount el Gorrâa or Jbel el Gorrâa Mount
Tunisia	Ramli agricultural system in the lagoons of Ghar El Melh		2020	Ghar El Melh
United Arab Emirates	Al Ain Oasis and Liwa Oasis historical date palm cultivation		2015	Oasis, agroforestry, date palm, falaj
Iran	Ancient Traditional Gardens of Qazvin Bāghestān, Iran		2023	Qazvin

== See also ==
- List of Important Agricultural Heritage Systems (Japan)
