= Japanese government rice stockpile =

Strategic reserve of rice

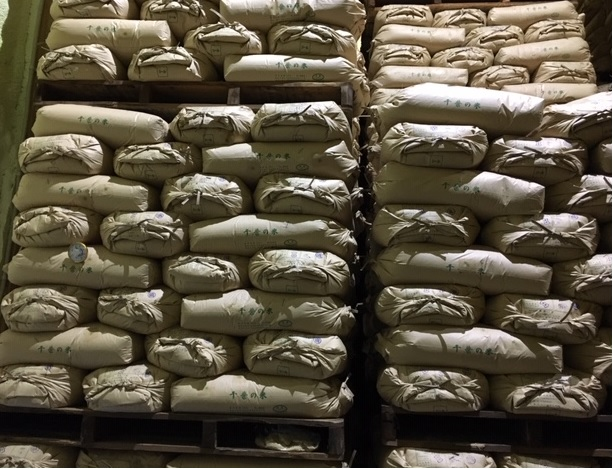
Rice stockpiled in 30 kg (66 lb) bags

The Japanese government rice stockpile (政府備蓄米, seifu bichiku-mai) is a strategic reserve of rice established after the rice crisis of the Heisei era, in 1993, caused by a bad harvest. In 1994 the Staple Food Law mandated establishing necessary stocks of rice in case of shortages. As of the end of June 2024 approximately 910,000 metric tons of rice were stored in about 300 climate-controlled locations in Japan.

In the fiscal year of 2023 cost of storage was about 14.2 billion yen (around $91.3 million). The rice reserves are rotated on a five year basis with the depreciation of rice exceeding 30 billion yen ($193 million) in the FY of 2023.

== Context ==
In June 2024, the National Rice Sales Business Mutual Aid Cooperative expected domestic rice demand to fall 41% and the number of rice producers to decrease by 65% in 2040 compared to 2020. Reduced demand from consumers, ageing of the population and population decline are contributing factors according to the association.

== History ==
In 2023 extreme heat damaged the rice harvests in Japan, leading to a decrease in production in a context of increased tourist demand and panic buying. In February 2025, the Ministry of Agriculture, Forestry and Fisheries decided to release rice reserves due to high prices of rice. As of August 5th 2025 the majority of the rice reserves had been released to stabilize the market.

== See also ==
- Rice broker
- Kura (storehouse)
- Koku
