= List of Important Agricultural Heritage Systems (Japan) =

This list is of the Globally Important Agricultural Heritage Systems (世界農業遺産, Sekai nōgyō isan) (GIAHS), as designated by the Food and Agriculture Organization (FAO), and Japanese Nationally Important Agricultural Heritage Systems (日本農業遺産, Nihon nōgyō isan) (JNIAHS), as designated by the Ministry of Agriculture, Forestry and Fisheries (MAFF), in Japan.

== Globally Important Agricultural Heritage Systems ==
As of June 2022, there are 11 designated Globally Important Agricultural Heritage Systems in Japan.

System	Prefecture	Comments	Image	Ref.
Osaki Kôdo's Traditional Water Management System for Sustainable Paddy Agriculture 持続可能な水田農業を支える「大崎耕土」の伝統的水管理システム; Jizoku kanō-na suiden nōgyō o sasaeru "Ōsaki kōdo" no dentō-teki mizu kanri shisutemu	Miyagi Prefecture	also a JNIAHS		
Sado's Satoyama in Harmony with Japanese Crested Ibis トキと共生する佐渡の里山; Toki to kyōsei suru Sado no Satoyama	Niigata Prefecture			
Noto's Satoyama and Satoumi 能登の里山里海; Noto no satoyama satoumi	Ishikawa Prefecture			
Ayu of the Nagara River System 清流長良川の鮎－里川における人と鮎のつながり－ Seiryū Nagara-gawa no ayu — Sato-kawa ni okeru hito to ayu no tsunagari	Gifu Prefecture	see Cormorant fishing on the Nagara River		
Traditional Tea-grass Integrated System in Shizuoka 静岡の茶草場農法; Shizuoka no chagusaba nōhō	Shizuoka Prefecture			
Traditional Wasabi Cultivation in Shizuoka, Japan 静岡水わさびの伝統栽培－発祥の地が伝える人とわさびの歴史－ Shizuoka mizu wasabi no dentō saibai — hasshō no ji ga tsutaeru hito to wasabi no rekishi	Shizuoka Prefecture	also a JNIAHS		
Minabe-Tanabe Ume System みなべ・田辺の梅システム; Minabe・Tanabe no ume shisutemu	Wakayama Prefecture			
Nishi-Awa Steep Slope Land Agriculture System にし阿波の傾斜地農耕システム; Nishi Awa no keisha-chi nōkō shisutemu	Tokushima Prefecture	also a JNIAHS		
Managing Aso Grasslands for Sustainable Agriculture 阿蘇の草原の維持と持続的農業; Aso no sōgen no iji to jizoku-teki nōgyō	Kumamoto Prefecture			
Kunisaki Peninsula Usa Integrated Forestry, Agriculture and Fisheries Systems クヌギ林とため池がつなぐ国東半島・宇佐の農林水産循環; Kunugi-rin to tame ike ga tsunagu Kunisaki-hantō・Usa no nōrin suisan junkan	Ōita Prefecture			
Takachihogo-Shiibayama Mountainous Agriculture and Forestry System 高千穂郷・椎葉山の山間地農林業複合システム; Takachiho-gō・Shiiba-yama no sankan-chi nōringyō fukugō shisutemu	Miyazaki Prefecture			

=== Proposed systems ===
As of June 2022, six systems have been proposed for future designation.

System	Prefecture	Comments	Image	Ref.
Safflower System in the Mogami River Basin, Mogami River Basin Region, Yamagata 歴史と伝統がつなぐ山形の「最上紅花」～日本で唯一、世界でも稀有な紅花生産・染色用加工システム～ Rekishi to dentō ga tsunagu Yamagata no "Mogami kōka" — Nihon de yuiitsu, sekai demo keu-na benibana seisan senshoku-yō kakō shisutemu	Yamagata Prefecture	a JNIAHS		
The Musashino's Fallen Leaves Manure Agricultural System that is still Alive in the Suburb of Tokyo, Musashino Area, Saitama 武蔵野の落ち葉堆肥農法; Musashino no ochiba taihi nōhō	Saitama Prefecture	a JNIAHS		
Fruit Cultivation System in Kyoutou Region [ja], Yamanashi 盆地に適応した山梨の複合的果樹システム; Bonchi ni tekiō shita Yamanashi no fukugō-teki kaju shisutemu	Yamanashi Prefecture	a JNIAHS		
Biwa Lake to Land Integrated System 森・里・湖（うみ）に育まれる漁業と農業が織りなす琵琶湖システム; Mori・sato・umi ni hagukumareru gyogyō to nōgyō ga orinasu Biwa-ko shisutemu	Shiga Prefecture	a JNIAHS		
Integrated Tajima Beef Production System 兵庫美方地域の但馬牛システム; Hyōgo Mikata-chiiki no Tajima-gyū shisutemu	Hyōgo Prefecture	a JNIAHS		
From Traditional Ironmaking to Sustainable Agriculture: The Rural Development System of the Okuizumo Area, Okuizumo Area, Shimane たたら製鉄に由来する奥出雲の資源循環型農業; Tatara seitetsu ni yurai suru Okuizumo no shigen junkan-gata nōgyō	Shimane Prefecture	a JNIAHS		

== Japanese Nationally Important Agricultural Heritage Systems ==
In addition to the three GIAHS above that are also JNIAHS, and the six JNIAHS above that have been put forward for designation as GIAHS, as of June 2022, thirteen systems have been designated.

System	Prefecture	Comments	Image	Ref.
Paddy-Carp Culture System Using the Blessing of Snow 雪の恵みを活かした稲作・養鯉システム; Yuki no megumi o ikashita inasaku・yōkoi shisutemu	Niigata Prefecture			
Himi's Sustainable Fixed Net Fisheries 氷見の持続可能な定置網漁業; Himi no jizoku kanō-na teichi-ami gyogyō	Toyama Prefecture			
Mikata Five Lakes Brackish Water Lake and Marsh Fishing System 三方五湖の汽水湖沼群漁業システム; Mikata go-ko no kisui koshō-gun gyogyō shisutemu	Fukui Prefecture			
Ama-Fishery and Pearl-Culture of Toba-Shima 鳥羽・志摩の海女漁業と真珠養殖業－持続的漁業を実現する里海システム－ Toba・Shima no ama gyogyō to shinju yōshoku-gyō — jizoku-teki gyogyō o jitsugen suru satoumi shisutemu —	Mie Prefecture			
Owase Hinoki Forestry produced from Steep Terrain and Heavy Rain 急峻な地形と日本有数の多雨が生み出す尾鷲ヒノキ林業; Kyūshun-na chikei to Nihon yūsū no tau ga umidasu Owase hinoki ringyō	Mie Prefecture			
Tamba-Sasayama Black Soybean Cultivation — Fine Seeds and Family Farming Supported by the Community 丹波篠山の黒大豆栽培～ムラが支える優良種子と家族農業～ Tanba-Sasayama no koku-daizu saibai ~ mura ga sasaeru yūryō shushi to kazoku nōgyō	Hyōgo Prefecture			
Minamiawaji Wet Rice, Onion, and Livestock Rotation System 南あわじにおける水稲・たまねぎ・畜産の生産循環システム; Minamiawaji ni okeru suitō・tamanegi・chikusan no seisan junkan shisutemu	Hyōgo Prefecture			
Arida Mikan System that Laid the Foundations for Mikan Cultivation みかん栽培の礎を築いた有田みかんシステム; Mikan saibai no ishizue o kizuita Arida mikan shisutemu	Wakayama Prefecture			
Shimotsu Mikan Warehouse System 下津蔵出しみかんシステム; Shimotsu kuradashi mikan shisutemu	Wakayama Prefecture			
Sustainable Agriculture and Forestry System Connecting Sacred Mount Kōya and the Upper Course of the Arida River 聖地高野山と有田川上流域を結ぶ持続的農林業システム; Seichi Kōya-san to Arida-gawa kami-ryūiki o musubu jizoku-teki nōringyō shisutemu	Wakayama Prefecture			
Ehime and Nanyō Citrus Cultivation System 愛媛・南予の柑橘農業システム; Ehime・Nanyō no kankitsu nōgyō shisutemu	Ehime Prefecture			
Miyazaki's "Dried Vegetables" Nurtured by Sun and Wind in an Advanced Open Farming Utilization System 宮崎の太陽と風が育む「干し野菜」と露地畑作の高度利用システム; Miyazaki no taiyō to kaze ga hagukumu "hoshi yasai" to roji hatasaku no kōdo riyō shisutemu	Miyazaki Prefecture			
Obi Forestry, which Produced Shipbuilding Materials, and Linked "Nichinan Bonito Pole Fishing" 造船材を産出した飫肥（おび）林業と結びつく「日南かつお一本釣り漁業」 Zōsen-zai o sanshutsu shita Obi (obi) ringyō to musubi tsuku "Nichinan katsuo ippondzuri gyogyō"	Miyazaki Prefecture			

== Other agricultural heritage initiatives ==
Related initiatives include the network of World Heritage Irrigation Structures (世界遺産のかんがい施設), as recognized by the International Commission on Irrigation and Drainage, of which Japan has thirty-nine as of June 2022, and MAFF's Savor Japan Areas (食と農の景勝地).

== See also ==
- Cultural Landscape (Japan)
- 100 Terraced Rice Fields of Japan
- 100 Fishing Village Heritage Sites (Japan)
