= Rice production in South Korea =

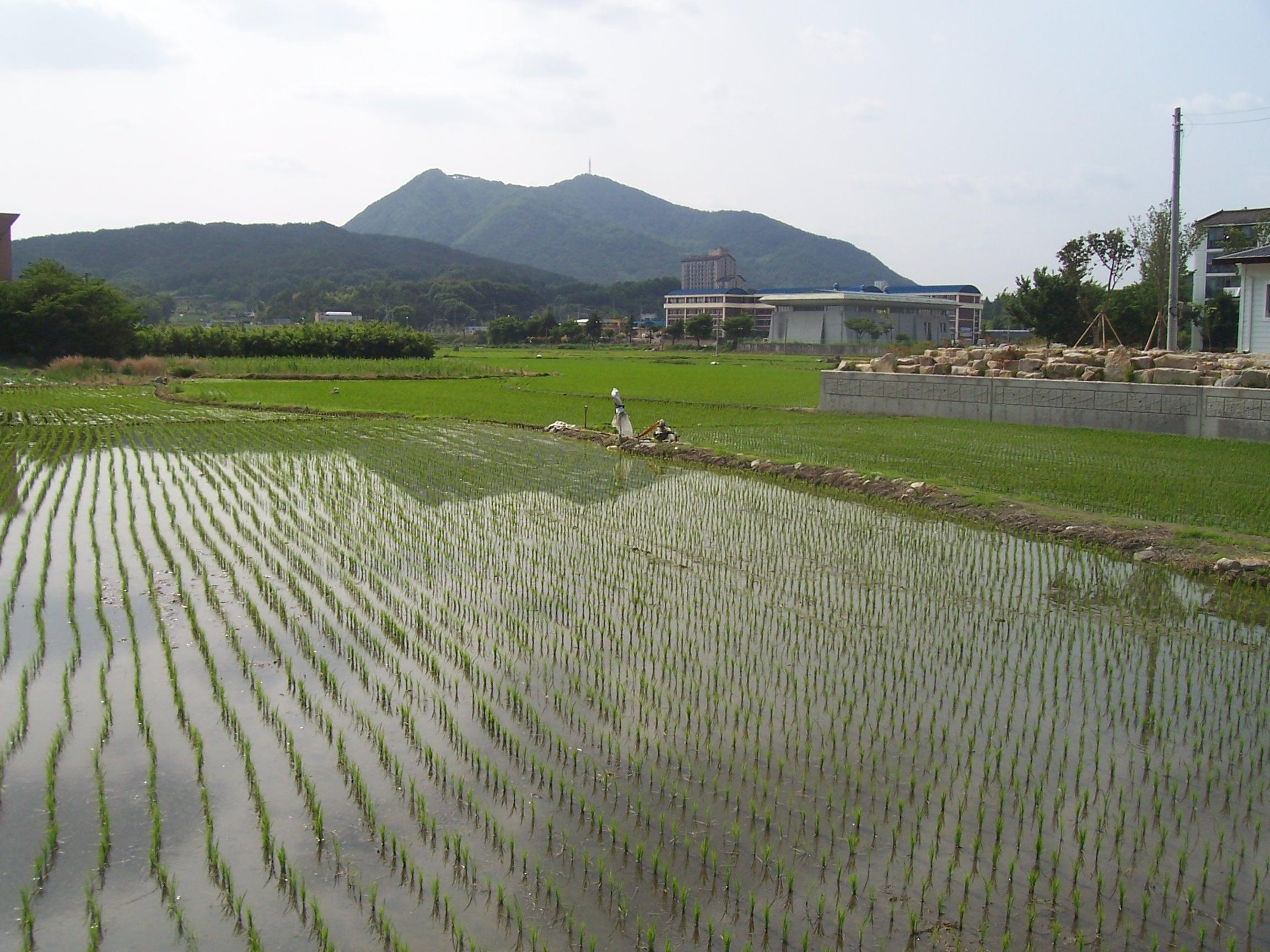
Rice fields on the outskirts of Namwon

Rice production in South Korea is important for the food supply in the country, with rice being a common part of the Korean diet. In 2009, South Korea produced 3,899,036 metric tonnes (4,297,951 tons) of rice, primarily of the short grain white japonica variety of oryza sativa, known in Korea as baekmi (백미). Output has since declined: according to the final 2023 estimate from Statistics Korea, the country produced about 3.70 million tonnes of rice, down 1.6 percent from 3.76 million tonnes in 2022, as the planted area fell 2.6 percent to a record-low 708,012 hectares.

Rice is the most valuable crop in South Korea. However, as noted by Donald S. Macdonald, rising wage levels and land values have made it expensive to produce. Rice represented about 90 percent of total grain production and over 40 percent of farm income; the 1988 rice crop was 6.5 million tonnes. Rice was imported in the 1980s, but the amount depended on the success of domestic harvests. The government's rice support program reached a record of US$1.9 billion in 1986 compared to $890 million in 1985. By raising procurement prices by 14 percent to the 1986 level, Seoul achieved a rice price structure that was about five times that of the world market in 1987.

In 2015, South Korea's rice consumption hit a record low of 65.1 kg per person, while flour consumption was the highest since 2006 at 33.6 kg, according to industry and official data. The South Korean government, which is subsidizing rice production and storage, has accumulated a large stockpile of rice.

== Production figures ==
=== Rice Production in South Korea ===
Rice Production in 2019~2021
	2019			2020			2021		
Administrative districts	Cultivation area (ha)	Production per 1,000 m^{2}(kg)	Total production (t)	Cultivation area (ha)	Production per 1,000 m^{2}(kg)	Total production (t)	Cultivation area (ha)	Production per 1,000 m^{2}(kg)	Total production (t)
Seoul	123	488	602	121	464	563	187	512	958
Busan	2,330	510	11,880	2,307	446	10,281	2,169	531	11,523
Daegu Metropolitan City	2,752	498	13,704	2,919	485	14,149	2,847	523	14,895
Incheon Metropolitan City	10,233	491	50,268	10,375	482	50,006	11,747	507	59,550
Gwangju Metropolitan City	5,020	491	24,644	4,966	457	22,696	4,910	510	25,047
Daejeon Metropolitan City	1,074	504	5,412	945	478	4,515	1,131	533	6,025
Ulsan Metropolitan City	3,897	466	18,146	3,907	456	17,798	3,793	497	18,837
Sejong City	3,943	532	20,980	3,891	508	19,754	3,340	547	18,281
Gyeonggi-do	76,642	488	373,740	75,127	464	348,221	74,717	512	382,680
Gangwon-do	28,640	527	150,901	28,405	448	127,387	28,903	538	155,501
Chungcheongbuk-do	33,247	523	173,916	32,745	491	160,623	33,403	523	174,848
Chungcheongnam-do	132,171	537	709,209	131,279	516	677,524	135,398	571	773,012
Jeollabuk-do	112,141	539	604,503	110,875	501	555,760	114,509	519	593,861
Jeollanam-do	153,919	471	724,643	156,026	441	687,299	155,101	508	788,567
Gyeongsangbuk-do	97,465	543	529,210	97,255	509	495,055	95,830	541	518,007
Gyeongsangnam-do	65,979	503	332,096	65,028	483	314,333	64,079	529	338,698
Jeju Island	8	215	16	8	231	18	6	382	21

=== Special rice brands ===
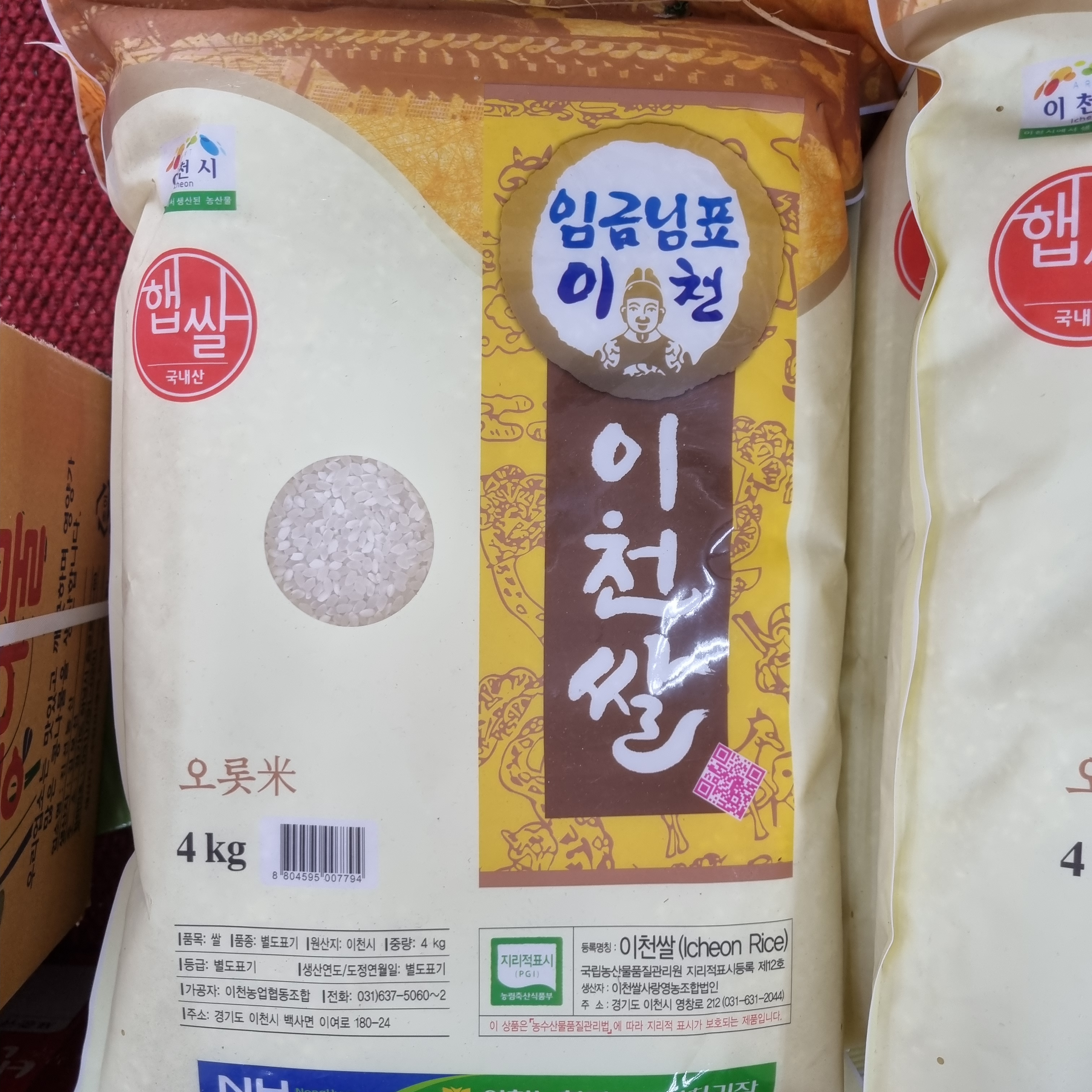
Icheon rice(이천쌀)

==== Icheon rice ====
Icheon rice(이천 쌀) is a japonica variety rice produced in Icheon, Gyeonggi-do. Icheon rice is the most preferred product among large and small retailers such as E-Mart, Lotte Mart, and Homeplus. Icheon rice has fewer calories, fat, and protein than other regions, and thiamine, niacin, vitamins, and essential amino acids, which make rice taste better, and taste better than other local rice even after March to April of the following year. There are three reasons why Icheon rice tastes good. First, 88% of farmers in Icheon farm underground water. Secondly, Icheon, Gyeonggi-do, is a basin-type topography located in the center of the inland, and has excellent quality due to the large seasonal temperature difference and daily temperature difference between day and night. Thus the region has a good environment for growing rice due to the higher sunlight during the bearing season. Thirdly, the soil fertility is good. This is because of high levels of granite gneiss present in the gray-brown soil. Water can be controlled better, and nutrition can be supplied to the crop until the late stage of growth.

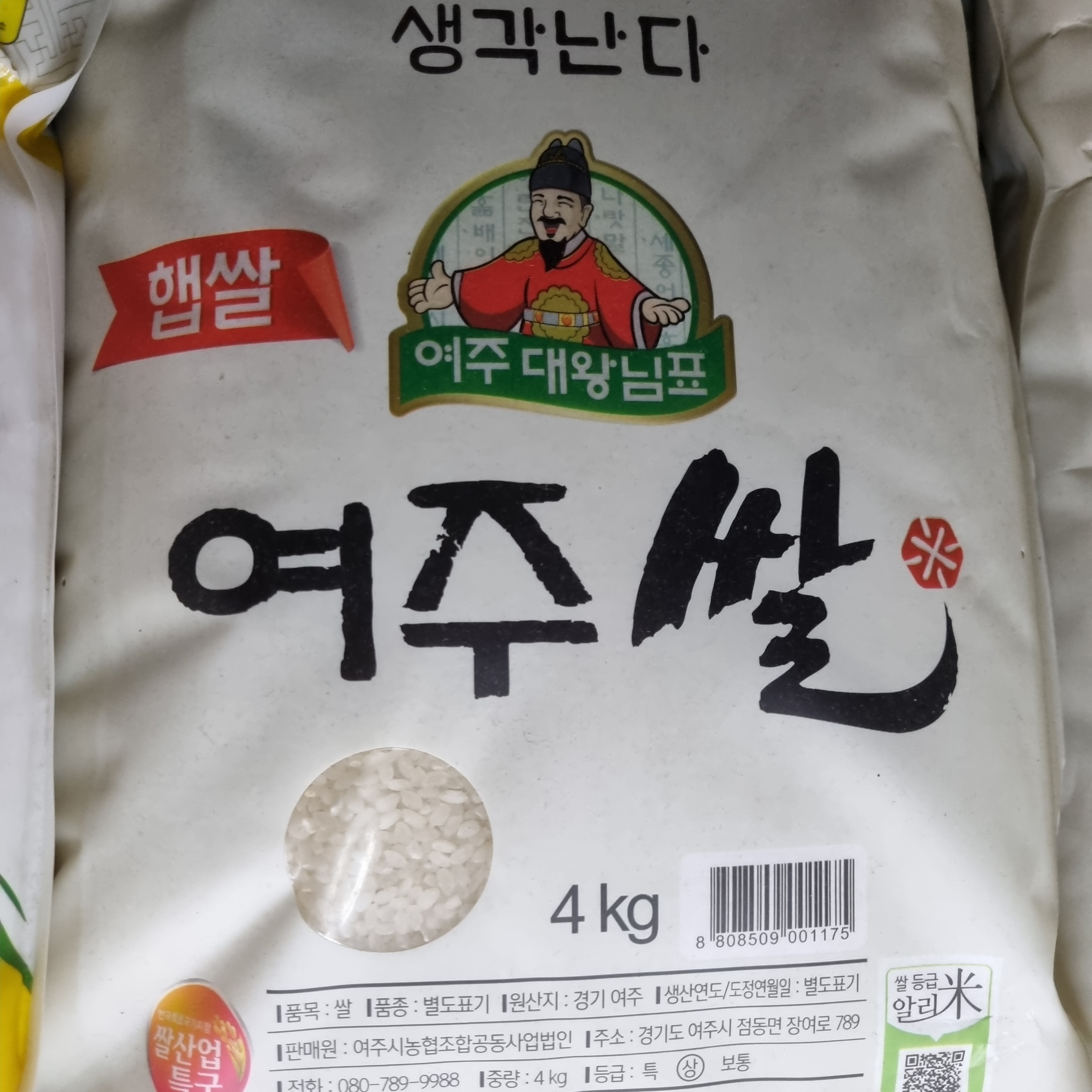
Yeoju rice (여주쌀)

==== Yeoju rice ====
Yeoju rice(여주 쌀) is a rice produced in Yeoju, Gyeonggi-do. Yeoju rice has obtained a "G mark" only available by certification of the governor of Gyeonggi-do. The 'G Mark' is a brand mark given exclusively to agricultural products from Gyeonggi-do. The reason why Yeoju rice is considered superior is that Yeoju enjoys climatic advantages. It is not located in an area greatly affected by drought and flooding; there are few high mountains, so there are longer sunshine hours; and the daily temperature difference between day and night is larger than in other areas. Yeoju has superior water quality because the Namhan River flows through the center of the region. Finally, the area can produce high-quality rice because the land is high in biological content.

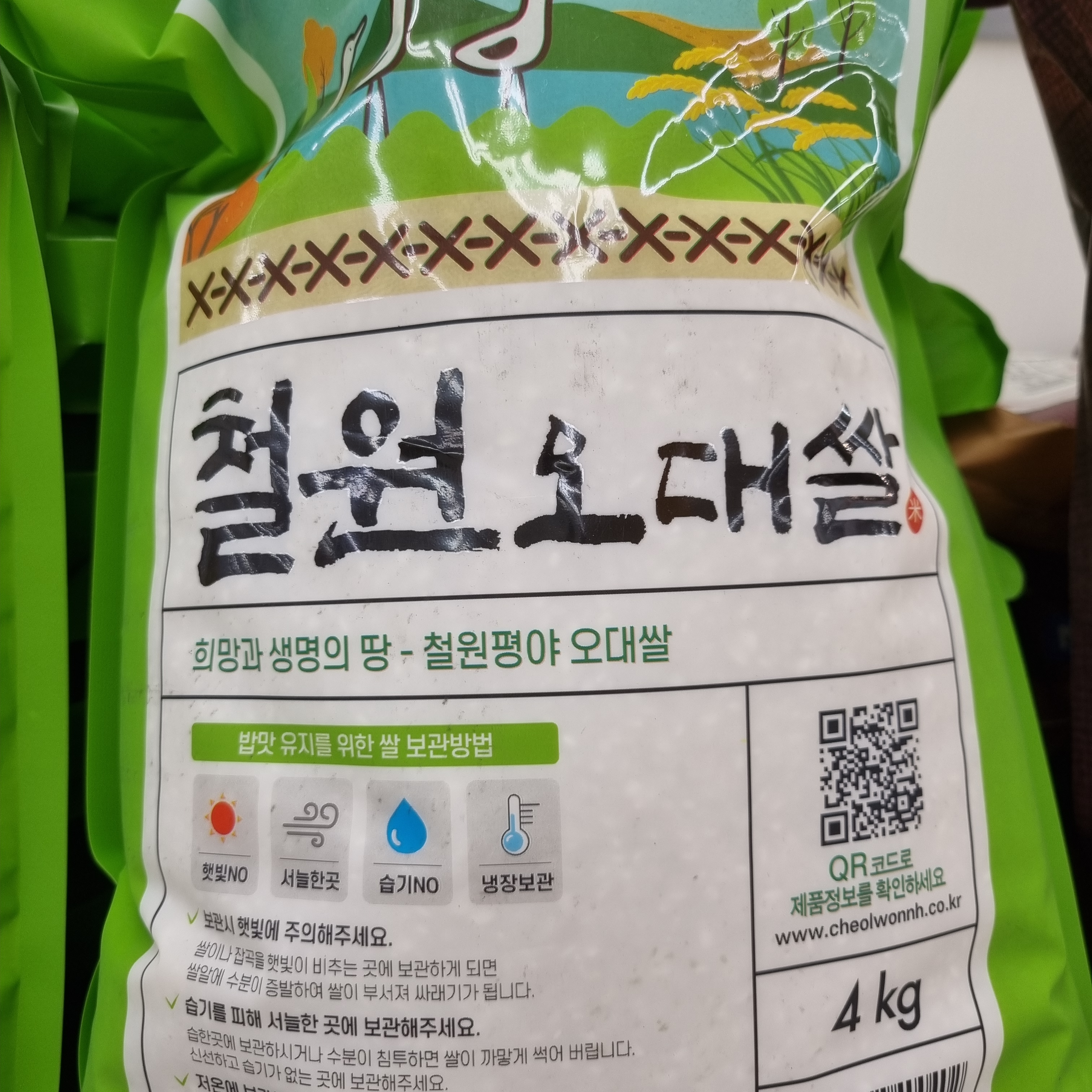
Cheolwon odae rice (철원오대쌀)

==== Cheolwon odae rice ====
Cheolwon Odae(철원오대 쌀) rice is rice produced on land near the Demilitarized Zone in Cheolwon, Gangwon-do. Rice grains are larger than other rice, and the aging of rice is slow, so the taste can be maintained for a long time. Cheolwon Odae rice has a unique savory and sweet taste. It is also characterized by a white dot next to the grain of rice. It is cultivated on the Cheolwon plain, which is composed of highly nutritious basalt inorganic ocher soil. Cheolwon has significant daily temperature fluctuations, so can grow sticky rice.

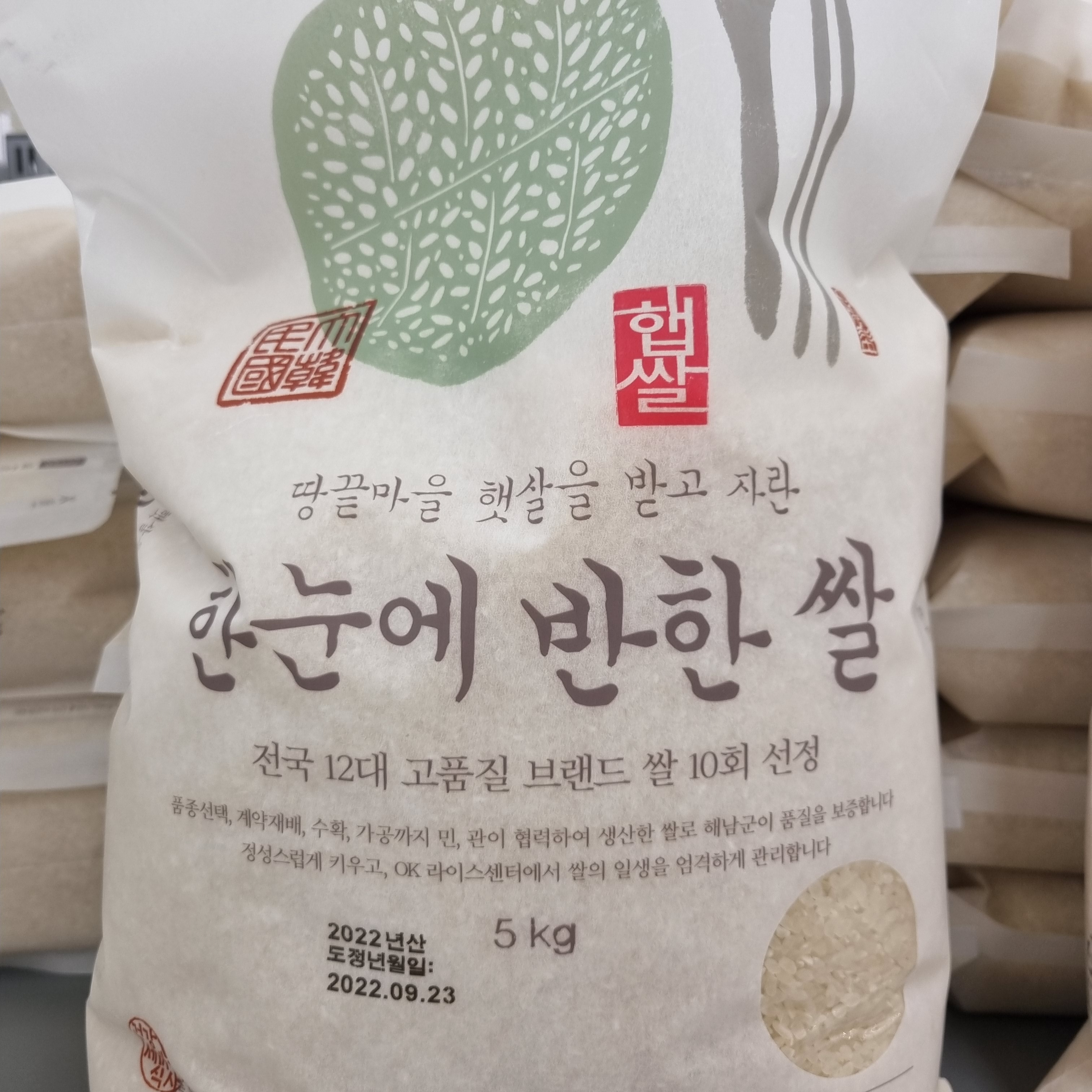
Falling in love at a glace rice(한눈에 반한 쌀)

==== Falling in love at a glance rice ====
Falling in love at a glance rice(한눈에 반한 쌀) is a glutinous rice produced in Haenam, Jeollanam-do. This rice is considered superior for making sushi.

This brand was awarded the grand prize in 2006, 2007, and in 2009 in the High-Quality Brand Rice Evaluation by the Korea Consumer Organization Council. It was for eight years selected for its excellence.

== Distribution and consumption ==
=== South Korea's Rice Exports ===
Korea's Rice Export (2019~2021)
	2019		2020		2021	
Country	weight (t)	amount of money ($1,000)	weight (t)	amount of money ($1,000)	weight (t)	amount of money ($1,000)
US	495	1,274	869	2,185	514	1,667
Australia	468	1,205	517	1,313	345	1,163
Singapore	181	345	204	424	93	263
Vietnam	63	155	131	247	97	229
UAE	73	167	53	149	62	215
Hong Kong	39	139	178	547	49	188
UK	24	76	61	173	69	186
Netherlands	29	131	20	61	41	153
Canada	32	93	100	249	52	152
Japan	34	96	17	57	34	123
Other countries	385	982	431	1,006	254	800
Sum	1,823	4,663	2,587	6,471	1,610	5,139

South Korea's major rice export markets are the United States, Australia, and Singapore, accounting for 60 percent of the total exports. As the demand for dining out increased due to the stabilization of COVID-19, the demand for Korean rice from overseas Korean markets such as the United States and Australia decreased.

The U.S. imports about 500 tons through Korean markets and Korean restaurants. The 2022 demand for Korean food consumption for rice processed foods increased due to the popularity of Korean culture.

Japan imports about 30 tons a year. As rice processed foods, demand for traditional liquor and Sikhye is increasing.

Vietnam imports about 97 tons of rice annually, and rice processed foods are increasing as entry into the Tteokbokki franchise expands.

=== Domestic rice consumption ===
==== Annual household consumption of rice per person ====
South Korea's rice consumption has been decreasing for 37 consecutive years since 1988. Rice consumption per capita in 2021 is 56.9%. This decreased by 1.4% (0.8 kg) compared to 2020.

The reason for the decrease in rice consumption is known to be due to changes in eating habits. This is due to a decline in the number of people who cook at home, and the spread of a culture of food deliveries and/ or frequent dining out. The Ministry of Agriculture, Food and Rural Affairs of South Korea considered that the extent of the decline in rice consumption in 2021 eased compared to the previous two years. In 2021 there was a 1.4% decrease i.e. less than the 3.0% decrease in 2019 and that of 2.5% in 2020. There are three reasons for this reduced decline. The first is the increase in demand for homemade meals due to the expansion of the home convenience market such as for soup and stew. The second reason is the increase in single-person households with relatively high rice consumption. The third reason is that after COVID-19, more people prefer home-cooked meals.

==== Corporate rice consumption ====
Rice consumption in the 2021 business sector totalled 680,000 tons, up 30,000 tons (4.6%↑) from 650,000 tons in 2020. In industry, demand for lunch boxes, noodles, rice cakes, and cooked food for meals increased by more than 10% compared to the previous year, and demand for sugar and liquor decreased slightly. In particular, the manufacturing of lunch boxes increased by 16% in 2021 compared to 2020, and the demand for cooked food such as instant rice has been steadily increasing over the three years 2019–2021.

Rice consumption (2017–2021)
Year	Per person in the household (kg)	In the company (t)
2017	61.8	708,000
2018	61.0	756,000
2019	59.2	744,000
2020	57.7	650,000
2021	56.9	680,000

=== Economic implications of rice ===
Rice is suitable for regions affected by seasonal wind, such as Korea, China, Japan, and Southeast Asia, and is one of the most productive crops per unit area. In a country with limited farmland like Korea, it is efficient for a large population to grow crops with high productivity on limited areas of land. Accordingly, rice has been linked to the lives of the Korean people as a staple food. The production, distribution, and consumption of rice have become the basis of the agricultural economy of South Korea.

In historical times, rice was used in place of money before money was commonly used. Barter involves difficulties in comparing the value of objects. To solve this problem, rice was conveniently used. There is a record that rice was used as a currency during the reign of King Soji of Silla. This shows that rice was used early as a currency during the period of Three Kingdoms of Korea.

After currency was created, the monetary function of rice generally gradually disappeared, but remained in rural areas. In the case of paying farm rent, between 1965 and 1981 the ratio of payment in rice was 70 to 94%, which greatly exceeded cash expenditure. Rice was a symbol of the wealth of farmers in the process of economic development.

Rice is South Korea's most important staple and accounts for a large portion of the nation's nutritional requirements. In addition, rice accounts for a high proportion of household expenses, so any rise in rice prices pressures household expenses for people living in cities. Such price rises act as a wage inflation pressure so as eventually to cause an increase in general prices. This has led to a government theory that ideally rice should not be too expensive or too cheap. If the price of rice is too high, people cannot buy it. If the price of rice is too low, it cannot guarantee the cost of living for farmers who grow rice.

== History of production ==
The most likely origin of Asian rice cultivated in Korea is the theory of the origin of Assam in northern India, and there are other theories of the origin of Yunnan in southern China and Southeast Asia. However, the recent excavation of rice seeds from the earthen layer of the Paleolithic Age in Sorori, Chungcheingbuk-do, Korea, has raised new interest in the origin of rice and its propagation route

Before ancient Koreans ate rice, they ate mixed grains as a staple food. As rice entered Korea through the north, it was actively grown in Yeongnam and Honam regions, which have favorable climatic conditions. Rice production in Baekje and Silla was high during the Three Kingdoms of Korea, and rice topped the list of staple foods, especially during the Unified Silla period. Rice in Korea is weak against falling and rice blasts, but it is resistant to cold and grows well even if there is insufficient water.

Rice cultivation became common in the Goryeo dynasty, during which period production was strengthened by the building of rice warehouses, improvement of cultivation methods, and expansion of agricultural areas. As the population increased and the preference for rice increased, production of rice became essential. During the Joseon dynasty, rice planting methods spread throughout the country, increasing the overall amount of rice production.

It is believed that the japonica or sinica variety was initially domesticated in the Yangtze Valley some 6,000–9,000 years ago, made its way into Korea, and eventually to Japan by farmers escaping regional conflicts during the Gojoseon era in the first millennia BCE.

By the late Joseon dynasty, there were about 1,500 varieties of rice in South Korea. Due to the policy of replacing the rainbow of diverse Korean varieties during the Japanese colonial era with its preference for short grain white japonica varieties, only 55 traditional cultivars remained by 1935.

The rice harvest in 1978 was smaller due to damage by blight, harmful insects and cold weather. South Korea was able to achieve substantial self-sufficiency in rice after the mid-1980s due to technology and the distribution of the locally developed hybrid strain of tongil rice, however the taste was bland and consumers associated it with poverty. As the economy began to prosper in 1990s, farmers returned to the japonica variety, which consumers associated with affluence since the colonial and post-war eras.

== Storage ==
=== Rice storage methods in South Korea ===
The Korea Rural Development Administration introduced a rice storage method that can reduce changes in the proper temperature so as to keep rice fresh.

Since rice reacts sensitively to the temperature, it should be stored in an appropriate way to reduce quality changes. If the temperature of the place where rice is stored is high, the fat content in the rice combines with oxygen in the air. This raises acidity, and causes bad smells so as to affect the taste of rice. In an experiment conducted by the Korea Rural Development Administration to examine changes in rice quality according to storage temperature, rice stored at 4 degrees Celsius was found to last the longest due to limited changes in rice taste, freshness, and color.

At home, it is recommended to store rice in an airtight container in the refrigerator. If this is not possible, it is recommended during the period October to April to store rice in a cool place where there is no sunlight and where the average temperature is under 15 degrees. If room temperature storage cannot be avoided in summer, it is better to purchase small amounts of rice and consume each as soon as possible. When humidity and temperature are high, microorganisms such as pests, fungi, and bacteria can occur, so rice should be stored in a cool place with low humidity. If the winter temperature drops below zero, rice may freeze, thereby introducing volume increase and subsequent cracking.

=== Public stockpiling system ===
There is in South Korea a government-run public storage system that stores a certain amount of food in case of food crises such as unstable grain supply and demand, natural disasters, and war. It reserves 17-18% of annual consumption, and buys from farmers at the national average rice price during the harvest season from October to December. In principle, the stockpile is supplied throughout the year via the military and government offices to circulate inventory. If supply and demand are unstable, stored rice is released to the market on short sale prices. Replacement of a certain quantity is required every year in order to prevent quality degradation and to ensure smooth inventory circulation.

Status of purchasing public reserve rice by year (Based on purchase price: 40 kg, Grade 1)
×	2014	2015	2016	2017	2018	2019	2020	2021	2022
purchase quantity(t)	370,000	360,000	360,000	340,000	340,000	340,000	320,000	340,000	450,000(planning)
purchase price(₩)	57,740	52,270	48,280	52,570	67,050	65,750	75,140	74,300	

== See also ==
- History of rice cultivation
- Oryza sativa
- Paddy fields in Korea
- Rice in Korean culture
- Rice production of Japan
- Wild rice
