= Chacra =

Type of farming property

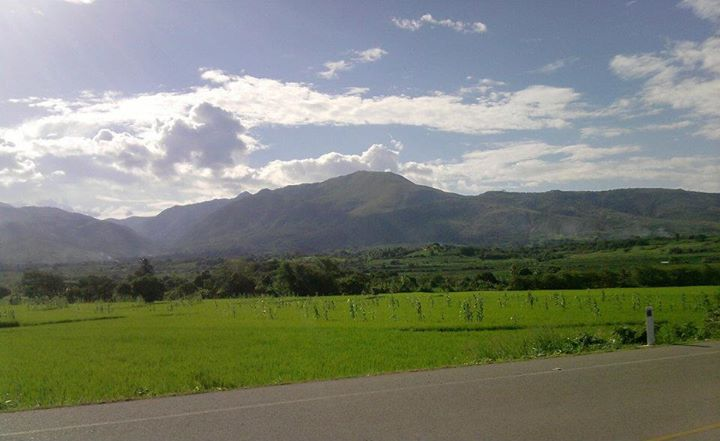
Cerro Shumba

Chacra is an Andean term (a loanword from the Quechua word chakra, meaning "farm, agricultural field, or land sown with seed"; Hispanicized spellings include chacra, chajra, and chagra) for a small garden or farm, often on the outskirts of a city, which produces food for the inhabitants of the city. The term is most commonly used to refer to farms located on ejidos (agricultural commons) in parts of Latin America. Chacras today are frequently used for horticulture as well.

The word has been borrowed into Portuguese as chácara and is commonly used in Brazil to refer to a small farm.
