= Rice riots of 1993 =

Food riots in Japan

The rice riots of 1993 were when Japan experienced a shortage of rice due to a record setting cold summer in 1993. Because of the commonly used phrase "Rice Riots of the Taisho Era" (referring to the Rice riots of 1918), this event is sometimes called the "Rice Riots of the Heisei Era", though no violent disturbances were involved.

The record cold summer seems to have been caused by the eruption of Mount Pinatubo in 1991. Summer temperatures were 2–3 degrees Celsius lower than average.

== Outline ==
This event refers to the historically bad rice yield in Japan due to poor weather in 1993 and the resulting chaos that occurred in both food stores as well as global markets.

This event was not only caused by the actual shortage of rice, but also the fact that consumers were concerned about it to the point where in some cases, rice disappeared from store shelves.

There was a heat wave in 1994 where the rice yields recovered and by the end of 1994, the situation had been resolved.
