= Xuanhua, Zhangjiakou =

Coordinates: 40°035′N 115°02′E

Xuanhua 宣化区 Suanhwa; Süanhwa
- District
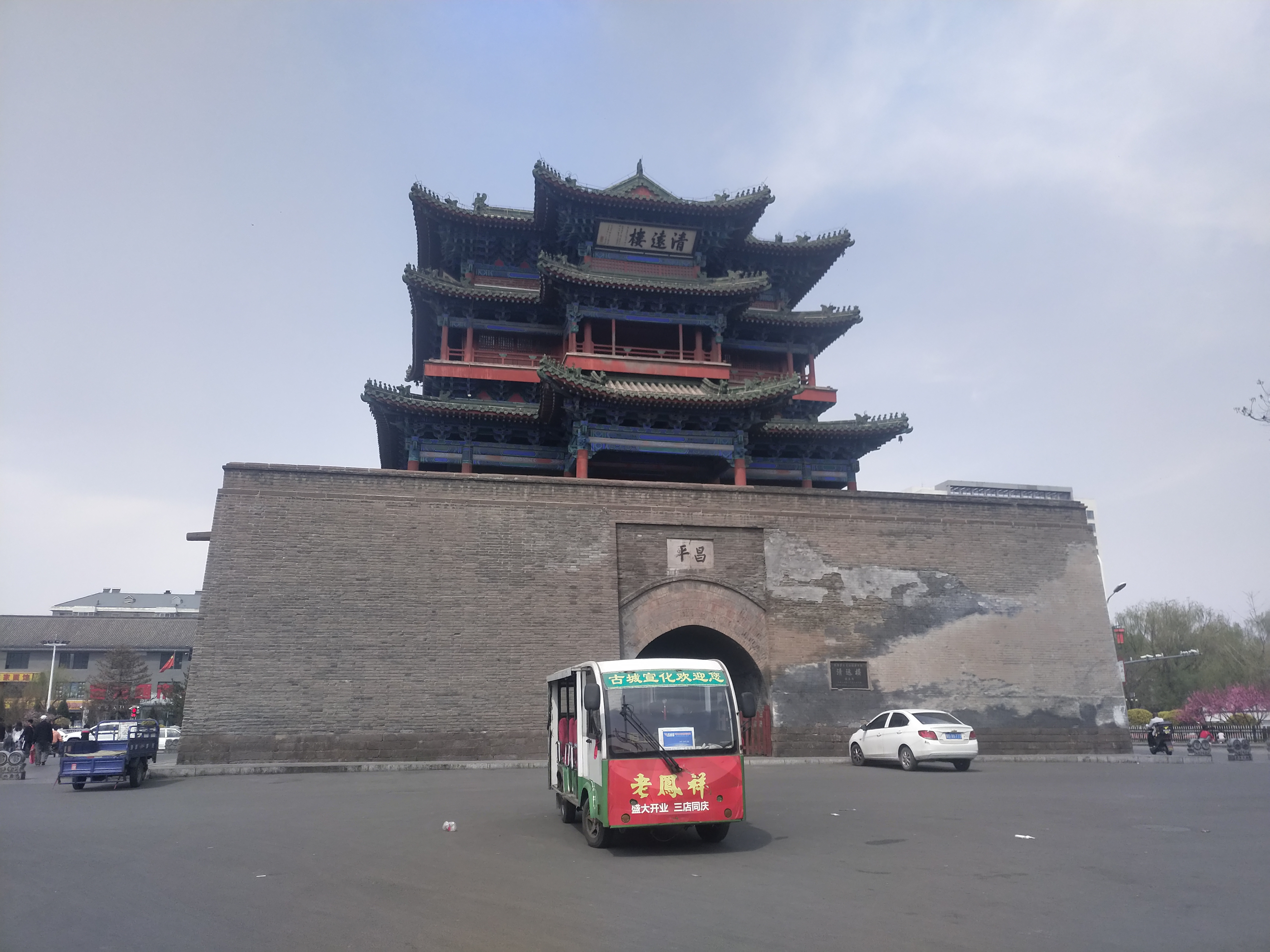
- Qingyuan Tower (Bell Tower)

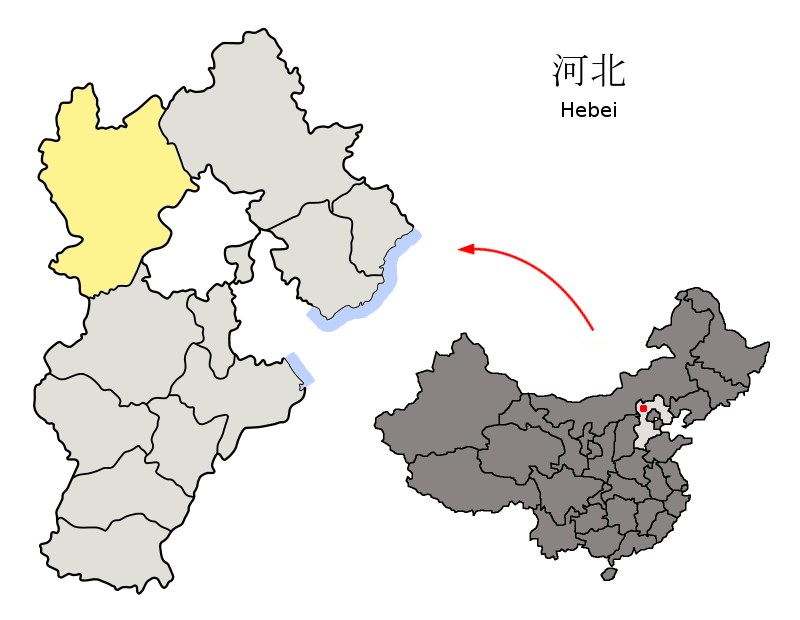
- Location of Zhangjiakou in Hebei
- Country: People's Republic of China
- Province: Hebei
- Prefecture-level city: Zhangjiakou
- Time zone: UTC+8 (China Standard)
- Website: www.zjkxuanhua.gov.cn

Xuanhua is an urban district of Zhangjiakou in northwestern Hebei Province, China.

Xuanhua is a very old city with a rich military and agricultural history. Xuanhua was historically the "Gateway to Beijing", which lies 180 km (112 mi) to its southeast. As a city with a large garrison close to the capital, it was strategically vital. It now has a population of 274,000 people. In modern times it has also become an industrial area, and now contains a high-tech development zone where new developments are being promoted by the government of Hebei Province.

== History ==
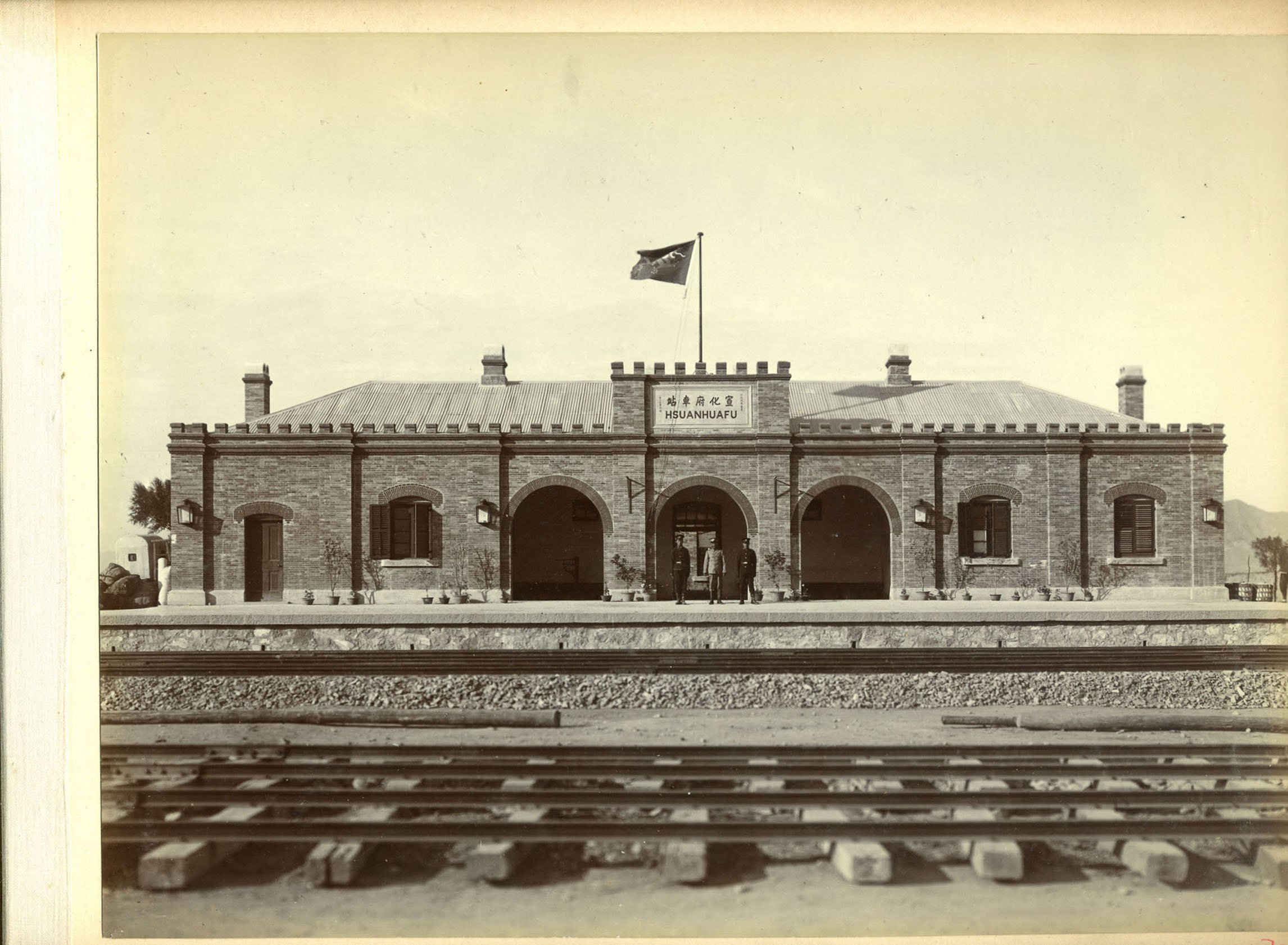
Xuanhua Railway Station, 1905

The remains of the Kingdom of Yan era city of Zaoyang (造陽) can be located in the northeast of Xuanhua District.

Xuanhua is home to a Liao (10th-12th c.) tomb with a colored star atlas painted with 268 stars including the sun, the moon, and the five planets Mercury, Venus, Mars, Jupiter, and Saturn.

In the late 14th century, prior to his elevation to emperor of the Ming Empire, Zhu Di ruled his principality of Yan from Xuanhua. Under the Qing, it continued to serve as the seat of a prefecture and was known to the Jesuit missionaries as "Suen-hao-fou".

In January 2016, the former rural Xuanhua County surrounding the urban Xuanhua merged with the urban Xuanhua District to established Greater Xuanhua District with both rural and urban area combined.

=== Military ===
Xuanhua was the garrison headquarters for the soldiers on the Xuanda-Shanxi Military Area, one of the three military governorships of the Great Wall in the Ming Dynasty. It commanded Xuanfu Zhen, Datong Zhen, and Shanxi Zhen along the Great Wall.

Xuanhua has a set of city walls built in the Ming Dynasty which are still partly intact.

== Agriculture ==
Known in ancient times as "The Grape Town," Xuanhua farmers grow a wide variety of grapes. Some grapes are used for wine production, but much of the crop is sold as fruit. In autumn, a large number of farmers sell grapes on streetsides out of hand-carts or trucks.

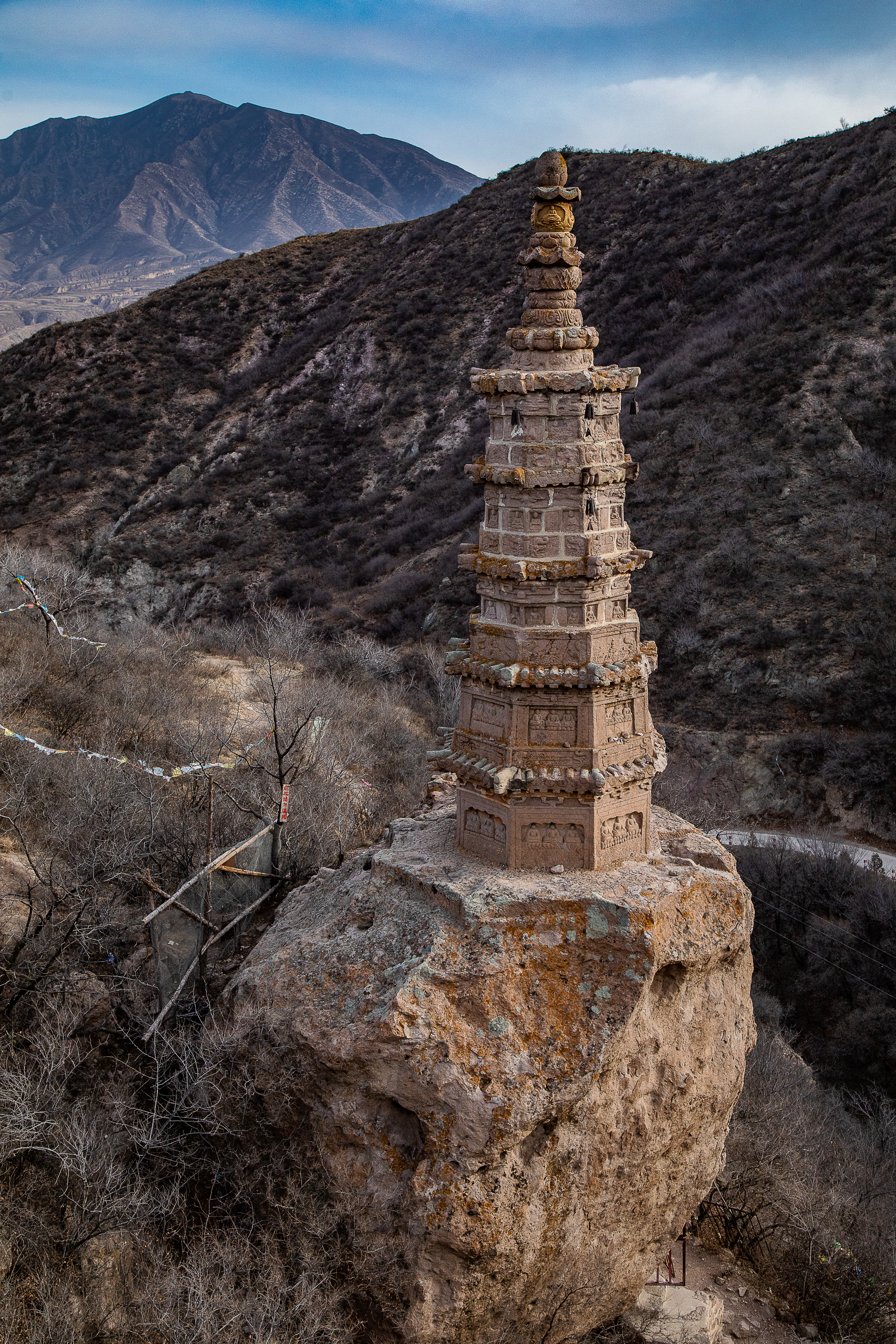
Bailin Temple, Xuanhua

== Industry ==
Xuanhua contains

- coal
- iron
- gold
- amargosite
- rich shale
- dolomite
- bentonite - Xuanhua has one of the largest deposits of bentonite in China.

and other mineral resources.

Its key industries are

- metallurgy
- machinery manufacturing
- chemical production
- electrical power generation
- papermaking
- woolskin tanning

and

- brewing - the locally produced beer is "Zhōnglóu Píjiǔ" (钟楼啤酒) or Bell-tower Beer.

== Administrative divisions ==
Subdistricts:

- Tianqinsi Subdistrict (天泰寺街道), Huangcheng Subdistrict (皇城街道), Nanguan Subdistrict (南关街道), Nanda Avenue Subdistrict (南大街街道), Dabei Avenue Subdistrict (大北街街道), Gongye Avenue Subdistrict (工业街街道), Jianguo Avenue Subdistrict (建国街街道)

Towns:

- Pangjiabu Town (庞家堡镇), Yanghenan Town (洋河南镇), Shenjing Town (深井镇), Guocun Town (崞村镇), Jiajiaying Town (贾家营镇), Gujiaying Town (顾家营镇), Zhaochuan Town (赵川镇)

Townships:

- Hezixi Township (河子西乡), Chunguang Township (春光乡), Houjiamiao Township (侯家庙乡), Wangjiawan Township (王家湾乡), Tarcun Township (塔儿村乡), Jiangjiatun Township (江家屯乡), Lijiabu Township (李家堡乡)

== Climate ==
Climate data for Xuanhua, elevation 629 m (2,064 ft), (1991–2020 normals, extremes 1981–2010)
Month	Jan	Feb	Mar	Apr	May	Jun	Jul	Aug	Sep	Oct	Nov	Dec	Year
Record high °C (°F)	9.8 (49.6)	17.9 (64.2)	26.5 (79.7)	34.1 (93.4)	38.4 (101.1)	39.0 (102.2)	41.2 (106.2)	36.5 (97.7)	36.1 (97.0)	29.2 (84.6)	20.0 (68.0)	14.9 (58.8)	41.2 (106.2)
Mean daily maximum °C (°F)	−1.9 (28.6)	3.0 (37.4)	10.4 (50.7)	19.1 (66.4)	25.7 (78.3)	29.2 (84.6)	29.8 (85.6)	28.7 (83.7)	24.2 (75.6)	16.6 (61.9)	6.8 (44.2)	−0.5 (31.1)	15.9 (60.7)
Daily mean °C (°F)	−9.6 (14.7)	−5.1 (22.8)	2.6 (36.7)	11.1 (52.0)	18.1 (64.6)	22.0 (71.6)	23.5 (74.3)	21.8 (71.2)	16.2 (61.2)	8.7 (47.7)	−0.6 (30.9)	−7.9 (17.8)	8.4 (47.1)
Mean daily minimum °C (°F)	−15.5 (4.1)	−11.4 (11.5)	−4.2 (24.4)	3.3 (37.9)	10.3 (50.5)	15.1 (59.2)	17.8 (64.0)	16.0 (60.8)	9.5 (49.1)	2.0 (35.6)	−6.2 (20.8)	−13.3 (8.1)	2.0 (35.5)
Record low °C (°F)	−28.2 (−18.8)	−25.1 (−13.2)	−23.7 (−10.7)	−9.0 (15.8)	−2.4 (27.7)	5.4 (41.7)	8.0 (46.4)	6.6 (43.9)	−1.6 (29.1)	−11.1 (12.0)	−20.9 (−5.6)	−24.6 (−12.3)	−28.2 (−18.8)
Average precipitation mm (inches)	1.4 (0.06)	2.5 (0.10)	7.7 (0.30)	16.9 (0.67)	32.9 (1.30)	67.3 (2.65)	91.9 (3.62)	68.8 (2.71)	56.3 (2.22)	23.0 (0.91)	8.3 (0.33)	1.7 (0.07)	378.7 (14.94)
Average precipitation days (≥ 0.1 mm)	1.6	2.3	3.6	4.9	7.5	10.8	12.5	10.4	8.9	5.4	2.9	1.9	72.7
Average snowy days	2.6	3.1	2.7	0.8	0	0	0	0	0	0.2	2.6	2.4	14.4
Average relative humidity (%)	49	43	41	38	41	55	71	73	68	59	55	51	54
Mean monthly sunshine hours	194.7	199.3	239.3	256.5	281.1	260.8	249.3	250.9	231.5	221.3	187.9	181.1	2,753.7
Percentage possible sunshine	65	66	64	64	63	58	55	60	63	65	64	63	63
Source: China Meteorological Administrationall-time May high
