= Siamese buffalo =

Breed of water buffalo

Krabue buffalo
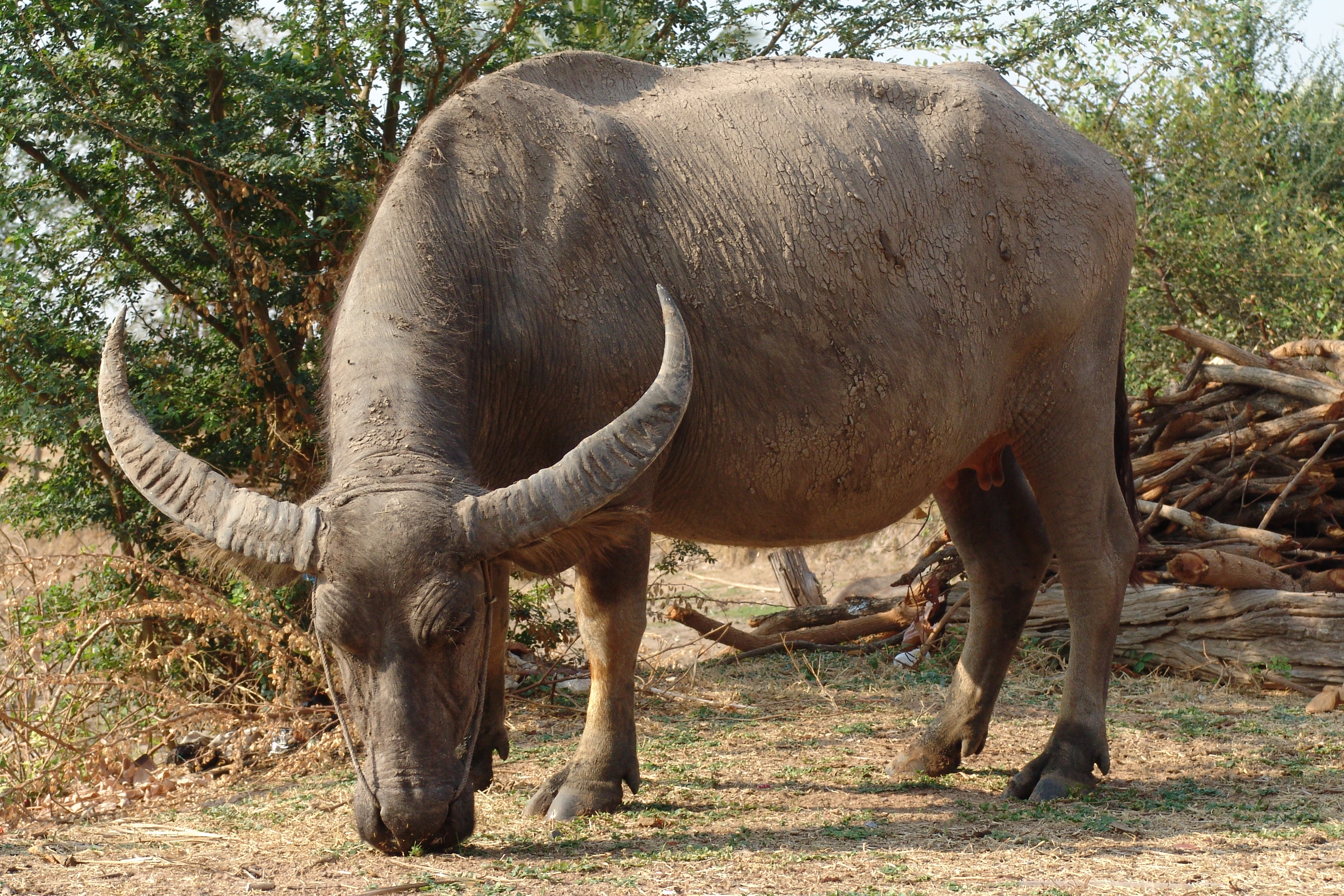
- Conservation status: not at risk
- Country of origin: Thailand
- Type: swamp
- Use: plowing, meat, milk

Traits
- Coat: black, brown, grey, albino

The Krabue buffalo (Thai: กระบือ; (krabue) being the Thai word for "water buffalo") also known as the Siamese buffalo, Thai water buffalo or Thai swamp buffalo is a large breed of water buffalo indigenous to Thailand.
