= Chunguang Township =

Chunguang Township 春光乡
- Rural Township
- Chūnguāng Xiāng
- Location in Hebei Location in China
- Coordinates: 40°36′26″N 115°02′16″E
- Country: People's Republic of China
- Province: Hebei
- Prefecture-level city: Zhangjiakou
- District: Xuanhua

Area
  - Total: 18.34 km^{2} (7.08 sq mi)

Population (2010)
  - Total: 11,752
  - Density: 640.9/km^{2} (1,660/sq mi)
- Time zone: UTC+8 (China Standard)

Chunguang Township (Chinese: 春光乡; pinyin: Chūnguāng Xiāng) is a rural township located in Xuanhua District, Zhangjiakou, Hebei, China. According to the 2010 census, Chunguang Township had a population of 11,752, including 5,933 males and 5,819 females. The population was distributed as follows: 1,791 people aged under 14, 8,996 people aged between 15 and 64, and 965 people aged over 65.

== See also ==
- List of township-level divisions of Hebei
