= Rice in Korean culture =

Rice forms an important part of Korean economy and culture. Koreans have been eating rice for a long time, and it is one of the ingredients that should not be missed at meals. Therefore, there are many kinds of rice dishes, there are many local festivals related to rice, and there are many proverbs related to rice.

== Korean rice products ==
Korean Rice Processing Products(Korea Rice Processing Food Association, 2009)
Product		category criteria
large category	small category	category criteria
Rice cake noodles	Instant rice cake noodles	Instant food such as tteokguk tteok, tteokbokki tteok, noodles, ramen, etc. that can be cooked on the spot
Rice cake noodles	Rice cake noodles	Rice cake, noodles, raw noodles, etc
Rice cake noodles	Traditional rice cakes	Traditional rice cakes such as Injeolmi and Jeolpyeon
Rice crackers	Rice crackers	Rice snacks such as biscuits, hard bread, snacks, etc
Rice crackers	Fried rice	Rice crackers with simple puffed rice
Rice crackers	Korean sweets	Korean traditional confectionery products such as rice gangjeong, Yugwa, etc
Rice crackers	Nurungji	Nurungji and Nurungji-type snacks
Rice flour	raw rice flour	Dry-grained rice product
Rice flour	Alpha rice flour	Alpha rice flour, broad grain, extruder rice powder, fried rice, etc., which is a form of rich ingredients for rice
Rice flour	wet rice flour	Rice flour products that have been wet ground through processes such as dipping processes
Alcohol	Soju	Soju products
Alcohol	Cheongju	Cheongju products
Alcohol	Takyakju	Takju and Yakju products
Alcohol	Beer	Beer products
Seasoning food	Yeot type	Yeot and grain syrup products
Seasoning food	Soy sauce type	Red pepper paste, soybean paste, and soy sauce products
Seasoning food	Vinegar	Vinegar products
Etc	Porridge	Porridge products
Etc	Sikhye	Sikhye food
Etc	Rrocessed rice	Aseptic packed rice, retort packed rice, frozen rice, dried rice, cup rice
Etc	Skewers	Rice products on skewers
Etc	Rice drink	Rice drink product
Etc	Rice bread	Bread products

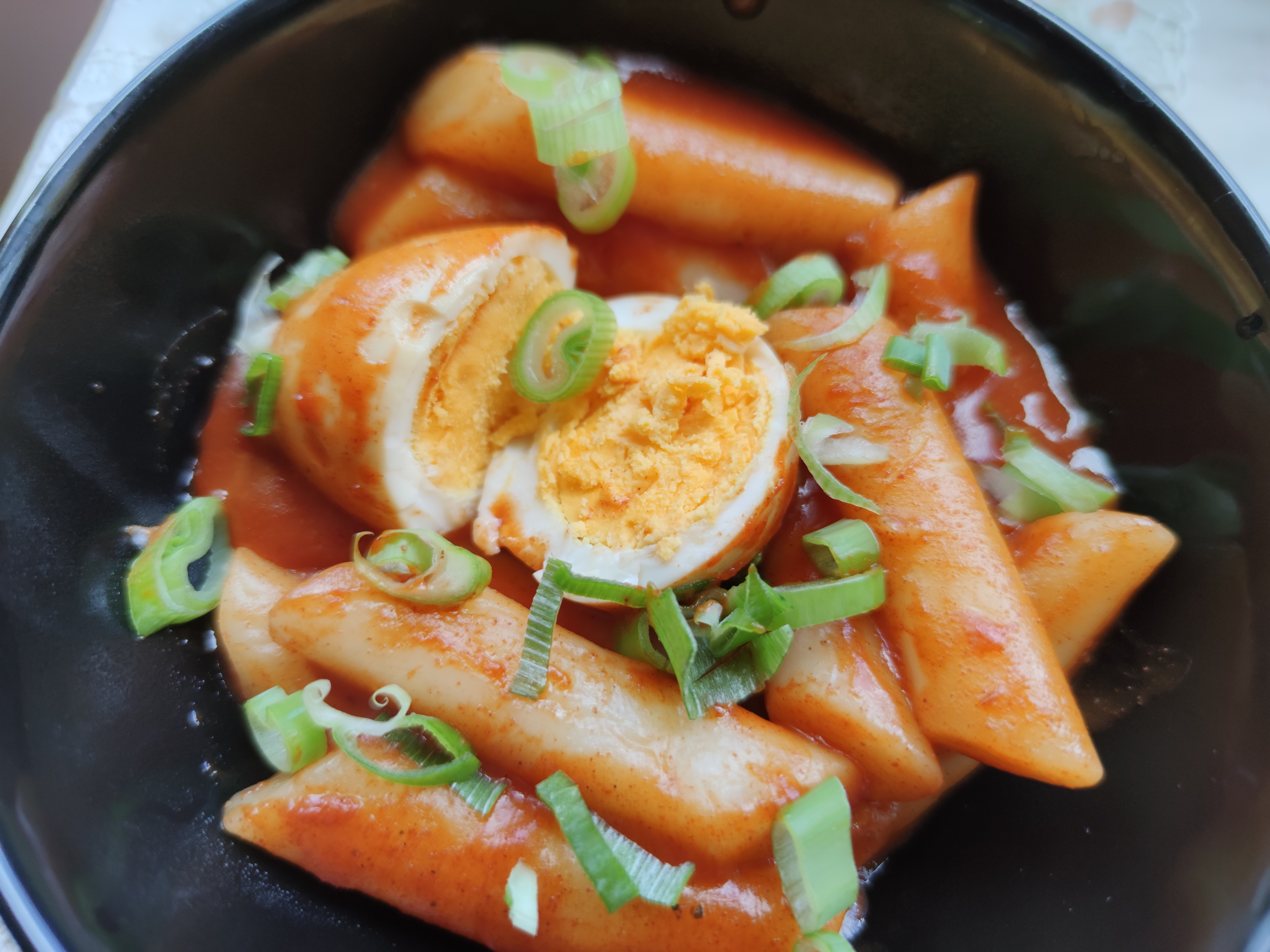
Tteokbokki

Tteokbokki

Tteokbokki is a Korean dish made by frying or boiling rice cakes and ingredients in seasoning. Rice cake, the main ingredient, is made of rice or wheat. It is one of Korea's representative national snacks and representative street food. It ranked 10th on the Korean food list and is the most popular Korean snack.

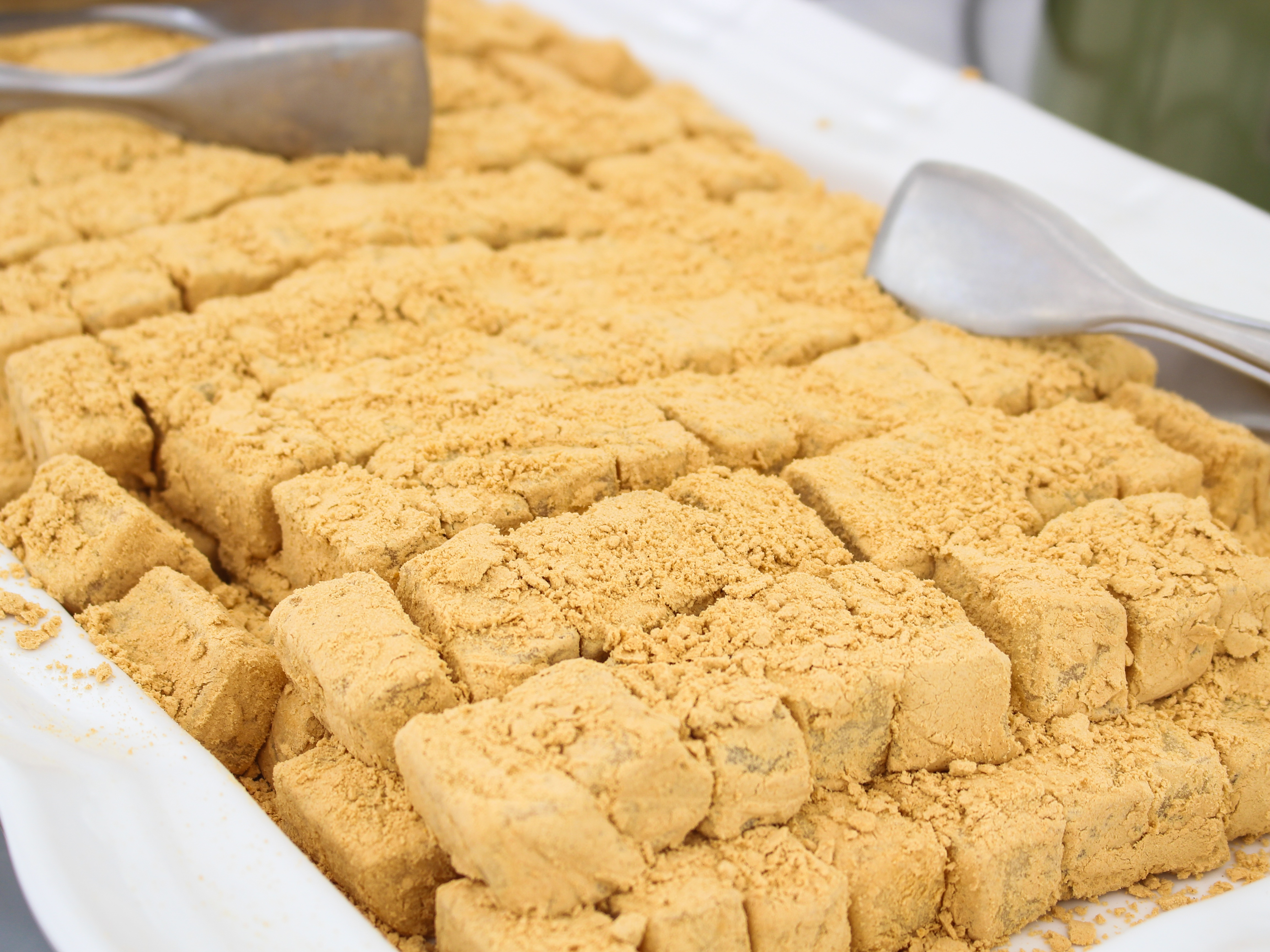
Injeolmi

Injeolmi

Injeolmi is a rice cake in which rice flour is steamed with a steamer, pounded with a mortar, cut into appropriate sizes, and coated with bean powder. It is a popular rice cake that is served without omission from the table of ancestral rites and feasts, and it is digestible and high in calories. Surprisingly, it is one of the most popular rice cakes among foreigners. In general, while foreigners perceive the texture of rice cake as a strange food that is tough and doesn't taste much, injeolmi is less burdensome to chew just the size of finger food, and there is an image that it is healthy thanks to its unique savory and subtle sweetness.

Nurungji

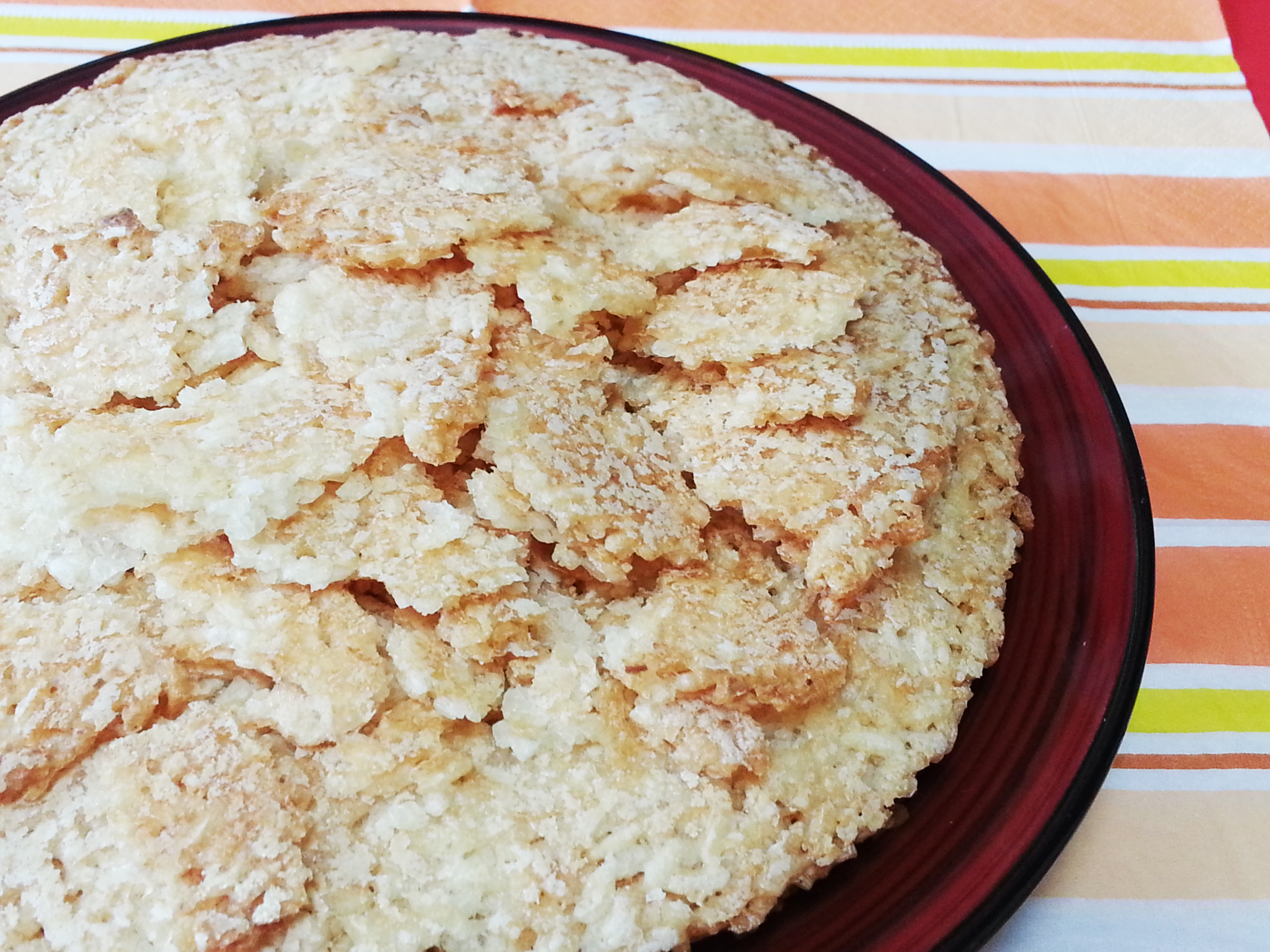
Nurungji

Nurungji is grilled rice stuck to the bottom of the cauldron. Nurungji can be intentionally baked in a frying pan. In the days when electric rice pots were used before, they were distributed, nurungji was always created every time rice was cooked, so it was used for various purposes. Usually, it is common to make Sungnyung by boiling water in scorched rice in a cauldron, and there were cases where it was used in dishes such as scorched rice soup, dried, stored, and eaten like snacks. When there were no snacks, nurungji was the main snack for children.

Juk

Juk is a food that boiled rice. In Korea, people usually eat it as a substitute for meals when they have dental-related diseases or have a cold. A dead dish made only of rice is incredibly simple. Just soak the rice in water or grind it into a pot and it's done. Vegetables, seafood, and meat are chopped little by little and eaten.

Sikhye

Sikhye is one of Korea's traditional drinks, and it is a grain drink made by marinating malt and rice together. In Korea, it is mainly drunk on holidays such as Chuseok and New Year's Day, and it is widely loved as a beverage in everyday life, so it is easy to find it made at home or sold in cans or plastic bottles. It is a popular drink that can be enjoyed by men and women of all ages due to the combination of the savory aroma and sweetness of grain, and it is also a delicacy to scoop up rice that has sunk on the floor after drinking it.

== Idioms ==
Sharing rice is like sharing property or life, so the "spirit of sharing that Koreans have" was achieved through the rice. In Korea, there is also a saying, "Rice poison makes you feel generous".

== Rice as Collectivist Culture ==
Traditionally Korea has long been known as a collectivist culture, placing a focus on the group rather than the individual. Writing in the Korea Times, academic and cultural critic David Tizzard has suggested that a history of rice production might have contributed to the creation of this culture: "Rice, unlike wheat or other crops, is labor-intensive, requiring the synchronized effort of entire communities. It’s a process that ties people together, necessitating cooperation, mutual reliance, and collective labor. The argument is that the demands of rice farming have fostered a culture of collectivism in societies where rice is a staple crop."

== Festivals ==
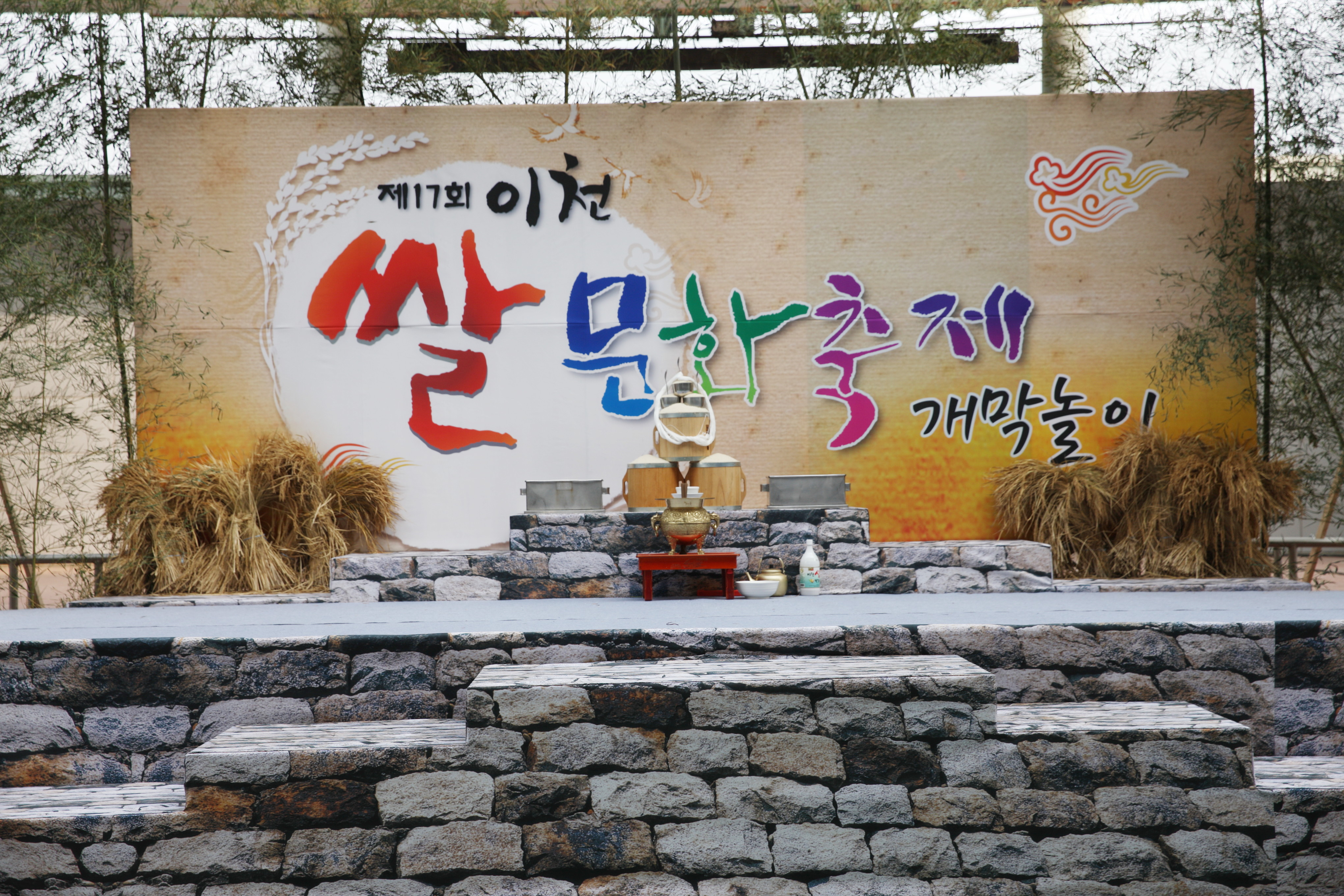
Icheon rice festival

- Icheon Rice Culture Festival is a local festival organized by Icheon City, Korea. Icheon is known as an area with excellent rice cultivation geographically, and Icheon rice is famous for its good taste, so it is held every fall to promote the excellence and taste of Icheon rice.
- Jincheon Rice Festival is a festival held in October in Jincheon, Chungcheongbuk-do. It induces direct transactions between consumer producers of local agricultural products such as rice and promotes the image of Jincheon.
- Dangjin Rice Festival consists of a festival program based on various foods using rice, such as rice applications and rice processed foods, shows everything about rice, such as traditional play experience, rice farming experience, and rice processed food experience, and a direct market for agricultural products in Dangjin is also open. In addition, you can enjoy differentiated tourism in connection with nearby tourist attractions.

== See also ==
- Rice production in South Korea
