= Andean agriculture =

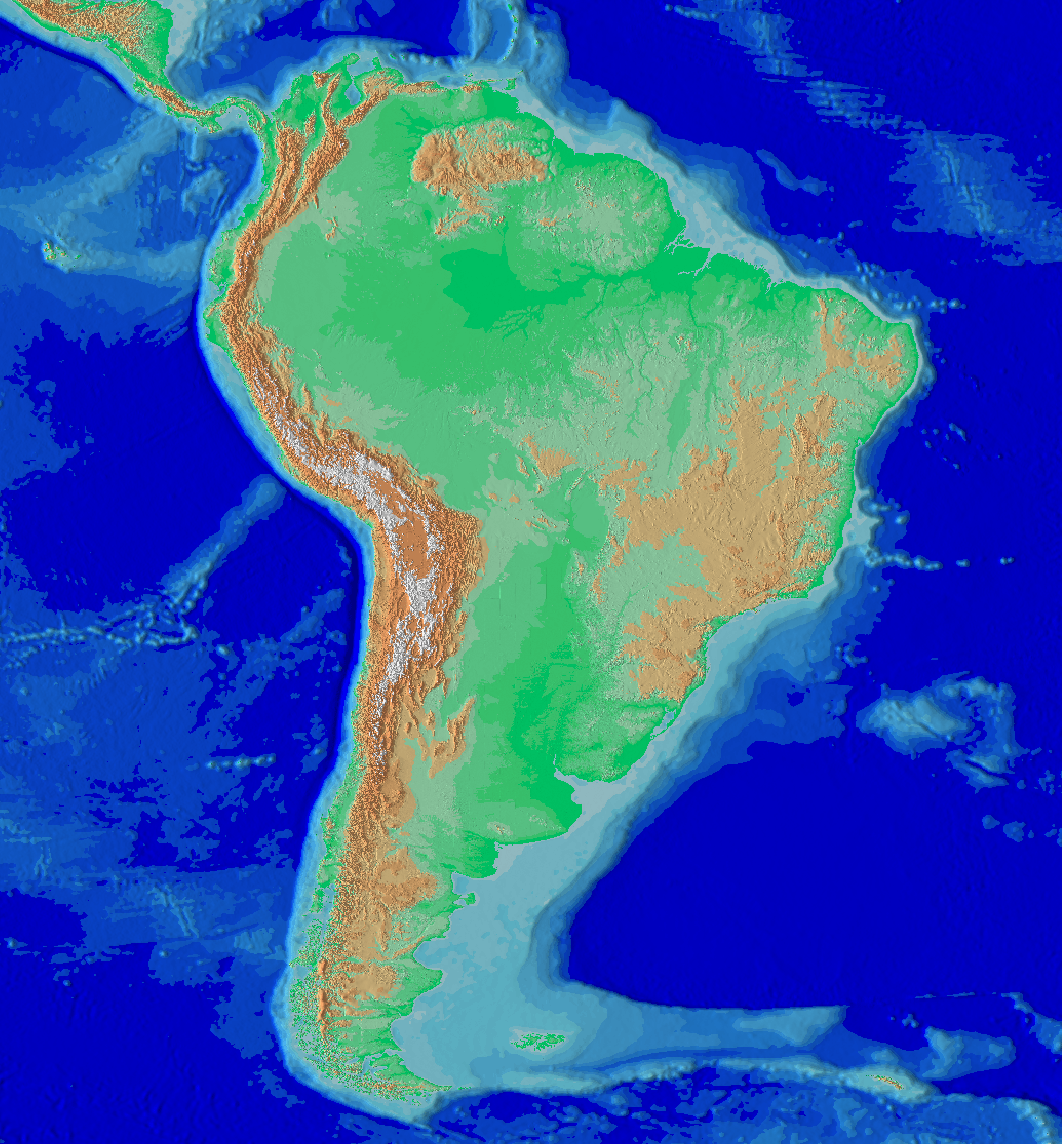
Map of the Andean region of South America

Current agricultural practices of the Andean region of South America typically involve a synthesis of traditional Incan practices and modern techniques to deal with the unique terrain and climatic elements of the area. Millions of farmers in economically impoverished communities make a living producing staple crops such as potato, olluco, and mashua for their own consumption as well as profit in local and urban markets. The Andean region is particularly known for its wide variety of potato species, boasting over about 5,000 varieties identified by the International Potato Center based in Peru. These crops are arranged within the mountains and plateaus of the Andes in four distinct landscape-based units described as Hill, Ox Area, Early Planting, and Valley which overlap one another in a patchwork-styles of plateau surfaces, steep slopes, and wetland patches. Within each of these units, farmers classify soil types as either puna (deep soils) or suni (thin, slope soils) (local names may vary per region).

Andean farmers must contend with the severe fluctuations in temperature, the unpredictability of the rainy season, and a multitude of pest threats on the daily. To cope with such challenges, many farmers try protect their crops by cultivating a diverse array of species rather than a monoculture. Communities engage in many cultural and faith-based practices to ensure a good harvest and season. They highly value ancestral wisdom and call on it often for agricultural and social endeavors. Many farmers still use Incan-style terraces and irrigation systems for cultivation.

== Tools and crops ==
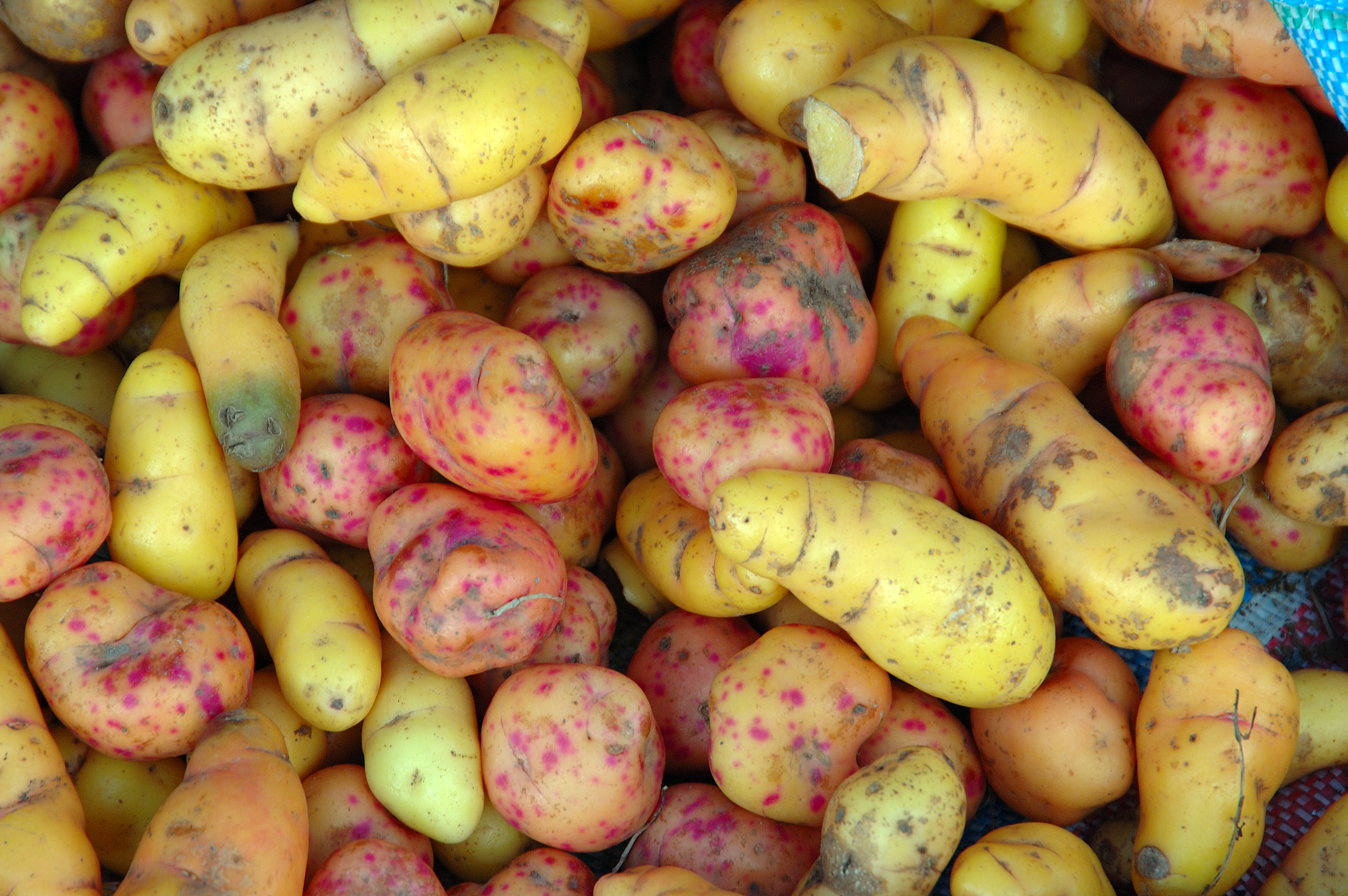
Ulluco: Common crop of the Andean region

As one of the major cradles of agriculture, the Andean region, has many indigenous crop species which have persisted and diversified for generations.

Tools include the Chaki taklla (Chakitaqlla), a modified stick tool used for tilling, adapted to manage a variety of soil and terrain types.

Crops include:

- Maize
- Quinoa (Chenopodium quinoa)
- Amaranth
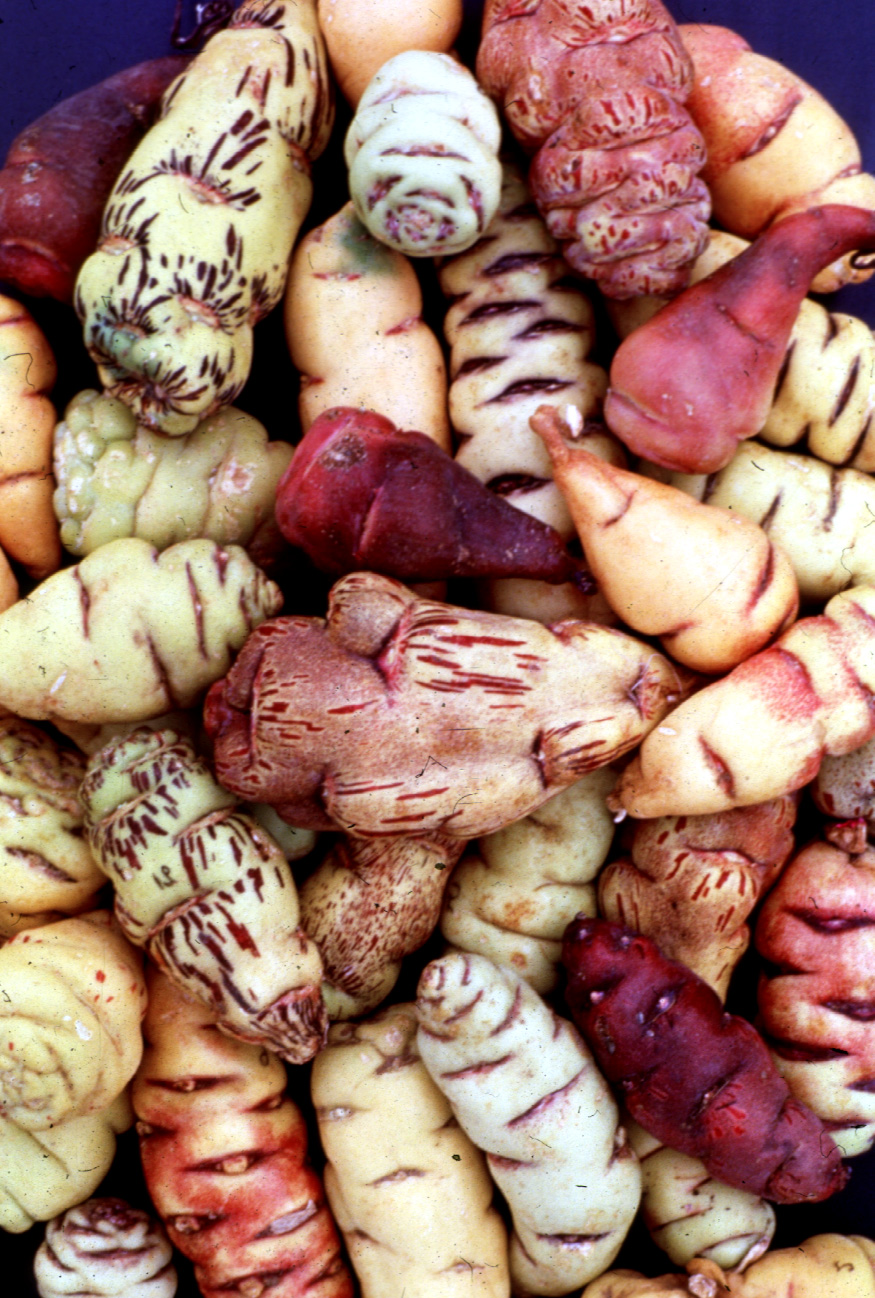
  Mashua tubers
- Potato
  - Solanum ajanhuiri
  - S. chaucha
  - S. juzepzucki
  - S. phureja
  - S. stenotomum
  - S. tuberosum
- Oca (Oxalis tuberosa)
- Olluco (Ullucus tuberosus)
- Mashua (Tropaeolum tuberosum)
- Yacon (Smallanthus sonchifolius)
- Coca (Family: Erythroxylaceae)

== Environmental conditions ==
The Andean region holds many extreme and variable environmental conditions that challenge farmers of the region. From pests, frosts, variable rainy seasons, and changes to soil conditions farmers have a lot to contend with. Of these, frosts are considered to hold the largest environmental threat, with pests coming in close second. Some of the most threatening pests include:

- Potato Blanch or Late Blight/ "Rancha" (Phytophthora infestans)
- Andean potato weevil/ "gorgojo de los Andeas" (Premnotrypes spp.)

Late rainy seasons also usually precipitate a decrease in pond and soil humidity, and increase in soil erosion and fertility.

To combat some of these risks, farmers typically turn to syncretic mixes of traditional and modern practices. For mitigating effects of frosts, farmers utilize Incan-designed terraces which break up the cold air coming down from the mountains. The stones of the terraces also absorb heat during the day, retaining it at night and keeping the soil above frost temperatures. Other benefits include decreased soil erosion, organized irrigation systems, and humidity maintenance. Irrigation systems, besides delivering water in typically arid fields, also keeps some of the warmth accumulated throughout the day and adds an extra layer of protection around younger crops with tender roots. Though these structures work to mitigate some of the threats, others such as pests, hailstorms, heavy rainfall, or severe droughts are less preventable and could destroy the entire harvest in a given season. As a response, many farmers choose to procure seed from further distanced communities to introduce variety to the cultivated crops in a hope that some will be more resilient in the event of a severe environmental concern. Other protective strategies include intercropping, production of livestock manure, regulated slash and burn, and grazing land management

=== Effects of climate change ===
Within the past century, there have been important changes in the climate of the Andean region attributed to climate change. Precipitation has decreased, and due to the Anden region's already arid climate, this decrease in precipitation has led to increasing droughts. Run off from the mountains have also shown relevant decreasing trends in the early part of the last century with increases between 1960 and 1985. Surface air temperatures of the area have increased 2.8 degrees Celsius marked with various cooling patterns. Though these are general trend of the region, different areas are contending with the changes in a variety of ways from reaching out the ancestors to adopting more modern practices to contend with the shifts and anywhere in between.

== Cultural practices ==
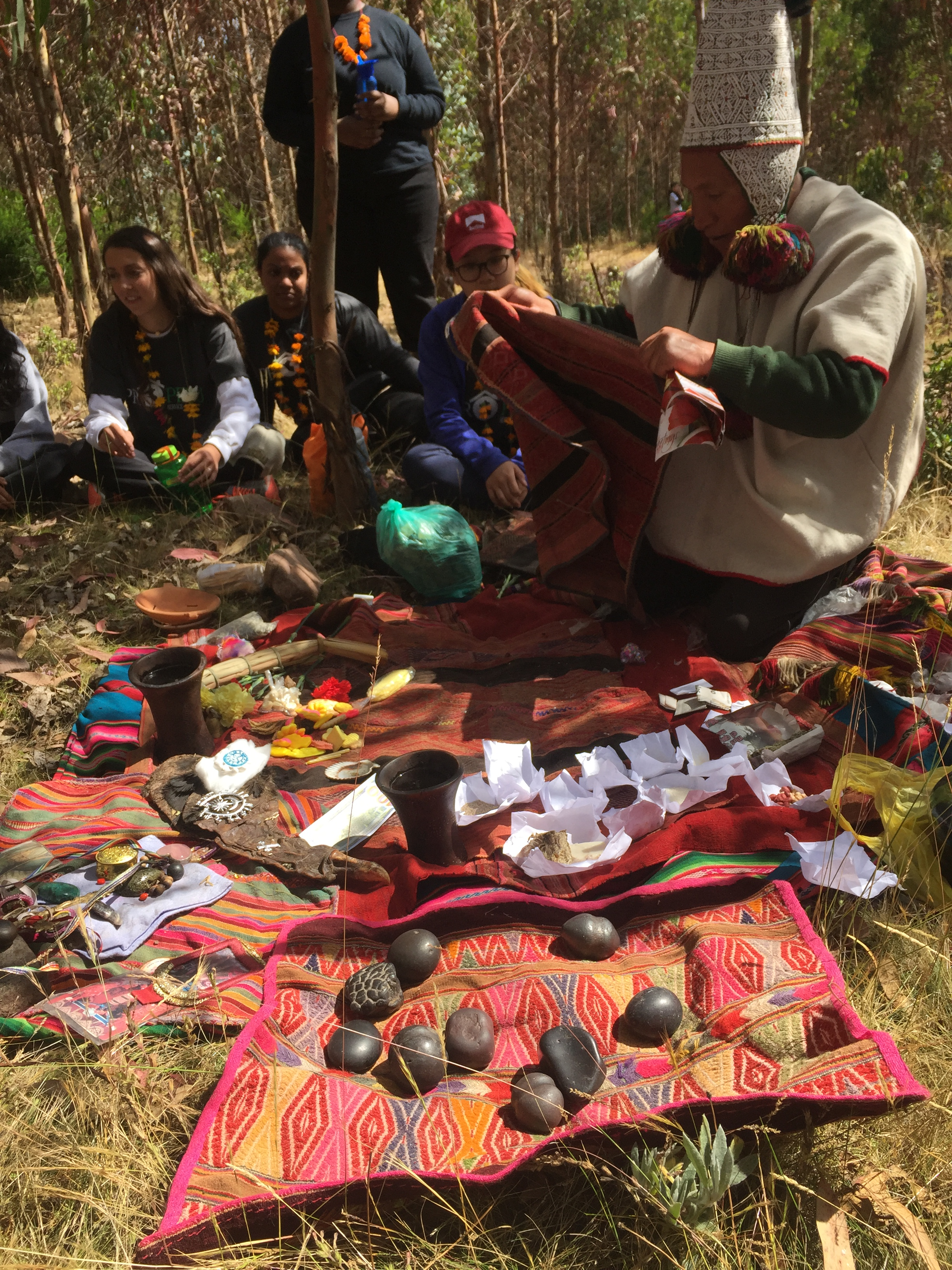
Pacha Mama Ceremony

Farming in the Andean region is a highly collective activity that is deeply enriched by a spiritual reverence of the land (Pacha Mama) who is viewed as a living, breathing entity who must be dealt with respect and dignity. Therefore, people organize many different rituals and ceremonies during the season to pay reverence to her. These rituals may include praying for a good harvest, thanking the Earth for her many blessings, blessing a field before planting, or predicting an environmental threat. All of this is typically done in the native language of Quechua or Quichua (depending on the area). In Quecha, the Andean people call themselves runa cuna loosely translating to people of the land (Pacha Mama). There is a strong sense of belonging within the community which is transmitted through generations as well as an integral idea of mutual help (yanamanchi).

=== Rituals ===
Rituals:

- Alpata Garapashun/Allpa Pagamanchi: Ritual to feed Mother Earth (Pacha Mama)
- Jircat Garaicushun/ Cerrugpag Ofrendapag: Offering to the Mountain
- Observaman: Astronomic reading
- Senalcuna Plantacuna/ Animalcuna Manuchusheque Climangpag: Predicting climate through the use of animals and plants as learned signals

== Role of the community ==
The community plays a large role in the life of Andean farmers. Much of the farm labor is split among the community especially during harvest time. They also play a role in storing and passing along ancestral knowledge regarding agriculture of the region. Most of the farmers were taught all they needed to know through their families or other kin in the community. There is also reliance on outside communities networks and systems of seed sharing, farm labor delegation, and selling of surplus crops.

=== Seed procurement and dispersal ===
Seed procurement and dispersal are essential components of Andean farmer's lives as it effects their spatial, environmental, and social spheres. In spatial terms, seed procurement affects the physical organization of farmland dictating where specific crops are cultivated. Specific varieties of tubers do well at differing altitudes, thus necessitating spatial planning depending on which species of seeds are available. In environmental terms, seed flow within and between communities has a causal effect on adaptations of specific crop varieties as well the mineral composition of cultivated land. Farmers also make use of locally domesticated species (traditional landraces) as well as highly regulated internationally domesticated species (cultivar strains) depending availability and cost. Lastly, many of the upper Andean communities have strict gender roles which dictate who is responsible for seed procurement withinin the community as well as outside of it. Beside gender roles, there are also complex systems of seed procurement between neighboring communities, with large seed fair being set up in common spaces for easy trade.

Seed management in the Andean region is viewed as a household or community-wide endeavor. Generally speaking, seed are procured from outside of the community during initial stages and sourcing, and self-provisioned during regular seasonal planting. The four distinct landscape styles of Hill, Ox Area, Early Planting, and Valley all cover a broad range of agroecological habitats with varying methods of seed procurement. Within Hill units seeds are largely procured from other the farmer's own household or other local hill units since it spans many different environmental niches. This means that the seeds are grown in, sourced, and dispersed among hill units to other hill units within the area. To add variety as well, a percentage of the seeds are sourced from distanced communities. Within the Ox Area, seeds are also largely procured from farmer's own household as well as from outside units within the community. More so than in Hill units, farmers mix cultivars and traditional land races. These cultivars are purchased through development institutions within nearby urban centers. The Early Planting units are a bit more difficult for seed procurement and cultivation since they have year-round humidity. This kind of humidity is not conducive to seed production, therefore it is not common for seeds to come from the same unit or household. Most of the seeds are procured from other units (i.e. Hill or Ox Area) from neighboring communities, with a large percentage coming from the development institutions which specialize in cultivars.

==== Gendered dynamics ====
The gender dynamics concerning seed procurement within communities typically vary between type of farm unit (Hill, Ox Area, Early Planting, or Valley) and also depend on if trading and purchasing happens within the community, neighboring communities, or outside of the area. Within the Hill unit women and men have similar levels of involvement in extracommunity trading and procurement whereas women who participate in the Ox Area Unit procure the seeds from local sources, while men procure them from outside of the community. On the whole, women are more likely to be involved in procurement within the community, equally likely to be involved within extracommunity procurement, and less likely to procure from development institutions in urban centers.

== Effects of the Green Revolution and modernization ==
The Green Revolution that occurred between the 1930s and 1960s had lasting impact on the technology and culture of the agricultural world, the Andean region being no exception. With this "revolution" came a widespread use of fertilizers, pesticides, and internationally recognized cultivars which all contributed to emphasis on high-yields from each crop cycle. High-yield monoculture farms often receive financial advantages. These high-yield varieties were first introduced to the Andean region in the early 1950s and can now be found throughout the highlands and even among some of the more remote communities. Some of the countries within the Andean region even offer reduced subsidies to farmers who adopt modern or Green-Revolution style agricultural practices, thus incentivizing this sort of farming. However, when smaller, traditional farms who consume much of their own crop convert to monocultures, they typically see a decrease in financial return as a result of having to spend more money on outside sustenance rather than just from what they can grow within their own fields.

=== Seed networks ===
In post-green revolution practices, farmers are encouraged to adapt their own domesticated strains for the particular environmental unit in which they cultivate. However, this intense localized domestication based on environmental niches is not conducive to the climatic fluctuations of the Andean region, thus why most farmers also rely on extracommunity strains procured through seed fairs and markets within neighboring and distanced communities. This is a traditional practice that ensures that variety is retained within the traditional landraces. Limiting specialization in this case, contrary to the culture of the Green Revolution, produces more variety and higher-yields rather than relying on a single domesticated species, thus creating tensions between the priorities of post-green revolution agriculture and traditional agricultural practices of the region.

=== Environmental niches ===
Practices instilled during the Green Revolution emphasizing high yields also had effects on the landscape of agriculture. In producing a high yield of a single crop, farmers began to cultivate land that would be optimal for a single kind of crop rather than a variety creating monocultures. Within the Andean region, the Ox Area unit typically traverses less environmental niches and is thus better suited for monoculture production as opposed to polyculture. Thus, due to the Green Revolution, the Andean region saw a decrease in cultivated hill fields and an expansion of Ox Area units.

=== Indirect ecological effects ===
Changes in farming unit types within the Andean region has also had indirect effects on downstream ecosystems. Specifically within Colombia, with the expansion of Ox Area units causing deforestation, over 63% of the land cover has been replaced by agriculture indirectly increasing the concentration of NH3-N in the water as well as sedimentation. The increase in nitrogen is attributed to run off from fertilizers, nitrogen fixing crops, and animal waste. High levels of NH3-N can be highly toxic to water ecosystems and pose a risk to the biota within these streams.

== Conservation efforts ==
=== In situ conservation ===
Around the end of 1980s early 1990s multiple in situ conservation efforts were initiated. Some of these efforts include cultivating high variation within crops as well as specialized production managements that reflect the specific ecological and environmental floors of the various farm units.

=== Participatory plant breeding ===
Participatory plant breeding is a collaborative process in which farmers, marketers, processors, consumers and policy makers all get a say in the plant breeding program. With this strategy, farmers can input local knowledge of soil and rainfall patterns to account for these factors when cultivating variety breeds. This kind of plant breeding is being instilled in particular areas within the Andean region to combat some of the negative effects of Green Revolution practices. Many of these efforts rely on climate-soil zonation to organize zones of testing. However, in the case of Andean farmers, most farm unit span many different climate-soil zones, and thus methods solely reliant on this zonation are not practical for farmers of the area. Efforts are being made to create Participatory plant breeding programs that do not rely on climate-soil zonation as a result.

== See also ==
- Vertical archipelago
- Food security
