= Rice production in Japan =

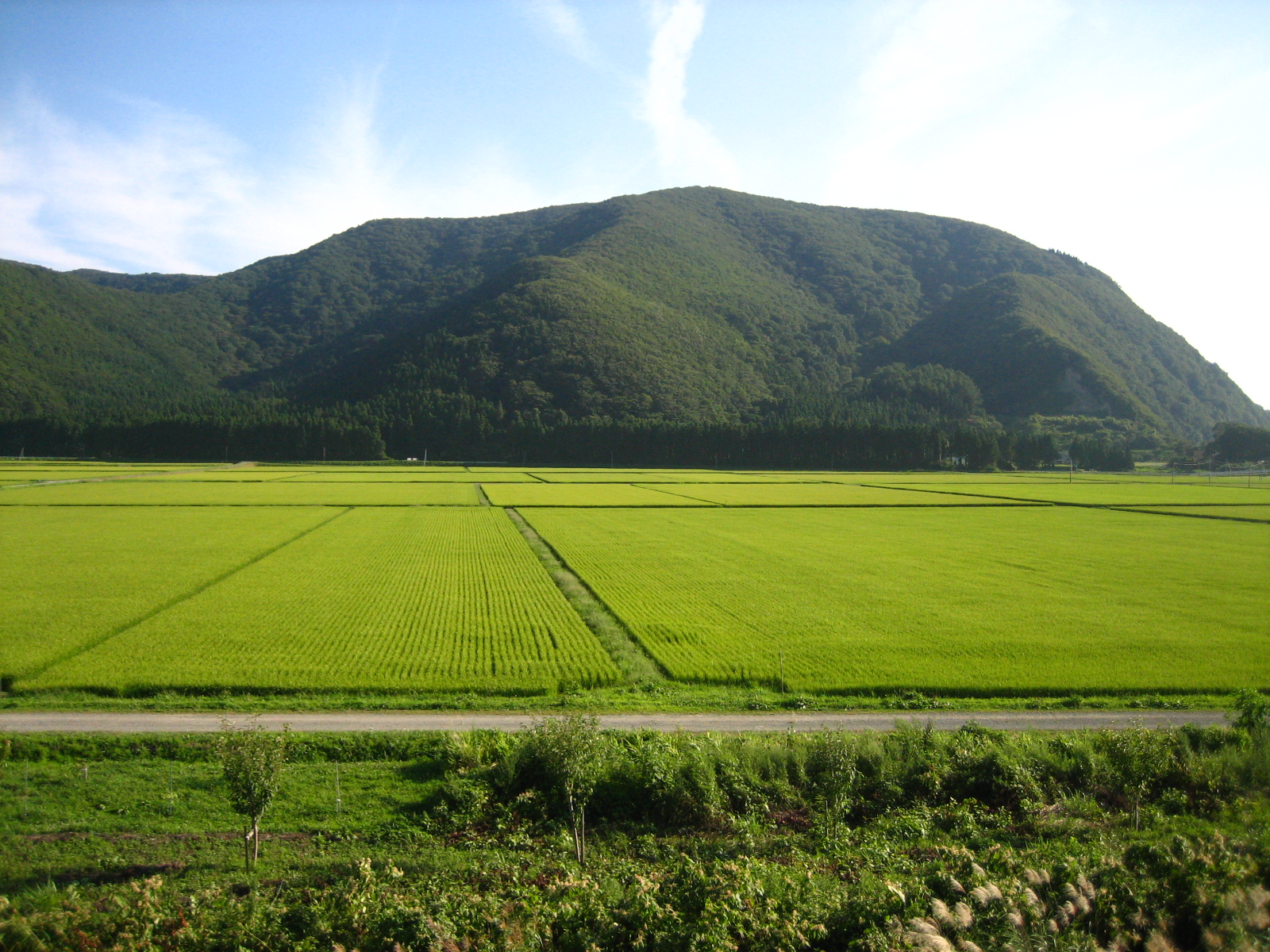
Rice paddies in Aizu, Fukushima

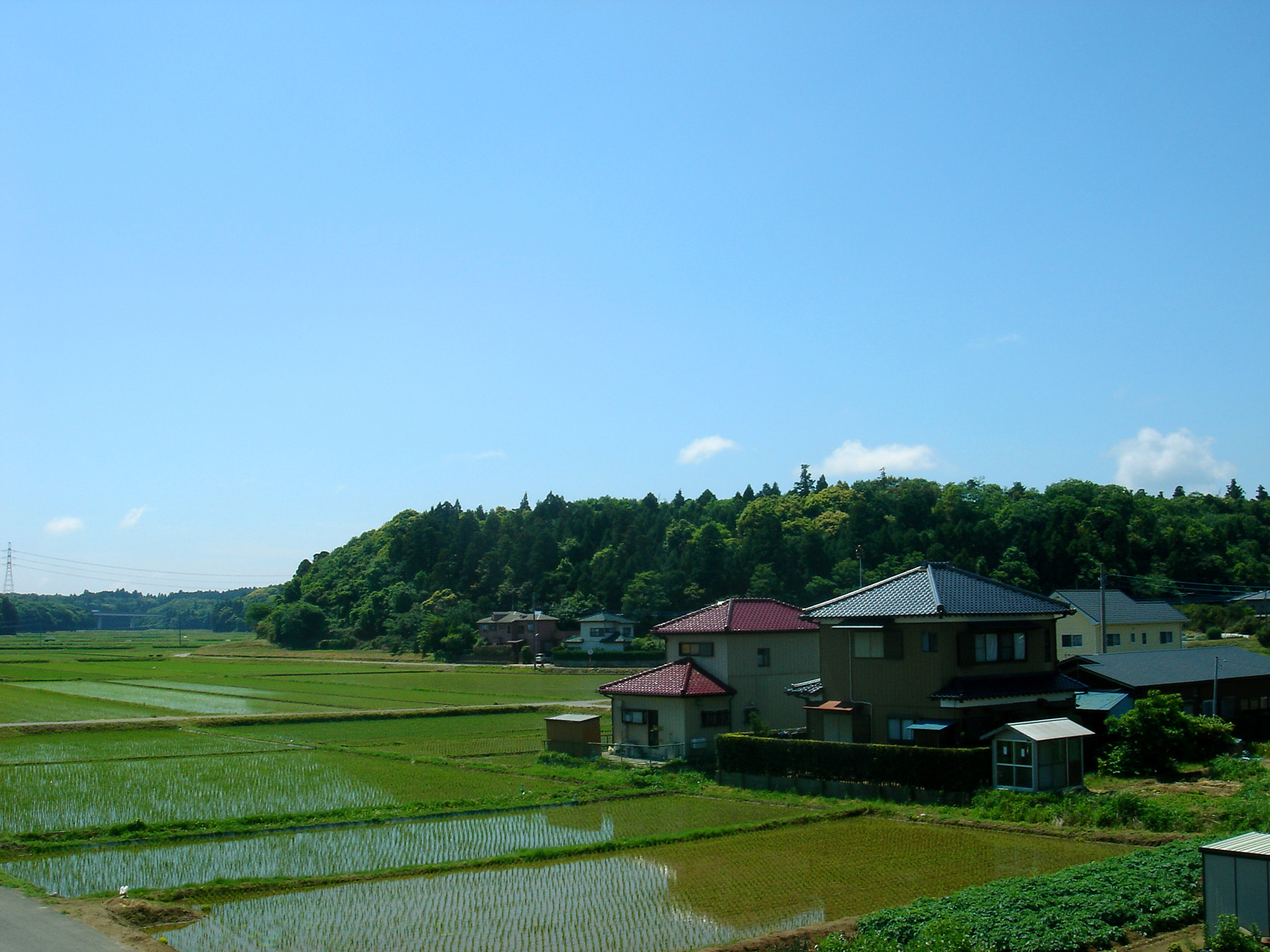
Rice fields in Sawara, Katori, Chiba

Rice production in Japan is important to the food supply in Japan, with rice being a staple part of the Japanese diet. Most people in Japan see this food as a substantial part of their daily diet.

== Production ==
Rice production is important to the food supply, with rice being a staple part of the Japanese diet. Japan is the ninth largest producer of rice in the world. The rice seasons in Northern Japan last from May–June to September–October. In central Japan, it is from April–May to August–October. In southern Japan the rice season is from April–May to August–September. About 85% of the 2.3 million farms in Japan plant rice yearly. Improved varieties of japonica rice are grown in almost all prefectures in the country. The most widely planted variety is Koshihikari.

The average rice field acreage of a Japanese farmer is very small and rice production is highly mechanized. Due to small farms, rice production is considered a part-time occupation by many farmers. The number of Japanese farm households and farm population has declined in recent decades, as has rice production. The decline came about because in 1969, the Ministry of Agriculture, Forestry, and Fisheries has asked farmers to reduce rice acreage; under the Staple Food Control Act of 1942 the Japanese government is formally in charge of all rice production, distribution, and sales. The most striking feature of Japanese agriculture, however, is the shortage of farmland. The 4.63×10^{6} hectares (1.14×10^{7} acres) under cultivation in 2008 has shrunk, with most farmers over 65. While Japan's rice acreage shrinks, in order to prop prices in the market up, much of its country-side lays depleted and bare.

However, the land is intensively cultivated. Paddy fields occupy much of the countryside, whether on the alluvial plains, the terraced slopes, or the swampland and coastal bays. Nonrice farmland share the terraces and lower slopes and are planted with wheat and barley in the autumn and with sweet potatoes, vegetables, and dry rice in the summer. Intercropping is common: such crops are alternated with beans and peas. Japan's strategy to protect the flooding of its rice market is to offer compensation to those who own land and agree to grow other commodities in a system called "Gentan", the rice production regulation scheme (a type of acreage reduction program), which was formally abolished in 2018.

== History ==
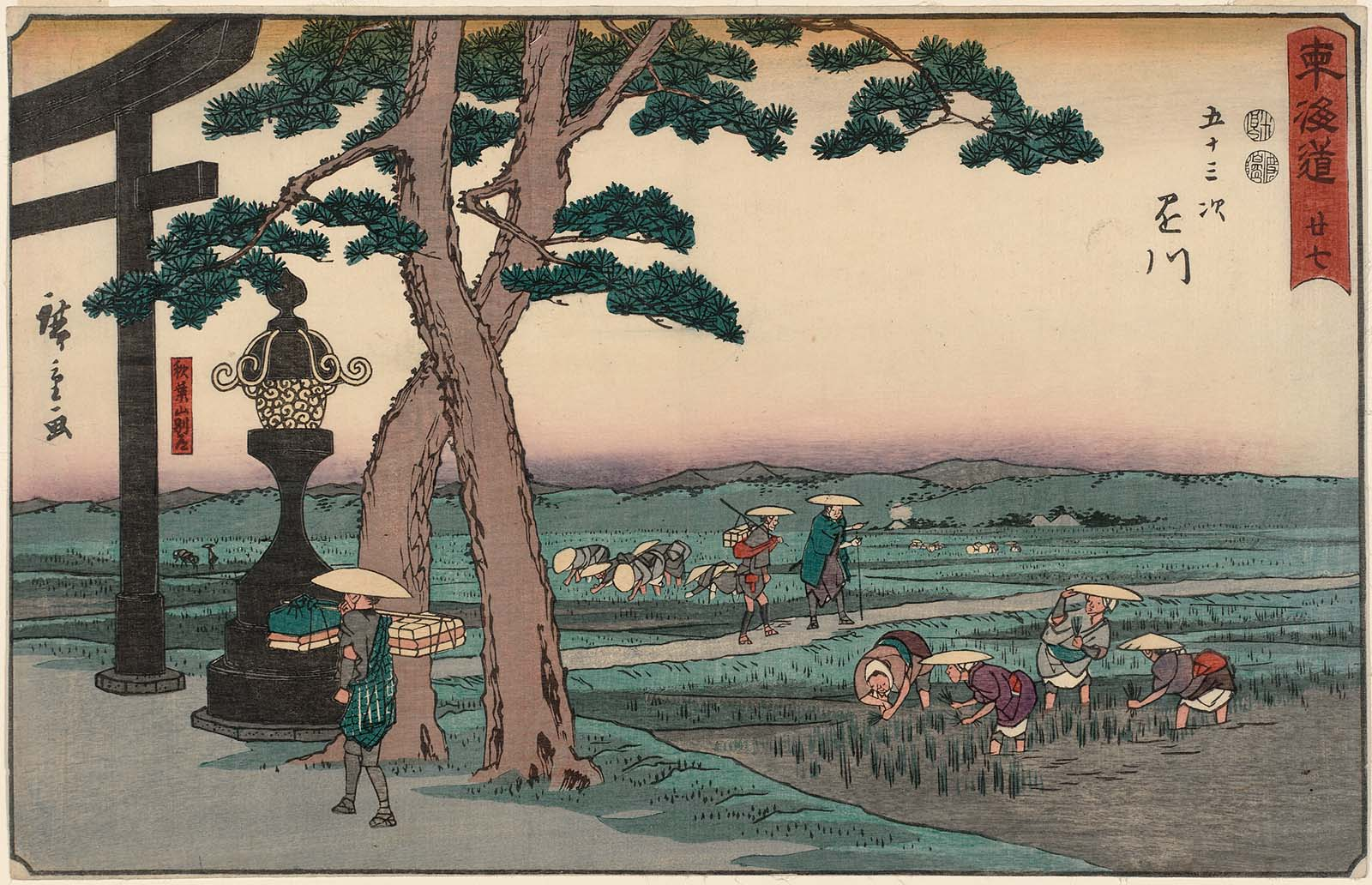
Peasants planting rice, by Hiroshige, c. 1847

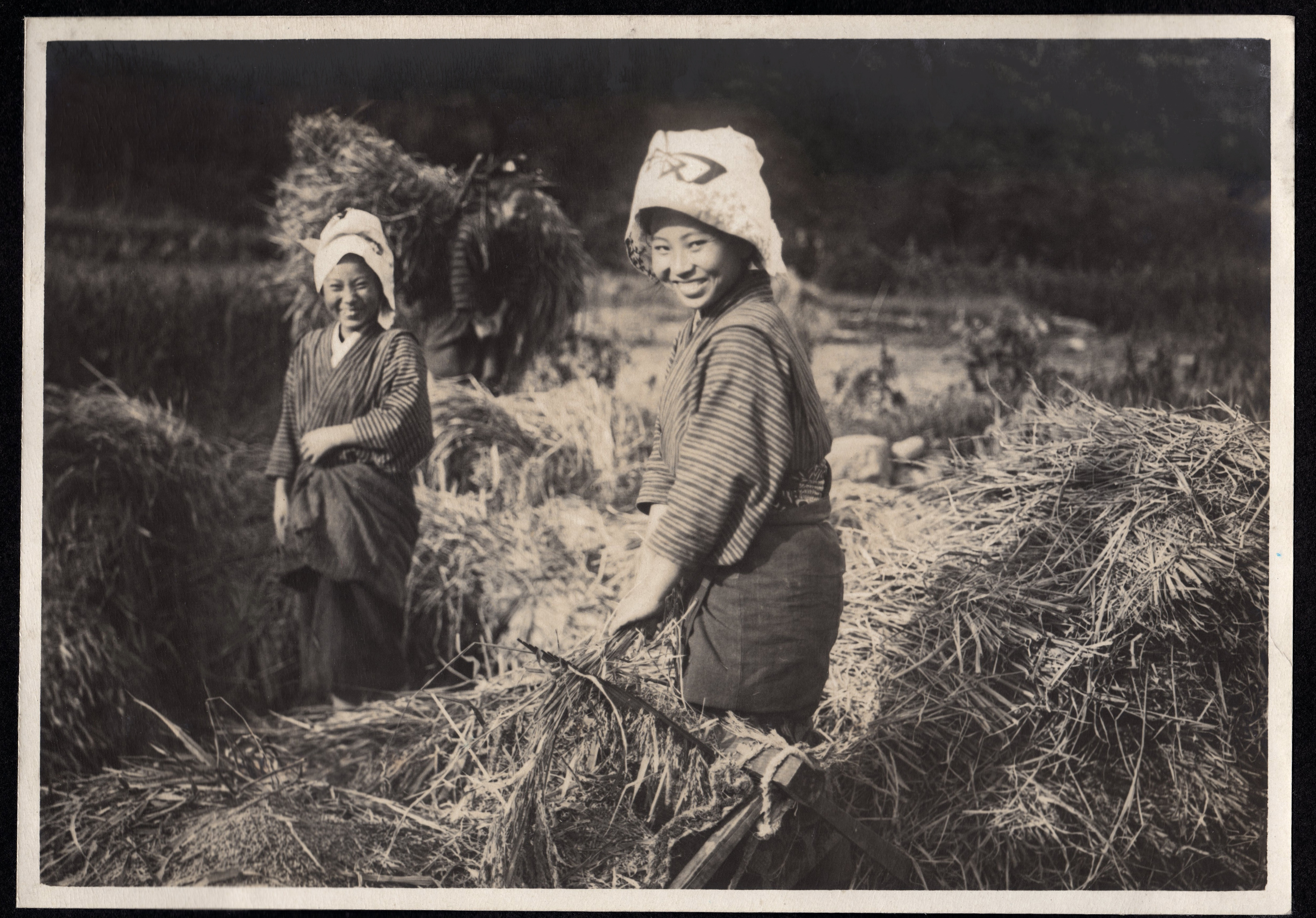
Japanese women rice farmers, taken between 1914 and 1918

Rice agriculture was brought to Japan during the first millennium BC by Korean farmer migrants. Wet-field rice agriculture was introduced into Japan between the Final Jōmon and the Early Yayoi periods. It is thought that this started the archipelago's agricultural revolution with its first intensive crop production. Rice occupies an emotional place in Japanese history, society, and political economy (Hsu, 1994).

Since the postwar land reform (1945–1949), Japanese farms have remained fragmented and small. To prevent the reconsolidation of farmland, joint-stock companies cannot own farmland; agricultural cooperatives can own farmland only if they do the actual farming. Currently the average rice farmer works only 1.65 acres (6680 square meters or 2/3 hectare), which is a little larger than a football field. A typical American farm is 160 times larger.

Because of legislative malapportionment favoring rural interests, rice farmers have had a pronounced influence in Japanese legislative politics. As part of the government's control of rice, rice imports are subject to high tariffs except in processed forms. Also, because of the disproportionate political power wielded by farmers, rice production is subsidized by the government. This aggravated trade frictions between Japan and the United States. To the extent that Japan's rice producers have expressed discontent in removing quotas and high tariffs that help their industry at home, at the price of other Japanese industries prospering such as (Kia). Tokyo's rationale for the ban is that self-sufficiency in rice is important for food security purposes. In addition domestic farm groups have long maintained that rice cultivation is part of Japanese culture. Yet this culture seems to be fading as Japan's subsidies come in the form of incentives for the younger population to claim their stake in future rice production industry although with higher education levels, this industry becomes less lucrative for them. Hayami (1988) argued that Japanese consumers have become more tolerant of high rice prices because their food expenditure as a ratio of total expenditure has declined as their incomes rise (Hsu, 1994). Surprisingly, consumer groups have not actively supported the lifting of the ban in order to reduce the rice price. The main reason is reportedly the Japanese consumers’ demand for "high-quality" rice. Surveys indicate that consumers believe that foreign rice tastes bad.

In the Uruguay Round of GATT (General Agreement of Tariffs and Trade) negotiations in 1990, Japan refused to give concessions in eliminating its ban on rice imports. It was estimated that without the ban, U.S. rice exports to Japan could have amounted to $656 million a year. As of 2010 free trade in connection with the Trans-Pacific Partnership is again being debated in Japan.

== Comparisons ==
Projection in metric tons in 2016 include rice, 11 million; sugar beets, 4.7 million; potatoes, 2.9 million; cabbage, 2.3 million; mandarin oranges, 1.4 million; onions, 1.1 million; sweet potatoes, 1 million; apples, 881,100; and cucumbers, 700,000. Other crops include melons, tomatoes, wheat, soybeans, tea, tobacco, and other fruits and vegetables.

== See also ==
- Agriculture in Japan
