= Satoumi =

Marine and coastal landscapes

Satoumi (里海) is defined as marine and coastal landscapes that have been formed and maintained by prolonged interaction between humans and ecosystems.

== See also ==
- Satoyama, management of forests through local agricultural communities
