= Louisiana Fishing Enhancement Act =

The Louisiana Fishing Enhancement Act (1986-LA R.S. 56:639.6) is a State of Louisiana law that also established the Louisiana Artificial Reef Development Council (Artificial Reef Council). This laid the foundation for the Louisiana artificial reefs program (LARP), that provides policy and procedures, as well as oversight of the Louisiana Department of Wildlife and Fisheries, for the development and implementation of artificial reefs. The Louisiana Artificial Reef Trust Fund was also created. To fund is intended to support artificial reef, especially the Louisiana Rigs-to-Reefs program.

== History ==
The Louisiana Fishing Enhancement Act was based on the National Fishing Enhancement Act of 1984 (Public Law 98-623, Title II) and the National artificial reef plan (33 USC 2103) that was amended in 2007 and sponsored by the Atlantic States Marine Fisheries Commission (ASMFC) and Gulf States Marine Fisheries Commission (GSMFC). The Bureau of Safety and Environmental Enforcement (BSEE) is the lead agency for the Rigs-to-Reef (R2R) program.

The Louisiana Fishing Enhancement Act (1986) led to the adoption of the Artificial Reef Plan in 1987 that included the Louisiana Inshore and Nearshore Artificial Reef Plan. Louisiana was the first state to create an artificial reef program. The gulf coast states of Alabama, Florida, Mississippi, and Texas have Rigs-to-Reef programs. Other states like California also have Rigs-to-reef programs.

=== Rigs-to-Reefs ===
Louisiana has become the largest rigs-to-reef program in the world and in 1999 created the world's largest artificial reef in the area of the Freeport sulfur mine near Grand Isle, Louisiana.

== Louisiana Artificial Reef Trust Fund ==
The Louisiana Artificial Reef Trust Fund (Artificial Reef Development Fund by Louisiana Revised Statutes Tit. 56, § 639.8), created with the Louisiana Fishing Enhancement Act, and in accordance to section 10 of the Rivers and Harbors Act of 1899, section 404 of the Federal Water Pollution Control Act, section 4(e) of the Outer Continental Shelf Lands Act, National Fishing Enhancement Act of 1984 (Public Law 98-623) sections 204–207, enacted November 8, 1984, which allows funding of artificial reefs, specifically rigs-to-reefs, with a goal of enhancing habitat and diversity of fishery resources and recreational and commercial fishing opportunities, managing and monitoring inshore, nearshore, offshore, and deepwater artificial reef sites.

Governor Bobby Jindal began using Artificial Reef Funds (sweeping of funds), for coastal protection and restoration, into the general operating budget to balance the Louisiana budget. The Louisiana Wildlife Federation considered filing a suit to stop this.
