= Agriculture, forestry, and fishing in Japan =

Development of agricultural output of Japan in 2015 US$ since 1961

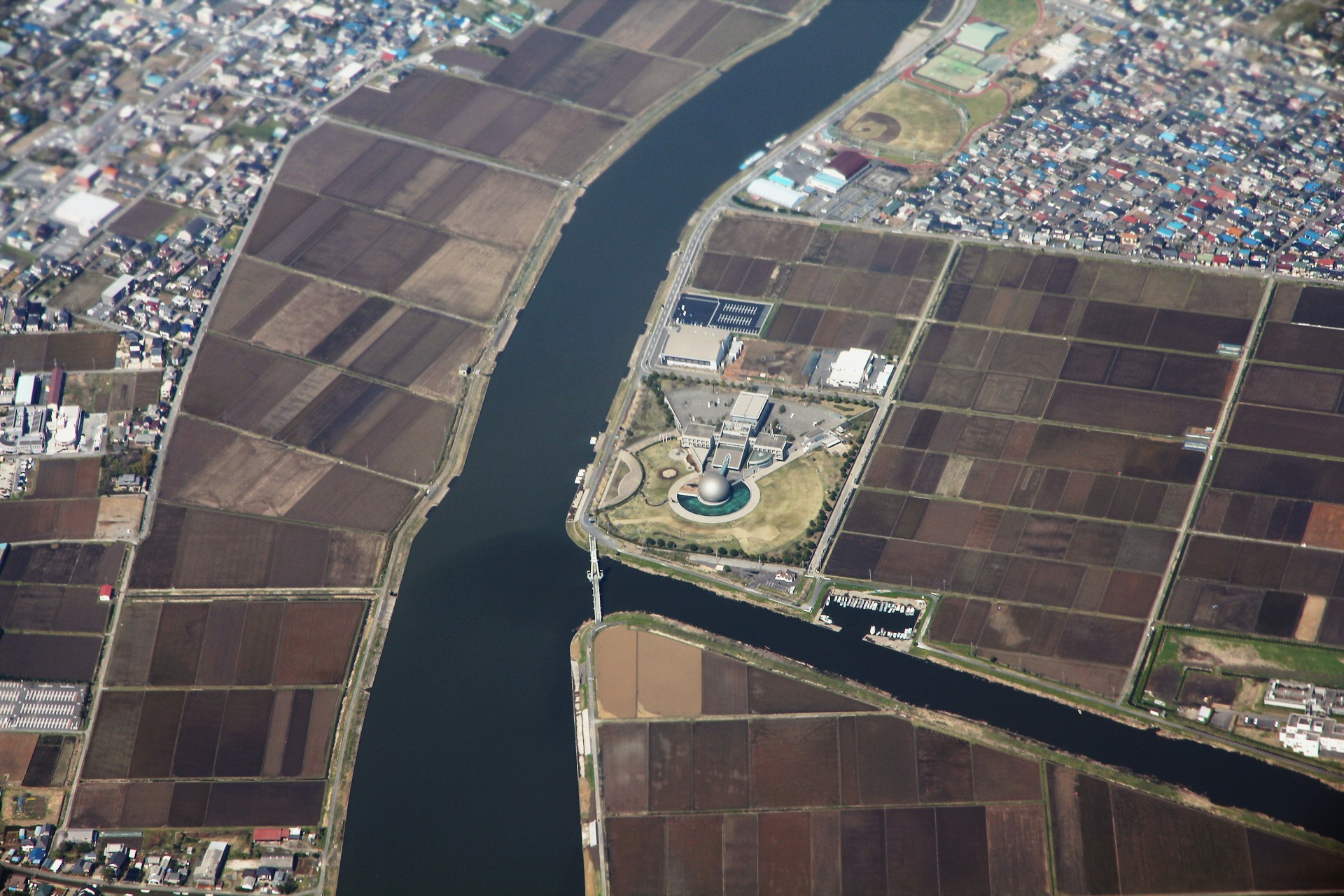
Fields of Chiba prefecture

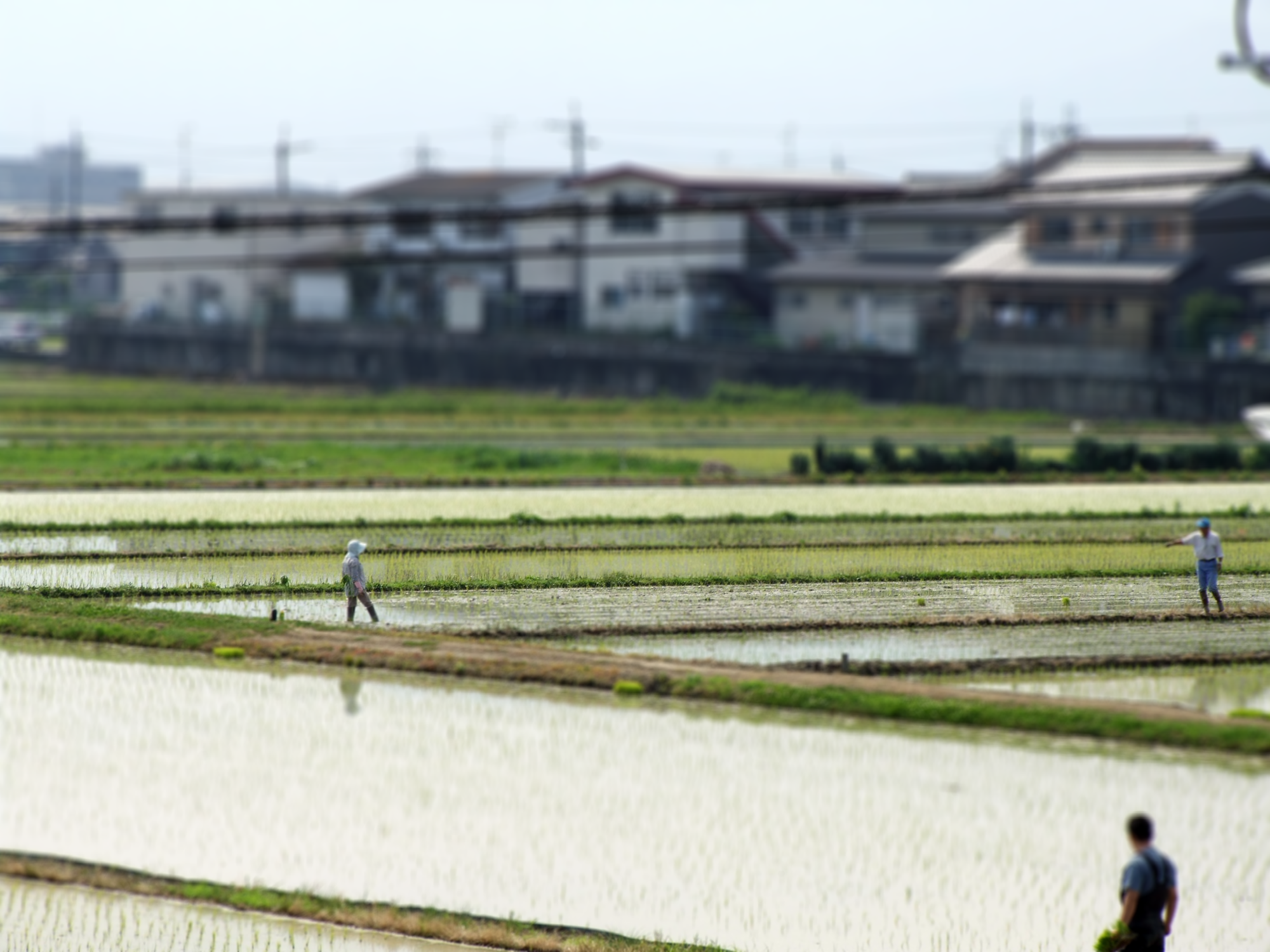
Rice fields

Agriculture, forestry, and fishing (Japanese: 農林水産, nōrinsuisan) form the primary sector of industry of the Japanese economy together with the Japanese mining industry. Together, they account for 1.3% of gross national product; only 12% of Japan's land is suitable for cultivation, and the agricultural economy is highly subsidized.

Agriculture, forestry, and fishing dominated the Japanese economy until the 1940s, but thereafter declined into relative unimportance (see Agriculture in the Empire of Japan). In the late 19th century (Meiji period), these sectors had accounted for more than 80% of employment. Employment in agriculture declined in the prewar period, but the sector was still the largest employer (about 50% of the work force) by the end of World War II. It was further declined to 23.5% in 1965, 11.9% in 1977, and to 7.2% in 1988. The importance of agriculture in the national economy later continued its rapid decline, with the share of net agricultural production in GNP finally reduced between 1975 and 1989 from 4.1% to 3% In the late 1980s, 85.5% of Japan's farmers were also engaged in occupations outside farming, and most of these part-time farmers earned most of their income from nonfarming activities.

Japan's economic boom that began in the 1950s left farmers far behind in both income and agricultural technology. They were attracted to the government's food control policy under which high rice prices were guaranteed and farmers were encouraged to increase the output of any crops of their own choice. Farmers became mass producers of rice, even turning their own vegetable gardens into rice fields. Their output swelled to over 14 million metric tons in the late 1960s, a direct result of greater cultivated area and increased yield per unit area, owing to improved cultivation techniques.

Three types of farm households developed: those engaging exclusively in agriculture (14.5% of the 4.2 million farm households in 1988, down from 21.5% in 1965); those deriving more than half their income from the farm (14.2% down from 36.7% in 1965); and those mainly engaged in jobs other than farming (71.3% up from 41.8% in 1965). As more and more farm families turned to nonfarming activities, the farm population declined (down from 4.9 million in 1975 to 4.8 million in 1988). The rate of decrease slowed in the late 1970s and 1980s, but the average age of farmers rose to 51 years by 1980, twelve years older than the average industrial employee. Historically and today, women farmers outnumber male farmers. Government data from 2011 showed women heading more than three-quarters of new agribusiness ventures.

== Agriculture ==
In 2018, Japan produced 9.7 million tons of rice (13th largest producer in the world), 3.6 million tons of sugar beet (used to produce sugar and ethanol), 1.2 million tons of sugarcane (used to produce sugar and ethanol), 208 thousand tons of persimmon (4th largest producer in the world), 2.3 million tons of potatoes, 1.3 million tons of cabbage, 1.6 million tons of onion, 773 thousand tons of tangerine, 756 thousand tons of apple, 764 thousand tons of wheat, 724 thousand tons of tomato, 612 thousand tons of carrot, 578 thousand tons of lettuce and chicory, 550 thousand tons of cucumber, 317 thousand tons of watermelon, 300 thousand tons of eggplant, 258 thousand tons of pear, 226 thousand tons of spinach, 211 thousand tons of soy, 197 thousand tons of pumpkin, 174 thousand tons of barley, 174 thousand tons of grape, 164 thousand tons of cauliflower and broccoli, 164 thousand tons of yam, 163 thousand tons of strawberry, 143 thousand tons of melon, 141 thousand tons of taro, 140 thousand tons of pepper, 113 thousand tons of peach, 112 thousand tons of apricot, and 2.7 million tons of other vegetables, in addition to smaller productions of other agricultural products.

== Land shortage ==
Due to Japan's distinctive geography and geology, there is a shortage of farmland. The 49,000 square kilometres (19,000 sq mi) under cultivation constituted just 13.2% of the total land area in 1988. However, the land is intensively cultivated. Rice paddies occupy most of the countryside, whether on the alluvial plains, the terraced slopes, or wetlands and coastal bays. Non-paddy farmland shares the terraces and lower slopes and is planted with wheat and barley in the autumn and with sweet potatoes, vegetables, and dry rice in the summer. Intercropping is common: such crops are alternated with beans, peas, and onions.

Japanese agriculture has been characterized as a "sick" sector because it must contend with a variety of constraints, such as the rapidly diminishing availability of arable land and falling agricultural incomes. The problem of surplus rice was further aggravated by extensive changes in the diets of many Japanese in the 1970s and 1980s. Even a major rice crop failure did not reduce the accumulated stocks by more than 25% of the reserve. In 1990, Japan was 67% self-sufficient in agricultural products and provided for around 30% of its cereal and fodder needs.

As an attempt to consolidate farmland and increase productivity, Farmland Intermediary Management Organizations (nōchi chūkan kanri kikō), also known as Farmland Banks, were introduced as part of a reform package in 2014, which also included the reform of local Agricultural Committees. As Jentzsch notes, "The reform package is supposed to rationalize farmland consolidation into the hands of ninaite [bearer] farms, including corporations.

== Impacts of climate change ==
Changing climatic conditions, with increasing temperature trends, decreasing rainfall and intensifying heat waves, droughts and other external phenomena, affect food production. These conditions tend to decrease crop yields and quality. Responses to the increase in temperature may be directed to the displacement of crop zones to higher elevations where ideal climatic conditions for growth can be found. With the increase in temperature, there may be changes in the length of the vegetative period and the early appearance of phenological phases.

Studies have shown that climate change is already having a significant impact on rice agriculture with the increase of extreme events such as heat or dry spells. These changes represent a serious concern for growers and may become a source of the vulnerability of the crop production system and pose a threat to national food security. It has been shown that there is a direct relationship between rice production and temperature, when the degree of climate change is large, production decreases. Yield reductions have been reported in specific areas or in extremely hot years.

Irrigation demand could be increased by higher temperatures due to higher plant evapotranspiration. The expansion of irrigated areas could become a threat to water resources, in terms of quantity and quality, if demand and cereal production increase.

== Livestock ==
Livestock raising is a minor activity. Demand for beef rose in the 1900s, and farmers often shifted from dairy farming to production of high-quality (and high-cost) beef, such as Kobe beef. Throughout the 1980s, domestic beef production met over 2% of demand. In 1991, as a result of heavy pressure from the United States, Japan ended import quotas on potatoes as well as citrus fruit. Milk cows are numerous in Hokkaido, where 25% of farmers run dairies, but milk cows are also raised in Iwate, in Tōhoku, and near Tokyo and Kobe. Beef cattle are mostly concentrated in western Honshu, and on Kyushu. Hogs, the oldest domesticated animals raised for food, are found everywhere. Pork is the most popular meat.

Most of the imported beef comes from Australia, since beef from the United States and Canada was banned after the first cases of BSE in those countries. Those bans were lifted in 2006.

== Forestry ==
Two thirds of land of Japan is forest. 40% of the forests in Japan are planted forests, such as cedar and cypress. They are mainly planted after the Pacific War, in attempt to produce construction material. However, after Japan had experienced rapid economic growth, they switched construction material from wood to reinforced concrete. Moreover, cheaper import wood became more attractive, compared to domestic wood which is produced in steep mountains and requires high labor costs. Nowadays, many planted forests are too dense and need thinning.

In 2015, the Japanese forestry industry produced 20.05 million m^{3} volume of wood and 436.3 billion yen of production, with half of it from mushroom production. Forestry composes 0.04% of Japan's GDP.

== Fisheries ==
The Japanese fishing industry, both domestic and overseas, has long been centered on the Tsukiji fish market, in Tokyo, which is one of the world's largest wholesale markets for fresh, frozen, and processed seafood. Japan also has greatly advanced the techniques of aquaculture or sea farming. In this system, artificial insemination and hatching techniques are used to breed fish and shellfish, which are then released into rivers or seas. These fish and shellfish are caught after they grow bigger. Salmon is raised this way.

Japan has more than 2,000 fishing ports, including Nagasaki, in southwest Kyūshū; Otaru, Kushiro, and Abashiri in Hokkaidō. Major fishing ports on the Pacific coast of Honshū include, Hachinohe, Kesennuma, and Ishinomaki along the Sanriku coast, as well as Choshi, Yaizu, Shimizu, and Misaki to the east and south of Tokyo.

Japan is also one of the world's few whaling nations. Japan was a member of the International Whaling Commission, where the government pledged that its fleets would restrict their catch to international quotas, but it attracted international opprobrium for its failure to sign an agreement placing a moratorium on catching sperm whales. Japan withdrew from the International Whaling Commission in December 2018 and resumed commercial whaling in July 2019; since then, whaling activities have been limited to its territorial waters and exclusive economic zone.

Two of the largest fishing companies in Japan are Nippon Suisan Kaisha and Maruha Nichiro; each employs more than 10,000 people and owns subsidiaries around the world.

=== Government position ===
The Ministry of Agriculture, Forestry and Fisheries is the government agency responsible for the fishing industry. The Japanese Fisheries Agency states that the Basic Fisheries Plan was developed by the Japanese government in 2007, and claims that the government is working to establish long-standing, strong fisheries and fishery practices by promoting the overall restoration of the fishery industry. This can be accomplished by promoting surveys and research into fishery resources, the promotion of international resource management in international waters, promoting international cooperation within the international fishing grounds, and improving the living environments for all aquatic life in inland waters, while at the same time promoting aquaculture. This restoration consists of many different phases to include the restoration and management of high-level fishery resources.

Other priorities of the Japanese government include continuing to develop new technologies to improve fishery operations, whether incorporating new workplace needed technologies, or creating and exploiting intellectual properties. Also, at the top of the list is the reorganization of the fish-labor industry organizations from the top down. The government provides support to the fishery operators groups by helping to acquire the equipment necessary to reduce fuel consumption, through the introduction of energy-saving operating systems. In order to maintain a strong work force in the fishery industry, the government has programs to encourage college students to look into the industry as a possible career path. This includes supporting activities that provide the opportunity to experience stationary net fishing and aquaculture. The government also provides the prospective employees with job information from fisheries worldwide while holding job seminars with well recognized companies in the Japanese fishery business. There is also a government sponsored on-site training program for individuals planning to make a career in the fishery industry. The fisheries in Japan are governed by the Japanese Fisheries Agency.

The Fisheries Agency is organized into four departments: Fisheries Policy Planning Department, Resources Management Department, Resources Development Department, and Fishing Port Department. The Fisheries Policy Planning Department is in charge of the planning of policies concerning the fisheries, and all administrative matters that go along with the organization. The Resources Management Department plans the continuous development of Japan's fisheries. The Resources Development Department is in charge of the scientific research and development in the field of fisheries. The Fishing Port Department is the base for fishery production activities and also the basis for the distribution and processing of the marine products.

=== Techniques ===
- Ayu fishing
- Tenkara fishing, a type of roach fishing
- Factory ship
- Artificial reefs are used to increase the sustainable fishing activities on the coastline.
- Dolphin drive hunting

=== In literature ===
In 2008, Takiji Kobayashi's A Crab Canning Boat, a 1929 Marxist novel about a crab boat crew determined to stand up to a cruel captain under harsh conditions, became a surprise bestseller, thanks to an advertising campaign linking the novel to the working poor.

== See also ==
- Ministry of Agriculture, Forestry and Fisheries (Japan)
- Agricultural Protectionism in Japan
- List of Important Agricultural Heritage Systems (Japan)
- Women in agriculture in Japan
- Radiation effects from Fukushima I nuclear accidents
- Marine biology
