= Hakone Onsen =

Hot springs in Hakone, Kanagawa, Japan

- 箱根温泉
- Location within Kanagawa Prefecture
- Location: Hakone, Kanagawa Prefecture, Japan
- Coordinates: 35°14′31″N 139°3′30″E
- Elevation: 700〜1250 meters
- Type: mostly alkaline
- Temperature: 30〜80°C

Hakone Onsen, or Hakone Hot Springs, is a general term for numerous thermal spas located in the town of Hakone, Ashigarashimo District, Kanagawa Prefecture, Japan, an area formerly known as Sagami Province. Situated about 90 kilometres (56 mi) southwest of Tokyo and 60 kilometres (37 mi) east-southeast of Mt. Fuji, it is one of the most popular hot spring resorts in central Japan. At least twenty hot spring spring resorts exist around Mt. Hakone, an area that is designated as part of the Fuji Hakone Izu National Park.

== History ==
The first hot spring in this area was reputedly opened in 738 during the Nara period by a wandering Buddhist priest and it is still used today. Hakone Onsen became famous after the warlord Toyotomi Hideyoshi conquered Odawara. He gathered samurai from many parts of the country to attack Odawara Castle, and after the battle rested in a hot spring there.

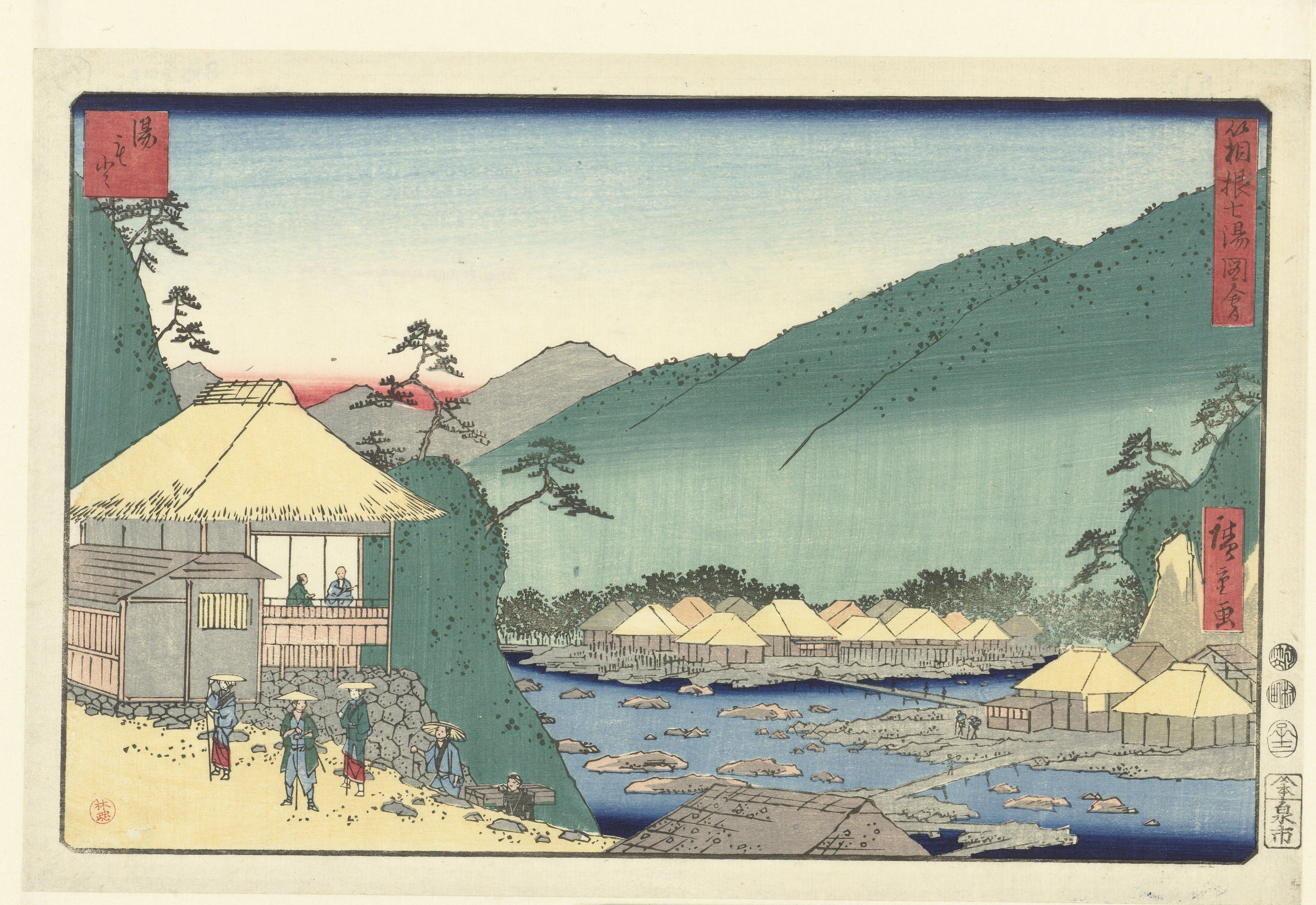
The Hakone Yumoto area during the Tokugawa Era, RP-P-1962-372

During the Tokugawa shogunate, tributary hot water from Hakone was regularly presented to the shogun in Edo (Tokyo). The area prospered as a way station along the Tōkaidō Road.

Gradually the number of hot springs in the Hakone area expanded over the centuries. During the late 19th and early 20th centuries, Hakone expanded as a resort and tourist destination. In 1919, the Hakone Tozan Railway line was completed to Hakone-Yumoto Station, making many hot springs in Hakone easily accessible to residents of Tokyo and Yokohama. In 1930 further work on that rail line was undertaken, expanding the number of hot springs within easy reach. Soon after World War II, the Odakyu Electric Railway was completed as far as Hakone Yumoto Station, making it very convenient for people from the Tokyo metro area to visit this resort. In 1935 the Seibu Railway also began rail service to Odawara, and regular buses took passengers the remaining 6 kilometres (3.7 mi) to Hakone.

When volcanic earthquakes increased around Mount Hakone in April 2015, the Japan Meteorological Agency placed that area on a Level 2 Alert, adversely impacted local tourism. The COVID-19 pandemic has also dented tourism, and some hot springs in the area are temporarily closed or operating at a reduced capacity.

== The original seven hot springs ==
The following seven hot springs in Hakone are considered to be the oldest thermal spas in that area.

Hakone Yumoto Onsen is now a group of hot spring resorts close to the Hakone Tozan Railway's Hakone-Yumoto Station. The waters of these springs are generally clear with a pH of 8.8 and fountainhead temperatures averaging 52 °C (126 °F), but ranging from 18.5–82.7 °C (65.3–180.9 °F).

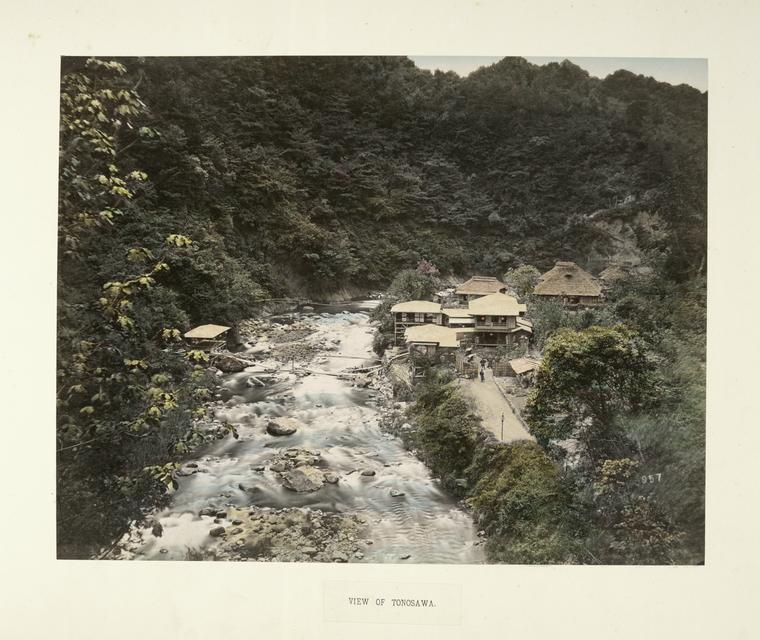
Tōnosawa Onsen during the Meiji Era

Tōnosawa Onsen is a small group of hot springs directly north of Hakone-Yumoto and Tōnosawa stations and just one stop from Hakone-Yumoto on the Hakone Tozan Railway. This area is known for its clear, alkaline waters and according to legend, it was discovered in 1604 by a Buddhist priest, who reputedly used it to help heal the sick.

Miyanoshita Onsen is a small cluster of hot spring facilities just two stops west of Tōnosawa Station on the Hakone Tozan Railway. The Fujiya Hotel and Ginyu Ryokan are both renown in this area and some of the springs feature salt water, which is said to be effective for some ailments.

Dōgashima Onsen is located two stops west of Tōnosawa Station on the Hakone Tozan Railway. Allegedly discovered by the 14th century zen master Musō Soseki at the bottom of a valley, two hotels exist in this area that are accessible by private monorail cable cars and ropeways. Actually, there are several hot springs in Japan with this name.

Sokokura Onsen is a 10-minute walk west of Miyanoshita Station on the Hakone Tozan Railway. The slightly salty hot springs of this spring are said to be helpful in alleviating neuralgia, joint pain, and coldness. During the Meiji Era, three hot spring inns existed here, but today only one remains in operation. Featured at this hot spring is a large stone bath that, if legend is correct, Toyotomi Hideyoshi used.

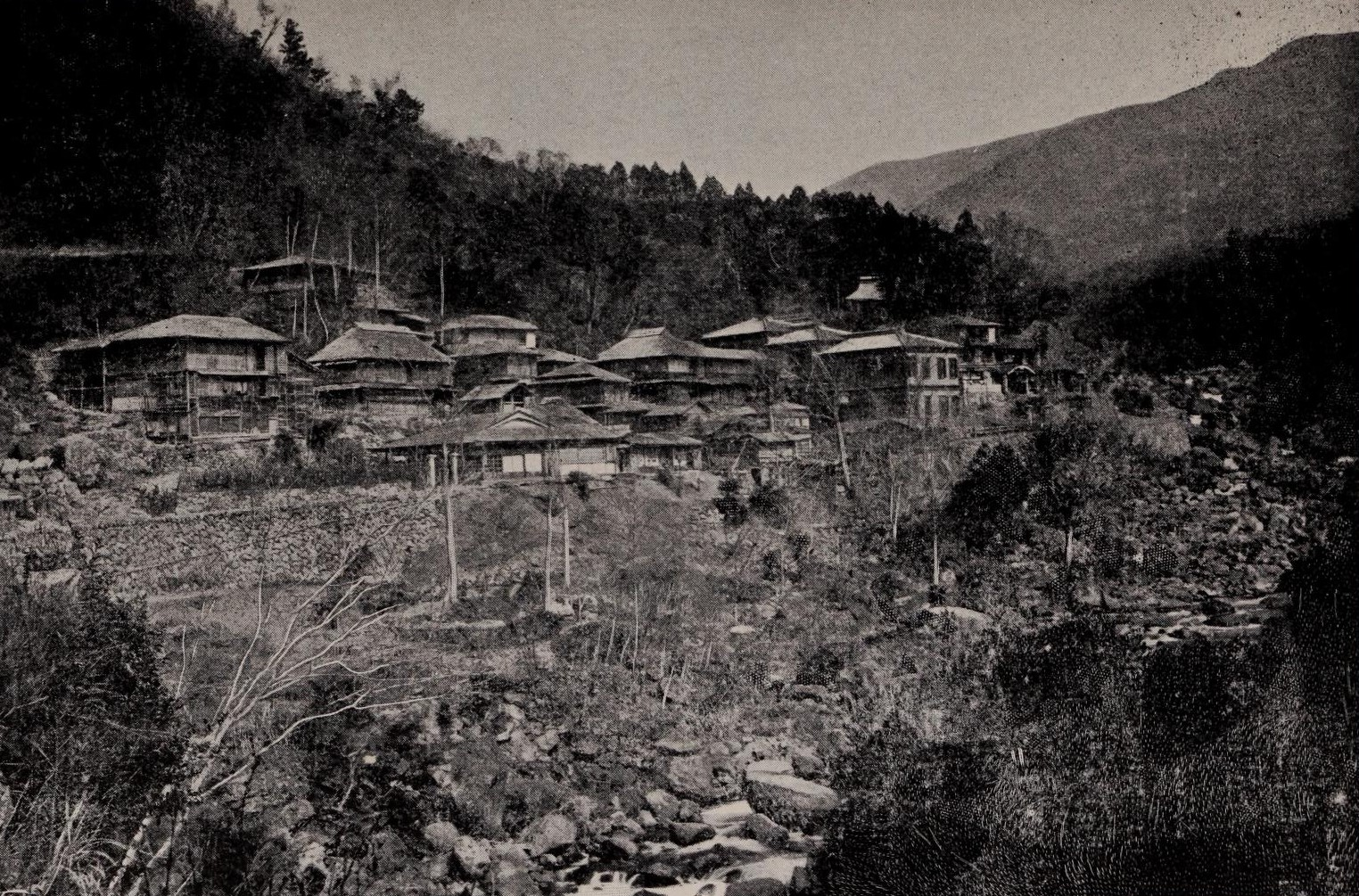
Kiga Onsen during the Meiji Era

Kiga Onsen is the second-oldest hot spring in the Hakone area and it opened towards the end of the Heian period. It is located near the Haya River and about 20 minutes on foot from Miyanoshita train station. Legend has it that when Minamoto no Yoritomo was injured in battle, a white fox appeared and led him to this hot spring. After his wounds healed, he returned to battle, eventually becoming the lord of the area. This legend suggests the white fox that led Yoritomo became his wife and was later enshrined as the fox-god Inari after his death. During the Japan's Warring States era, this hot spring was under the direct control of the Hōjō clan. Later in the Edo period, waters from this hot spring were regularly sent in tribute to the Tokugawa family. In 1892, the facilities were destroyed by a great fire, then later purchased by a major insurance company. In 2017 they were reopened to the public and today several facilities are in operation here.

Ashinoyu Onsen has the highest elevation of the seven hot springs of Hakone. In operation since the Kamakura Era, its unusual turbid alkaline waters are supposedly effective for some ailments. Since the Edo era many artists and writers have visited this hot spring and it was designated as a national resort hot spring area by the Japanese Ministry of the Environment in 2015.

== Other hot springs in Hakone ==
There are many additional thermal spas in Hakone, some of those are outlined briefly below.

Ubako Onsen is sometimes dubbed as “the eighth hot spring of Hakone” and is actually a cluster of resorts located near the terminus of the Hakone Ropeway near the north shores of Lake Ashi, which is the caldera of Mt. Hakone. The sulfate-rich waters here contain much sodium, calcium, and magnesium.

Ōwakudani Onsen is a geothermal valley located near Ōwakudani Station on the Hakone Ropeway. Unlike most other hot springs in the Hakone area, its waters are acidic.

Gōra Hot Spring is a cluster of 24 bathing facilities near Sōunzan Station on the Hakone Ropeway. Its alkaline waters have been popular since 1894 and in 1952 the number of hot springs here expanded.

Ohiradai Onsen is a hot spring facility located near Ōhiradai Station on the Hakone Tozan Railway that opened in 1951. The clear, salty waters of this spring, which have a pH of 8.5, are an excellent place to view cherry blossoms and hydrangeas.

Miyagino Onsen is located on the opposite bank of the Haya River, about 400 metres (1,300 ft) north of Gōra Station, which is a station on the Hakone Tozan Railway. The hot spring was opened in 1960. There are several hot springs in this area, such as the Hakone Municipal Miyagino Onsen Kaikan.

Ni-no-taira Onsen is a slightly alkaline hot spring at an elevation of 550 metres (1,800 ft) that opened in 1953 near Chōkoku-no-mori Station on the Hakone Tozan Railway. On a clear day, it affords a splendid view of the Sagami Bay and this onsen is located within walking distance to the Hakone Open-Air Museum.

Sengokuhara Onsen, also known as Sengokubara Onsen, is a small hot spring cluster north of Lake Ashi about 700 metres (2,300 ft) above sea level near the base of Mt. Kintokiyama. Its waters are rich in calcium sulfate and the Hakone Tozan Bus offers regular service to this area.

Yunohanasawa Onsen is located on the hillside of Mt. Komagatake at an altitude of 935 metres (3,068 ft). Built around 1890, on clear days it offers splendid views. As its name suggests, these springs are famous for the filamentous insoluble organic precipitates in their waters. Literally known as "hot spring flowers" (yunohana) in Japanese, they are rich in sulfur, calcium, aluminium, iron, and silicon.

Lake Ashi-no-ko Onsen is located in Motohakone on the shores of Lake Ashi near the platform for the Hakone's Pirate Pleasure Boat. This hot spring resort area was opened in 1966 and its waters are said to be rich in sulfur.

Takogawa Onsen, which was opened in 1987, is one of the newest hot springs in Hakone. Originally it was called Moto Hakone Onsen and it was part of the Lake Ashinoko Onsen, but in 1993 it became financially independent. Facing Lake Ashi, this hot spring facility boasts several resorts and its waters are rich in calcium sulfate.

Kojiri Onsen is a hot spring developed after the 1960s on the northern shore of Lake Ashi around Tōgendai Station on the Hakone Ropeway.

Sōunzan Onsen is located near Sōunzan Station on the Hakone Tozan Cable Car Line. Some famous temples are in this area and its waters are rich in calcium, magnesium, and sodium-sulfate.
