= List of U.S. state artificial reefs program =

Creation of the National Fishing Enhancement Act of 1984 (Public Law 98–623) led to states wanting to create artificial reefs needed to create an artificial reefs program.

- U.S. state artificial reef programs
  - Alabama: The Alabama Department of Conservation and Natural Resources Neptune VK826 oil rig ("Beer Can Rig") is located 60 nautical miles off the Alabama coast. Over time the artificial reef becomes covered by epifaunal organisms such as oysters, musselss, barnacles, tunicates, sponges, and corals. This increases small-scale changes in the surface relief of the structure which provides habitat for crabs, worms, sea urchins, blennies, and other animals.
  - Mississippi: Mississippi Artificial Reefs Bureau
  - Delaware: Delaware Artificial Reef Program Delaware has fourteen artificial reef sites in Delaware Bay and along the Atlantic Coast.
  - North Carolina: North Carolina Artificial Reefs Program
  - Florida: Florida Artificial Reefs
  - South Carolina: South Carolina Artificial Reefs Program
  - Georgia: Georgia's Offshore Artificial Reefs Program
  - Texas: Texas Artificial Reefs Interactive
  - Louisiana: Louisiana artificial reefs Program.
  - Virginia: Virginia Artificial Reef Program
  - California: California Artificial Reef Program (501(c)3 nonprofit organization)
  - Massachusetts
  - New York
  - New Jersey: The Department of Environmental Protection's Division of Fish and Wildlife has 17 artificial reef sites located from 2 to 25 miles offshore.
  - Maryland: The Coastal Conservation Association of Maryland as well as the Maryland Artificial Reef Program and the Maryland Artificial Reef Initiative, following guidelines of the Artificial Reef Management Plan for Maryland.
  - Hawaii: Hawaii began exploring artificial reefs in the 1950s. In 1961 the first artificial reef was created at Maunalua Bay In 1963 two more artificial reefs were created and all three primarily used car bodies. From 1964 to 1985, concrete pipes were primarily used. From 1985 to 1991 concrete and tire modules were used as well as various concrete material, barges, and even large truck tires. Any use that includes tires has been deprecated since 1991 due to environmental concerns. Since 1991 concrete z-modules have been used as well as barges, concrete material, and small vessels.
