= Miyanoshita Onsen =

Thermal spring in Kanagawa Prefecture, Japan

Coordinates: 35°14′31″N 139°3′30″E

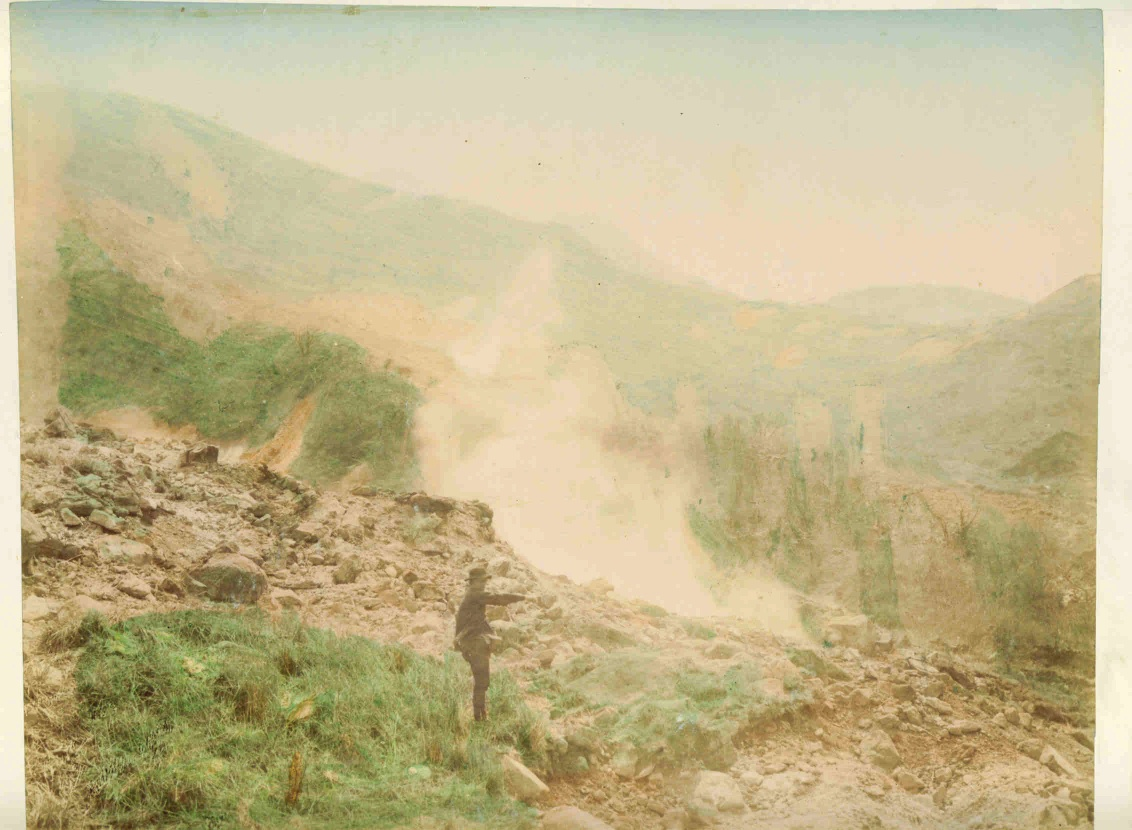
Miyanoshita photographed in 1880

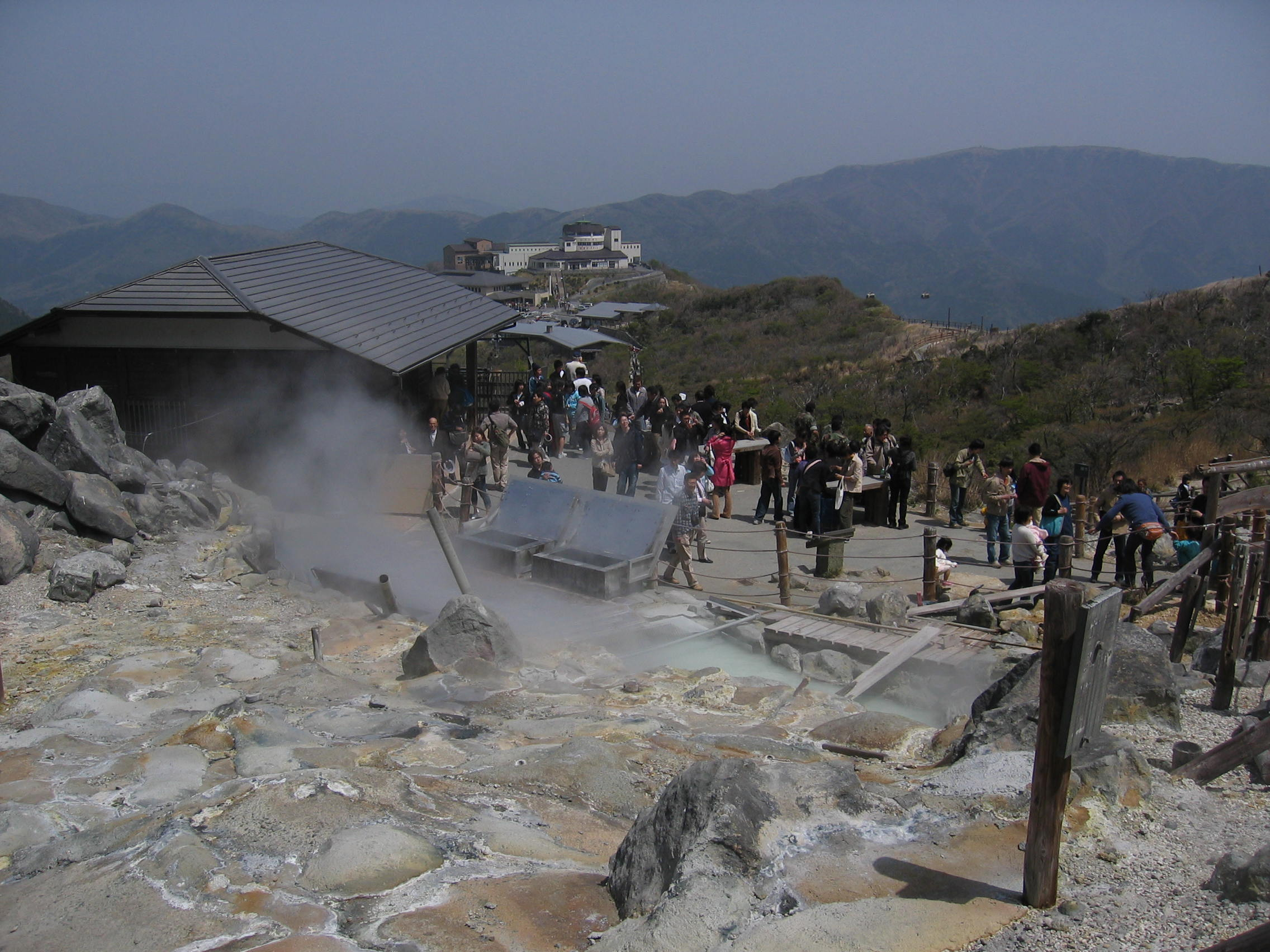
Onsen tamago shop and Ōwakudani Station

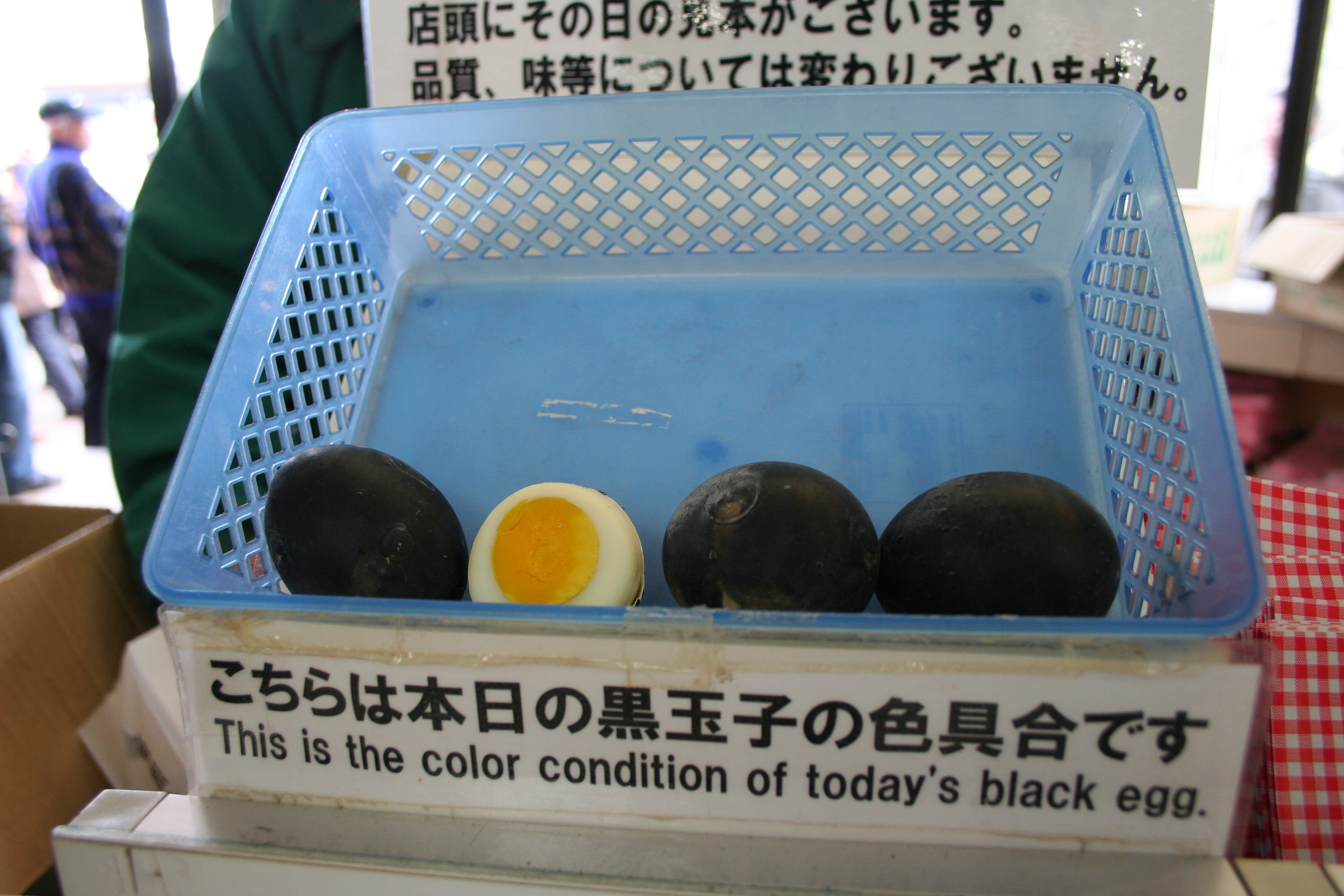
Onsen tamago (Black egg)

Miyanoshita (宮ノ下) is an onsen in the town of Hakone, Kanagawa Prefecture, Japan. The hot springs have been an attraction for tourists and pleasure-seekers for hundreds of years going back to the beginning of the Edo period. The town is situated on a plateau in the Haya River valley. Miyanoshita is one of the Seven Hot Springs of Hakone (Hakone Nanayu). During his tour of Japan in 1873 the Emperor Meiji stayed at a hotel here. The town is also home to the Sōtō temple Jōsen-ji.

== See also ==
- Fujiya Hotel
- Miyanoshita Station
