= Louisiana artificial reefs =

Project to provide artificial marine habitats

The Louisiana Artificial Reef Program (ARP) was established in 1986 to create habitats for providing food, and shelter for marine life that includes coastal fish, using human-made structures. The program includes several types of artificial reefs that supports ecosystem development, recreational fishing and diving, and critical research. A secondary benefit for those close to shore is coastal protection by reducing the impact of storms, flooding, preventing loss of life, property damage, and coastal erosion.

In 1999, the Louisiana Artificial Reef Program created the world's largest artificial reef by area, referred to as Grand Isle #9, from the Freeport Sulfur Mine off Grand Isle.

As of 2021 oil companies have taken advantage of the Rigs-to-Reefs program with over 600 platforms converted and over 350 are in Louisiana.

== History ==
In 1984 Congress passed the Louisiana Fishing Enhancement Act (LA R.S. 56:639.6 or Public Law 98-623, Title II). The law also created the National Artificial Reef Plan that allowed the establishment of a state reef-permitting system.

The Louisiana Artificial Reef Development Council (Artificial Reef Council) was also created under the Louisiana Artificial Reef Program. The members are the Secretary of the Louisiana Department of Wildlife and Fisheries, Dean of LSU College of the Coast and Environment, and the executive director of the Louisiana Sea Grant.

In 1990 the Coastal Wetlands Planning, Protection and Restoration Act (CWPPRA) was signed into law by then President George H. W. Bush to fund construction of coastal wetlands restoration projects. Since 1990 there has been 210 projects authorized.

=== The Rigs-to-Reefs program ===
In response to concerns of habitat loss when a rig ceases production the state created the Rigs-to-reefs program based on criteria from the national Rigs-to-reefs program. Companies can donate decommissioned platforms to the LDWF. Companies also donate half the money saved to the Louisiana Artificial Reef Trust Fund that was created along with the ARP. For platforms farther offshore this can be a tremendous savings as opposed to tearing the rig down and bringing it to shore. The Bureau of Safety and Environmental Enforcement (BSEE) oversees permitting. After a state accepts a donated rig the U.S. Army Corps of Engineers issues a permit, the state accepts liability and maintenance. In 2017 there were 350 platforms converted to reefs.

The process of Rigs-to-Reefs is complex and lengthy. After a company expresses interest to include a platform in the program, permits are required. The LDWF is the lead state agency, starts the permit process, and notifies all the other regulatory agencies. A process of planning, site selection, material selection, permitting, and monitoring of inshore, and nearshore artificial reef development. Both nearshore (normally considered 3 nautical miles) and inshore sites require additional permitting per the National Fishing Enhancement Act and Louisiana Fishing Enhancement Act. Nearshore and inshore sites see far more traffic than offshore. The depth of 100 feet (30 m) or less means the oil platform jackets (legs) might have to be excluded. Leaving the jackets upright, but shortened to comply with minimum jacket to surface requirements, is usually the preferred option. Jackets already in place will have already become an unintended artificial reef. The reef design and development standards depends on certain factors being examined for each site. These include, among other things, environmental and biological factors as well as social and economic considerations. A United States Coast Guard buoy permit is required as the size of a buoy is dependent on the depth and location of water. All five Gulf of Mexico coastal states, Alabama, Florida, Louisiana, Mississippi, and Texas, have artificial reef programs, that includes decommissioned platforms. All five states have an artificial reef coordinator. In Louisiana the coordinator reviews an operator's reefing plan and secures a permit from the Corps of Engineers.

In water that extends from the states boundary to the continental shelf break of the continental margin, or 200 nautical miles (370.4 km; 230.2 mi) seaward, whichever is farthest from the state boundary, the federal government has authority. Any potential rigs-to-reefs in areas under federal authority are also subject to US Corps of Engineers oversight and permitting as well as the Bureau of Safety and Environmental Enforcement (BSEE) and issuing of a permit. At the state level, the Coastal Management Division of the Louisiana Department of Natural Resources will examine the permits and plans to ensure compliance with state and federal guidelines. Once a structure is accepted into the State reef program, and the reefing operation is complete, the state assumes title and all responsibility for the structure. This includes an exemption from 30 CFR §250.1725(a).

The Coastal Protection and Restoration Authority (CPRA) is the lead agency concerning the criteria of coastal protection and funding. This includes the authority (oversight) for developing, implementing, and enforcing master and annual plans that are submitted to the Louisiana Legislature. The 2023 Coastal Master Plan, the fourth since inception and revised every six years, lays the foundation for current and future goals concerning the Louisiana coast protection, conservation, enhancement, and restoration. The authority of CPRA is vested by the Louisiana House and Senate through legislation (Louisiana Revised Statutes) R.S. 49:214.1, R.S. 49:214.5.3, and R.S. 49:214.5.3(E)

== Opposition ==
Opponents to artificial reefs vary in their reasoning. Some materials have shown to not be suitable for artificial reefs because they are not "risk-free". Tires can become dislodged by storms, especially during extreme weather like hurricanes, and can potentially damaging natural coral reefs. Material erosion can result in toxic chemicals leaching into the water. Marine life can become entangled in the loose debris. In 1972 Firestone donated approximately 2,000,000 tires used at the "Osborne Reef" around a mile off the coast of Florida. Jack Sobel, Director of Strategic Conservation Science and Policy for The Ocean Conservancy and author stated, "We've literally dumped millions of tires in our oceans," and "I believe that people who were behind the artificial tire reef promotions actually were well-intentioned and thought they were doing the right thing. In hindsight, we now realize that we made a mistake." While some material or items have shown to be successful like the USS Spiegel Grove, sunk around 6 miles (9.7 km) from Key Largo, there are many things that are unknown like concerns that the reefs will attract the wrong species. The long term effect (100 to 200 years) is unknown, and over-fishing, because the sites are well advertised to attract fishermen.

== List of artificial reefs ==
=== Converted oil platforms ===
As of 2021 oil companies have taken advantage of the Rigs-to-Reefs program with over 600 platforms converted and more than 350 in Louisiana.

- The Lena platform, one of ExxonMobil's decommissioned platforms, located about 50 miles southeast of Grand Isle, was 1,300 foot (400 m), and is the tallest structure to be converted to an artificial reef. The platform is in the Mississippi Canyon Area, Block 280, in 1,000 feet of water. It weighed 27,000 short tons (24,000 t) and when upright was 50 feet taller than the Empire State Building. The platform was also the world's first First Cable-Stabilized Platform. Decommissioning began in 2017
- Grand Isle #9: In 1999, the Louisiana Artificial Reef Program created the world's largest artificial reef by area. Created from the Freeport Sulfur Mine off Grand Isle, Louisiana the reef is made up of more than 68 structures with over 1.5 miles of bridgework. The reef is in 42–50 feet of water with 27 feet (8.2 m) of clearance.

=== Nearshore reefs ===
Louisiana Artificial Reef Program

Nearshore Reefs

Name	Water body	Donor/partner	Structure	Latitude/Longitude	Notes
Ship Shoal 108	Cocodrie	LDWF	SS LDWF ‐108 LS	28˚50.781' 91˚ 07.690'	Located 35 nm southwest of Cocodrie, Louisiana, off the coast of Terrebonne Parish.
Ship Shoal 94	Cocodrie	LDWF	SS LDWF ‐94 RM	28˚52.072' 90˚ 51.190'	Located 25 nm southwest of Cocodrie, Louisiana, off the coast of Terrebonne Parish.
South Marsh Island 233 East	Intracoastal City	Coastal Conservation Association (CCA)	SM ‐233 E deploy	29˚19.225' 92˚ 08.000'	
South Marsh Island 233 West	Intracoastal City	CCA	SM‐233 W deploy	29˚19.388' 92˚ 08.626'	
South Timbalier 51	Cocodrie	CCA	ST‐51 RCS	28˚53.029' 90˚ 29.057'	
Vermilion‐119 "D"	Intracoastal City	CCA	VR	29˚05.710' 92˚ 30.026'	
Vermilion 119 G	Intracoastal City	CCA	VR‐119 "G"	29˚ 07.234' 92' 30.187'	
Vermilion 124	Intracoastal City	CCA	VR‐124 "E"	29˚05.229' 92˚ 30.328'	
Vermilion 69	Intracoastal City	CCA	VR‐69 RCS	29˚17.649' 92˚ 15.872'	
West Cameron 45	Cameron	CCA	WC‐45 RCS	29˚40.490' 93˚ 36.458'	
West Delta 23	Venice	CCA	WD‐23 RC	29˚10.800' 89˚ 33.162'	
West Delta 24 RC	Venice	CCA	WD‐24 RC	29˚10.638' 89˚ 32.088'	
Ship Shoal 26	Cocodrie	CCA/Fieldwood Energy LLC	SS-26‐LS‐4	29˚06.505' 91˚ 03.033'	
Ship Shoal 26	Cocodrie	CCA/Fieldwood Energy LLC	SS‐26‐LS‐4	29˚06.287' 91˚ 03.442'	
Ship Shoal 26	Cocodrie	CCA/Fieldwood Energy LLC	TP2‐LS‐1	29˚06.436' 91˚ 03.246'	
Ship Shoal 26	Cocodrie	CCA/Fieldwood Energy LLC	TP3‐LS‐1	29˚06.246' 91˚ 03.112'	
Ship Shoal 26	Cocodrie	CCA/Fieldwood Energy LLC	TP‐LS‐1	29˚06.544' 91˚ 03.488'	
Bay Marchand 3	Fourchon	Chevron USA, Inc/CCA	BM‐3 "M"	29˚ 03.187' 90˚ 10.215'	
Bay Marchand 3	Fourchon	CCA	BM‐3 RCS	29˚03.184' 90˚ 10.152'	
South Timbalier 86	Fourchon	Odeco	ST Odeco ‐86 "A"	28˚46.763' 90˚ 14.060'	
Grand Isle 9	Grand Isle	Freeport McMoRan	#02	29˚11.540' 89˚ 53.493	
Grand Isle 9	Grand Isle	Freeport McMoRan	#08	29˚ 11.380' 89˚ 53.282'	
Grand Isle 9	Grand Isle	Freeport McMoRan	#21	29˚ 11.138' 89˚ 53.114'	
Grand Isle 9	Grand Isle	Freeport McMoRan	#31	29˚ 11.526' 89˚ 53.458'	
Grand Isle 9	Grand Isle	Freeport McMoRan	#57	29˚ 11.226' 89˚ 53.721'	
Grand Isle 9	Grand Isle	LDWF	#58	29˚ 11.228' 89˚ 53.499'	
Grand Isle 9	Grand Isle	LDWF	GI‐9‐RM‐1	29˚11.541' 89˚ 53.224'	
Nickel Reef	Cote Blanche Bay	LDWF	Shell	29˚25.167' 91˚ 42.450'	
Rabbit Island Pass	Cote Blanche Bay	LDWF	Shell	29 25.617' 91˚ 42.450'	

Raising Cane's Hotel Sid reef, located in the South Marsh Island Block 233 is a shallow artificial reef: A partnership between the Coastal Conservation Association (CCA) of Louisiana and Todd Graves, founder of Raising Cane's, who donated $500,000 to create an artificial reef named Raising Cane's Hotel Sid reef. The reef is a combined partnership between the CCA's REEF Louisiana Program, Danos Ventures (Amelia, Louisiana) and Climate technology company Natrx (Raleigh, North Carolina) the Louisiana Department of Wildlife and Fisheries (LDWF), Chevron, CCA’s Building Conservation Trust and Shell. The site is located where the platform Hotel Sid once stood. The platform removal destroyed an unintentional reef and the new reef is intended to mitigate that loss. The reef material, called Cajun Coral, are 3D printed concrete modules that allows project-specific ExoForms to be created.
