= Rigs-to-Reefs =

Artificial reefs from old oil rigs

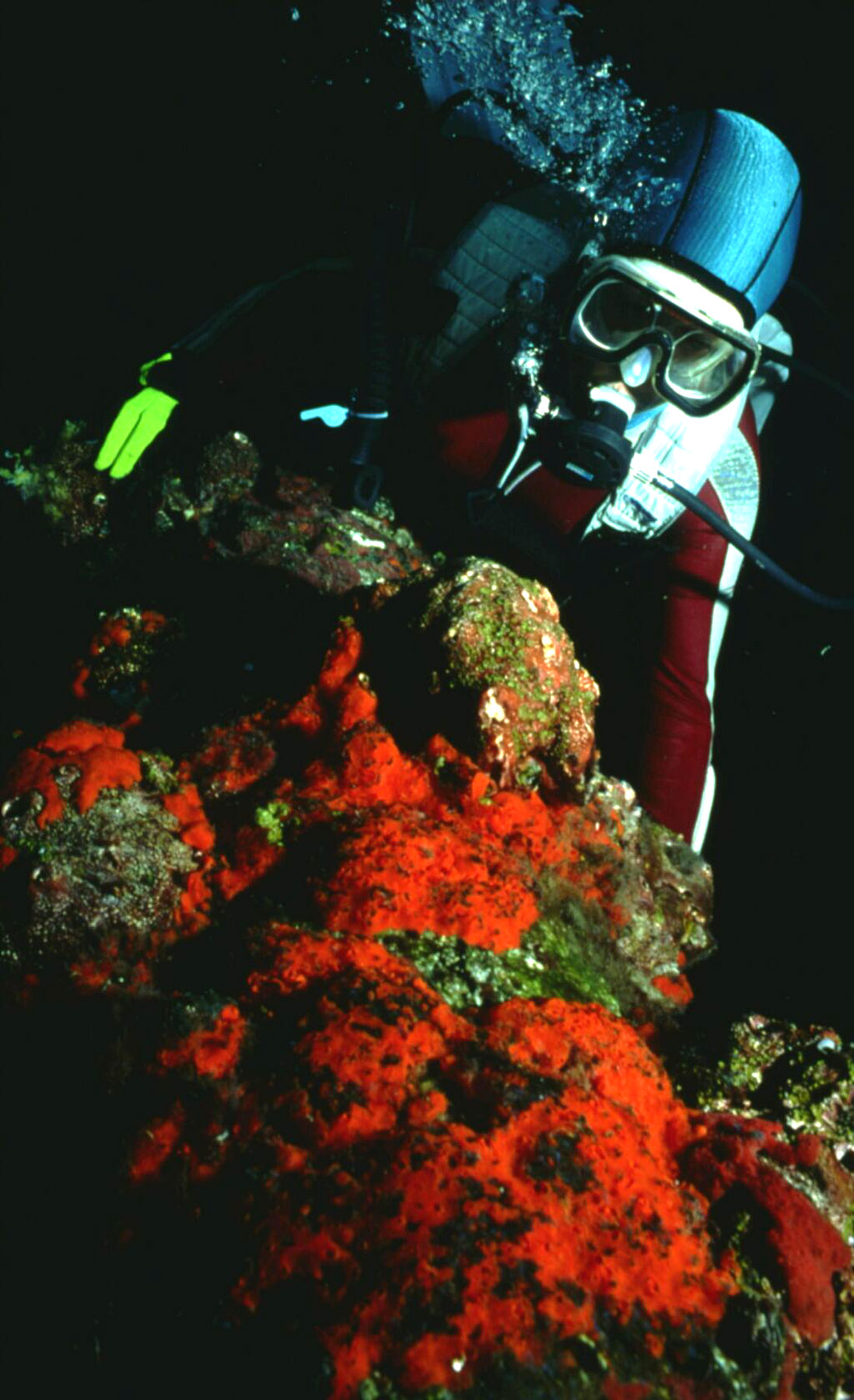
A diver inspects coral growing on an oil platform leg, Gulf of Mexico (US Bureau of Ocean Energy Management).

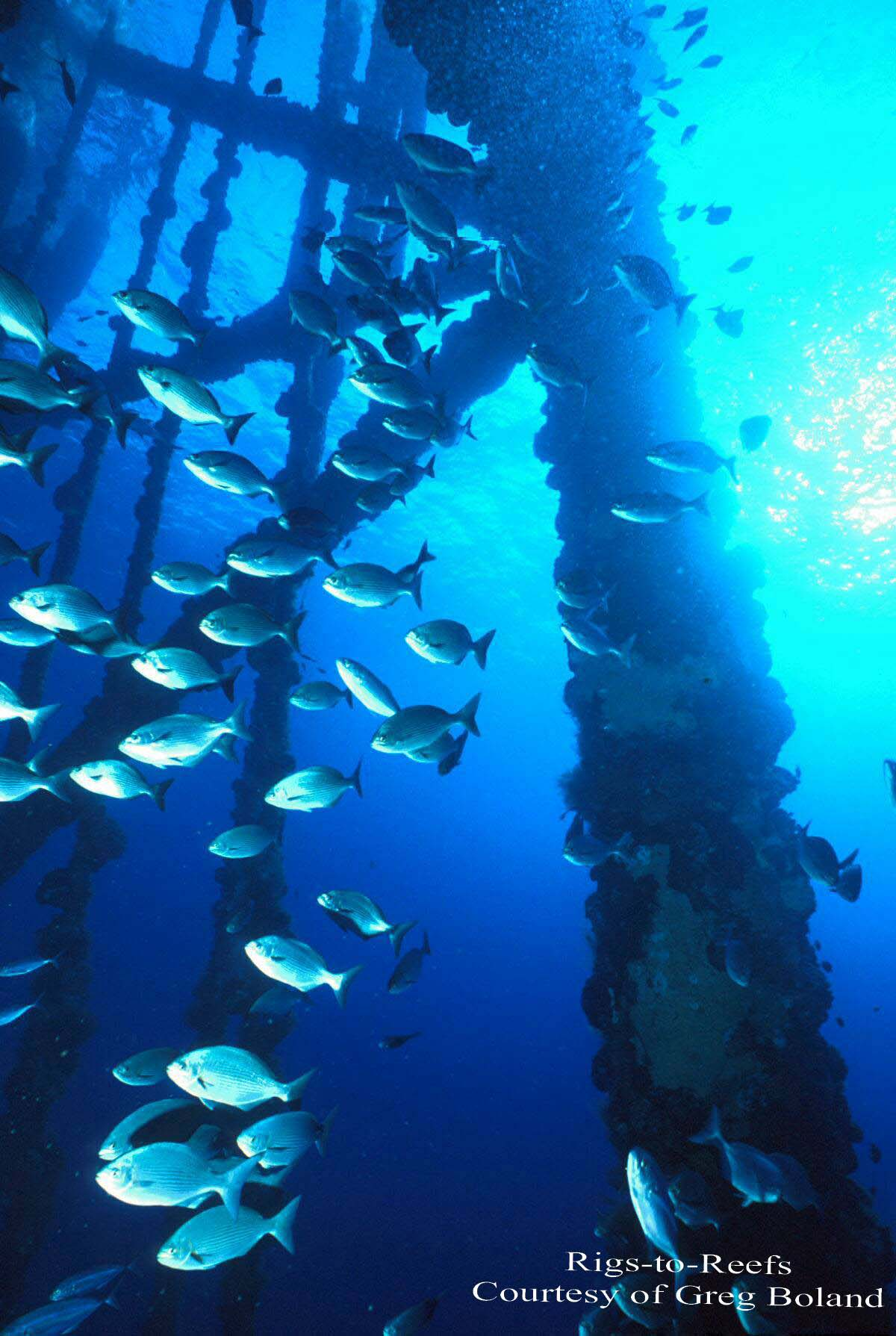
Fish at an oil platform, Gulf of Mexico (US Bureau of Ocean Energy Management)

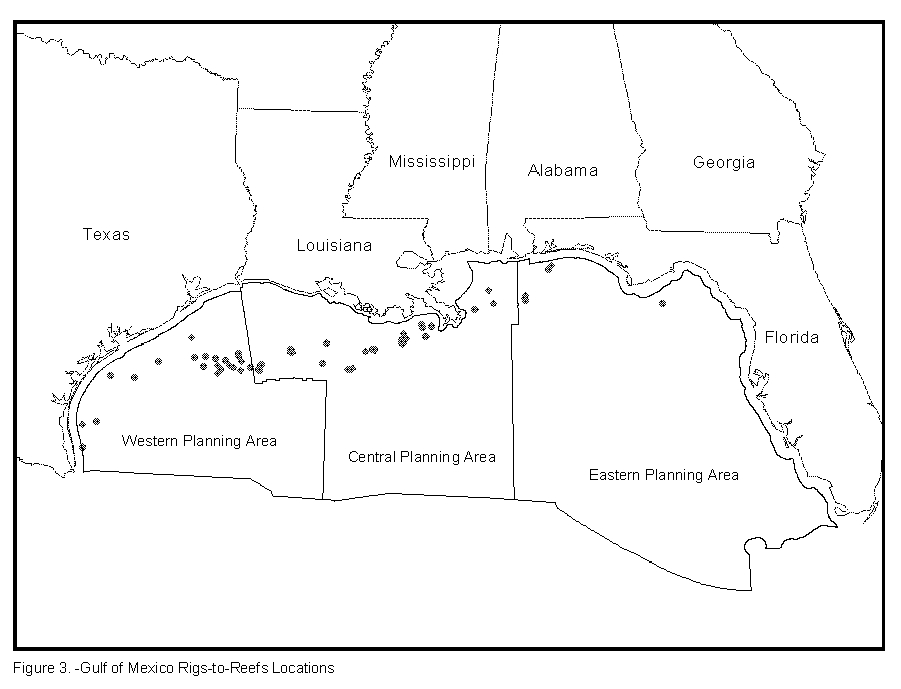
Rigs-to-reef locations in the Gulf of Mexico (Dauterive, 2000)

Rigs-to-Reefs (RTR) is the practice of converting decommissioned offshore oil and petroleum rigs into artificial reefs. Such biotic reefs have been created from oil rigs in the United States, Brunei and Malaysia. In the United States, where the practice started and is most common, Rigs-to-Reefs is a nationwide program developed by the former Minerals Management Service (MMS), now Bureau of Safety and Environmental Enforcement (BSEE), of the US Department of the Interior.

The program has been generally popular with fishers, the oil industry, and government regulators in the Gulf of Mexico, where offshore platforms develop into coral reefs, and as of September 2012, 420 former oil platforms, about 10 percent of decommissioned platforms, have been converted to permanent reefs.

Opposition in California has prevented a rigs-to-reefs program on the West Coast of the US. Similarly, environmental opposition has prevented implementation of Rigs-to-Reefs in the North Sea.

== Overview ==
Inevitably, marine organisms attach themselves to the underwater portions of oil production platforms, transforming them into artificial reefs.

These platforms continue to function as long as the reservoirs underneath them provide oil at a profitable rate. At the end of their productive lives they must be decommissioned and removed (in the US within one year). An alternative to removal is to turn the rig into a reef through the Rigs-to-Reef (RTR) program. All coastal states in the US have such artificial reef programs in the interest of increasing ocean fisheries but not all participate in RTR. The rig's steel structures are stable and durable. They create shelter for marine life in open waters where there was none.

Note that production platforms are often called "rigs"; that terminology is used occasionally in this article—and indeed in the term Rigs-to-Reefs. Within the industry, "rig" refers to an apparatus with a derrick that can drill and service wells. (Most production platforms do not have such equipment installed.)

== Process ==
Once a rig stops producing at economic rates, the site is usually abandoned. In the United States, the Minerals Management Service (MMS) requires the operator to remove the rig within a year of abandonment (stopped production) and lease end. MMS supports and encourages RTR as an alternative to total removal. RTR recognizes that during a rig's productive years, significant marine life comes to live on and around its structure. RTR preserves much of that marine life and encourages further growth. The operator benefits by avoiding the substantial cost of removal. Cumulative costs of removal had reached an estimated $1 billion by the year 2000. The shape and complexity of the structure may lead to significant species diversity.

=== Decommissioning a platform ===
Officially, decommissioning an oil rig is the act of removal according to regulatory requirements and includes flushing, plugging and cementing wells to make them safe. Decommissioning is complicated by factors such as cost, safety, operational duration, environmental issues, risk, experience, and historical relationship between operator and state.

As part of decommissioning, the operator must deal with the shell mound that collects on the bottom surrounding the rig. The mound forms on the pile of cuttings discharged from the original drilling operations, shells that have fallen from the platform's underwater structure, and material that has fallen and/or leaked from the platform, occasionally mixed with well seepage. Mounds can contain significant levels of toxic metals including, arsenic, cadmium, chromium, copper, nickel, PCBs, lead, zinc, and poly-nuclear hydrocarbons. Removing the rig structure does not eliminate the need to address the mound.

The method of decommissioning depends on water depth and structure type and is a three-step process that includes planning, permitting, and implementation. A party other than the operator usually administers the process.

In Louisiana, costs as well as the risk involved are the primary factors in determining how to decommission rigs. If the savings are large enough, the operator typically chooses reefing and donates 1/2 the savings to maintain the reef. Decommissioning a shallow water rig typically costs $10–15 million so the amounts can be substantial. The Louisiana Artificial Reef program from its inception through 1998 received roughly $9.7 million in donations and has not taken taxpayer money.

=== Methods of reefing ===
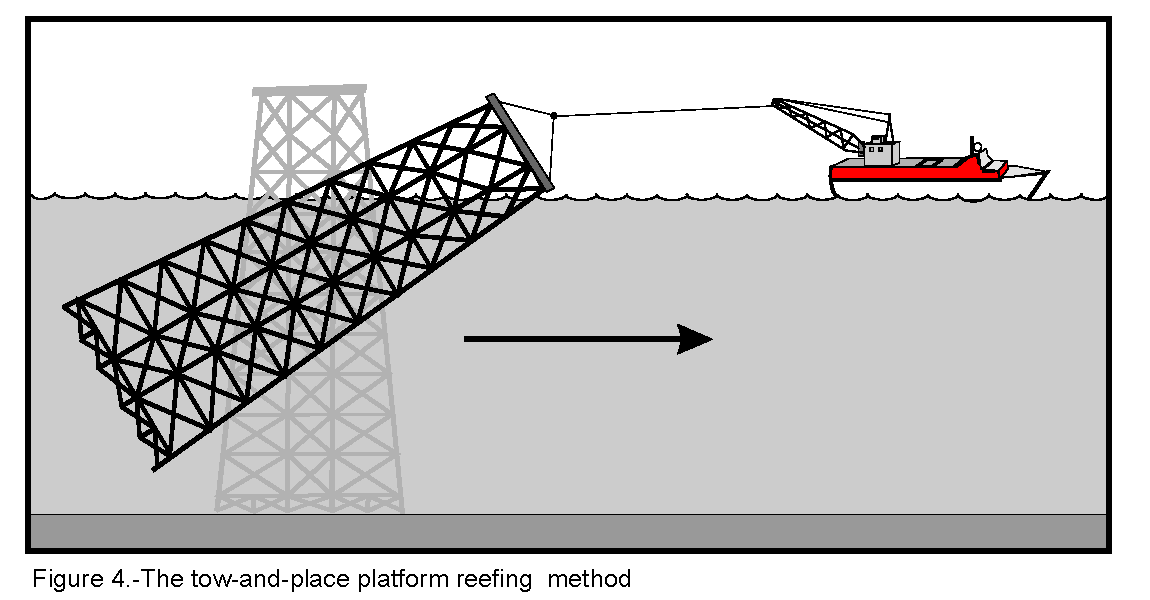
Method of rig-to-reef conversion by tow and place

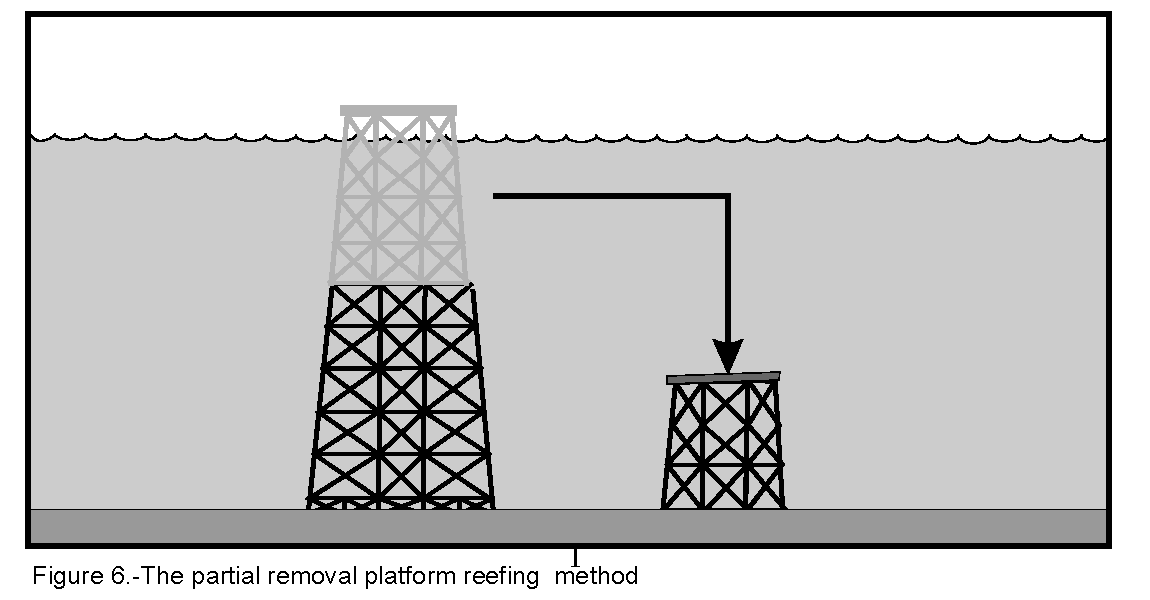
Method of rig-to-reef decommissioning by partial removal

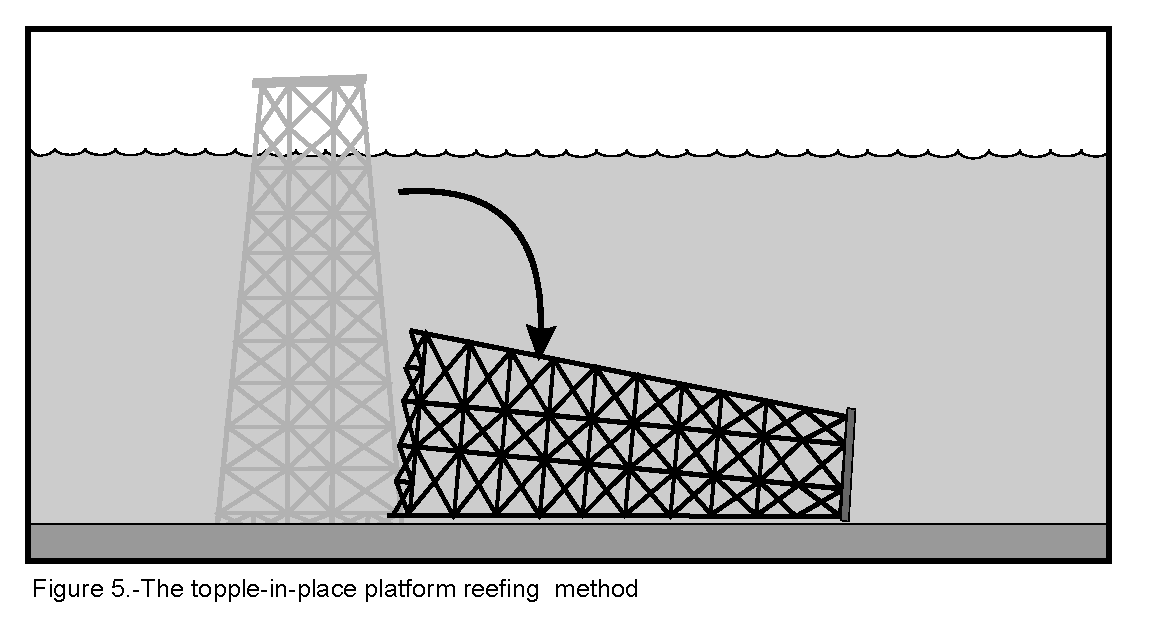
Method of rig-to-reef decommissioning by toppling in place

Severing the rig from the bottom using explosives is the easiest approach, but has the potential to harm marine life. This potential is greatly reduced if the explosives are all placed deep below the seafloor. Current requirements place the explosives a minimum of 5 metres (16 ft) below the seafloor which eliminates the threat to all but the closest sea turtles. National Oceanographic and Atmospheric Administration (NOAA) National Marine Fisheries Service (NMFS) marine observers and helicopter surveys hours preceding the event keep most sea turtles away from the area. Alternatively, commercial divers can use mechanical and abrasive cutters, which preserves marine life, but places the divers at considerable risk.

Reefing involves one of four methods:

- Tow and Place: Sever the structure from the sea floor and tow it to a state-approved location.
- Partial Removal: Remove the top portion of the submerged platform and either remove to the shore for salvage or place it on the sea floor nearby or at another site. Partial removal can result in a loss of the shell mound community and fish that live in the top section but the rest (the majority) of the habitat remains intact.
- Toppling: Toppling involves uses explosives to sever the base of the structure below the mud line in a matter such that it simply falls over. Toppling eliminates shallow and mid-ocean habitats. These portions of the rig are quickly occupied by other creatures.
- Augmentation and Integration: Augmentation and Integration involves adding additional structure to the reef site to enhance its value as a habitat and deliver additional ecosystem services.

== United States ==
Offshore drilling began in California in the late 1800s from piers built out over the ocean. The United States began extracting oil offshore in the early 20th century and the first offshore oil platform in the Gulf of Mexico was built in 1947 off the Louisiana coast. "Today over 4,500 offshore oil and gas platforms have been installed supplying 25% of the United States' production of natural gas and 10% of its oil."

The US Congress passed the Outer Continental Shelf Lands Act (OCSLA) in 1953, to control leasing of exploration rights in the Outer Continental Shelf (OCS). The OCSLA did not contain any real environmental provisions associated with drilling and the 1969 Santa Barbara oil spill triggered the National Environmental Policy Act (NEPA), which required that every major federal action (i.e.: oil exploration on the OCS) required an Environmental Impact Statement (EIS). In 1982, The US Department of the Interior created the Minerals Management Service (MMS) to monitor development on the Outer Continental Shelf. The MMS leases submerged federal lands and assesses the environmental effects of exploration and drilling (by issuing an EIS). In 1984 Congress passed the National Fishing Enhancement Act (NFEA) which provided the basis for artificial reef programs. The NFEA spawned the National Artificial Reef Plan of 1985. This plan cleared the way for government-endorsed artificial reef projects and subsequently the Minerals Management Services' Rigs-to-Reef program.

Following a number of hurricanes from 2004 to 2008, including Katrina, Ike, Ivan, and Rita, that damaged oil production platforms, offshore oil operators filed numerous applications to abandon unused platforms in place. The federal government responded by placing a moratorium on Rigs-to-Reefs, and requiring unused platforms to be speedily decommissioned by removal. In June 2013, the BSEE lifted its moratorium on Rigs-to-Reefs, subject to Coast Guard determination that the structure would not pose a threat to navigation, and acceptance of ownership and liability by the state government.

If the Rigs-to-Reefs option is expected to be less expensive than removal, the platform owner pays half the estimated savings to the state agency receiving the former platform.

=== Gulf of Mexico ===
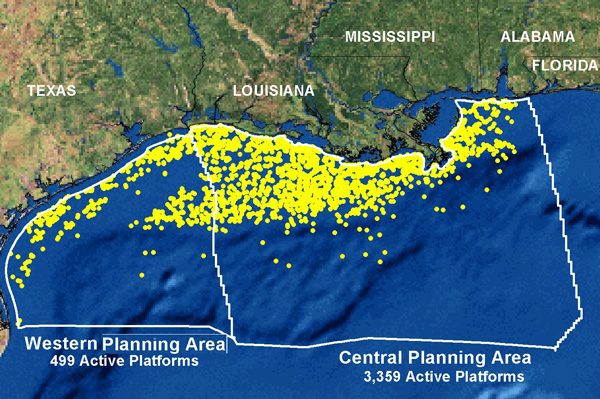
NOAA map of the 3,858 oil and gas platforms extant in US federal waters of the Gulf of Mexico in 2006

The more than 4,500 oil production platforms in the US portion of the Gulf of Mexico are the largest concentration of offshore platforms in the world, having more offshore platforms than the rest of the world combined. The oil production platforms in the Gulf have also been called the largest artificial reef complex in the world.

In 1979, Exxon relocated their experimental subsea production system from offshore Louisiana to a permitted artificial reef site off Apalachicola, Florida. The first platform jacket was donated by Tenneco and towed from Louisiana to Pensacola, Florida.

By 2000, 151 platforms had been converted to permanent reefs. Of these, 90 were towed to new locations and 61 were abandoned in place. Louisiana had 94 of the platforms-turned reefs, Texas 50, Alabama 4, and Florida 3. Florida, which has a long-standing ban on offshore oil production, has requested and received a number of decommissioned oil platforms for creation of artificial reefs in Florida state waters.

=== Offshore California absence ===
No oil platforms have been converted to artificial reefs in offshore California, the only other offshore oil-producing area in the contiguous 48 states. The California legislature passed a bill allowing conditional partial removal of oil platforms in 2010, and the measure was signed by Governor Arnold Schwarzenegger. A.B. 2503 "allows a platform owner or operator to design a 'partial removal' plan for a platform and to apply for permission to implement it". The plan requires the approval of three agencies: The Department of Fish and Game (DFG), The Department of Ocean Protection Council (OPC), and the California State Lands Commission.

As of 2026, no oil platforms have been converted to permanent reefs. A number of reasons have been cited for this, primarily the strength of the environmental movement in California, its antagonistic relationship with the oil industry, and its reluctance to support any measure that would financially benefit the offshore oil industry.

== Brunei ==
Brunei has had a rigs-to-reefs policy since 1988. Offshore operator Shell Brunei Petroleum has towed numerous old platforms and jackets to two designated artificial reef areas located away from shipping lanes.

== Malaysia ==
The Baram-8 platform was damaged in a storm and collapsed to the seabed in 1975. It was made into an artificial reef. As of 2013, Malaysia has no rigs-to-reefs program, but was studying the Baram-8 reef as an example.

In 2017, Dana and D30 Platform was laid out for rigs-to-reef in offshore Sarawak.

== North Sea absence ==
Studies have concluded that oil platforms in the North Sea attract fish, and that a rigs-to-reefs policy there would benefit fishers. The highly publicized occupation of the Brent Spar North Sea oil platform by Greenpeace in 1995 has been highly influential in Europe. Despite scientific findings of the potential value of rigs-to-reefs in the North Sea, the Oslo-Paris Commission (OSPAR), which has jurisdiction over North Sea oil development, has blocked rigs-to-reefs.

== Debates ==
Opposition to, and also support for, Rigs-to-Reefs comes from environmentalists, fishers, oil companies, marine scientists and others. California and the North Sea are each debating RTR. In California, legislation was proposed during the 2010 session to clear legal hurdles for RTR; the Coastal Commission held hearings, but then the legislation was tabled. Even with the RTR successes in the Gulf of Mexico and Philippines, differences in terrain, government entities, and concerned citizens generated conflict.

=== Fisheries ===
Some point out that the title "Rigs-to-Reefs" is somewhat of a misnomer. As Milton Love, a biologist with the UC Santa Barbara Marine Science Institute noted, the oil production platforms are not just potential artificial reefs: "They are in fact artificial reefs right now." The question to Rigs-to-Reef supporters is whether it is good public policy to remove established artificial reefs.

A 2000 MMS report lists research that shows fish densities 20 to 50 times higher around oil and gas platforms than in nearby open water. Divers assess fish populations surrounding platforms. The report encourages recreational fisherman, divers and others who benefit from the increased density. Opponents claim that the greater density comes from an influx of nearby fish rather than increased total population. Research on rockfish populations on oil rigs offshore California supports both theories. In the North Sea, lumpsuckers have been found to use platforms for reproduction, brooding eggs directly on the structure itself.

The high fish populations make both active and inactive oil platforms in the Gulf of Mexico and offshore California popular destinations for sport fishers and the charter fishing industry. The diversity of aquatic life on and near the platforms attracts recreational divers. These groups tend to support Rigs-to-Reefs, and fear the loss of coral and fish habitat if the oil platforms are removed.

Commercial fishing for red snapper in the Gulf of Mexico is seen as highly dependent on oil platform habitat, which provides a hard substrate for aquatic life that is otherwise scarce in much of the Gulf. Bob Shipp, chairman of the University of South Alabama Department of Marine Sciences, and director of the Alabama Center for Estuarine Studies, would like to see 100 percent participation in Rigs-to-Reefs, and said of removing unused oil rigs from the Gulf: "As a fisheries scientist, I think it's a very big mistake." He elaborated:

(The rigs) are all essential habitat really, from the mouth of the (Mississippi) River to (South) Padre Island, snapper are totally reliant upon artificial structure. Before the 1940s, when those rigs started going in, there was practically no snapper in the northwest Gulf. Now, more than half of the catch is from that area.

Those commercial fisherman who trawl generally oppose Rigs-to-Reefs because their nets may snag a rig, creating a hazardous situation. This is particularly the case in offshore California with bottom trawling commercial fishers, who can foul their nets on the shell mounds that build up on the sea floor near the rig. Several fisherman have reported tangling their nets on submerged rigs.

=== Liability ===
Navigational mishaps and diving accidents may also occur around an artificial reef. Gulf of Mexico Rigs-to-Reefs participants have not yet reported any liability problems.

Rigs-to-Reefs was first explored in 1979 when the first oil rig was transported from Louisiana to a Florida site. This rig was the first of 5 Rigs-to-Reefs towed to Florida's coast. Louisiana was the first state to develop a program that allowed transfer of liability and ownership from the operator to the state. Texas later followed this example. Rigs-to-Reef is now the core of both Louisiana and Texas' artificial reef programs.

Under the original guidelines, the Minerals Management Service would not release an operator from liability unless another entity accepts ongoing liability for the rig. If the reef is in state waters, the state typically accepts liability. In federal waters, liability typically goes to a private entity or to another MMS-approved agency. Critics claim that the primary reason that operators support RTR is their desire to offload decommissioning costs and liability. In 2001, the California legislature passed, although the governor then vetoed, a bill that would allow operators to transfer liability to another entity, while retaining liability for any pollution from the underlying well.

Under the new policy issued June 2013, oil platforms in the Rigs-to-Reefs program must be deeded, and liability accepted by, the state government.

=== Environmental groups ===
As with cap-and-trade and ecotourism, RTR attempts to enlist the private sector in helping the environment. To many environmentalists, any program which benefits the oil industry, by lower decommissioning costs, is suspect. Some charge that rigs-to-reefs is an excuse for ocean dumping. Environmental groups have long opposed oil companies and frame their critique around distrust of the industry, particularly with regard to Rigs-to-Reefs in offshore California. "No other industry is allowed to leave a toxic mess for the state to manage and maintain at taxpayer expense" said Linda Krop, Chief council for the Santa Barbara-based Environmental Defense Center.

The Environmental Defense Fund supports Rigs-to-Reefs in the Gulf of Mexico, as a way to preserve the existing reef habitat of the oil platforms.

== See also ==
- Sinking ships for wreck diving sites
- Spawning bed
