= Fukara Aqueduct =

Japanese aqueduct

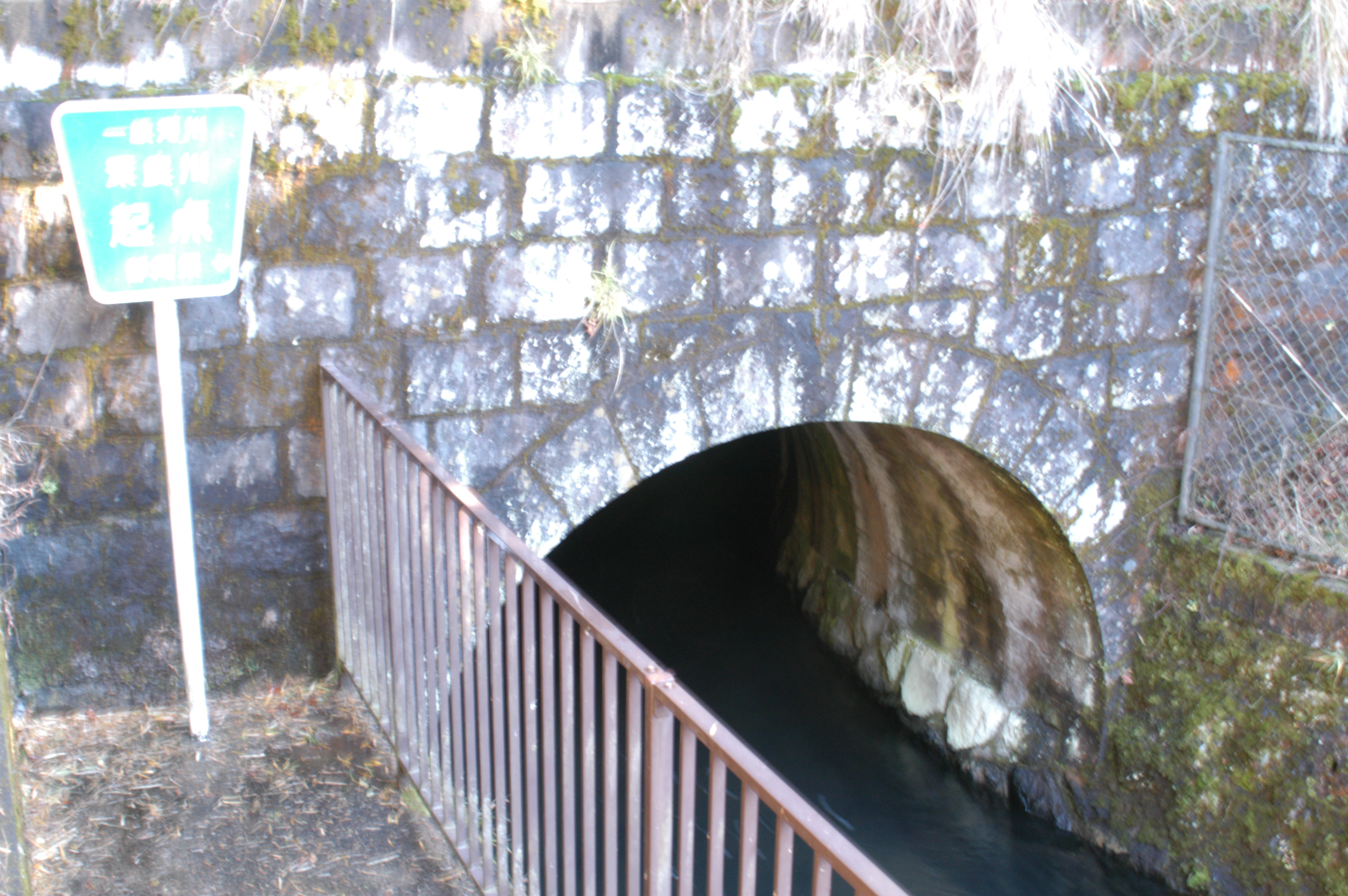
The starting point of the Fukara Aqueduct tunnel on the Lake Ashi side.

Fukara Aqueduct supplies Lake Ashi's water (left) to Fukura Village (right) by a tunnel that was dug through the Mount Hakone's outer rim (center).

Fukara Aqueduct (Japanese: 深良用水, Hepburn: Fukara yōsui) is an aqueduct that draws water from Lake Ashi, in Hakone, Kanagawa, westward to Susono, Shizuoka. Since its completion in 1670, Lake Ashi is emptied by this aqueduct, not by the Haya River. The water rights of Lake Ashi belong to Shizuoka Prefecture, not Kanagawa Prefecture where the lake is located.

Fukara Aqueduct was constructed in 1666-1670 as a tunnel through Mount Hakone's outer rim to provide irrigation to Fukara Village (深良村, 35.2110°N 138.9455°E). The aqueduct becomes the Izumi River (泉川), where its water flows into the Daiba River (大場川), the Kise River (黄瀬川), and the Kano River, before emptying into Suruga Bay.

In March 2020, the "Thanksgiving Festival of Fukara Aqueduct's 350th Anniversary" (ja:深良用水350感謝祭) was held in Susono City.

== See also ==
- Fuji-Hakone-Izu National Park
