= Yamagata Girls Farm =

- Industry: Agriculture
- Founded: April 1, 2009; 17 years ago in Murayama, Yamagata Prefecture, Japan
- Founder: Nahoko Takahashi
- Headquarters: Murayama, Yamagata Prefecture, Japan
- Owner: Nahoko Takahashi
- Number of employees: 6 (2014)
- Website: girlsfarm.jp

Yamagata Girls Farm (山形ガールズ農場 Yamagata Gāruzu Nōjō) is an agricultural organization in the city of Murayama in Yamagata Prefecture, Japan, whose goal is to promote agriculture work amongst young women.

== Description ==
Yamagata Girls Farm lies about 400 km north of Tokyo in Yamagata Prefecture. As of 2014, Yamagata Girls Farm had seven members in their 20s and 30s, all of whom held agriculture degrees, though the farm does not require members to hold a degree. They grew watermelon, spinach, taro, and five kinds of rice, (Note: Until 2013 the farm also grew tomatoes, eggplants, and cucumbers.) from which they also made baked goods to sell. The farm sells its products online and through restaurants and hotels.

== Background ==
As of 2011, agriculture made up 1.2% of Japan's GDP and provided 39% of Japan's food self-sufficiency. Food self-sufficiency was 73% in 1965 and steeply declined as government promotion of manufactured goods led to rapid urbanization and an aging rural population who increasingly had to supplement their incomes with outside work. Young people have tended to avoid agricultural work due to stereotypes of it being laborious and biased against women. Faced with an aging population reliant on food imports, the Japanese government has been prompted to invest in agriculture and to raise awareness of women's rights in farming, such as the rights to land ownership and income.

== History ==
Nahoko Takahashi (Note: 高橋菜穂子 Takahashi Nahoko) returned to her parents' home after graduating from Yokohama National University. Her father was a farmer whom she had helped while growing up. She developed a determination to revitalize Japanese agriculture and founded Yamagata Girls Farm as a corporation employing women in agricultural work, as there were few farms in Japan that welcomed female workers.

As of 2014 Yamagata Girls Farm had yet to turn a profit. The farm was focusing on rice grown with organic methods as a main source of income.

== See also ==
- Women in agriculture in Japan
