= Women in agriculture in Japan =

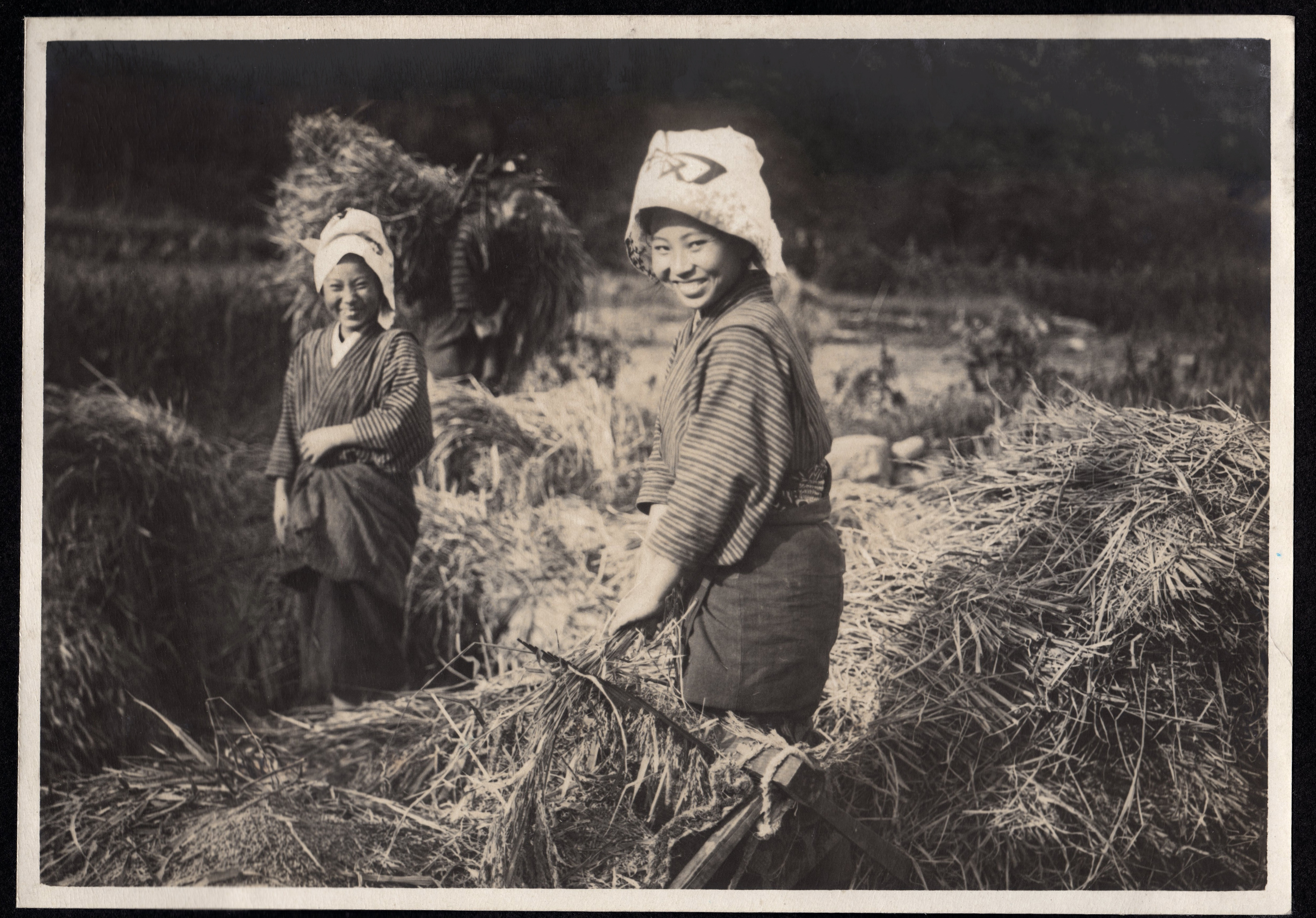
Japanese farmers, c. 1914–1918

Women have always been active in agriculture in Japan. Women farmers have, throughout Japan's history, outnumbered male farmers. Traditionally, women farmers in Japan did farm work and cared for other members of the family. Some held part-time jobs and then came home to do farm work. Most farmland in Japan is used by small family farms, though other types of agricultural collectives are appearing in the country. The Japanese government has been active in encouraging women to go into agriculture in the early 21st century.

== History ==
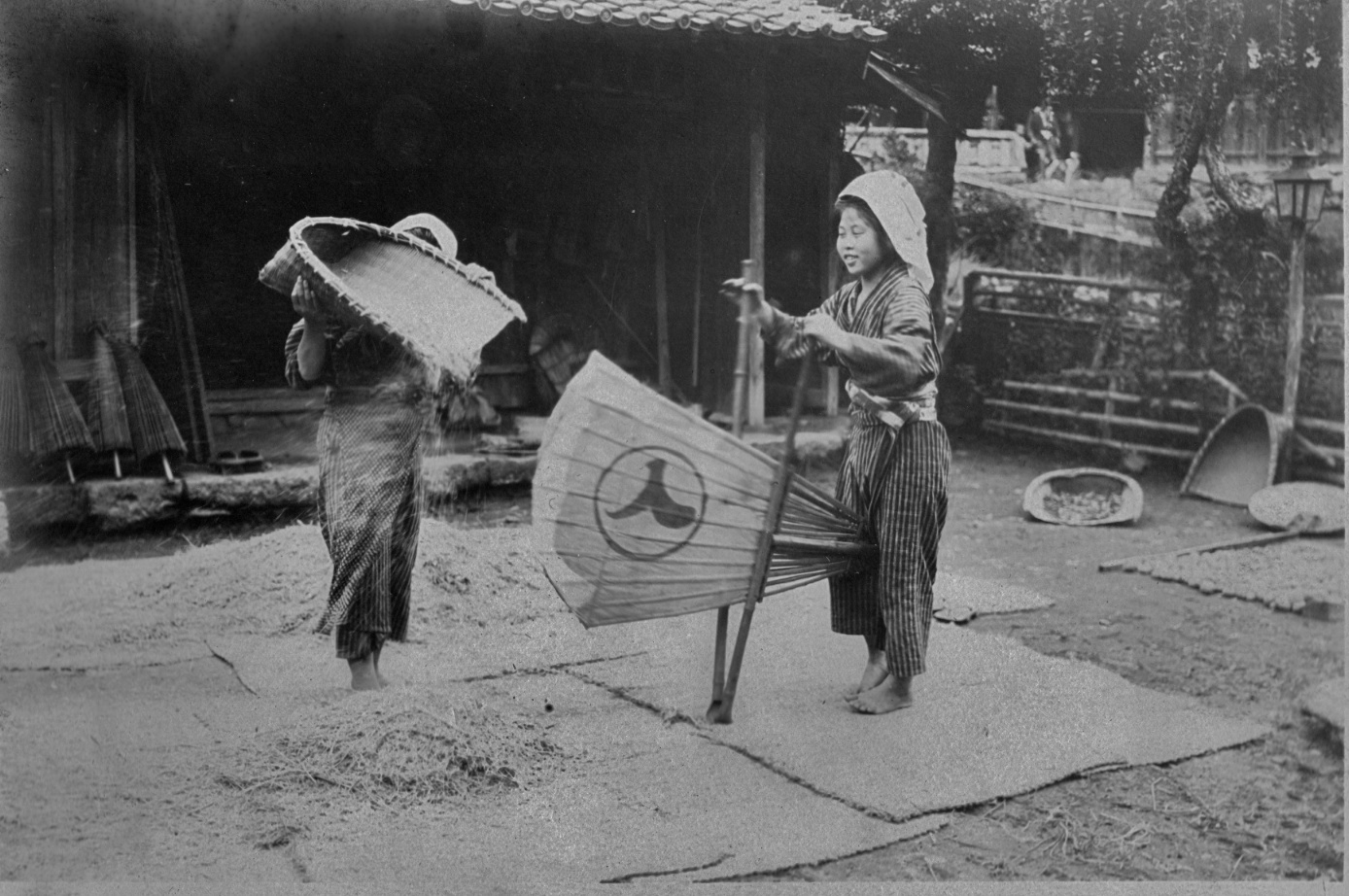
Girls winnowing rice grain. The girl on the left empties a basket of grain, while the one on the right uses a fan to blow the chaff away from the grains as they fall. Circa 1914–1918.

Japan's small family farms are the dominant source of agriculture in the country and, while the number of farmers has declined over the years, women working as farmers still outnumber men.

Small farms were traditionally passed down from the father to the oldest son and women were not often involved in leadership roles on agricultural committees or agricultural cooperatives. Because of this arrangement, agriculture remained a male-dominated industry. Despite women working side by side on the farm, traditionally men and women did not spend much time with one another when not farming. Until recently, women who wanted to become farmers under this traditional model could succeed only by being born into or marrying into an agricultural family. Today, this pattern continues in some areas. Haruna Takano, who set up a farm in Hokkaido with Eri Sawai, asserts that women who want to go into agriculture are encouraged to marry into farming families. Many men also held jobs off of the farm to supplement family income and so women have been expected to contribute significantly to farm work. By 1976, Japanese women farmers were taking part-time jobs in addition to their farm work.

After World War II, agricultural production slowed in Japan. As of 2013, Japanese farmers produced only 39 percent of food demand in Japan. After WWII, many farms owned by non-farming landlords were transferred to former peasant tenants. After the war, women were encouraged to participate in men's organizations but with often with limited privileges.

Many traditional norms continued in Japan after the enactment of the Constitution of 1947. Rural women farmers during this time had a dual role of caring for family members and working on the farm. As women began to work off the farm, they were expected to continue farming.

During the 1980s, there was a large shift in agricultural demographics, with young people, especially young women, leaving farm work and going to work in urban areas.

In 1994, the largest and best-known agricultural network, Rural Heroines (or Inakano Heroine Wakuwaku Network) was formed. Rural Heroines has created a national convention for farming women to network, publishes Heroine News, and organizes local lectures, seminars and produce exchange.

By 1995, farming was changing for women. Younger farming women were considered more independent than in previous generations. In 1996, a school called the Ladies Farm School (Redīsu Fāmu Sukūru) was formed in Hokkaido to train women to become "emancipated farming ladies". The school was created to train women about agriculture and to draw women into rural areas.

After 1999, when the Basic Act for Gender-Equal Society (Danjo Kyōdō Sankaku Shakai Kihon Hō) went into effect, agricultural committees and cooperatives began encouraging women's participation and have increased women's leadership roles in agriculture.

== Modern farming ==
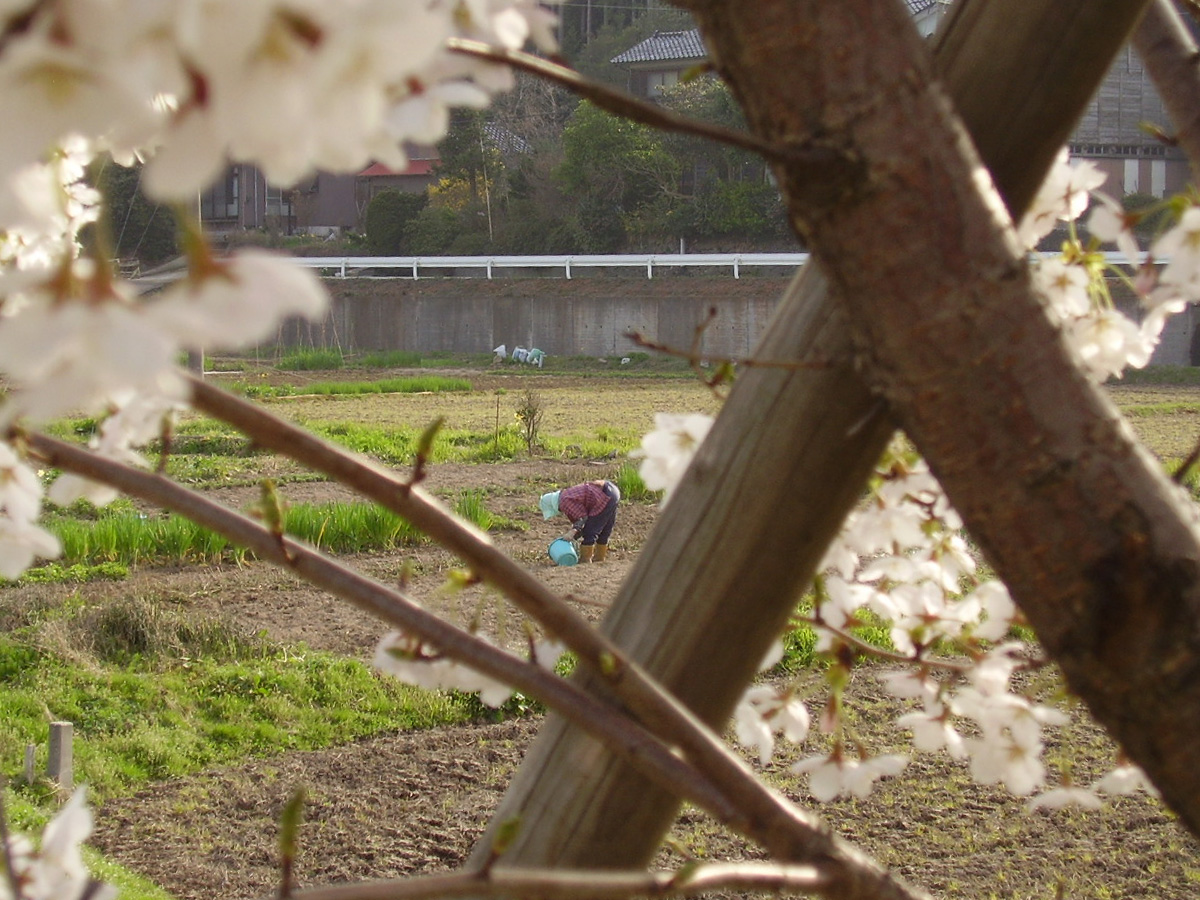
Woman farming in Wajima, 2006

Government data from 2011 showed women heading more than three-quarters of new agribusiness ventures. Many young people in Japan have become attracted to farming and the Japanese government is supporting programs to support new farmers. The government in 2014 began to encourage collaboration between companies and female farmers. Products developed included new trucks, outdoor toilets for women, and stain removers. The government has also encouraged women farmers to network with one another. However, as of 2010, there were few women with executive positions in agricultural cooperatives and women made up only 16% of all members.

Urban farms such as Shiho Fujita's farm outside of Tokyo are part of a collective formed by young women who live in the city and work part-time on the farm. The Yamagata Girls Farm in Yamagata Prefecture encourages women to work in agriculture but insists that women "must wear make-up, they must wear functional but cute farm wear, and they must behave like well-bred young women". Urban women who are interested in farming are known as "farm gals", or nōgyaru.

== See also ==
- Japanese agriculture
