= Haya River (Kanagawa) =

River in Kanagawa prefecture, Japan

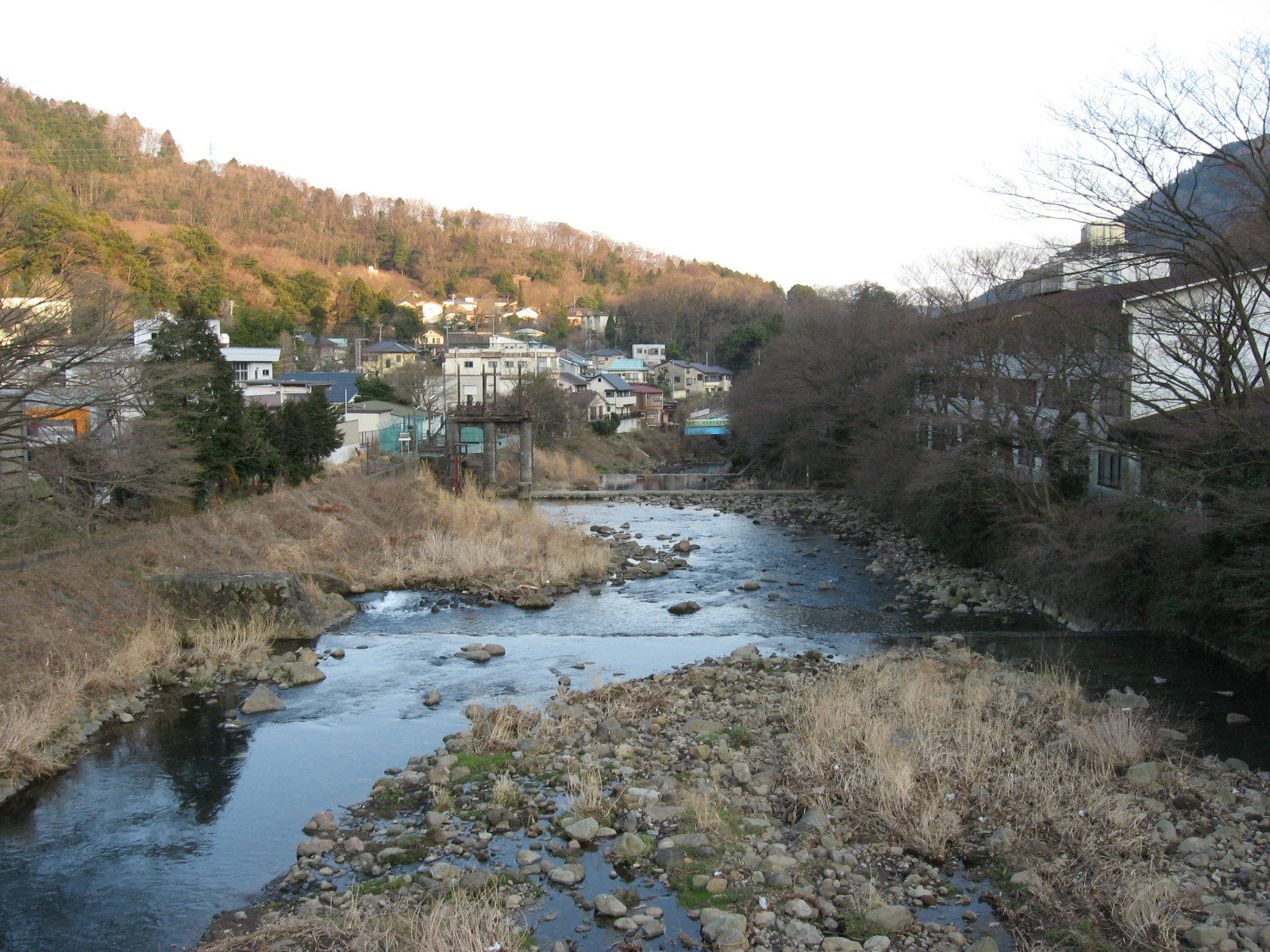

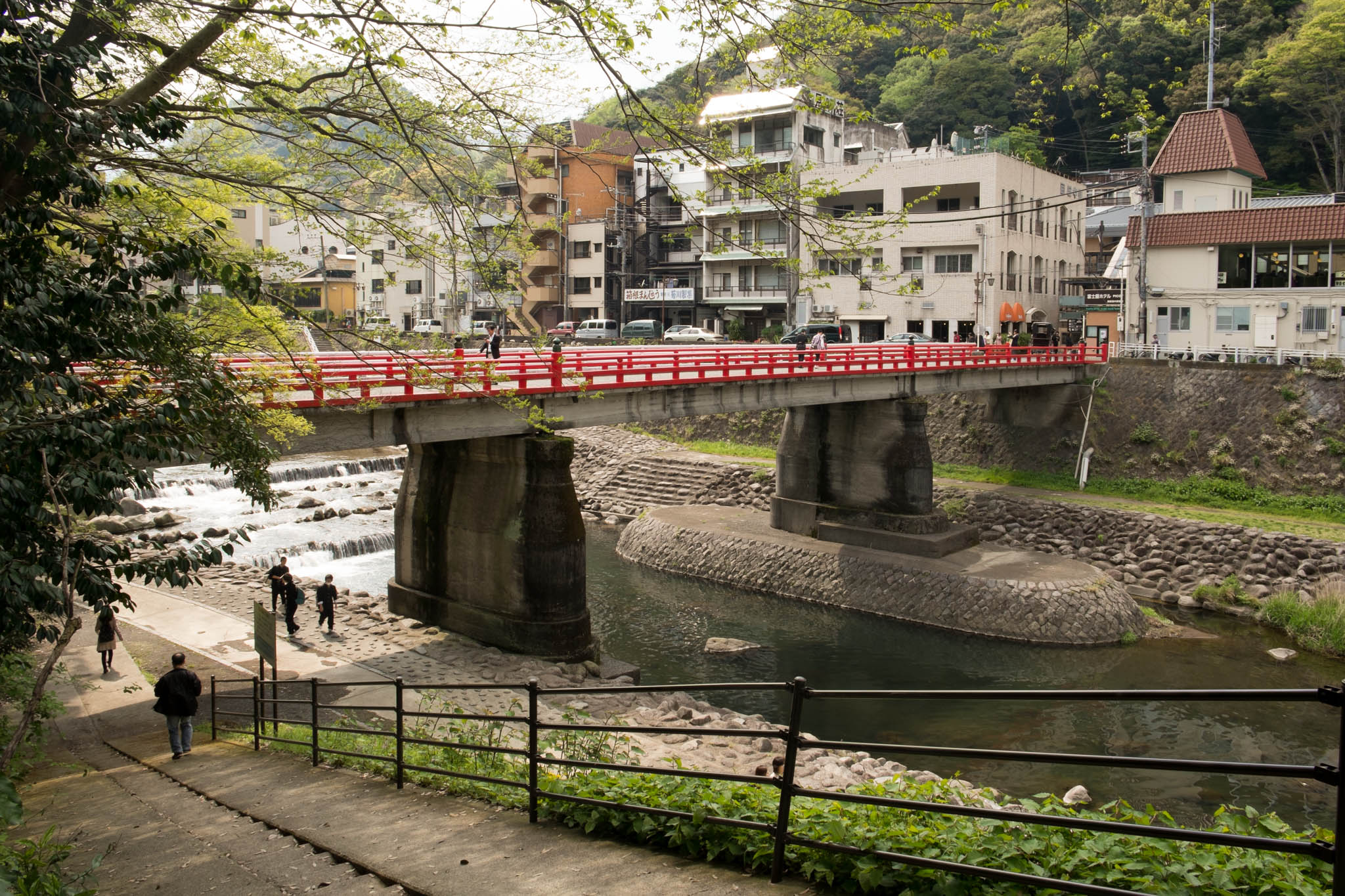
The Haya River near Odakyu Electric Railway's Hakone-Yumoto Station

The Haya River (Japanese: 早川 = Hayakawa, literally a fast-flowing river) is a river that flows in Hakone and Odawara, Kanagawa, Japan. It is a 26 kilometres (16 mi) long river, starting from the Kojiri Water Gate (湖尻水門) at the northern tip of Lake Ashi, gathering rain and hot spring water as it flows in the Sengoku, the Mount Hakone caldera, running down beside the towns of Hakone Hot Springs, and emptying near Odawara Fishing Port (35°14′23.38″N 139°8′50.86″E) into Sagami Bay of the Pacific Ocean.

Lake Ashi is not the source of the Haya River, because it is drained through the Fukara Water Gate to the Fukara Aqueduct, completed in 1676, which leads to Shizuoka Prefecture. The Sukumo River (須雲川) is the Haya's largest tributary. The Chisuji Falls (千条の滝) are on another tributary, the Jakotsu River (蛇骨川).

The Haya is famous for ayu fishing in summer, in its midstream. A section of the Haya near Hakone-Yumoto Station on Odakyu Group's Hakone Tozan Line is known as a place where one can observe fireflies in each June.

The Old Tokaido Highway runs alongside the Hayakawa River, from Itabashi, Odawara, to Miyanoshita, Hakone.

The 2,900 kW Hayakawa Hydroelectric Station is on this river.

== See also ==
- Hakone Onsen
