= National Fishing Enhancement Act of 1984 =

- Other short titles: Antarctic Marine Living Resources Convention Act of 1984
- Long title: A bill to establish national standards for the construction and siting of artificial reefs in the waters of the United States in order to enhance fishery resources and fishing opportunities and for other purposes.
- Acronyms (colloquial): NFEA
- Nicknames: Fishery Conservation and Management Act of 1984
- Enacted by: the 98th United States Congress
- Effective: November 8, 1984

Citations
- Public law: Pub. L. 98–623
- Statutes at Large: 98 Stat. 3394

Codification
- Titles amended: 33 U.S.C.: Navigable Waters
- U.S.C. sections created: 33 U.S.C. ch. 35 § 2101 et seq.

Legislative history
- Introduced in the House as H.R. 5447 by John Breaux (D-LA) on April 12, 1984; Committee consideration by House Merchant Marine and Fisheries, House Public Works and Transportation; Passed the House on October 4, 1984 (Passed voice vote, in lieu of H.R. 6342); Passed the Senate on October 10, 1984 (Passed voice vote, in lieu of H.R. 6342); Signed into law by President Ronald Reagan on November 8, 1984

National Fishing Enhancement Act of 1984 is a federal statute delineating codification for the construction, habitat settings, and monitoring of artificial reefs in the United States maritime boundary. The Act of Congress declares degradation of fishery habitats and overfishing have created a declivity in the shoaling and schooling yields of United States saltwater fish resources. The Act asserts artificial reefs have potential for economic relief concerning the United States coastal economies where aquaculture operations have soaring energy costs adversely burdening their expenditures for the commercial fishing and recreational fishing conservation practices.

The United States House of Representatives bill 5447 was superseded by the U.S. House bill 6342 supporting the governance of the international fishery agreements with Iceland and the European Economic Community. The United States marine conservation decree endorses the Convention for the Conservation of Antarctic Marine Living Resources as an international relations agreement encompassing the Antarctic Treaty System. The United States international fishery agreements foster the regulations and rulings of the Magnuson–Stevens Fishery Conservation and Management Act enacted into law in 1976. The H.R. 6342 title provides a declaration of;

An Act approve governing international fishery agreements with Iceland and the EEC; to establish national standards for artificial reefs; to implement the Convention on Conservation of Antarctic Marine Living Resources; and for the other purposes.

— 98th United States Congress, Fishery Conservation and Management Act of 1984, Congress.gov

The H.R. 6342 legislation, superseding the H.R. 5447 bill, was approved by the 98th United States Congress and enacted into law by the 40th president of the United States Ronald Reagan on November 8, 1984.

== Declaration of the Act ==
The offshore maritime management legislation was authored as a regulatory title as part of the Fishery Conservation and Management Act of 1984. The Act was drafted as eight sections chartering a national artificial reef plan for the offshore aquaculture regions of the United States.

=== Title II - Artificial Reefs ===
33 U.S.C. § 201 ~ Short Title
Title cited as National Fishing Enhancement Act of 1984
33 U.S.C. § 202 ~ Findings and Conclusions
◇ Fishery products provide an important source of nutrition and protein for United States consumption.
◇ United States fishery production annually falls far short of United States demand.
◇ Overfishing and the degradation of fishery resource habitats of United States fishery resources.
◇ Escalated energy costs have had a negative effect on United States commercial and recreational fisheries
◇ Commercial and recreational fisheries are a factor in United States coastal economies
◇ Direct and indirect returns are threefold from United States fishing expenditures
◇ Properly designed, constructed, and located artificial reefs in waters can enhance the habitat of fishery resources.
◇ Enhance United States recreational and commercial fishing opportunities
◇ Increase the production of fishery products in the United States
◇ Increase the energy efficiency of recreational and commercial fisheries
◇ Contribute to the United States and coastal economies
33 U.S.C. § 203 ~ Establishment of Standards
Scientific information available suggests artificial reefs shall be constructed, monitored, and sited which will;
◇ Enhance fishery resources to the maximum extent practicable
◇ Facilitate access and utilization by United States recreational and commercial fishermen
◇ Minimize conflicts among competing uses of waters and resources in such waters
◇ Minimize environmental risks and risks to personal health and property
◇ Consistent with generally accepted principles of international law and shall not create any unreasonable obstruction to navigation
33 U.S.C. § 204 ~ National Artificial Reef Plan
Develop and publish a long-term plan which will meet the purpose of this title and be consistent with the standards established under section 203. The plan must include ~
◇ Biological, ecological, economic, geographic, geologic, hydrographic, research, social, and other criteria for siting artificial reefs
◇ Design, material, and other criteria for constructing artificial reefs
◇ Mechanisms and methodologies for monitoring the compliance of artificial reefs with the requirements of permits issued under section 205
◇ Mechanisms and methodologies for managing the use of artificial reefs
◇ Synopsis of existing information on artificial reefs and needs for further research on artificial reef technology and management strategies
◇ Evaluation of alternatives for facilitating the transfer of artificial reef construction materials to persons holding permits including but not limited to credits for environmental mitigation and modified tax obligations
33 U.S.C. § 205 ~ Permits for Construction and Management of Artificial Reefs
◇ Issuance of permit for artificial reefs under section 10 of the Rivers and Harbors Act of 1899
◇ Issuance of permit under section 402 of the Federal Water Pollution Control Act of 1948
33 U.S.C. § 206 ~ Definitions
◇ Artificial Reef - structure constructed or placed in waters for the purpose of enhancing fishery resources and commercial and recreational fishing opportunities
◇ State - a State of the United States, District of Columbia, Puerto Rico, United States Virgin Islands, American Samoa, Guam, Johnston Island, Midway Island, and Wake Island
◇ Waters Covered Under this Title - navigable waters of the United States and the waters superjacent to the Outer Continental Shelf as defined in section 2 of the Outer Continental Shelf Lands Act of 1953 to the extent such waters exist in or are adjacent to any State
33 U.S.C. § 207 ~ Use of Certain Vessels as Artificial Reefs
◇ National Defense Reserve Fleet
33 U.S.C. § 208 ~ Savings Clauses

== U.S. Maritime Programs Act of 1972 ==
On February 23, 1972, the 92nd United States Congress introduced U.S. House bill H.R. 13324 supporting United States Department of Commerce maritime programs and federal appropriations for the fiscal year 1973. The United States maritime programs appropriations provided an authorization for the submersion of Liberty ships establishing offshore artificial reefs to sustain marine life. The appropriations bill was enacted into law by the 37th president of the United States Richard Nixon on August 22, 1972.

== See also ==
- Artificial reefs in Japan
- Coral reefs of the Virgin Islands
- List of U.S. state artificial reefs program
- Marine ecosystem
- Submerged Lands Act of 1953
