= Artificial reefs in Japan =

Underwater structures to increase sustainable fishing activities

Artificial reefs are used to increase sustainable fishing activities on the coastline of Japan, which depends heavily on the sea for food.

== History ==
Since the Middle Ages Japanese fishermen used immense bamboo structures to enhance the proliferation of fish. The first artificial reefs for which records have been kept dates back to 1650 and written records show that the reefs were in use between 1789 and 1801.

Since 1930 Japan has subsidised the installation of artificial reefs especially from 1952. The Japanese government continues to invest in research and development and financing of major projects. It is a true maritime development program with interests and significant investment of around one billion euros per year.

== Description of facilities ==
In 2004, 12% of the continental shelf of Japan held twenty million cubic metres of artificial reefs of all types particularly metal structures. Concrete blocks are frequently used but also metal towers 35 metres high weighing 92 tons mounted on three discs each three metres in diameter which create walls with currents to block plankton. About 350 models of patented reefs meet the needs of different species and environmental conditions have been constructed at about 20,000 sites in the Japanese archipelago.

Scientific research on the study of the behaviour of fish allow the development of a bio-seabed to assess the needs and capabilities of migration and colonization of native species. These reefs protect and now attract tens of millions of fish and crustaceans. The largest of these reefs measures several thousand cubic metres and is 80 metres high.

== Specially designed habitats ==
Artificial reefs are used by the Japanese to improve coastal fisheries. They build both shallow water reefs (called "tsukiiso") for shellfish and seaweeds and deeper water reefs (called "gyosho") for finfish.

In addition to the roles of hatchery, nursery, and shelter, the reefs serve as relays for sea bream which are produced in the hatcheries and released into open water near the artificial reefs that are home to the adult fish.

Japanese scientists have evidence that specifically designed shallow water reefs can improve survival and growth of juvenile abalone. While the Japanese have been putting millions, and in recent years billions, of dollars into developing sophisticated techniques to create new habitat and increase seafood production. Japan, and more recently Taiwan, have put most of their effort into specifically designed and constructed units.

== Bibliography ==
- Ino, T. 1974. Historical review of artificial reef activities in Japan, In L. Colunga and R. B.Stone (editors), Proceedings of an international conference on artificial reefs, p. 21- 23. Texas A&M University.
- Sheehy, D. J. 1979. Fisheries development: Japan. Water Spectrum 12(1):1-9.
- Sheehy, D. J. 1981. Artificial reef programs in Japan and Taiwan, In D. Y. Aska (editor), Artificial reefs: Conference proceedings, p. 185-198. Fla.
- Sheehy, D. J. 1982. Artificial reefs in Japan, In J. D. Murray (compiler), Mid-Atlantic artificial reef conference a collection of abstracts, p. 7. N.J.
- S. Pioch, JC Raynal, G. Lasserre, Artificial habitats, an evolutionary element of the strategy for integrated coastal zone management, Proceedings of the Japanese-French Symposium of Oceanography, Marseille, 7–9 September 2008, 7 p.
- S. Pioch, JC Raynal, JP Doumenge, Development of Japanese coastal areas. Artificial reefs, an effective way to compensate for the depletion of fish stocks, International Festival of Geography, Saint-Die, 8–10 October 2008
- S. Pioch, Limiting the irreversible decline of exploited coastal stocks? Planning to improve fish production in Japan, Proceedings of the 8th Fishing Measurement forum, French Association of "Halieumétrie" (Fish Measurements), La Rochelle, 19–21 June 2007, p 2.
- S. Pioch, Artificial Reefs and Repopulation in Japan, Paul Valery University lab. Gester, Ifremer, Egis Eau, Montpellier, January–March 2007, 132 p.

== Videography ==
- S. Pioch, S. Bontemps, Board and Lodging for the fish, Thalassa, France 3 and TV5 Monde, 18 April 2008. (in French)

== See also ==
- Fishing industry in Japan
- Artificial reef
- Wildlife corridor
- Habitat
