= Ayu fishing =

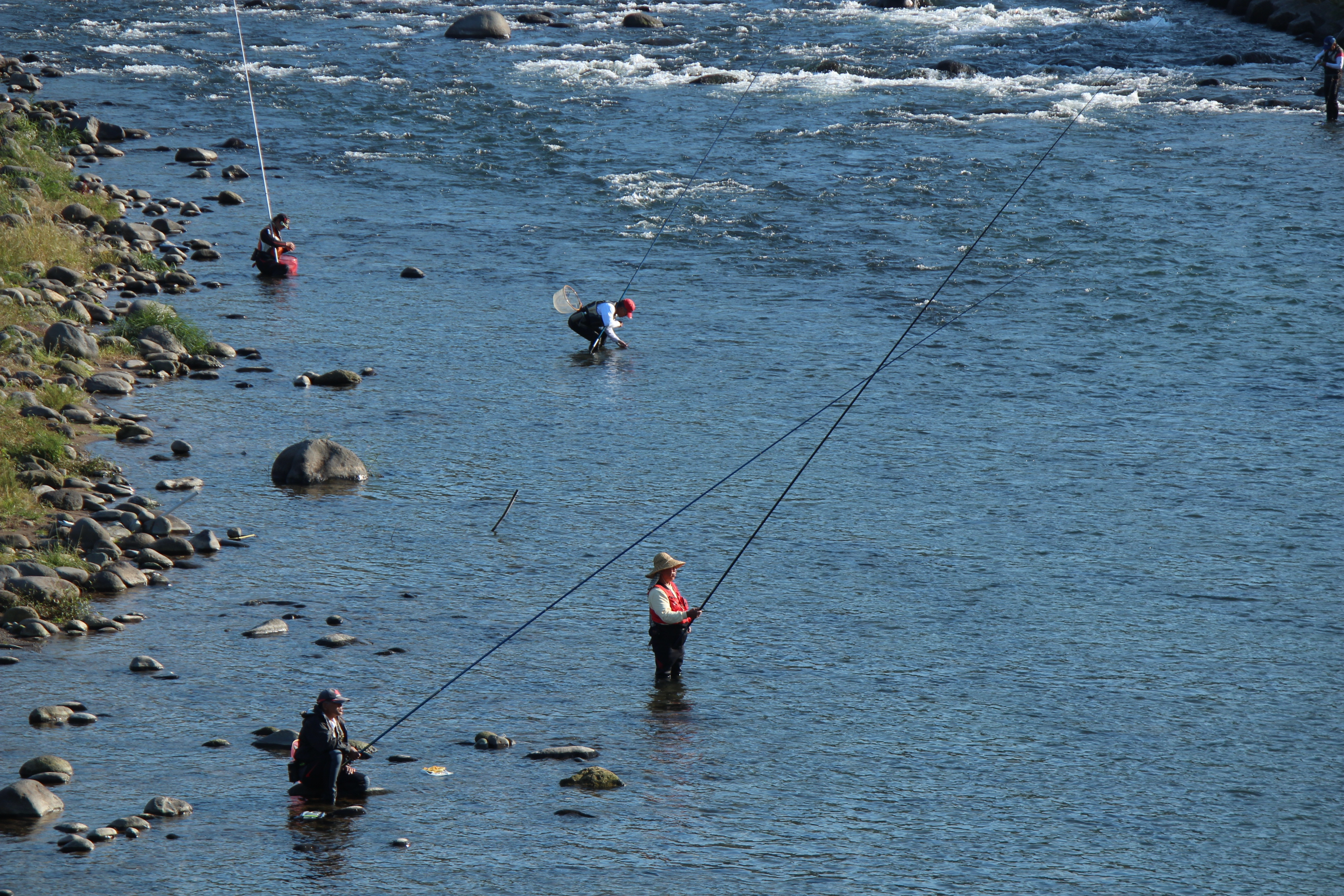
Ayu fishing in Japan.

Ayu fishing is one of the several narrowly defined styles of fishing in Japan.

Ayu fishing was practiced by Samurai as long as 430 years ago. It uses very long rods (7–11 meters) and fly, but fly-casting is not required. Ayu fishing originated at least 430 years ago when anglers discovered they could dress their flies with pieces of fabric and use those to fool the fish. The art became more refined as the samurai, who were forbidden to practice martial arts and sword fighting in the Edo period, found this type of fishing to be a good substitute for their training: the rod being a substitute to the sword, and walking on the rocks of a small stream good leg and balance training. "Only the samurai were permitted to fish. So, the samurai who enjoyed ayu fishing would take sewing needles and bend them themselves, and make their own flies by hand."

Ayu fishing may be done with lures or with a live decoy. As ayu fish are very territorial, they are likely to attack the live decoy fish used as bait. This fishing method based on habit of strife among Ayu is called Tomozuri (ja:友釣り friend fishing) in Japanese and deemed unique in Japan, but research is propagated from Korean Peninsula as well.

Ayu are the second highest species of fish in Japan in terms of released juveniles.

== See also ==
- Ayu sweetfish
