= Bolivar Roads (Texas) =

Natural water inlet in Texas, United States

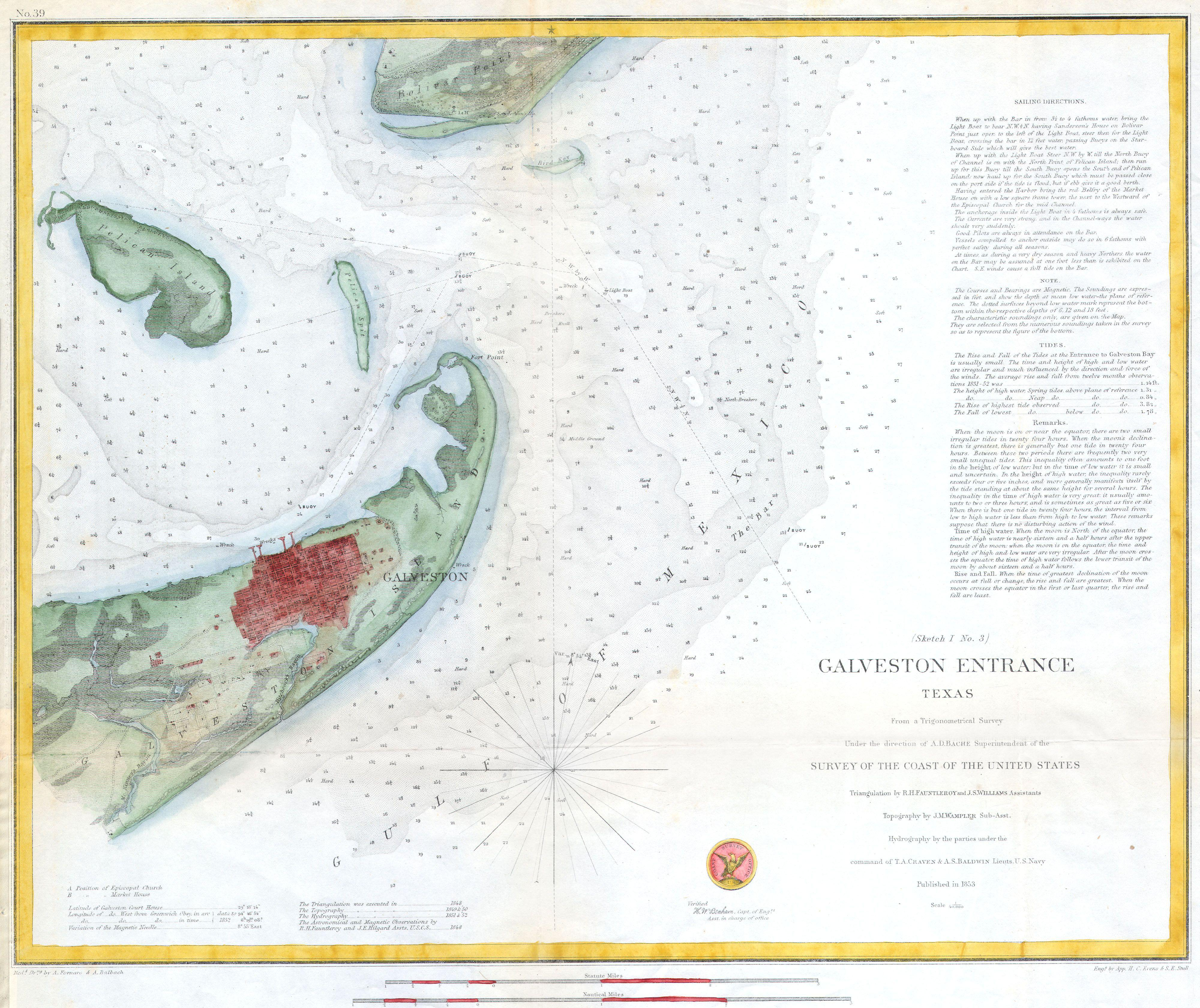

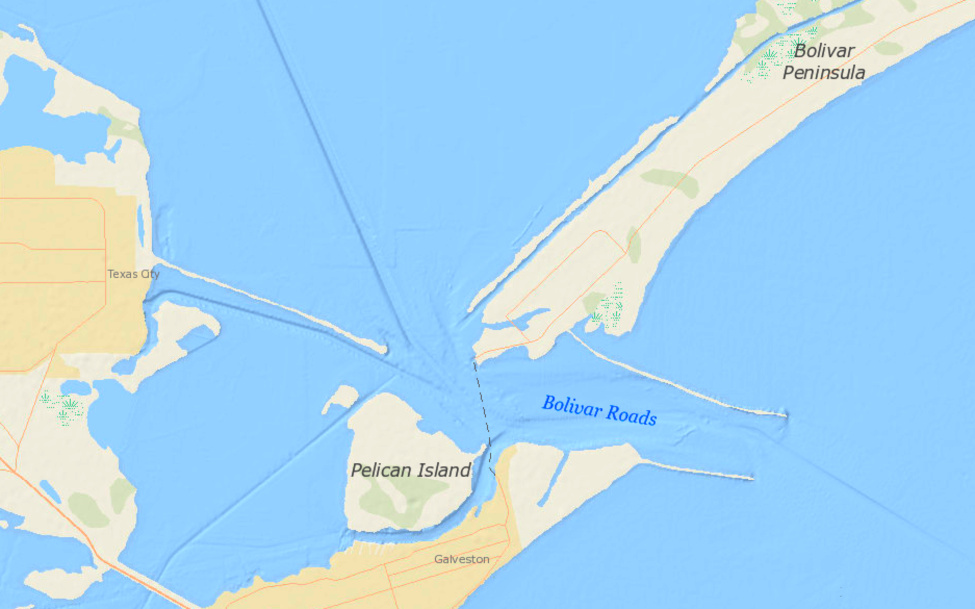
- Illustration of Bolivar Roads to Galveston Bay

- Galveston Bay Entrance Channel
- Location: Bolivar Peninsula - Galveston Island; Galveston County, Texas
- Country: United States
- Coordinates: 29.35051°N 94.75269°W

Specifications
- Length: 11.2 km (7.0 miles) (originally 42.2 km or 26.2 mi) (Morgan's Point)
- Navigation authority: Port of Galveston; Port of Houston
- Jetty Harbor System: Bolivar Peninsula-North Jetty (Map).; Galveston Island-South Jetty (Map).

History
- Former names: Bolivar Roads Channel; Galveston Bay Entrance Channel (Map).; Houston/Galveston Navigation Channel
- Modern name: Doorway to Galveston Bay
- Current owner: State of Texas
- Topo Map: Bolivar Roads (Map).

Geography
- Direction: North
- Start point: Texas Gulf Coast
- End point: Texas City Dike
- Beginning coordinates: 29.334835°N 94.688394°W
- Ending coordinates: 29.362688°N 94.799633°W
- Branches: Galveston Bay; Houston Ship Channel
- Branch of: Galveston Channel (Map).; Inner Bar Channel (Map).; Outer Bar Channel (Map).; Texas City Channel (Map).
- Connects to: Buffalo Bayou; Carpenters Bayou; San Jacinto River
- GNIS feature ID: 1352629; 1384774

Bolivar Roads is a natural navigable strait fringed by Bolivar Peninsula and Galveston Island emerging as a landform on the Texas Gulf Coast. The natural waterway inlet has a depth of 45 feet (14 m) with an island to peninsula shoreline width of 1.5 miles (2.4 km).

The ship canal approach is defined by two jetties extending into the Gulf of Mexico with distances of 4.5 miles (7.2 km) from the Bolivar Peninsula and 2.25 miles (3.62 km) from Galveston Island. The jetty harbor entrance originated in the 1890s as a preventative structure to inhibit the coastal sediment transport progressions by means of deviations with the continental margin and the Gulf Stream ocean current.

The Bolivar Roads channel tailors a nautical navigation gateway for Galveston Bay, Houston Ship Channel, Port of Galveston, and West Bay.

== Gallery ==
Depictions of Bolivar Roads at Bolivar Peninsula and Galveston Island
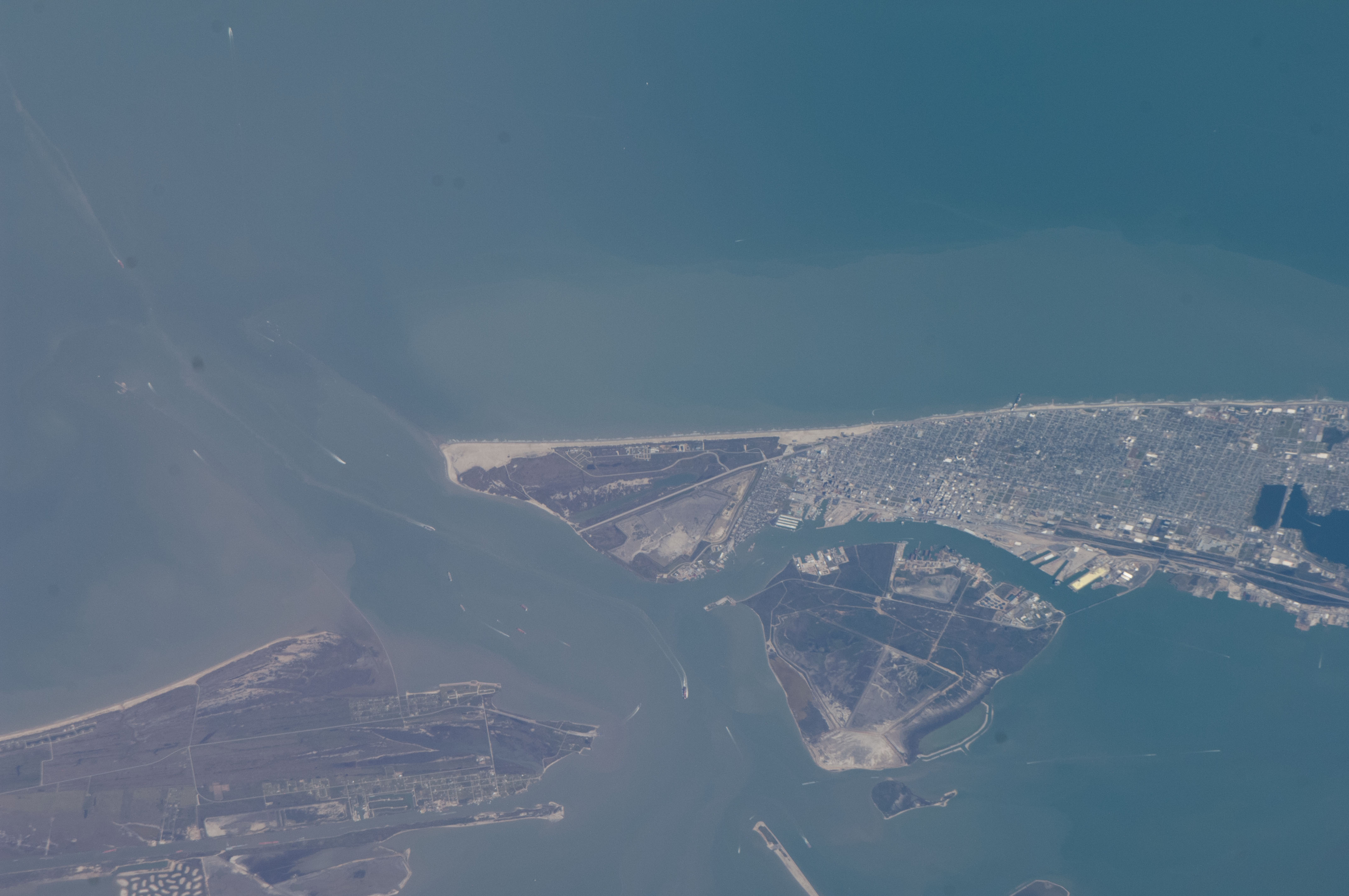
Southern aerial view of Bolivar Roads

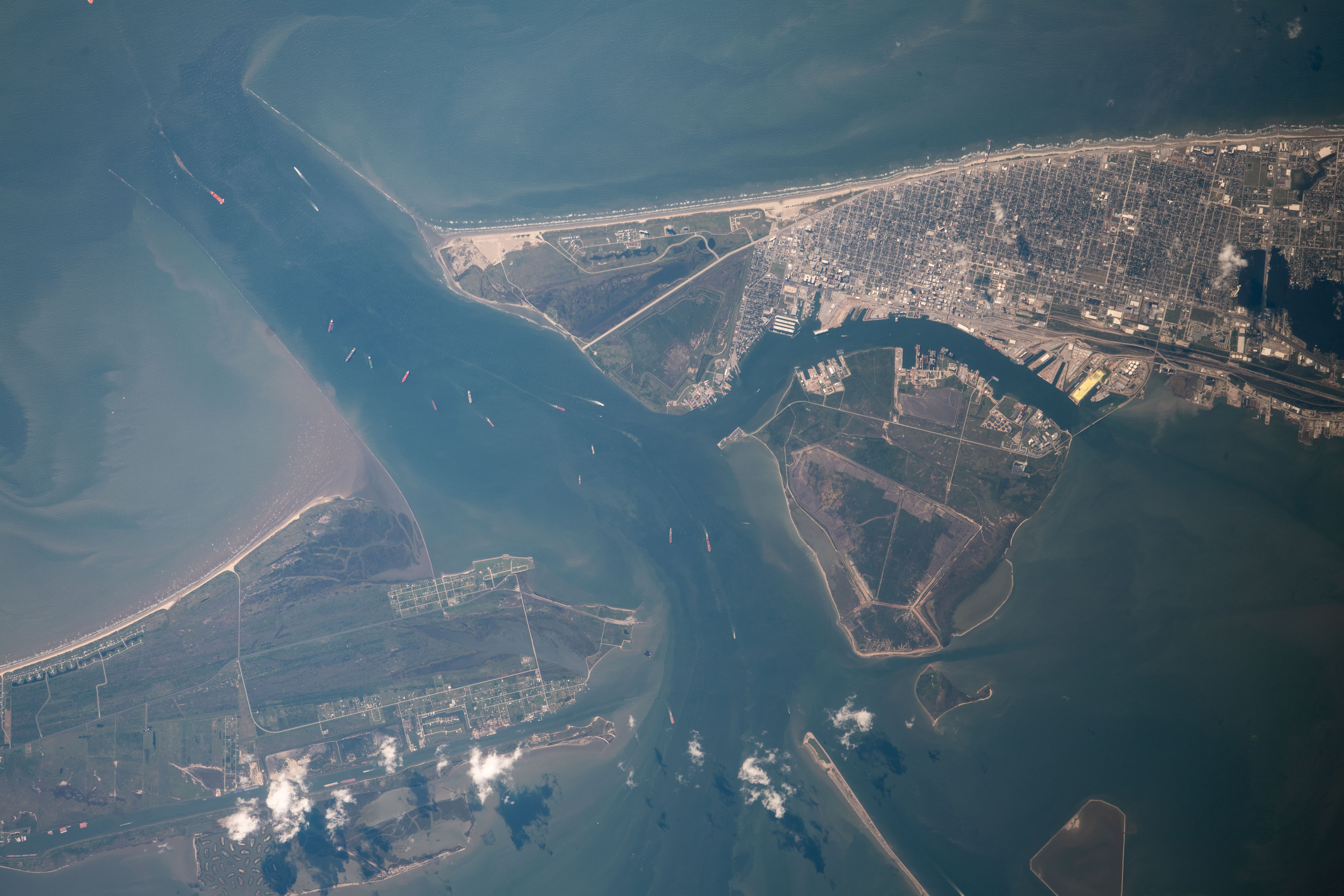
Bolivar Roads partition of Bolivar Peninsula and Galveston Island

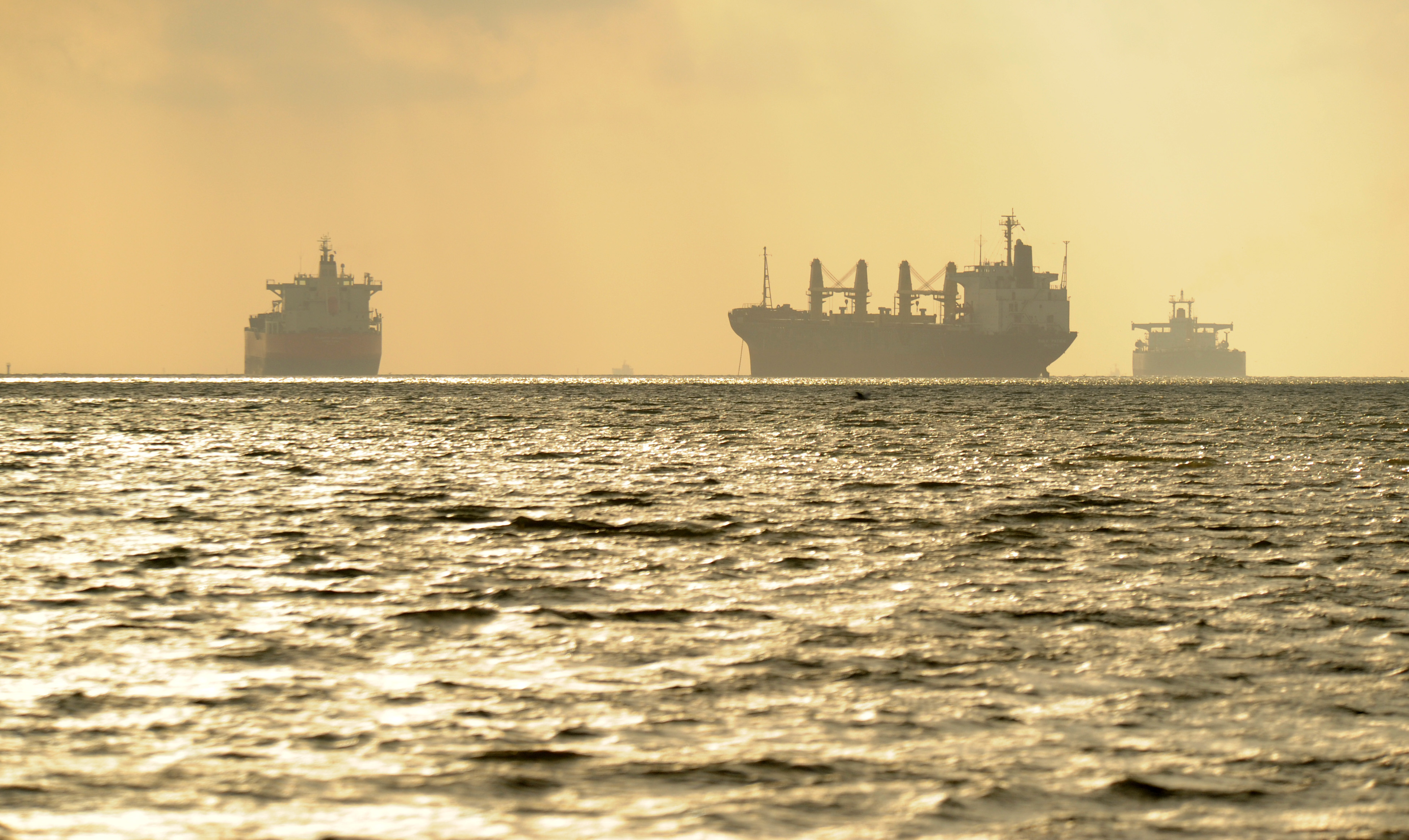
Maritime vessels at Galveston Island seacoast

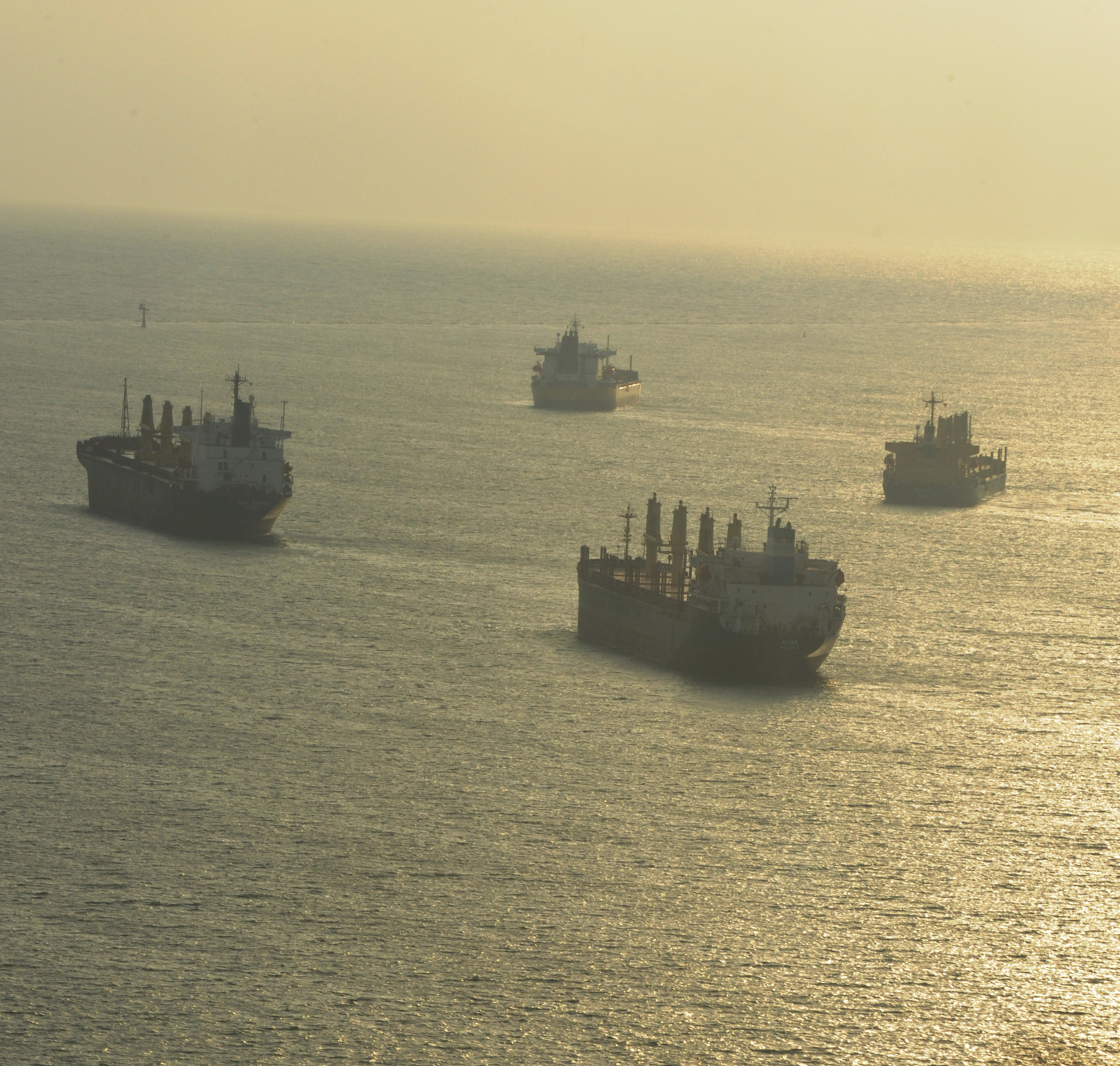
Maritime navigation to Bolivar Roads

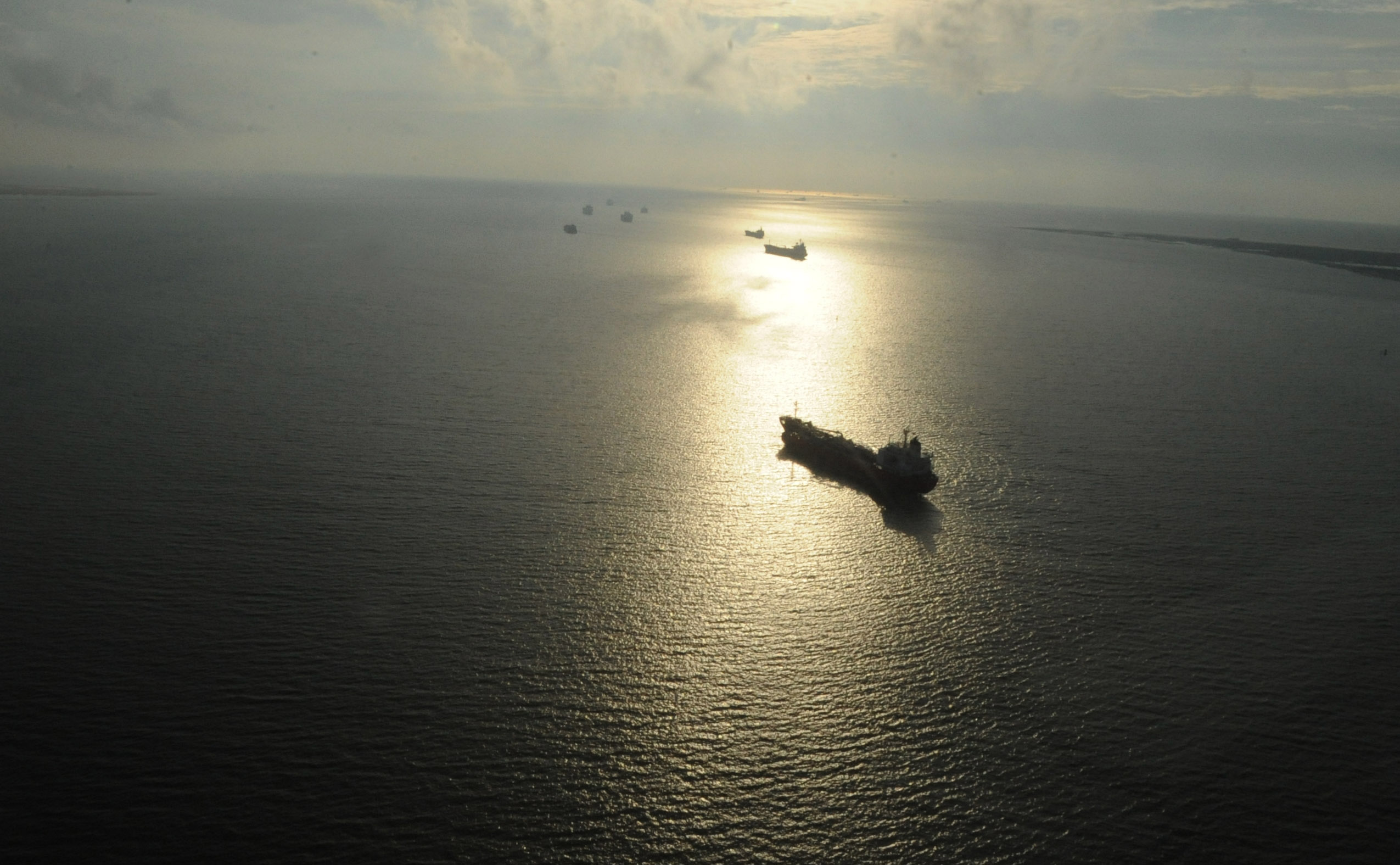
Ships approaching Bolivar Roads and Galveston Bay

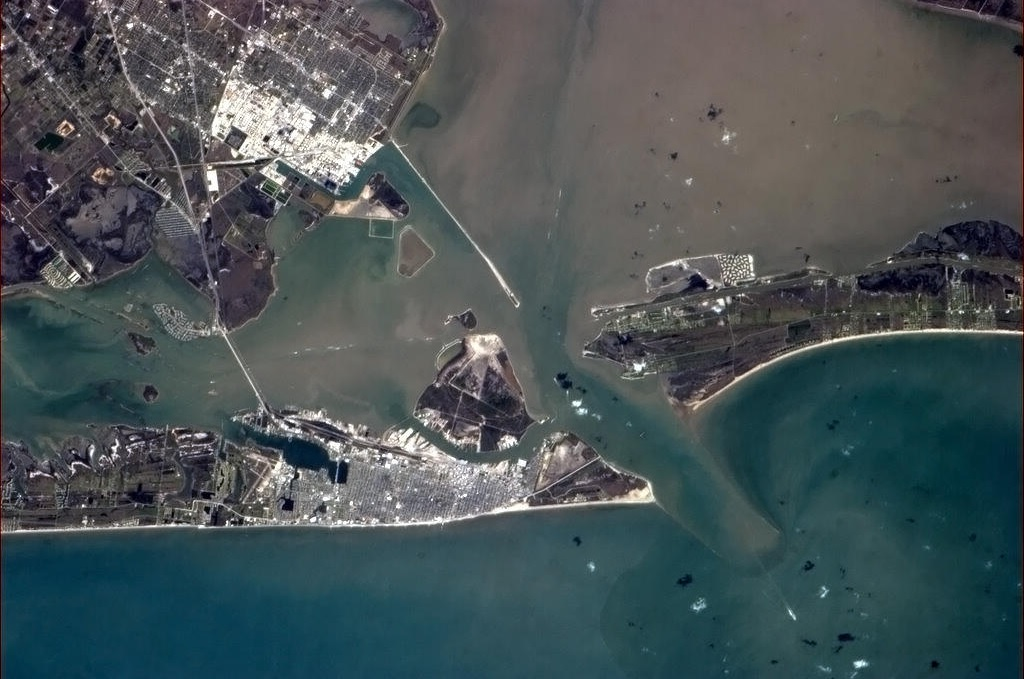
Geographic view of Bolivar Roads

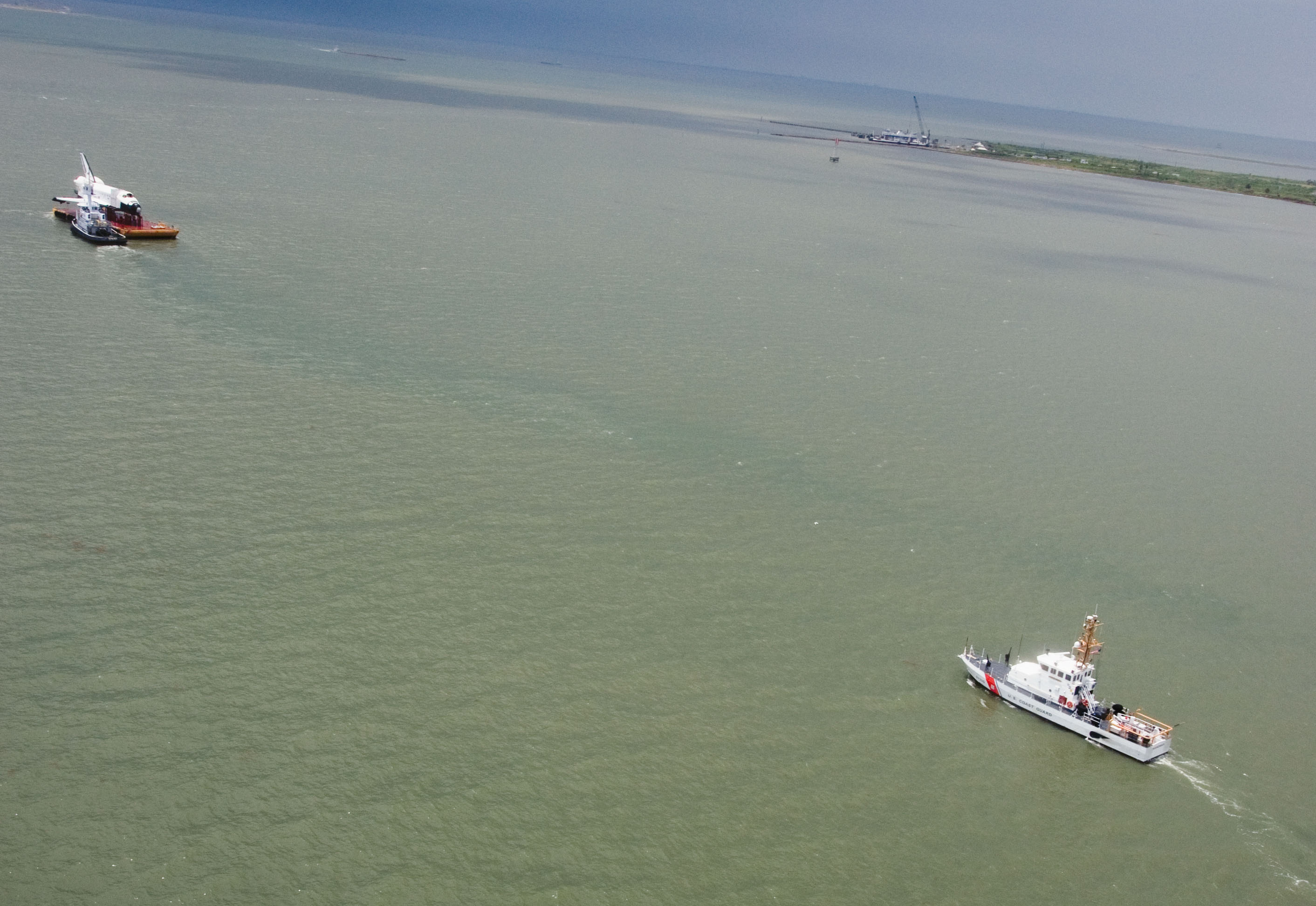
Space Shuttle Explorer navigating into Galveston Bay

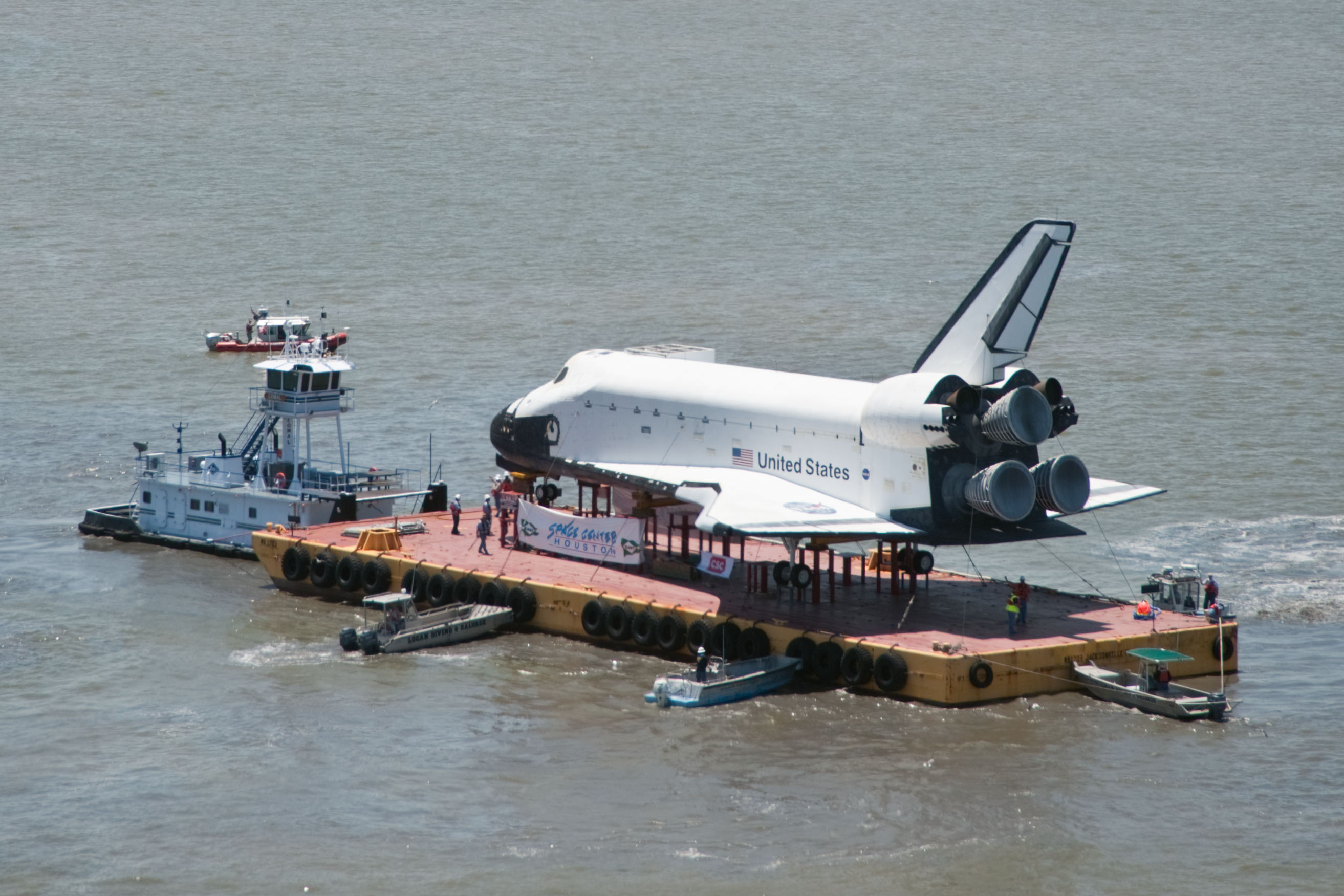
Space shuttle Explorer in Clear Lake City via barge transport

== See also ==
- Aframax
- Bolivar Bridge
- Cargo Ship Capacity
- List of Panamax ports
- Panamax
- United States Maritime Environmental Law
  - Refuse Act of 1899
  - MARPOL 73/78
  - Oil Pollution Act of 1924
  - Act to Prevent Pollution from Ships of 1980
  - Oil Pollution Act of 1961
  - Oil Pollution Act of 1990
  - Oil Pollution Act of 1973
  - Regulation of ship pollution in United States
