= Oil Pollution Act of 1973 =

- Long title: An Act to amend the Oil Pollution Act, 1961 (75 Stat. 402), as amended, to implement the 1969 and 1971 amendments to the International Convention for the Prevention of Pollution of the Sea by Oil, 1954, as amended; and for other purposes.
- Nicknames: Oil Pollution Act Amendments of 1973
- Enacted by: the 93rd United States Congress
- Effective: October 4, 1973

Citations
- Public law: 93-119
- Statutes at Large: 87 Stat. 424-2

Codification
- Acts amended: Oil Pollution Act of 1961
- Titles amended: 33 U.S.C.: Navigable Waters
- U.S.C. sections amended: 33 U.S.C. ch. 20 §§ 1001-1016

Legislative history
- Introduced in the House as H.R. 5451 by Leonor Sullivan (D-MO) on March 8, 1973; Committee consideration by House Merchant Marine and Fisheries, Senate Commerce; Passed the House on May 8, 1973 (370-1); Passed the Senate on September 24, 1973 (passed); Signed into law by President Richard Nixon on October 4, 1973

The Oil Pollution Act of 1973 or Oil Pollution Act Amendments of 1973, 33 U.S.C. Chapter 20 §§ 1001-1011, was a United States federal law which amended the United States Statute 75 Stat. 402. The Act of Congress sustained the United States commitment to control the discharge of fossil fuel pollutants from nautical vessels and to acknowledge the embargo of coastal zones in trans-boundary waters.

The H.R. 5451 legislation was passed by the United States 93rd Congressional session and enacted by the 37th President of the United States Richard Nixon on October 4, 1973.

== History of OILPOL ==
The International Convention for the Prevention of Pollution of the Sea by Oil (OILPOL) was an international convention organized by the United Kingdom in 1954. The convention was held in London, England from April 26, 1954 to May 12, 1954. The international meeting was convened to recognize the disposal of hazardous waste which could potentially yield toxic contamination to the marine ecosystems.

The International Convention for the Prevention of the Pollution of the Sea by Oil, 1954 original text was authored in English and French. The environmental protocol was amended in 1962, 1969, and 1971.

The 1971 OILPOL amendments imposed irrevocable oceanic jurisdictions for the Great Barrier Reef located in the Coral Sea. The international convention amendments introduced design control provisions for sea-going vessels which specified tank formation arrangement and tank size limitations for nautical transport ships.

== Provisions of the Act ==
The 1973 amendments accentuated the International Convention for the Prevention of Pollution of the Sea by Oil, 1954 by complying with the 1969 and 1971 international convention agreement amendments.

=== Definitions ===
Oily mixture means a mixture with any oil content.
Discharge in relation to instantaneous rate of discharge of oil content means the rate of discharge of oil in liters per hour at any instant divided by the speed of the ship in knots at the same instant.

Discharge of oil or oily mixture from a ship is prohibited unless

I.) ship is proceeding en route
II.) the instantaneous rate of discharge of oil content does not exceed 60 litres (13 imp gal; 16 US gal) per 1 mile (1.6 km)

Discharge of oil or oily mixture from a ship, other than tankers is prohibited unless

I.) oil content of the discharge is less than one hundred parts per one million parts of the mixture
II.) oil content of the discharge is made as far as practicable from the nearest land

Discharge of oil or oily mixture from tankers is prohibited unless

I.) Discharges from machinery space bilges shall be governed by the above provisions for ships other than tankers
II.) Total quantity of oil discharge on a ballast voyage does not exceed 1/15000 of the total cargo carrying capacity
III.) Tanker is more than 50 miles (80 km) from the nearest land

Nearest land means more than 50 miles (80 km) from a coastline
Secretary means the Secretary of the department which governs the operations of the United States Coast Guard

=== Tank Ship Construction Standards ===
Tankers built in the United States shall be constructed in accordance with the provisions of annex C of the International Convention for the Prevention of the Pollution of the Sea by Oil, as amended in 1971, relating to tank arrangement and limitation of tank size.

The construction standard has an effective date for all tankers built in the United States as of;

I.) Delivery of the tanker is after January 1, 1977
II.) Delivery of the tanker is not later than January 1, 1977, and the building contract is placed after January 1, 1972
III.) In cases where no building contract has previously been placed, the keel is laid or the tanker is at a similar stage of construction, after June 30, 1972

United States tankers are required to have on board a certificate of compliance attesting to the construction of the nautical vessel in accordance with annex C to the convention as specified by tank arrangement and limitation of tank size.

=== Zone Prohibitions ===
Australian Zone - northeastern coast of Australia or Queensland designated by a line drawn from a point on the coast of Australia in latitude 11 degrees south, longitude 142 degrees 08 minutes east (11°00′00″S 142°08′00″E) to a point in latitude 10 degrees 35 minutes south, longitude 141 degrees 55 minutes east (10°35′00″S 141°55′00″E).

Great Barrier Reef - Coral reef protection zone of the Earth's largest coral reef system.
thence to a point latitude 10 degrees 00 minutes south, longitude 142 degrees 00 minutes east (10°00′00″S 142°00′00″E)
thence to a point latitude 9 degrees 10 minutes south, longitude 143 degrees 52 minutes east (9°10′00″S 143°52′00″E)
thence to a point latitude 9 degrees 00 minutes south, longitude 144 degrees 30 minutes east (9°00′00″S 144°30′00″E)
thence to a point latitude 13 degrees 00 minutes south, longitude 144 degrees 00 minutes east (13°00′00″S 144°00′00″E)
thence to a point latitude 15 degrees 00 minutes south, longitude 146 degrees 00 minutes east (15°00′00″S 146°00′00″E)
thence to a point latitude 18 degrees 00 minutes south, longitude 147 degrees 00 minutes east (18°00′00″S 147°00′00″E)
thence to a point latitude 21 degrees 00 minutes south, longitude 153 degrees 00 minutes east (21°00′00″S 153°00′00″E)
thence to a point on the coast of Australia in latitude 24 degrees 42 minutes south, longitude 153 degrees 15 minutes east (24°42′00″S 153°15′00″E)

=== Oil Record Book ===
The oil record book is to be completed on each occasion, on a tank-to-tank basis, whenever any of the following operations take place on a ship and tanker.

Oil Record Book for Tankers
Name of ship
Total cargo carrying capacity of ship in cubic metres
I.) Loading of oil cargo
Date and place of loading
Types of oil loaded
Identity of tank(s) loaded
II.) Transfer of oil cargo during voyage
Date of transfer
Identity of tank(s)
(a) From transfer tank(s)
(b) To transfer tank(s)
Was (were) tank(s) in (a) From transfer tank(s) emptied?
III.) Discharge of oil cargo
Date and place of discharge
Identity of tank(s) discharged
Was (were) tank(s) emptied?
IV.) Ballasting of cargo tanks
Identity of tank(s) ballasted
Date and position of ship at start of ballasting
V.) Cleaning of cargo tanks
Identity of tank(s) cleaned
Date and duration of cleaning
Methods of cleaning*
Hand hosing, machine washing, or chemical cleaning. Where chemically cleaned, the amount and chemical used are to be specified in the oil record book.
VI.) Discharge of dirty ballast
Identity of tank(s)
Date and position of ship at start of discharge to sea
Date and position of ship at finish of discharge to sea
Ship's speed(s) during discharge
Quantity discharged to sea
Quantity of polluted water transferred to slop tank(s) (identify slop tank(s))
Date and port of discharge into shore reception facilities (if applicable)
VII.) Discharge of water from slop tank(s)
Identity of slop tank(s)
Time of settling from last entry of residues, or
Time of settling from last discharge
Date, time and position of ship at start of discharge
Sounding of total contents at start of discharge
Sounding of interface at start of discharge
Bulk quantity discharged and rate of discharge
Final quantity discharged and rate of discharge
Date, time and position of ship at end of discharge
Ship's speed(s) during discharge
Sounding of interface at end of discharge
VIII.) Disposal of residues
Identity of tank(s)
Quantity disposed from each tank
Method of disposal of residue:
(a) Reception facilities
(b) Mixed with cargo
(c) Transferred to another (other) tank(s) (identify tank(s))
(d) Other method
Date and port of disposal of residue
IX.) Discharge overboard of bilge water containing oil which accumulated in machinery spaces (including pump rooms)
Port
Duration of stay
Quantity disposed
Date and place of disposal
Method of disposal (state whether a separator was used)

Oil Record Book for Ships Other Than Tankers
Name of ship
I.) Ballasting or cleaning of bunker fuel tanks
Identity of tank(s) ballasted
Whether cleaned since they last contained oil and, if not, type of oil previously carried
Date and position of ship at start of cleaning
Date and position of ship at start of ballasting
II.) Discharge of dirty ballast or cleaning water from tanks
Identity of tank(s)
Date and position of ship at start of discharge
Date and position of ship at finish of discharge
Ship's speed(s) during discharge
Method of discharge (state whether separator used)
Quantity discharged
III.) Disposal of residues
Quantity of residue retained on board
Methods of disposal of residue:
(a) Reception facilities
(b) Mixed with next bunkering
(c) Transferred to another (other) tank(s)
Date and port of disposal of residue
IV.) Discharge overboard of bilge water containing oil which accumulated in machinery spaces
Port
Duration of stay
Quantity disposed
Date and place of disposal
Method of disposal (state whether separator used)

== Repeal of Oil Pollution Act of 1973 ==
The 1973 United States public law was repealed by the enactment of Act to Prevent Pollution from Ships on October 21, 1980.

== See also ==
Ballast tank
Ballast water discharge and the environment
Environmental impact of shipping
International Maritime Organization
Marine Protection, Research, and Sanctuaries Act of 1972
MARPOL 73/78
Oil Pollution Act of 1924
Oil Pollution Act of 1990
United States energy law
