= Oil Pollution Act of 1961 =

- Long title: An Act to implement the provisions of the International Convention for the Prevention of the Pollution of the Sea by Oil, 1954.
- Nicknames: Oil Pollution Act, 1961
- Enacted by: the 87th United States Congress
- Effective: August 30, 1961

Citations
- Public law: 87-167
- Statutes at Large: 75 Stat. 402

Codification
- Titles amended: 33 U.S.C.: Navigable Waters
- U.S.C. sections created: 33 U.S.C. ch. 20 §§ 1001-1016

Legislative history
- Introduced in the Senate as S. 2187; Passed the Senate on May 16, 1961 (92-0); Signed into law by President John F. Kennedy on August 30, 1961

Oil Pollution Act of 1961, 33 U.S.C. Chapter 20 §§ 1001–1011, established judicial definitions and coastal prohibitions for the United States maritime industry. The Act invoked the accords of the International Convention for the Prevention of the Pollution of the Sea by Oil, 1954. The international agreement provided provisions to control the discharge of fossil fuel pollutants from nautical vessels on the high seas.

The S. 2187 legislation was passed by the United States 87th Congressional session and enacted by the 35th President of the United States John F. Kennedy on August 30, 1961.

== History ==
The International Convention for the Prevention of Pollution of the Sea by Oil (OILPOL) was an international convention organized by the United Kingdom in 1954. The convention was held in London, England from April 26, 1954, to May 12, 1954. The international meeting was convened to acknowledge the disposal of harmful waste which posed endangerment to the marine ecosystems.

The International Convention for the Prevention of the Pollution of the Sea by Oil, 1954 original text was penned in English and French. The 1954 international agreement was amended in 1962, 1969, and 1971.

== Provisions of the Act ==
The Act emulated the subsequent formalities of the International Convention for the Prevention of the Pollution of the Sea by Oil, 1954.

=== Definitions ===
Discharge in relation to oil or to an oily mixture means any discharge or escape howsoever caused
Heavy diesel oil means marine diesel oil, other than those distillates of which more than fifty percent by volume distils at a temperature not exceeding 340 °C / 644 °F when tested by American Society for Testing and Materials standard method D158-53
Mile means a nautical mile of 6,080 feet (1,850 m)
Oil means persistent oils, such as crude oil, fuel oil, heavy diesel oil, and lubricating oil. The oil in an oil mixture is less than one hundred parts per one million parts of the oil mixture, and is not deemed to foul the surface of the sea
Prohibited zones means four designated zones described as Adriatic zones, North Sea zones, Atlantic zones, and Australian zone
Ship means

(I) ships for the time being used as naval auxiliaries;
(II) ships of under five hundred tons gross tonnage;
(III) ships for the time being engaged in the whaling industry;
(IV) ships for the time being navigating the Great Lakes of North America and their connecting and tributary waters as far east as the lower exit of the Lachine Canal Montreal in the Province of Quebec, Canada.

Secretary means the Secretary of the United States Army

=== Zone Prohibitions ===
Adriatic Zones - Within the Adriatic Sea the prohibited zones off the coasts of Italy and Yugoslavia respectively shall each extend for a distance of 50 miles (80 km) from land, excepting only the island of Vis.
North Sea Zones - The North Sea zone shall extend for a distance of 100 miles (160 km) from the coasts of the following countries:

Belgium
Denmark
Federal Republic of Germany
Netherlands
United Kingdom of Great Britain and Northern Ireland

but not beyond the point where the limit of a 100 miles (160 km) zone off the west coast of Jutland intersects the limit of the 50 miles (80 km) zone off the coast of Norway.
Atlantic Zones - Atlantic zone shall be within a line drawn from a point on the Greenwich meridian 100 miles (160 km) in a north-north-easterly direction from the Shetland Islands; thence northwards along the Greenwich meridian to latitude 64° north; thence westwards along the 64th parallel to longitude 10° west (64°00′00″N 10°00′00″W); thence to latitude 60° north, longitude 14° west (60°00′00″N 14°00′00″W); thence to latitude 54° 30' north, longitude 30° west (54°30′00″N 30°00′00″W); thence to latitude 44° 20' north, longitude 30° west (44°20′00″N 30°00′00″W); thence to latitude 48° north, longitude 14° west (48°00′00″N 14°00′00″W); thence eastwards along the 48th parallel to a point of intersection with the 50 miles (80 km) zone off the coast of France.
Australian Zone - Australian Zone shall extend for a distance of 150 miles (240 km) from the coasts of Australia, except off the north and west coasts of the Australian mainland between the point opposite Thursday Island and the point on the west coast at 20° south latitude (20°00′00″S 119°40′00″E).

=== Oil Record Book ===
There shall be carried in every ship an oil record book. In the event of such discharge or escape of oil from a ship in a prohibited zone, a signed statement shall be made in the oil record book, by the officer or officers in charge of the operations concerned and by the master of the ship, of the circumstances of and reason for the discharge or escape.

Oil Record Book for Tankers
Date of Entry
I.) Ballasting of and discharge of ballast from cargo tanks
Identity numbers of tank(s)
Type of oil previously contained in tank(s)
Date and place of ballasting
Date and time of discharge of ballast water
Place or position of ship
Approximate amount of oil-contaminated water transferred to slop tank(s)
Identity numbers of slop tank(s)
II.) Cleaning of cargo tanks
Identity numbers of tank(s) cleaned
Type of oil previously contained in tank(s)
Identity numbers of slop tank(s) to which washings transferred
Dates and times of cleaning
III.) Settling in slop tank(s) and discharge of water
Identity numbers of slop tank(s)
Period of settling (in hours)
Date and time of discharge of water
Place or position of ship
Approximate quantities of residue
IV.) Disposal from ship of oil residues from slop tank(s) and other sources
Date and method of disposal
Place or position of ship
Sources and approximate quantities

Oil Record Book for Ships Other Than Tankers
Date of Entry
I.) Ballasting, or cleaning during voyage, of bunker fuel tanks
Identity numbers of tank(s)
Type of oil previously contained in tank(s)
Date and place of ballasting
Date and time of discharge of ballast or washing water
Place or position of ship
Whether separator used: if so, give period of use
Disposal of oily residue retained on board
II.) Disposal from ship of oil residues from bunker fuel tanks and other sources
Date and method of disposal
Place or position of ship
Sources and approximate quantities

Oil Record Book for All Ships
Date of Entry
Accidental and other exceptional discharges or escapes of oil
Date and time of occurrence
Place or position of ship
Approximate quantity and type of oil
Circumstances of discharge or escape and general remarks

== Repeal of Oil Pollution Act of 1961 ==
The 1961 United States statute was repealed by the enactment of Act to Prevent Pollution from Ships on October 21, 1980.

== See also ==
Ballast tank
Ballast water discharge and the environment
Environmental impact of shipping
International Maritime Organization
MARPOL 73/78
Oil discharge monitoring equipment
Oil Pollution Act of 1924
Oil Pollution Act of 1973
Oil Pollution Act of 1990
