= Oil Pollution Act of 1924 =

- Long title: An Act to protect navigation from obstruction and injury by preventing the discharge of oil into the coastal navigable waters of the United States.
- Nicknames: Oil Pollution Act, 1924
- Enacted by: the 68th United States Congress
- Effective: June 7, 1924

Citations
- Public law: Pub. L. 68–238
- Statutes at Large: 43 Stat. 604

Codification
- Titles amended: 33 U.S.C.: Navigable Waters
- U.S.C. sections created: 33 U.S.C. ch. 9, subch. II § 431 et seq.

Legislative history
- Introduced in the Senate as S. 1942; Passed the Senate on June 16, 1924 (Passed); Passed the House on June 5, 1924 (Passed) with amendment; Senate agreed to House amendment on June 5, 1924 (Agreed); Signed into law by President Calvin Coolidge on June 7, 1924

Oil Pollution Act of 1924 is a United States federal statute establishing regulations for coastal navigable waters with regards to intentional fossil fuel discharges from seagoing vessels. The Act of Congress grants the Secretary of War authority to evaluate the oil volume discharge from a vessel while assessing if coastal navigable waters have a potential toxicity posing a deleterious condition for human health and seafood contamination. The 1924 United States statute provides judicial penalties encompassing civil and criminal punishment for violations of the prescribed regulations as stated in the Act.

The legislation was passed by the 68th United States Congressional session and confirmed as a federal law by the 30th President of the United States Calvin Coolidge on June 7, 1924.

== Provisions of the Act ==
The 1924 environmental law provided seven codified sections defining territorial jurisdiction for the United States inland navigable waters.

33 U.S.C. § 431 ~ Title of Act
33 U.S.C. § 432 ~ Meaning of terms
33 U.S.C. § 433 ~ Unlawful discharge of oil in navigable waters
33 U.S.C. § 434 ~ Punishment for violation of oil discharge and liability of vessel
33 U.S.C. § 435 ~ Revocation of officers licenses for violations
33 U.S.C. § 436 ~ Administration by harbor and river officers for arrest of offenders and enforcement
33 U.S.C. § 437 ~ Act is an addition and not a repeal of existing navigable water laws

== Amendment and Repeal of 1924 Act ==
The Clean Water Restoration Act of 1966 amended the 1924 public law requiring vessel ownerships to recover oil discharges in relationship to the adjoining shorelines and navigable waters of the United States. The 1966 amendment designated the authority of the Act to the U.S. Department of the Interior with a provision allowing enforcement activities by the United States Armed Forces. The federal statute was passed by the United States 89th Congressional session and enacted into law by the 36th President of the United States Lyndon Johnson on November 3, 1966.

The Oil Pollution Act of 1924 was repealed by the United States 91st Congressional session enactment of the Federal Water Pollution Control Act Amendments of 1970. The United States statute was confirmed as a federal law by the 37th President of the United States Richard Nixon on April 3, 1970.

== See also ==
- Inland waterways of the United States
- Intracoastal Waterway
- Oil discharge monitoring equipment
- Oil Pollution Act of 1961
- Oil Pollution Act of 1973
- Oil Pollution Act of 1990
- Refuse Act of 1899
- Rivers and Harbors Act
