= Rivers and Harbors Act under the Obama administration =

That it shall not be lawful to throw, discharge, or deposit, or cause, suffer, or procure to be thrown, discharged, or deposited either from or out of any ship, barge, or other floating craft of any kind, or from shore, wharf, manufacturing establishment, or mill of any kind, any refuse matter of any kind or description whatever other than that flowing from streets and sewers and passing therefrom in a liquid state, into any navigable water of the United States…

— Fifty-Fifth Congress (1899)

== Introduction to Rivers and Harbors Act ==
The Rivers and Harbors Act was passed in 1899 by the Fifty Fifth Congress of the United States of America. The original goal of the bill was to give the U.S. government more legal control over U.S. lakes, rivers, and waterways entering the U.S. by creating quality control standards and regulations to help maintain these standards. In addition to pollution control, the act identified U.S. waterways as a vital resource and requires a permit for any obstruction to navigable water. The Rivers and Harbors Act also identified commonly used U.S. waterways, allowing congress to distribute funds for improvements. The amount designated to each of the identified waterway was based on how economically stimulating the waterway was.

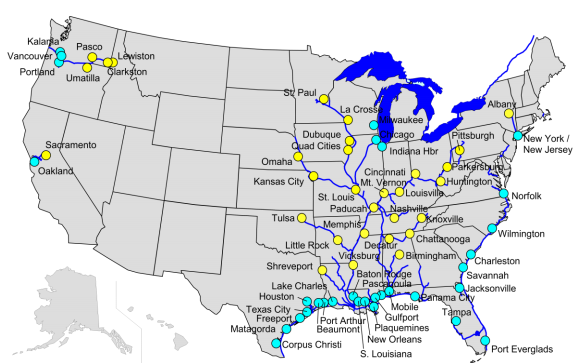
Inland Navigable U.S. Waterways

The Rivers and Harbors Act is regulated under the U.S. Army Corps of Engineers and the U.S. Coast Guard. The U.S. Army Corps of Engineers is responsible for maintaining the standards set by the Rivers and Harbors Act, while the U.S. Coast Guard is primarily responsible for the permits needed to build in U.S. navigable waters.

As a result of the bill being passed in 1899, the Rivers and Harbors Act became the first environmental law in the U.S. that directly regulated pollution of waterways and served as a precursor to the revision of the Clean Water Act.

== Renewal of permits under the Obama administration ==
On January 6, 2017, the Army U.S. Army Corps of Engineers reissued 50 existing nationwide permits (NWPs) and 2 new NWPs. NWPs are permits required under the Rivers and Harbors Act of 1988 for construction of projects interacting or crossing U.S. waterways. Under the Clean Water Act and the Rivers and Harbors Act, NWPs require that the project has a minimal individual and cumulative impact on the current environment during the timeframe of the issued NWP. Meaning developers must take care that any disruption to the surrounding environment is necessary for the project to be completed. The permits issued under the NWPs are set to expire on March 18, 2022, 5 years from their official issue date (March 19, 2017).

Part of the 50 reissued permits also include construction of natural gas, oil, and other fossil fuel pipelines. This includes the construction of the Dakota Access Pipeline, which has caused major controversies over its possible effects on the surrounding environment. Because of this controversy, the Obama administration did not grant a real estate easement to the developers. This action by the Obama administration did not stop the construction because the jurisdiction still falls under the Rivers and Harbors Act, which is overseen by the U.S. Army Corps of Engineers.
