= 1972 in the environment =

This is a list of notable events relating to the environment in 1972. They relate to environmental law, conservation, environmentalism and environmental issues.

== Events ==
- The Limits to Growth is published. The book is about the computer modelling of unchecked economic and population growth with finite resource supplies, and became both controversial and influential.
- The existence of the North Atlantic Garbage Patch is documented.
- Mining of St. Pierre Island ceased, which had converted an island once densely forested into a barren, pitted landscape.
- The World Conference on Breeding Endangered Species in Captivity as an Aid to their Survival is held. It is the world's first conference on captive breeding.
- Three dams are built to impound Lake Pedder in Tasmania, a controversial issue in both Tasmania and Australia as a whole. It caused the extinction of at least three species.

=== January ===
- A Blueprint for Survival, an influential environmentalist text that drew attention to the urgency and magnitude of environmental problems, was published as a special edition of The Ecologist. It was later published in book form and went on to sell over 750,000 copies.

=== March ===
- The United Tasmania Group, the first ever green party, is formed in Australia.

=== April ===
- The Clean Air Act 1972 comes into force in New Zealand.

=== May ===
- The Values Party, considered the world's first national-level green party, was established in New Zealand.

=== June ===
- The United Nations Conference on the Human Environment (also known as the Stockholm Conference), an international conference convened under United Nations auspices, was held in Stockholm, Sweden.
  - The Declaration of the United Nations Conference on the Human Environment (Stockholm Declaration) was adopted by the United Nations.
  - The United Nations Environment Programme is established
- The Federal Insecticide, Fungicide, and Rodenticide Act becomes law in the United States. It is a federal law that sets up the basic U.S. system of pesticide regulation to protect applicators, consumers, and the environment.

=== August ===
- The Oswego-Guardian/Texanita collision occurred between two supertankers near Stilbaai, South Africa. The accident was a catalyst for change to marine traffic separation procedures as well as oil tanker inerting.

=== September ===
- The Wildlife Protection Act of 1972 is enacted in India.

=== October ===
- The Clean Water Act, a.k.a. the Federal Water Pollution Control Amendments of 1972, are passed in the United States over US president Richard Nixon's veto.
- Nixon signed into law the Marine Protection, Research, and Sanctuaries Act of 1972, or Ocean Dumping Act.
- The Coastal Zone Management Act is passed in the United States to encourage coastal states to develop and implement coastal zone management plans.
- Nixon signed the Noise Control Act, to control and regulate noise pollution.

=== November ===
- The Convention Concerning the Protection of the World Cultural and Natural Heritage was adopted by the General Conference of UNESCO. It establishes the World Heritage Site programme.

=== December ===
- The Marine Mammal Protection Act of 1972 comes into effect in the United States. It was the first federal law to call specifically for an ecosystem approach to natural resource management and conservation.

== See also ==
- Human impact on the environment
- List of environmental issues
- List of years in the environment
