= Rivers and Harbors Act of 1899 =

United States federal law

- Enacted by: the 55th United States Congress
- Effective: March 03, 1899

Citations
- Public law: Pub. L. 55–425
- Statutes at Large: 30 Stat. 1121

Legislative history
- Introduced in the House; Signed into law by President William McKinley on

The Rivers and Harbors Appropriation Act of 1899 is the oldest federal environmental law in the United States. The Act makes it a misdemeanor to discharge refuse matter of any kind into the navigable waters, or tributaries thereof, of the United States without a permit; this specific provision is known as the Refuse Act. The Act also makes it a misdemeanor to excavate, fill, or alter the course, condition, or capacity of any port, harbor, channel, or other areas within the reach of the Act without a permit. The Act also made it illegal to dam navigable streams without a license (or permit) from Congress. This provision was included for the purposes of hydroelectric generation, at a time when the electric utility industry was expanding rapidly.

Although many activities covered by the Act are regulated under the Clean Water Act, the 1899 Act retains independent vitality. The Act is administered by the United States Army Corps of Engineers. However, authority to administer Section 9 of the Act, applying to bridges and causeways in, over or on navigable waters of the U.S. (superseded by the General Bridge Act of 1946, as amended), was removed from the Corps of Engineers and redelegated to the U.S. Coast Guard under the provisions of the Department of Transportation Act of 1966. The Corps owns and operates many bridges and may not regulate themselves due to conflict of interest.

The Jacksonville District of the Army Corps of Engineers has jurisdiction over the waters of the Caribbean Sea, the Gulf of Mexico and the Atlantic Ocean.

== See also ==
- Clean Water Act#Dredge and fill permits
- Flood Control Act
- Water pollution
- Water Resources Development Act
