= Refuse Act =

United States federal statute

- Other short titles: Rivers and Harbors Appropriation Act of 1899
- Long title: An Act making appropriations for the construction, repair, and preservation of certain public works on rivers and harbors, and for other purposes.
- Nicknames: Refuse Act of 1899
- Enacted by: the 55th United States Congress
- Effective: March 3, 1899

Citations
- Public law: Pub. L. 55–425
- Statutes at Large: 30 Stat. 1121 aka 30 Stat. 1152

Codification
- Titles amended: 33 U.S.C.: Navigable Waters
- U.S.C. sections created: 33 U.S.C. ch. 9, subch. I § 407

Legislative history
- Signed into law by President William McKinley on March 3, 1899

The Refuse Act is a United States federal statute governing use of waterways. The Act, a section of the Rivers and Harbors Act of 1899, prohibited "dumping of refuse" into navigable waters, except by permit.

== Implementation history ==
The Army Corps of Engineers administered the Act and initially focused on controlling debris that obstructed navigation.

=== Pollution control litigation in the 1960s ===
In the 1960s, due to increasing public and governmental concern about water pollution, the federal government began to use the Act to control pollution. The government pursued court cases to prosecute dischargers of industrial waste to waterways. Notable cases include United States v. Republic Steel Corp. (1960) and U.S. v. Standard Oil Co. (1966).

=== 1970 Discharge permit program ===
Congress had enacted the Federal Water Pollution Control Act (FWPCA) in 1948 to address water pollution problems, but this law gave the government limited enforcement authority. The Department of Interior, which administered the FWPCA (prior to 1972), developed a policy with the Department of Justice and the Army Corps of Engineers to use the Refuse Act as an enforcement tool, to complement the FWPCA. In 1970 President Richard Nixon issued an Executive Order creating a new permit program under the Refuse Act. The focus of the new permit program was on industrial pollution.

The Corps of Engineers began to issue the new discharge permits, but in 1971 a legal challenge halted the program.

== 1972 FWPCA Amendments ==
Congress enacted major amendments to the FWPCA in 1972. (See Clean Water Act.) Included in the legislation was a new discharge permit program, called the National Pollutant Discharge Elimination System (NPDES), which replaced the Refuse Act permit program. The amendments assigned lead responsibility for implementation of NPDES to the newly formed Environmental Protection Agency (EPA).

Congress did not repeal the Refuse Act. The law is still used by the Corps of Engineers to prevent obstructions to navigation. In some pollution enforcement cases, the federal government has used it as a supplemental authority along with the FWPCA.
