= Texas City Dike =

Dam in Texas, United States

Coordinates: 29°23′24.99″N 94°53′10.03″W

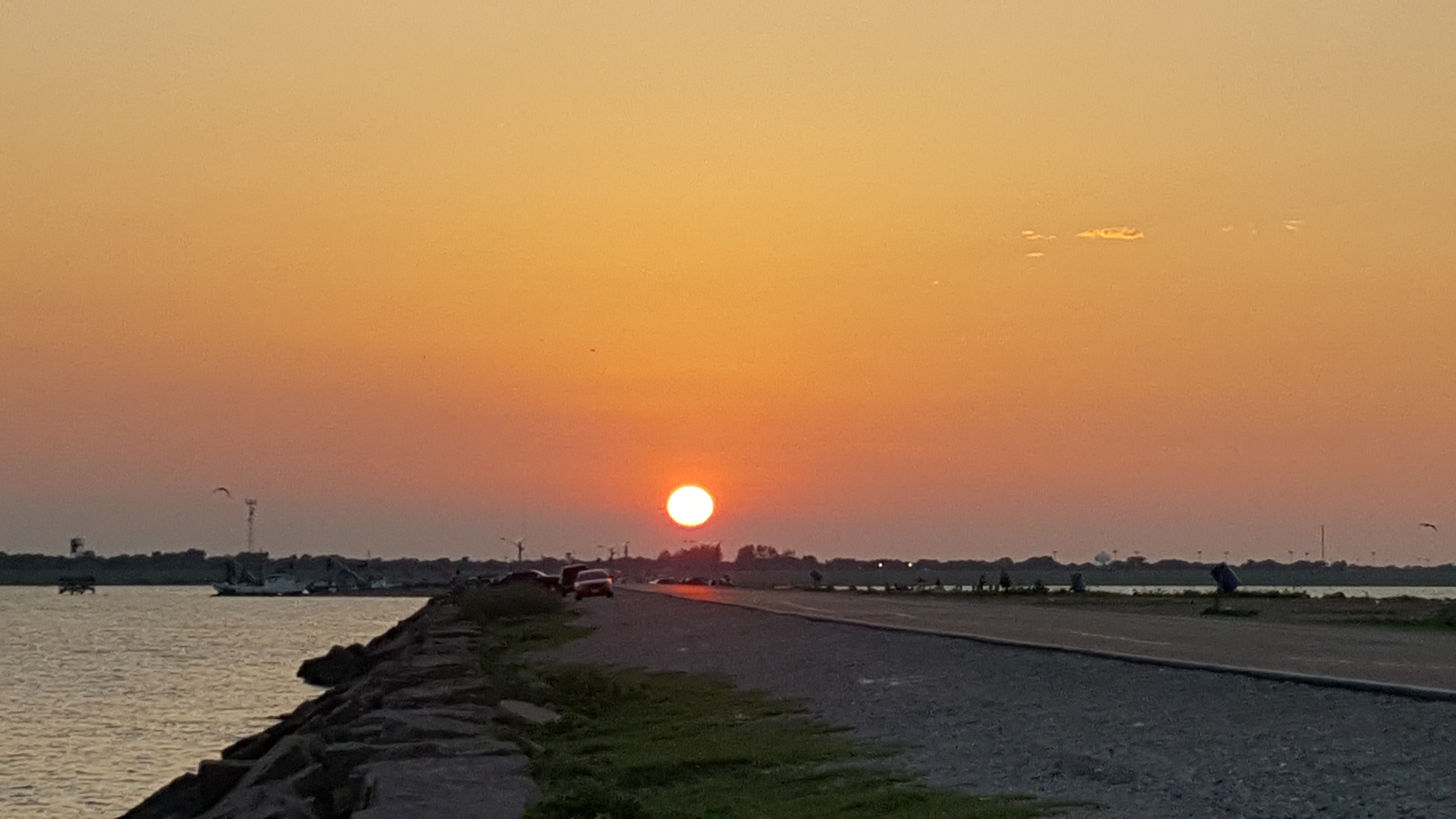
Sunset image taken from Texas City Dike

The Texas City Dike is a levee located in Texas City, Texas, United States that projects nearly 5 miles (8.0 km) south-east into the mouth of Galveston Bay. It is flanked by the north-eastern tip of Galveston Island and the south-western tip of the Bolivar Peninsula. The dike, one of the area's most beloved and enduring landmarks, was originally designed to reduce the impact of sediment accumulation along the lower Bay.

The Bay itself connects the Houston Ship Channel, one of the nation's most important commercial waterways, and the Port of Houston with the Gulf of Mexico 35 nautical miles (65 km) distant. However, as Texas City expanded from its industrial roots to become a thriving residential community, the dike's purpose changed, and it became the city's best hope against a catastrophic incursion of water surging westward into the low-lying community from a hurricane landfall in the Bay. It was hoped that the dike, Texas City's primary defense against potential encroachment of water from Galveston Bay and the Gulf of Mexico, would lessen or even entirely deflect substantial damage to the city from such a potentially cataclysmic event.

The Texas City Dike juts out into Galveston Bay on the easternmost end of Texas City. The dike is parallel to and north of the 50-foot deep, 600-foot wide Texas City Channel, which allows shipping traffic to access the Port of Texas City. The dike's structure consists of a 28,200-foot-long (approximately 5.34 miles) pile dike paired with a rubble-mound dike that runs along the south edge of the pile dike (U.S. Army Corps of Engineers, 2007). The Texas City Dike was built to protect the Texas City Channel from cross currents and excessive silting, although the channel must still be dredged frequently to prevent shoaling in the waterway.

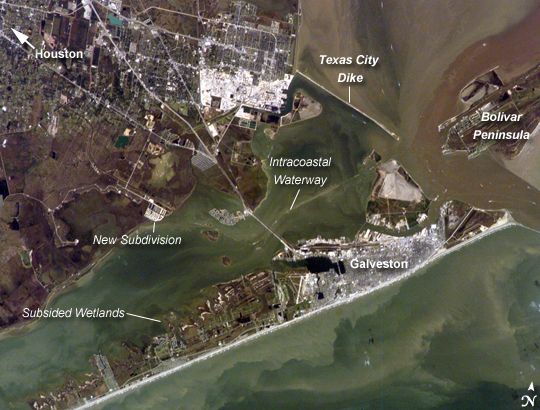
The Texas City Dike and Galveston Bay region as photographed from the International Space Station, Nov 2006. Image courtesy of the Earth Science and Remote Sensing Unit, NASA Johnson Space Center.

== Construction ==
The dike, whose construction was authorized by the Texas State Legislature in 1935, was constructed of tumbled granite blocks, ranging in size from that of a small suitcase to roughly that of a sub-compact car, with a wide paved road extending its entire length. Boasting numerous fishing piers, bait and tackle shops, and restaurants awash in local color, the dike is often referred to by locals as "the world's longest man-made fishing pier." Along its length, it offers magnificent views of the lower Bay, the constant stream of commercial shipping and private pleasure craft that ply its waves, and nearby coastlines and islands including the Bolivar Peninsula, Virginia Point, Pelican Island, and the East End of Galveston. It is also famous for the many brown pelicans that called it home year-round.

- Is roughly 5.3 miles long with an asphalt road 24 feet wide and 12 feet of shoulders on either side of improved crushed gravel.
- Has been advertised as the longest man-made pier.

== Legal status ==
In general, individual US states have sovereign control over their coastal seafloors, including those under man-made structures, but the Texas City Dike is an exception. An Act of the Texas Legislature in the mid-1930s ceded ownership of the dike along its length (and 500 feet on each side from the original centerline) to the Municipal government of Texas City.

== Hurricane Ike damage ==
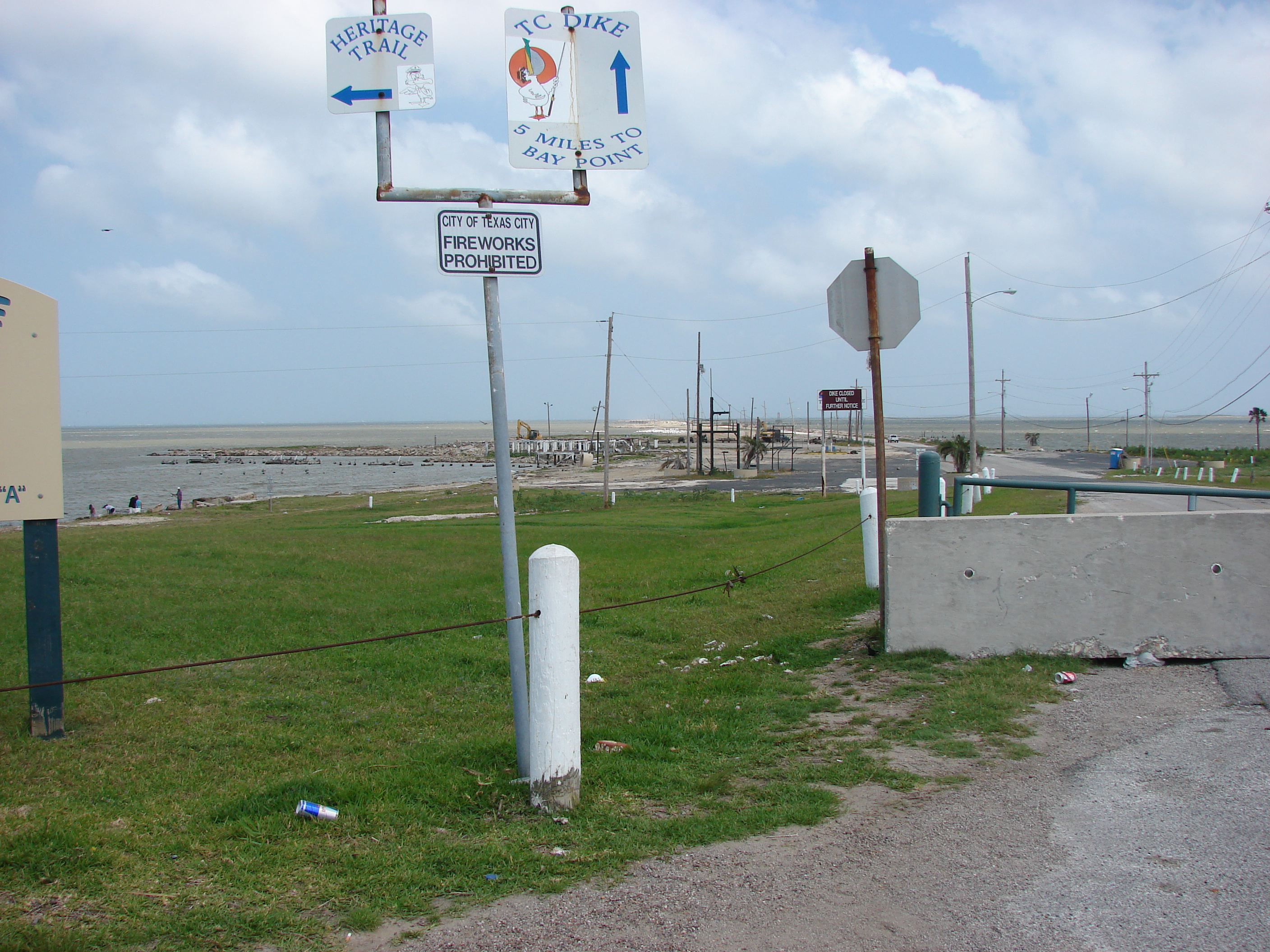
Entrance to Texas City Dike on April 26, 2009. The dike was closed for repairs for almost two years due to damage from Hurricane Ike.

The dike was over-topped (and structures destroyed) by what was measured as an 11-foot (3.4 m) storm surge driven into the Bay by Hurricane Ike. Significant waves were witnessed to batter the dike as early as the afternoon of Friday, September 12, 2008, fully twelve hours ahead of the tropical cyclone's arrival on nearby Galveston Island's East End. It is not known whether the destruction of the dike's structures occurred before, or following Ike's entrance into Galveston Bay proper at approximately 3:00 a.m. Central Daylight Time on Saturday, September 13, 2008. It was reopened on September 11, 2010, two days before the second anniversary of Hurricane Ike's destruction of the dike.

Residents of Texas City are given tags to enter the dike via automobile for free, while visitors outside the city must pay a $10 entry fee between 6 am and 9 pm during the summer months. Fines for littering the new dike cost $200, and vendors cannot sell on the dike.

== In pop culture ==
A song, "Texas City Dyke", by Gene Kelton, is a play on words.

== See also ==
- Galveston Seawall
