= Marine Protection, Research, and Sanctuaries Act of 1972 =

American environmental legislation

- Other short titles: Comprehensive Research on Ocean Dumping Act; National Marine Sanctuaries Act (NMSA) (16 U.S.C. 1431)
- Long title: An Act to regulate the transportation for dumping, and the dumping, of material into ocean waters, and for other purposes.
- Acronyms (colloquial): MPRSA, ODA
- Nicknames: Ocean Dumping Act
- Enacted by: the 92nd United States Congress
- Effective: October 23, 1972

Citations
- Public law: 92-532
- Statutes at Large: 86 Stat. 1052

Codification
- Titles amended: 16 U.S.C.: Conservation; 33 U.S.C.: Navigable Waters
- U.S.C. sections created: 16 U.S.C. ch. 32 §§ 1431 - 1445.; 16 U.S.C. ch. 32A §§ 1447 - 1447f.; 33 U.S.C. ch. 27 §§ 1401 - 1445.; 33 U.S.C. ch. 41 §§ 2801 - 2805.

Legislative history
- Introduced in the House as H.R. 9727; Signed into law by President Richard Nixon on October 23, 1972

Major amendments
- Pub. L. 100–627, 102 Stat. 3213, enacted November 7, 1988; Pub. L. 100–688, 102 Stat. 4139, enacted November 18, 1988

Marine Protection, Research and Sanctuaries Act of 1972 (MPRSA), Ocean Dumping Act is one of several key environmental laws passed by the US Congress in 1972. The Act has two essential aims: to regulate intentional ocean disposal of materials, and to authorize any related research. While the MPRSA regulates the ocean dumping of waste and provides for a research program on ocean dumping, it also provides for the designation and regulation of marine sanctuaries referred to as the National Marine Sanctuaries Act. The act regulates the ocean dumping of all material beyond the territorial limit (3 miles (4.8 km) from shore) and prevents or strictly limits dumping material that "would adversely affect human health, welfare, or amenities, or the marine environment, ecological systems, or economic potentialities". The MPRSA authorized the Environmental Protection Agency (EPA) to regulate ocean dumping of materials including, but not limited to, industrial waste, sewage sludge, biological agents, radioactive agents, NBC (nuclear, biological, and chemical), garbage, chemicals, and biological and laboratory, as well as other wastes, into the territorial waters of the United States through a permit program. The EPA can issue permits for dumping of materials other than dredge spoils if the agency determines, through a full public notice and process, that the discharge will not unreasonably degrade or endanger human health or welfare or the marine environment. The law also has provisions related to creating marine sanctuaries, conducting ocean disposal research and monitoring coastal water quality.

== Ocean Dumping Code ==
Ocean Dumping

Table 1. Major U.S. Code Sections of the Marine Protection, Research, and Sanctuaries Act (codified as 33 U.S.C. 1401–1445, 16 U.S.C. 1431-1447f, 33 U.S.C. 2801–2805).
| | Section Title | Ocean Dumping Act |
|---|---|---|
33 U.S.C
| 1401 | Congressional findings, declaration of policy | Sec. 2 |
| 1401 | Definitions | Sec. 3 |
Title I - Permit Program
| 1411 | Prohibited acts | Sec. 101 |
| 1412 | Environmental Protection Agency permits | Sec. 102 |
| 1413 | Corps of Engineers permits | Sec. 103 |
| 1414 | Permit conditions | Sec. 104 |
| 1414a | Special provisions regarding certain dumping sites | Sec. 104A |
| 1414b | Ocean dumping of sewage sludge and industrial waste | Sec. 104B |
| 1414c | Prohibition on disposal of sewage sludge at landfills on Staten Island | Sec. 104C |
| 1415 | Penalties | Sec. 105 |
| 1416 | Relationship to other laws | Sec. 106 |
| 1417 | Enforcement | Sec. 107 |
| 1418 | Regulations | Sec. 108 |
| 1419 | International cooperation | Sec. 109 |
| 1420 | Authorization of appropriations | Sec. 111 |
| 1421 | Annual report to Congress | Sec. 112 |
Title II - Research Programs
| 1441 | Monitoring and research programs | Sec. 201 |
| 1442 | Research on long-term effects | Sec. 202 |
| 1443 | Research program - ocean dumping and other methods | Sec. 203 |
| 1444 | Annual reports | Sec. 204 |
| 1445 | Authorization of appropriations | Sec. 205 |
| Title III - Marine Sanctuaries | National Marine Sanctuaries Act | |
Title IV - Regional Marine Research Programs
16 U.S.C.
| 1447 | Purposes | Sec. 401 |
| 1447a | Definitions | Sec. 402 |
| 1447b | Regional marine research boards | Sec. 403 |
| 1447c | Regional research plans | Sec. 404 |
| 1447d | Research grant program | Sec. 405 |
| 1447e | Report on research program | Sec. 406 |
| 1447f | Authorization of appropriations | Sec. 407 |
Title V - National Coastal Monitoring System
33 U.S.C.
| 2801 | Purposes | Sec. 501 |
| 2802 | Definitions | Sec. 502 |
| 2803 | Comprehensive coastal water quality monitoring program | Sec. 503 |
| 2804 | Report to Congress | Sec. 504 |
| 2805 | Authorization of appropriations | Sec. 505 |

== Responsible agencies ==
There are four federal agencies that share responsibilities under the Ocean Dumping Act:

- U.S. Environmental Protection Agency (EPA)
- U.S. Army Corps of Engineers
- National Oceanic and Atmospheric Administration(NOAA)
- U.S. Coast Guard

The U.S. Environmental Protection Agency (EPA) is the primary agency that is in charge of regulating the disposal of all substances that are disposed in the ocean; this agency also authorize the research and demonstration of activities that have to do with phasing out sewage and industrial waste disposing. The U.S. Army Corps of Engineers agency is in charge of dredged spoils. The National Oceanic and Atmospheric Administration (NOAA) is in charge of the research on the changes of the marine environment that are caused by humans. The U.S. Coast Guard is in charge of the surveillance of ocean dumping.

The NOAA National Marine Sanctuary program manages a network of underwater areas that are protected by the US. These special bodies of water, like oceans and lakes, are protected by Congress to keep natural and cultural resources while allowing people to enjoy the waters. The Marine Protection, Research, Sanctuaries Act gives way for a national network of marine sanctuaries that are administered by NOAA. The NOAA was created in 1970 after an oil spill 30 miles of the coast of California released 235,000 gallons of crude oil into the ocean. As time passes and technology advances, the NOAA has added sanctuaries all over the US. Three sites followed from 1992, with Congress designating Stellwagen Bank National Marine Sanctuary in Massachusetts and Monterey Bay National Marine Sanctuary in California.

== Title I - Permit Program ==
Title I of the MPRSA prohibits all ocean dumping, except that allowed by permits issued by the EPA Administrator pursuant to Section 102 of the MPRSA, in any ocean waters under U.S. jurisdiction, by any U.S. vessel, or by any vessel sailing from a U.S. port. EPA designates sites for ocean dumping and specifies in each permit where the material is to be disposed.

In 1973, the EPA permitted two interim chemical disposal sites in the Gulf of Mexico, as described in the report, Assessing Potential Ocean Pollutants, published by the National Academy of Sciences (NAS, 1975) https://books.google.com/books/about/Assessing_Potential_Ocean_Pollutants.html?id=eicQOgkswusC. At Site A, uncontained wastes were discharged through a submerged pipe into the turbulent wake of a barge. At Site B, waste materials were placed in barrels before discharge. Chemical wastes discharged at these sites reportedly had various concentrations of chlorinated hydrocarbons, calcium and sodium metals, formaldehyde, cyanide and other metals (i.e. antimony, mercury, arsenic, zinc, manganese, and iron). Seven permits issued by the EPA in 1973 for the period of May 1 to November 1 allowed for the disposal of 84,500 tons of uncontained waste at Site A and 208,500 waste barrels at Site B, of which 55,000 barrels contained chlorinated hydrocarbons. By July 1973, four companies with plants at 7 locations were using Sites A and B (NAS, 1975).

Nearly all of the ocean dumping that takes place today is dredged materials at the hands of the Corps of Engineers and due to the fact that they are the entity primarily responsible for the dredging, they issue permits for ocean dumping of such materials. The dredged materials are sediments removed from the bottom of water bodies, but before they are dumped in the ocean, they must be evaluated to ensure that they are not harmful to human health or to the marine environment.

The basic objective of the permit program is to "prevent or strictly limit the dumping into ocean waters of any material that would adversely affect human health, welfare, or amenities, or the marine environment, ecosystems, or economic potentialities." The Secretary of the Army (through the Corps of Engineers) is authorized to issue permits for dredged material disposal, and EPA is authorized to designate appropriate dump sites.

Dumping restrictions were enacted for both U.S. flag vessels and materials transported from a location outside the U.S. With respect to the latter category, dumping was prohibited within the U.S. territorial sea and the U.S. contiguous zone. A specific dumping prohibition was included for radiological, chemical and biological warfare agents, high-level radioactive waste and medical wastes. Restrictions have since been placed on dumping activities in the New York Bight Apex, and sewage sludge dumping at the "106-Mile Site" offshore of New Jersey ended in 1992.

In order for anyone to dump on US waters, they must follow certain laws. Public Law 97-424, enacted in 1983, placed a 2-year prohibition on ocean dumping of any low-level radioactive waste. Public Law 100-688 terminated the dumping of sewage sludge and waste from industrial companies (commencing with the 270th day after November 18, 1988) under certain conditions. After December 31, 1991, it was prohibited to dump any type of sewage sludge and industrial waste. This law gives EPA the authority to issue emergency permits for the dumping of industrial waste into ocean waters if an unacceptable human health risk exists and no other alternative is available.

Statutes authorizing appropriations to implement Title I were enacted annually through 1977 and, thereafter, in 1980, 1981, and 1988. The 1988 amendments authorized appropriations of $12 million for Title I for each of Fiscal Years 1989 through 1991.

== Title II - Research Programs ==
Title II of the Act authorizes the Secretary of Commerce (through the National Oceanic and Atmospheric Administration (NOAA)) to coordinate a research and monitoring program with the EPA and the United States Coast Guard. The NOAA conducts general research on ocean resources and is responsible for research on the effects of ocean dumping, pollution, overfishing, and other issues caused by humans that cause changes in the marine ecosystem. The EPA's research is related to the phasing out of ocean disposal activities and its role includes conducting research, surveys, investigations, experiments, training, demonstrations, and studies to aid in their search for dumping alternatives.

This program is designed as a long-term research program to study the "possible long-range effects of pollution, overfishing, and man-induced changes of ocean ecosystems" and to conduct the research required to find dumping alternatives and to consider, in cooperation with other federal agencies, the feasibility of regional management plans for waste disposal in coastal areas. Congressional reports are required annually.

Statutes providing authority for appropriations were enacted in 1972, 1975, 1976, 1977, 1980, 1986 and 1988. Public Law 100-627 authorized appropriations of $13.5 million for Title II for Fiscal Year 1989, and $14.5 million for Fiscal Year 1990.

== Title III - Marine Sanctuaries ==
Title III allows the Secretary of Commerce to designate discrete areas as National Marine Sanctuaries after conferring with the heads of involved federal agencies and state and local governments, as appropriate. The establishment of these sanctuaries is important in helping to promote comprehensive management of their special conservation, recreational, ecological, historical, research, educational, or aesthetic resources. The importance and primary objective of a sanctuary is to protect its features and allow the ocean to be used in a natural and sustainable way. Sanctuaries provide a safe haven for endangered species, or those close to extinction, while also serving educational purposes for students and researchers alike to promote understanding and stewardship of our oceans.

Public Law 96-332 provides that any marine sanctuary designation will not be effective if the Governor of an affected state finds it unacceptable, or if Congress form a concurrent of dissproval (must occur within 60 days). The Secretary of Commerce is authorized to withdraw the designation after any such State or Congressional disapproval. If the designation is not withdrawn, only the portion certified as acceptable can take effect.

== Title IV - Regional Marine Research Programs ==
Title IV of the MPRSA established nine regional marine research boards for the purpose of developing comprehensive marine research plans, considering water quality and ecosystem conditions and research and monitoring priorities and objectives in each region. The plans, after approval by the NOAA and EPA, are to guide NOAA in awarding research grants funds under this title of the act. The Regional Marine Research Act was enacted in recognition of the value of the Nation's coastal marine waters and the need for regional research to safeguard their quality and health. The main focus of this program is to establish regional marine research programs around the country and to provide sustained federal funding for planned research within each region. Five Major Sections of the Gulf of Maine Regional Marine Research Program: 1. An overview of marine environmental quality in the region. 2. An inventory of current research activities. 3. A statement of the research needs and priorities within the context of a 10-year goal. 4. An assessment of how the plan will incorporate existing research and management in the region 5. A description and schedule of the research objectives for the region during the 4-year period covered by the plan.

== Title V - National Coastal Monitoring System ==
Title V launched a national coastal water quality monitoring program that directs the EPA and NOAA together to implement a long-term program to collect and analyze scientific data on the environmental quality of coastal ecosystems, including ambient water quality, health and quality of living resources, sources of environmental degradation, and data on trends. Results of these actions are used to provide the information required to devise and execute effective programs under the Clean Water Act and Coastal Zone Management Act.

== Amendments ==
In 1977, Congress amended the Act to require that dumping of municipal sewage sludge or industrial wastes, which unreasonably degrade the environment, to cease by December 1981. Because that deadline was not achieved, amendments were passed in 1988 that extended the deadline to December 1991. In 1986 amendments, Congress directed that ocean disposal of all wastes end at the traditional 12-mile site off the New York/New Jersey coast and that they be moved to a new site 106 miles offshore. Congress amended the Act again in 1992, giving permission to states to adopt ocean dumping standards more stringent than federal standards and to require that permits conform with long-term management plans for designated dumpsites. This amendment was put into place to ensure that permitted activities are consistent with expected uses of the site.

Table 2. Ocean Dumping Act and Amendments (codified as 33 U.S.C. 1401–1445, 16 U.S.C. 1431-1447f, 33 U.S.C. 2801–2805).
| Year | Act | Public Law Number |
|---|---|---|
| 1972 | Marine Protection, Research, and Sanctuaries Act | P.L. 92-532 |
| 1974 | London Dumping Convention Implementation | P.L. 93-254 |
| 1977 | Authorization of appropriations | P.L. 95-153 |
| 1980 | Authorization of appropriations | P.L. 96-381 |
| 1980 | Authorization of appropriations | P.L. 96-572 |
| 1982 | Surface Transportation Assistance Act | P.L. 97-424 |
| 1986 | Budget Reconciliation | P.L. 99-272, §§6061-6065 |
| 1986 | Water Resources Development Act | P.L. 99-662, §§21 1, 728, 1172 |
| 1987 | Water Quality Act of 1987 | P.L. 100–4, §508 |
| 1988 | Ocean dumping research amendments | P.L. 100–627, title I |
| 1988 | Ocean Dumping Ban Act | P.L. 100–688, title I |
| 1988 | U.S. Public Vessel Medical Waste Anti-Dumping | P.L. 100–688, title III Act of 1988 |
| 1990 | Regional marine research centers | P.L. 101–593, title III |
| 1992 | National Coastal Monitoring Act | P.L. 102–567, title V |
| 1992 | Water Resource Development Act | P.L. 102–580, §§504-510 |

== Enforcement ==
The violation of a permit or permit requirement carries a civil penalty of not more than $75,000 per violation that is assessed by the EPA. The organization is also authorized to assess criminal penalties that carry fines up to $250,000, 5 years in prison, or both for violations of the act. Additionally, fines are assessed for ocean dumping of medical wastes that carry the same penalties previously listed. Like many other federal environmental laws, the Ocean Dumping Act allows individuals to bring a citizen suit in U.S. district court against any person, including the United States, for violation of a permit or other prohibition, limitation, or criterion issued under title I of the Act.

Under certain circumstances, each of the states is permitted to regulate ocean dumping in waters within their own jurisdiction. The Ocean Dumping Act requires that the EPA Administrator applies the standards and criteria binding upon the United States that are stated in the 1972 Convention on the Prevention of Marine Pollution by Dumping of Wastes and Other Matters. During this convention, more than 85 countries agreed in the prohibition of dumping in the ocean the next elements: mercury, cadmium and other substances such as DDT and PCBs, solid wastes and persistent plastics, oil, high-level radioactive wastes, and chemical and biological warfare agents; and requires special permits for other heavy metals, cyanides and fluorides, and medium- and low-level radioactive wastes.

== See also ==
- 1972 in the environment, for related contemporaneous events that year
- Operation CHASE
- Marine debris
- MARPOL 73/78 (1973 & 1978 treaties)
- OSPAR Convention
- Water Framework Directive (European Union)
- London Convention on the Prevention of Marine Pollution by Dumping of Wastes and Other Matter (1972)
