= Coastal sediment transport =

Movement of sediment along coastal environments

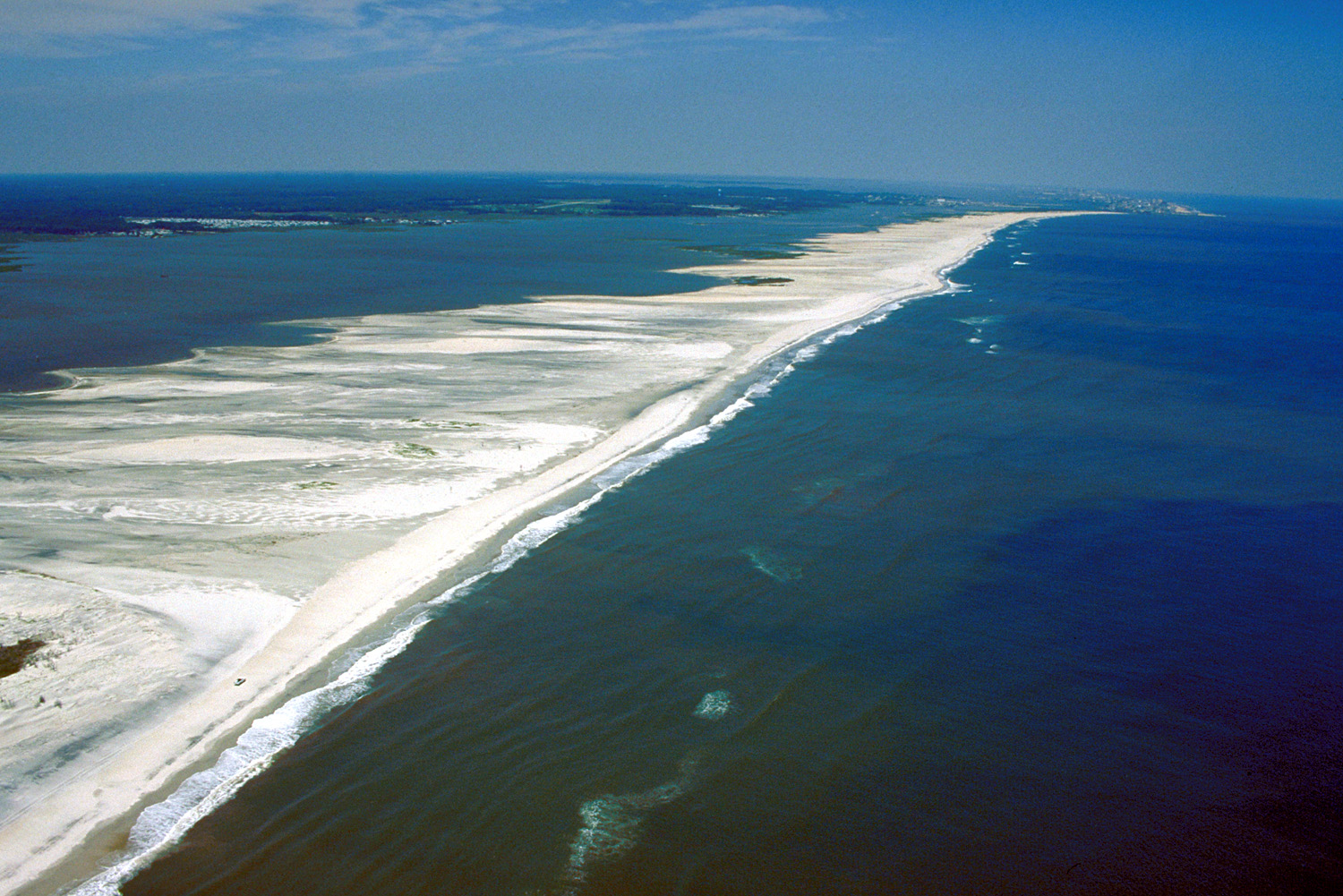
Assateague Island

Coastal sediment transport (a subset of sediment transport) is the interaction of coastal land forms to various complex interactions of physical processes. The primary agent in coastal sediment transport is wave activity (see Wind wave), followed by tides and storm surge (see Tide and Storm surge), and near shore currents (see Sea#Currents) . Wind-generated waves play a key role in the transfer of energy from the open ocean to the coastlines. In addition to the physical processes acting upon the shore, the size distribution of the sediment is a critical determination for how the beach will change (see Grain size determination). These various interactions generate a wide variety of beaches. (see Beach). Other than the interactions between coastal land forms and physical processes there is also the addition of modification of these landforms through anthropogenic sources (see human modifications). Some of the anthropogenic sources of modification have been put in place to halt erosion or prevent harbors from filling up with sediment. In order to assist community planners, local governments, and national governments a variety of models have been developed to predict the changes of beach sediment transport at coastal locations. Typically, during large wave events, the sediment gets transported off the beach face and deposited offshore generating a sandbar. Once the significant wave event has diminished, the sediment then gets slowly transported back onshore.

== History ==
In the mid-1970s a significant amount of attention was paid to coastal sediment transport. In part, due to the National Sea Grant College Program and the U.S. Congress Mandated Sea Grant Act of 1976. One of the research areas included "the development and the experimental verification of hydrodynamic laws governing the transport of marine sediments in the flow fields occurring in coastal waters." From this request for research, the Office of Sea Grant reviewed, accepted, and funded the Nearshore Sediment Transport Study (NSTS). Due to unforeseen complications the NSTS conducted only two major field experiments and a validation experiment. This was a significant contribution to the field of coastal sediment transport and helped initialize a great deal of future research.

== Glossary ==
shore
zone between the water's edge at normal low tide and the landward limit of effective wave action.
shoreline
the water's edge, migrating up and down with the tide.
foreshore
exposed at low tide and submerged at high tide.
backshore
extending above normal high tide level.
nearshore zone
between shoreline and the line where the waves begin to break.
beach
an accumulation of loose sediment sometimes confined to the backshore but often extending across the foreshore as well.

== Beach profile measurements ==
A variety of measurements are used to determine the beach profile, sediment grain size, and various other important parameters to determine what is influencing coastal sediment transport. Below are a few of the multitude.

=== Coastal research amphibious buggy (CRAB) ===
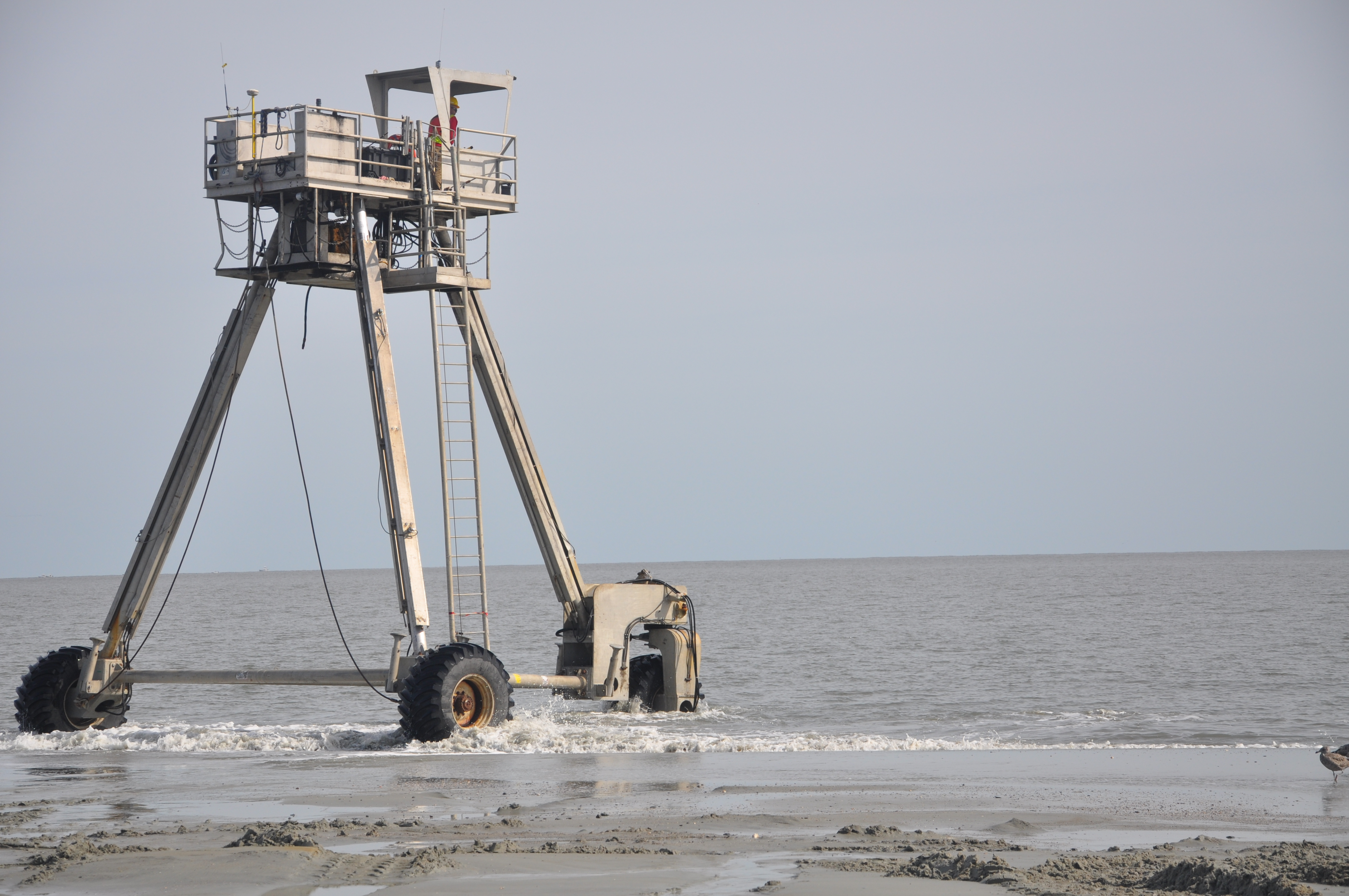
Coastal research amphibious buggy (CRAB)

A three-wheeled vehicle deployed at the beach to measure the beach profile. (more information can be found at )

=== Emory beach profile measurement ===
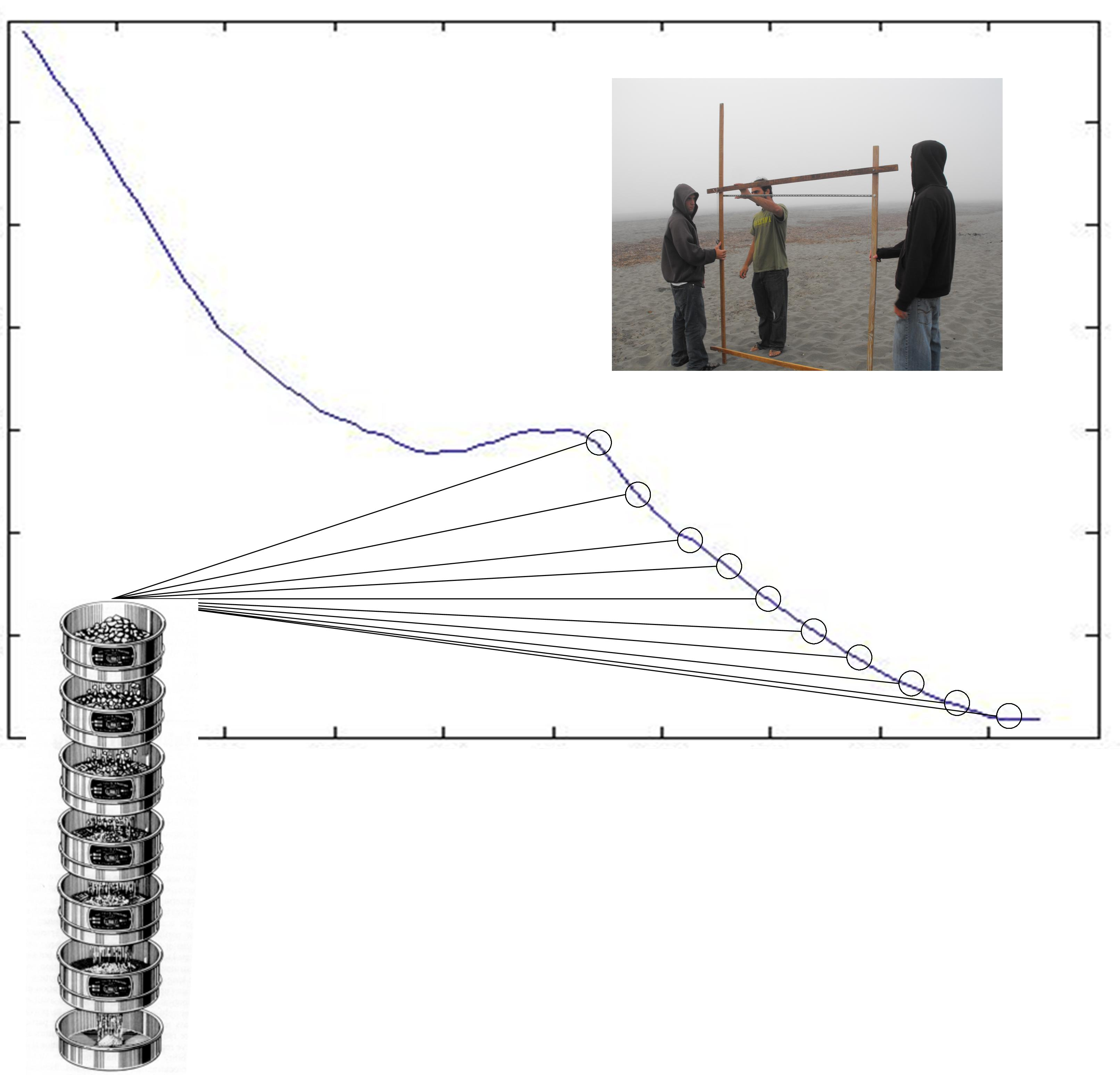
A simple depiction of measuring a beach profile and compiling a median grain size.

In order to determine what the profile of a beach looks like, one method for determination is the Emory Beach Profiling Method. Initiating a benchmark, the researcher establishes a control point to start the surveys at. Typically this is far enough away from the swash zone that large changes in elevation will not occur during the sampling time. Once the initial benchmark is established, the researcher will take the Emory sampling device and measure the change in elevation over the distance the device is covering. Then, they will pick up the device and move it to the end point of their last survey, and so on. Until they reach the shoreline. Typically this is done during neap tide (see Tide for more information on neap tide).

=== Grain size determination ===
Since the sand grain diameters can vary throughout the entire beach the median grain size is used to determine sediment fall velocity. Determining sediment fall velocity allows the determination of what sediment is left where.

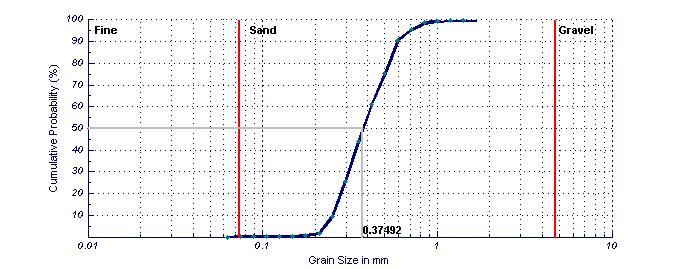
probability curve for beach face sediment distribution, how to obtain D50

== Human modifications ==
- Sea walls
- Groynes
- Breakwaters
- Dredging of harbor entrances
- Dumping of material on the coast and offshore
- Reduction of coastal vegetation (cutting, burning, grazing, pollution)

== Models ==
Models for the prediction of sediment transport in coastal regions have been used since the mid 1970s. One of the first formulas to calculate coastal sediment transport was developed by Eco Bijker end of sixties. Some transport models are:

- XBeach (http://oss.deltares.nl/web/xbeach/)
- Profile Parameter P
- Engineering tools and databases on Sediment Transport and Morphology (http://www.leovanrijn-sediment.com/page4.html)
- DHI's MIKE software (http://www.mikepoweredbydhi.com/products/mike-21/sediments)
- DELFT3D (http://oss.deltares.nl/web/delft3d/home)
- TELEMAC-MASCARET: SISYPHE - Sediment transport and bed evolution (http://www.opentelemac.org/index.php/modules-list/164-sysiphe-sediment-transport-and-bed-evolution)
- CoastalME (Coastal Modelling Environment - https://earthwise.bgs.ac.uk/index.php/Category:Coastal_Modeling_Environment)
