= International Convention for the Prevention of Pollution of the Sea by Oil =

International Treaty signed in London in 1954

The International Convention for the Prevention of Pollution of the Sea by Oil (OILPOL) was an International Treaty signed in London on 12 May 1954 (OILPOL 54). It was updated in 1962 (OILPOL 62), 1969 (OILPOL 69), and 1971 (OILPOL 71). OILPOL was subsumed by the International Convention for the Prevention of Pollution from Ships (MARPOL) in 1973.

Since 1959, OILPOL is administered and promoted by the International Maritime Organization (IMO), which states:

The OILPOL Convention recognised that most oil pollution resulted from routine shipboard operations such as the cleaning of cargo tanks. In the 1950s, the normal practice was simply to wash the tanks out with water and then pump the resulting mixture of oil and water into the sea. OILPOL 54 prohibited the dumping of oily wastes within a certain distance from land and in 'special areas' where the danger to the environment was especially acute.

== Great Barrier Reef incident ==
On 3 March 1970, the Liberian crude oil tanker Oceanic Grandeur struck an uncharted rock in Torres Strait while en route from Dumai, Indonesia, to Brisbane. The incident resulted in a significant spill. Due to concern about the Great Barrier Reef, amendments in OILPOL 71 were provided to extend the restricted zone to the Great Barrier Reef.
