= Oil Pollution Act of 1990 =

US federal law

- Long title: Oil Pollution Act of 1990 – Public Law 101-380
- Enacted by: the 101st United States Congress
- Effective: August 18, 1990

Citations
- Public law: 101-380
- Statutes at Large: 104 Stat. 484

Codification
- Titles amended: 33 U.S.C.: Navigable Waters
- U.S.C. sections created: 33 U.S.C. ch. 40 § 2701

Legislative history
- Introduced in the House as H.R. 1465 by Walter B. Jones Sr. (D-NC) on March 16, 1989; Committee consideration by House Merchant Marine and Fisheries, House Public Works and Transportation, House Interior and Insular Affairs, House Foreign Affairs, House Science, Space and Technology; Passed the House on November 9, 1989 (375–5); Passed the Senate on November 19, 1989 (voice vote); Reported by the joint conference committee on August 1, 1990; agreed to by the Senate on August 2, 1990 (99–0) and by the House on August 4, 1990 (360–0); Signed into law by President George H. W. Bush on August 18, 1990

United States Supreme Court cases
- United States v. Locke, 529 U.S. 89 (2000); CITGO Asphalt Refining Co. v. Frescati Shipping Co., No. 18-565, 589 U.S. ___ (2020); United States v. Trafigura Trading LLC, 599 U.S. ___ (2023)

The Oil Pollution Act of 1990 (OPA) was passed by the 101st United States Congress and signed by President George H. W. Bush. It works to reduce the likelihood of oil spills from vessels and facilities by enforcing removal of spilled oil and assigning liability for the cost of cleanup and damage; requires specific operating procedures; defines responsible parties and financial liability; implements processes for measuring damages; specifies damages for which violators are liable; and establishes a fund for damages, cleanup, and removal costs. This statute has resulted in instrumental changes in the oil production, transportation, and distribution industries.

== Background ==
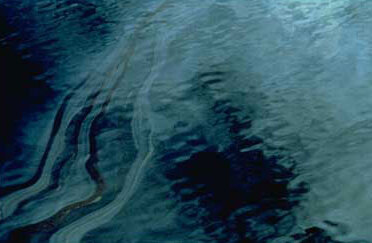
Heavy sheens of oil as visible on the surface of the water in Prince William Sound following the Exxon Valdez oil spill.

Laws governing oil spills in the United States began in 1851 with the Limitation of Liability Act. This statue, in an attempt to protect the shipping industry, stated that vessel owners were liable for incident-related costs up to the post-incident value of their vessel. The shortcomings of this law were revealed in 1967 with the release of over 100,000 tons of crude oil into the English Channel from the SS Torrey Canyon. Of the $8 million of cleanup-related costs, the owners of the Torrey Canyon were held liable for only $50—the value of the only remaining Torrey Canyon lifeboat. In the meantime, the Oil Pollution Act of 1924 had passed, but this statute only limited liability for deliberate discharge of oil into marine waters.

Two years following the Torrey Canyon spill, an oil platform eruption in the Santa Barbara Channel made national headlines and thrust oil pollution into the public spot light. As a result Congress placed oil pollution under the authority of the Water Quality Improvement Act of 1970 (later amended by the Clean Water Act in 1972). The 1970 law set specific liability limitations. For example, vessels transporting oil were liable only up to $250,000 or $150 per gross ton. These limitations rarely covered the cost of removal and cleanup, let alone damages.

In the decades to follow, several other laws that dealt with oil spill liability and compensation were passed. These statues include: the Ports and Waterways Safety Act of 1972, the Trans-Alaska Pipeline Authorization Act of 1973, the Deep Water Port Act of 1974, the Outer Continental Shelf Lands Act of 1978, and the Alaska Oil Spill Commission of 1990. However, this fragmented collection of federal and state laws provided only limited safeguards against the hazards of oils spills. In 1976, a bill to create a cohesive safe measure for oil pollution was introduced to Congress. Neither the House of Representatives nor the Senate could agree on a single statue and the bill fell out of consideration numerous times.

On March 24, 1989, the Exxon Valdez ran aground in the Prince William Sound and spilled nearly 11 million gallons of crude oil—the largest marine oil spill in recorded history up to that point. Soon afterward, in June 1989, three smaller spills occurred within coastal waters of the United States. This was timely evidence that oil spills were not uncommon.

Alaska Governor Steve Cowper authorized the creation of the Alaska Oil Spill Commission in May 1989 to examine the causes of the Exxon Valdez oil spill and issue recommendations on potential policy changes. Cowper appointed Walter B. Parker, a longtime transportation consultant and public official, as the chairman of the commission. Under Parker, the Commission issued 52 recommendations for improvements to industry, state, and federal regulations. Fifty of these recommendations were worked into the 1990 Oil Pollution Act, which was introduced into legislation on March 16, 1989 by Walter B. Jones, Sr., a Democratic Party congressman from North Carolina's 1st congressional district.

== Enactment timeline ==
- March 16, 1989: H.R. 1465, the Oil Pollution Act of 1990, was introduced in the House of Representatives.
- June 21, 1989: The Committee on Merchant Marine and Fisheries reported the bill as amended.
- November 9, 1989: H.R. 1465 was passed by a vote in the House of Representatives.
- November 19, 1989: the bill was passed by the Senate, with revisions. The bill was sent back to the House of Representatives for approval of the changes added by the Senate. However, the House of Representatives did not agree to the revisions.
- August 2, 1990: a conference committee was created, including members of both the House of Representatives and Senate, in order to resolve differences and propose a final bill for approval. Initially, the Senate agreed to the committee's final proposed report.
- August 4, 1990: both chambers of Congress had passed the bill in identical form. The final step in the legislative process was for the bill to go to the President to either approve and sign or veto it.
- August 18, 1990: the bill was signed by the President and the Oil Pollution Act was officially enacted.

== Enforcement ==
A responsible party under the Oil Pollution Act is one who is found accountable for the discharge or substantial threat of discharge of oil from a vessel or facility into navigable waters, exclusive economic zones, or the shorelines of such covered waters. Responsible parties are strictly, jointly, and severally liable for the cost of removing the oil in addition to any damages linked to the discharge. Unlike the liability for removal costs which are uncapped, liability for damages is limited as discussed in further detail below. Furthermore, the Oil Pollution Act allows for additional liability enacted by other relevant state laws.

Under the Oil Pollution Act, federal, tribal, state, and any other person can recover removal costs from a responsible party so long as such entity has incurred costs from carrying out oil removal activities in accordance with the Clean Water Act National Contingency Plan. Reimbursement claims must first be made to the responsible party. If the potentially responsible party refutes liability or fails to distribute the reimbursement within 90 days of the claim, the claimant may file suit in court or bring the claim to the Oil Spill Liability Trust Fund described below. In some instances, claims for removal cost reimbursement can be initially brought to the Oil Spill Liability Trust Fund thus sidestepping the responsible party. For example, claimants advised by the U.S. Environmental Protection Agency (EPA), governors of affected states and American claimants for incidents involving foreign vessels or facilities may initially present their claims to the Oil Spill Liability Trust Fund. When claims for removal cost reimbursement are brought to the fund, the claimant must prove that removal costs were sustained from activities required to avoid or alleviate effects of the incident and that such actions were approved or directed by the federal on-scene coordinator.

In a manner similar to that described above, costs for damages can be recovered from a responsible party. However, the Oil Pollution Act only covers certain categories of damages. These categories include: natural resource damages, damages to real or personal property, loss of subsistence use, loss of government revenues, loss of profits or impaired earning capacity, damaged public services, and damage assessment costs. Additionally, some categories are recoverable for any person impacted by the incident while others are only recoverable by federal, tribal, and state governments. Furthermore, the act proscribes limits to liability for damages based on the responsible party, the particular incident, and the type of vessel or facility from which the discharge occurred.

The Oil Spill Liability Trust Fund is a trust fund managed by the federal government and financed by a per-barrel tax on crude oil produced domestically in the United States and on petroleum products imported to the United States for consumption. The fund was created in 1986, but use of the fund was not authorized until the Oil Pollution Act's passage in 1990. The funds may be called upon to cover the cost of federal, tribal, state, and claimant oil spill removal actions and damage assessments as well as unpaid liability and damages claims. No more than one billion dollars may be withdrawn from the fund per spill incident. Over two decades of court cases have demonstrated that obtaining funding from the Oil Pollution Spill Liability Fund can be a difficult task.

== Concerns and reactions ==
President Bush acknowledged the changes the world would have to endure when signing the Oil Pollution Act and as a result, he pushed the Senate to quickly ratify the new international protocols. The reactions from industries were negative. Industry objected that the act would hinder the free flow in the trade of imported oil in the Waters of the United States. Not only does the OPA impose restrictions on trading imported oil overseas, but it also implements the state oil liability and compensation statutes, which they view as further restricting free trade. After OPA was enacted, the shipping industry threatened to boycott the ports of the United States to protest this new industry liability in both federal and state laws. In particular, the oil and shipping industries objected to the inconsistency between the OPA and the international, federal and state laws that are impacted. As a result of the OPA enactment, certain insurance companies refused to issue certifications of financial liability under the act to avoid potential responsibility and compensation in the case of a disaster.

President Bush also predicted that the enactment of the OPA could lead to larger oil shipping companies being replaced by the smaller shipping companies to avoid liability. In particular, smaller companies with limited resources would lack the finances to remediate oil spill disasters. Not just the oil industry, but also the vessel owners and operators would be held liable for an oil spill, facing a significant increase in financial responsibility. The OPA's liability increase for vessel owners raised fears and concerns from the vast majority of the shipping industry. Vessel owners objected that additional oil spill penalties imposed by the states are free from OPA limitations of the Limitation of Liability Act of 1851. Ultimately, the threat of unlimited liability under the OPA and other state statutes has led countless oil shipping companies to reduce oil trade to and from the ports of the United States.

However, there were positive reactions from the oil industries despite the newly enforced codes and regulations. In 1990, the oil industry united to form the Marine Spill Response Corporation (MSRC), a non-profit corporation whose expenses would be compensated by the oil producers and transporters. The major MSRC responsibility was to develop new response plans for oil spills cleanups and for the OPA-required remediation. Shipping companies like the Exxon Shipping reacted positively to OPA's efforts to reduce their risk of liability for oil spill disasters. To help ensure OPA compliance, Exxon Shipping compiled all state and federal regulations to which they must abide. Several independent and non-U.S. companies and operators, however, may avoid operations in the United States ports due to the OPA liability. Though the majority of elicited reactions and criticism from the enactment of OPA has been negative, it has nevertheless led to founding and designing safer requirements for ships and global oil trade.

== Long-term effects of OPA ==
The Oil Pollution act imposes long-term impacts due to the potential for unlimited liability and the statute's that hold insurers to serve as guarantors, which has ultimately resulted in the refusal of insurance companies to issue agreements of financial liability to vessel operators and owners. Thus, the inability to acquire proof of financial liability results in vessels not being able to legally enter waters of the United States. Since OPA does not exempt vessel creditors to enter U.S. waters, there is a disincentive for any lender to finance fleet modernization and or replacement. Lastly, OPA has the ability to directly impact the domestic oil production industry due to the rigorous offshore facility provisions.

1. Financial responsibility: The U.S. Coast Guard is responsible for the implementation of the vessel provisions mandated by the Oil Pollution Act. Pursuant to the OPA, vessel owners need evidence of financial liability that covers complete responsibility of a disaster if their vessel weighs more than 300 gross tons. Vessel owners are required by OPA to apply to the Coast Guard to acquire a "Certificate of Financial Responsibility" that serves as proof of their ability to financially responsible for cleanup and damages of an oil spill. In the case of an uncertified vessel entering the waters of the United States, the vessel will have to be forfeited to the United States. This is not a new protocol because vessel owners were always mandated to acquire certificates under the Clean Water Act and Comprehensive Environmental Response Compensation and Liability Act of 1980 (CERCLA). Since 2011, over 23,000 vessels have obtained the Coast Guard certificates to allow access to waters of the U.S.
2. Disincentives for fleet replacement and modernization: Since the Oil Pollution Act holds the vessel owners fully liable, it has created a disincentive for oil companies to transport crude oil in their vessels and for charterers to transport their oil on the most suitable vessels. Many financially successful oil companies select the highest quality of ships to transport their products, however, other companies continue to transport their product on the lower quality, older vessels due to the cheaper costs. The majority of charterers refuse to pay more for higher grade vessels despite the liability and compensation regulations enforced by OPA. The new and safer double hull tanker vessels are approximately 15-20% more costly to operate. In 1992, approximately 60% of global vessels was at least fifteen years old or older. The major oil companies are still delaying the fleet replacement requirement of retiring single hull vessels mandated by OPA. For example, Exxon and Texaco have delayed the replacement of their single hull vessels for new double-hulled ships. However, companies like Chevron and Mobil have ordered two new double hull tankers. Leading by example, other independent shipping companies to invest in new double hull tankers as well. Despite the change from single to double tanker vessels, it is still insufficient to accommodate the needs of the oil industry. It is expected that over the next decade there will be a serious lack of suitable tonnage to meet the expected demand for newer vessels. It is estimated that the global oil industry must invest approximately 200-350 billion dollars to meet global demands for new and environmentally sound vessels.
3. Domestic production: In the Oil Pollution Act, the Coast Guard is in charge of screening the application process for vessels. The Bureau of Ocean Energy Management (BOEM) in the Department of the Interior implements and enforces all of the act's regulations for offshore oil facilities. Under OPA, the responsible parties are mandated to provide evidence declaring financial responsibility of $150 million for potential liability. If a party is unable to provide evidence declaring financial responsibility of $150 million, they will be subject to pay a penalty of $25,000 per day in violation of OPA and may also be subject to judicial decision of terminating all operations.

Before enactment of the OPA, offshore facilities were required to provide evidence that declared financial responsibility of $35 million. Under OPA these offshore facilities had to increase their proof of financial responsibility by four times, and OPA's requirement of financial responsibility expanded to include facilities in state waters as well. Facilities in state waters that are subject to the $150 million requirement includes pipelines, marina fuel docks, tanks, and oil production facilities that are located in, on, or under state coastal waters, and are adjacent to inland channels, lakes, and wetlands. The most evident impact of the enactment of OPA, is on the oil producers within the Gulf of Mexico. Many offshore facilities are located in the Gulf of Mexico and in the marshes and wetlands of Louisiana. Major producers are most likely able to meet OPA's requirement of financial responsibility, however, the major oil companies within the Gulf of Mexico have largely withdrawn the operation of their offshore facilities.

Due to environmental pressures and the restrictive governmental regulations enforced by OPA, substantial proposals of exploration and production in the United States have been withdrawn. As a result of major companies withdrawing their plans to drill, many smaller, independent producers had entered to make a profit. By October 1993, 93% of all oil and natural gas exploration and drilling were from independent producers. Of these new exploration projects, approximately 85% of drilling operations were in the Gulf of Mexico. The independent oil producers generated nearly 40% of the crude oil in the United States and 60% of domestic natural gas.

== International treaties ==
In the case of oil pollution caused by other nations (especially ships), International treaties such as the International Convention on Civil Liability for Oil Pollution Damage and International Convention on Civil Liability for Bunker Oil Pollution Damage which have a similar intention as the Act, have not been signed by the United States, as it was deemed the Oil Pollution Act provided sufficient coverage.

== See also ==
- Deepwater Horizon drilling rig explosion (2010)
