= Title 33 of the United States Code =

U.S. federal statutes on navigable waters

Title 33 of the United States Code outlines the role of navigable waters in the United States Code.

- 33 U.S.C. ch. 1—Navigable Waters Generally
- 33 U.S.C. ch. 2—International Rules for Navigation at Sea
- 33 U.S.C. ch. 3—Navigation Rules for Harbors, Rivers, and Inland Waters Generally
- 33 U.S.C. ch. 4—Navigation Rules for Great Lakes and Their Connecting and Tributary Waters
- 33 U.S.C. ch. 5—Navigation Rules for Red River of the North and Rivers Emptying Into Gulf of Mexico and Tributaries
- 33 U.S.C. ch. 5A—Exemption of Navy Or Coast Guard Vessels from Certain Navigation Rules
- 33 U.S.C. ch. 6—General Duties of Ship Officers and Owners After Collision or Other Accident
- 33 U.S.C. ch. 7—Regulations For the Suppression of Piracy
- 33 U.S.C. ch. 8—Summary Trials For Certain Offenses Against Navigation Laws
- 33 U.S.C. ch. 9—Protection of Navigable Waters and of Harbor and River Improvements Generally
- 33 U.S.C. ch. 10—Anchorage Grounds And Harbor Regulations Generally
- 33 U.S.C. ch. 11—Bridges Over Navigable Waters
- 33 U.S.C. ch. 12—River and Harbor Improvements Generally
- 33 U.S.C. ch. 13—Mississippi River Commission
- 33 U.S.C. ch. 14—California Debris Commission
- 33 U.S.C. ch. 15—Flood Control
- 33 U.S.C. ch. 16—Lighthouses
- 33 U.S.C. ch. 17—National Ocean Survey
- 33 U.S.C. ch. 18—Longshore and Harbor Workers Compensation
- 33 U.S.C. ch. 19—Saint Lawrence Seaway
- 33 U.S.C. ch. 20—Pollution of the Sea by Oil
- 33 U.S.C. ch. 21—International Regulations for Preventing Collisions at Sea
- 33 U.S.C. ch. 22—Sea Grant Colleges and Marine Science Development
- 33 U.S.C. ch. 23—Pollution Control of Navigable Waters
- 33 U.S.C. ch. 24—Vessel Bridge-To-Bridge Communication
- 33 U.S.C. ch. 25—Ports and Waterways Safety Program
- 33 U.S.C. ch. 26—Water Pollution Prevention and Control
- 33 U.S.C. ch. 27—Ocean Dumping
- 33 U.S.C. ch. 28—Pollution Casualties on the High Seas: United States Intervention
- 33 U.S.C. ch. 29—Deepwater Ports
- 33 U.S.C. ch. 30—International Regulations for Preventing Collisions at Sea
- 33 U.S.C. ch. 31—Ocean Pollution Research and Development and Monitoring Planning
- 33 U.S.C. ch. 32—Inland Waterways Trust Fund
- 33 U.S.C. ch. 33—Prevention of Pollution from Ships
- 33 U.S.C. ch. 34—Inland Navigational Rules
- 33 U.S.C. ch. 35—Artificial Reefs
- 33 U.S.C. ch. 36—Water Resources Development
- 33 U.S.C. ch. 37—Organotin Antifouling Paint Control
- 33 U.S.C. ch. 38—Dumping of Medical Waste by Public Vessels
- 33 U.S.C. ch. 39—Shore Protection from Municipal or Commercial Waste
- 33 U.S.C. ch. 40—Oil Pollution
- 33 U.S.C. ch. 41—National Coastal Monitoring
- 33 U.S.C. ch. 42—Estuary Restoration
- 33 U.S.C. ch. 43—National Oceanic and Atmospheric Administration Commissioned Officer Corps
- 33 U.S.C. ch. 44—Oceans and Human Health
