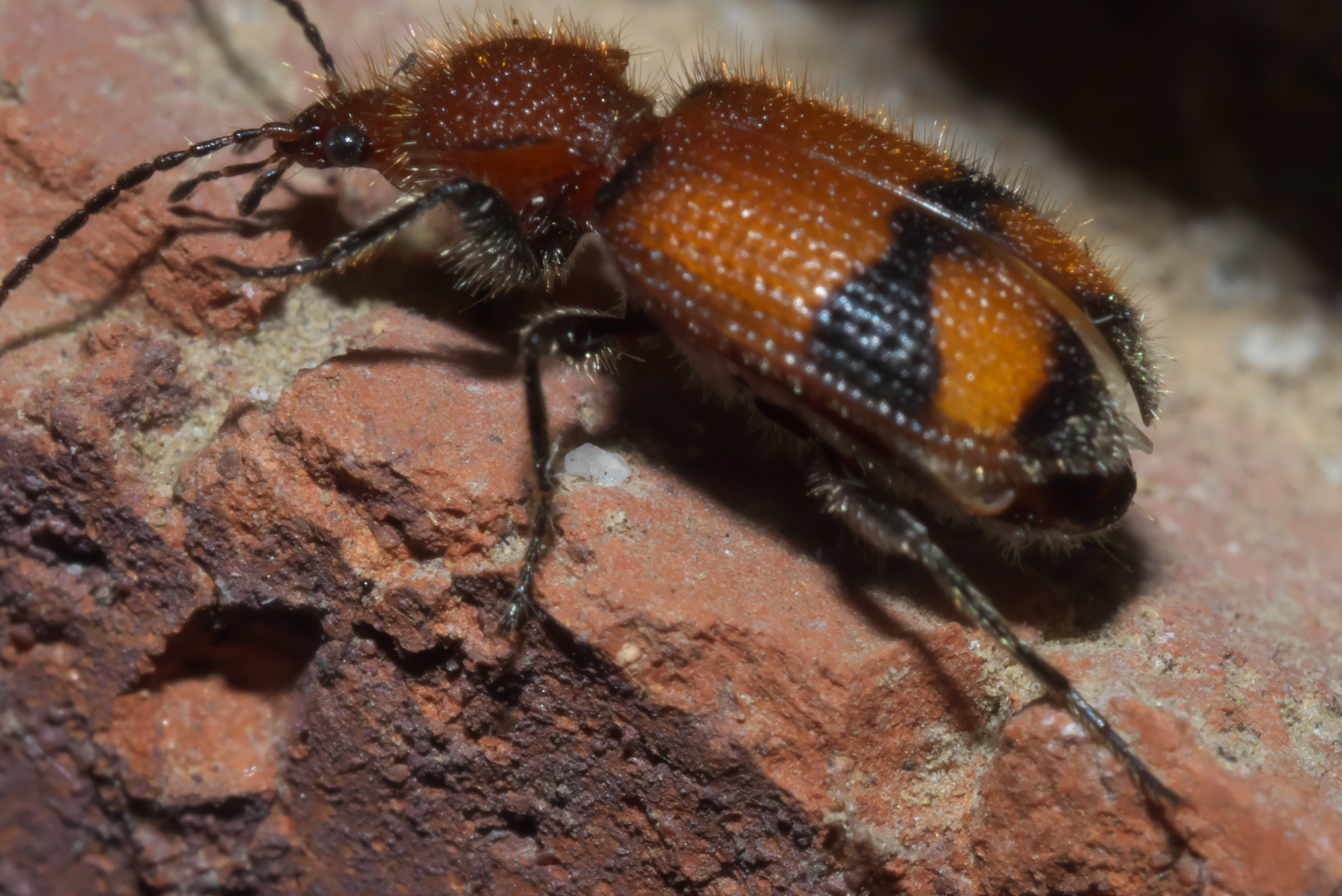
- Panagaeus fasciatus

Scientific classification
- Kingdom: Animalia
- Phylum: Arthropoda
- Class: Insecta
- Order: Coleoptera
- Suborder: Adephaga
- Family: Carabidae
- Subfamily: Panagaeinae
- Tribe: Panagaeini; Bonelli, 1810

Subtribes
- Bascanina Basilewsky, 1953; Panagaeina Bonelli, 1810

= Panagaeini =

Tribe of beetles

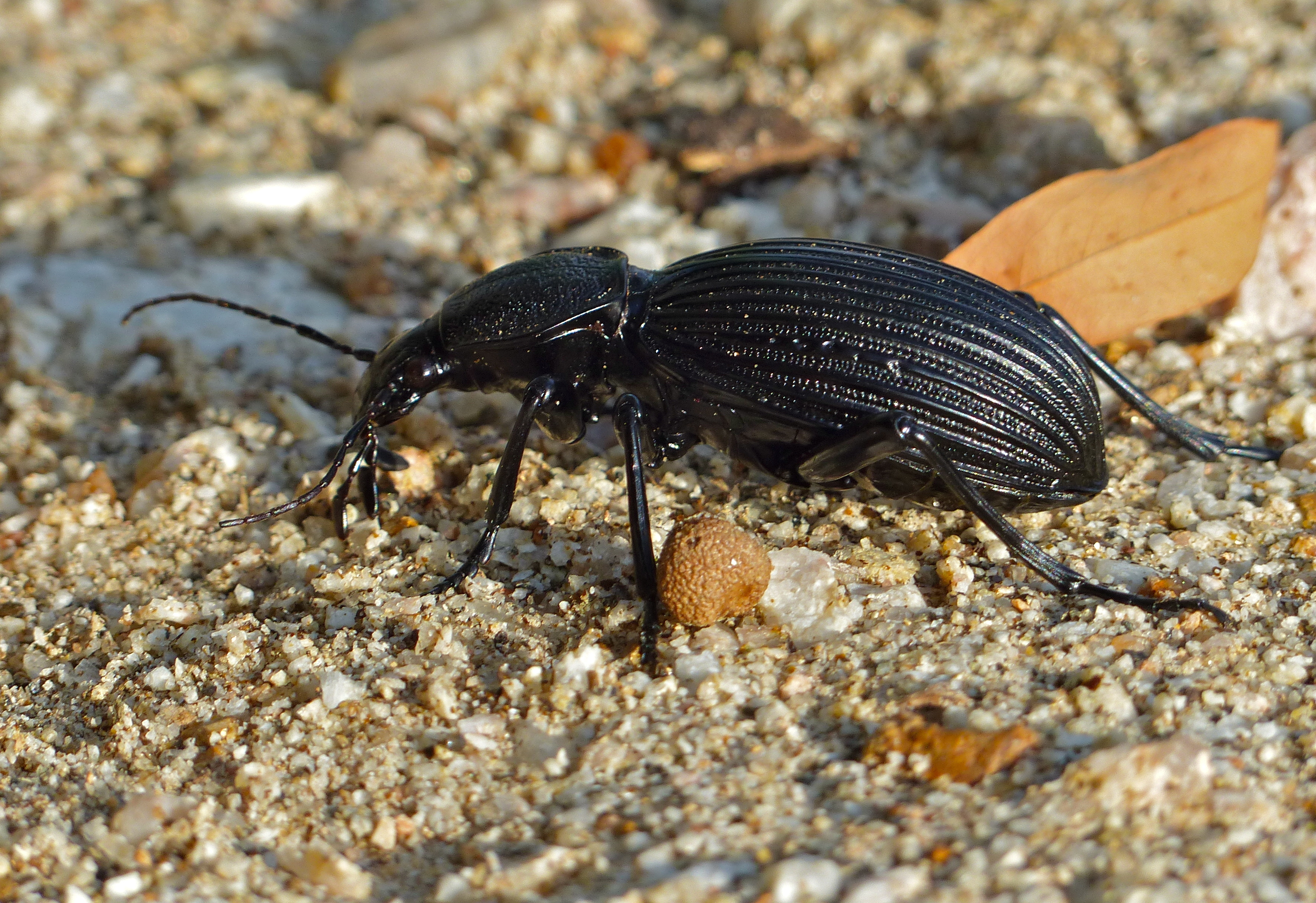
Tefflus meyerlei

Panagaeini is a tribe of ground beetles in the family Carabidae. There are more than 20 genera and 300 described species in Panagaeini.

== Genera ==
These 22 genera belong to the tribe Panagaeini:

- Adischissus Fedorenko, 2015
- Bascanus Péringuey, 1896
- Calathocosmus Emden, 1928
- Cintaroa Kasahara, 1989
- Cintaromorpha Häckel & Anichtchenko, 2016
- Coptia Brullé, 1835
- Craspedophorus Hope, 1838
- Dischissus Bates, 1873
- Epigraphodes Basilewsky, 1967
- Epigraphus Chaudoir, 1869
- Euschizomerus Chaudoir, 1850
- Geobius Dejean, 1831
- Micrixys LeConte, 1854
- Microschemus Andrewes, 1940
- Panagaeus Latreille, 1802
- Paregraphus Basilewsky, 1967
- Peronomerus Schaum, 1854
- Psecadius Alluaud, 1911
- Tefflus Leach in Samouelle, 1819
- Tinoderus Chaudoir, 1879
- Tinognathus Chaudoir, 1879
- Trichisia Motschulsky, 1865
