= Microschemus elegans =

Scientific classification
- Kingdom: Animalia
- Phylum: Arthropoda
- Class: Insecta
- Order: Coleoptera
- Suborder: Adephaga
- Family: Carabidae
- Subfamily: Panagaeinae
- Tribe: Panagaeini
- Subtribe: Panagaeina
- Genus: Microschemus
- Species: M. elegans

Binomial name
- Microschemus elegans (Dejean, 1826)

Synonyms
- Microcosmodes elegans (Dejean, 1826)

Species of beetle

Microschemus elegans is a species in the beetle family Carabidae. It is found in Pakistan, Nepal, Bangladesh, Sri Lanka, and India.
