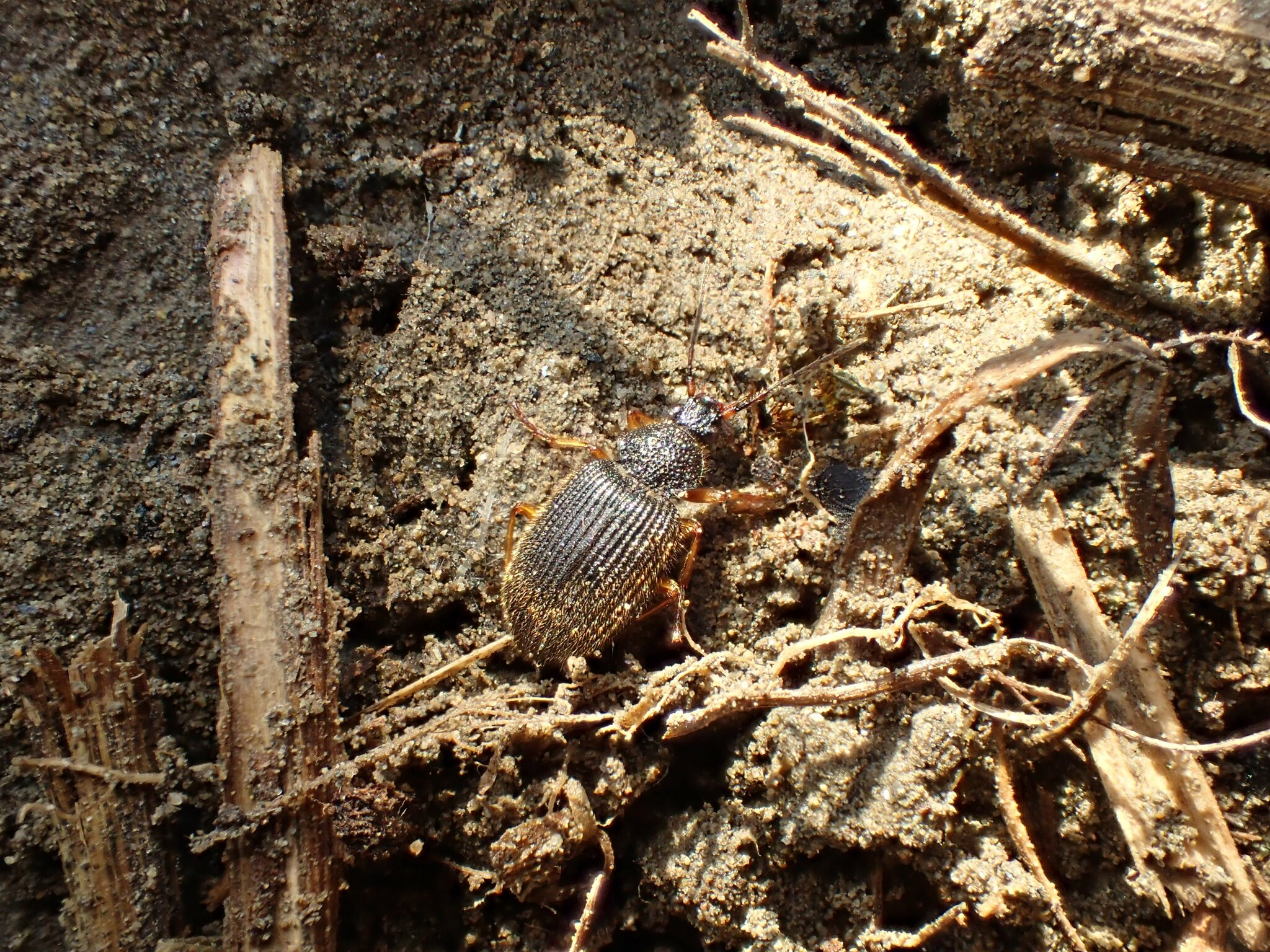
- Peronomerus nigrinus, Japan

Scientific classification
- Domain: Eukaryota
- Kingdom: Animalia
- Phylum: Arthropoda
- Class: Insecta
- Order: Coleoptera
- Suborder: Adephaga
- Family: Carabidae
- Subfamily: Panagaeinae
- Tribe: Panagaeini
- Subtribe: Panagaeina
- Genus: Peronomerus; Schaum, 1854

Synonyms
- Paronomerus Redtenbacher, 1868

= Peronomerus =

Genus of beetles

Peronomerus is a genus in the ground beetle family Carabidae. There are about six described species in Peronomerus.

== Species ==
These six species belong to the genus Peronomerus:

- Peronomerus auripilis Bates, 1883 (China, Japan, Russia)
- Peronomerus fumatus Schaum, 1854 (China, Japan, Taiwan, Bangladesh, Vietnam, Indonesia, Philippines)
- Peronomerus hornabrooki Darlington, 1971 (New Guinea)
- Peronomerus nigrinus Bates, 1873 (Japan)
- Peronomerus sagitticollis Louwerens, 1954 (Indonesia and Borneo)
- Peronomerus xanthopus Andrewes, 1936 (China, Indonesia, Philippines, New Guinea)
