= Panagaeus relictus =

Scientific classification
- Domain: Eukaryota
- Kingdom: Animalia
- Phylum: Arthropoda
- Class: Insecta
- Order: Coleoptera
- Suborder: Adephaga
- Family: Carabidae
- Genus: Panagaeus
- Species: P. relictus

Binomial name
- Panagaeus relictus Semenov & Bogachev, 1938

Species of beetle

Panagaeus relictus is a species of ground beetle in the Panagaeinae subfamily that can be found in Tajikistan, Turkmenistan, and Uzbekistan.
