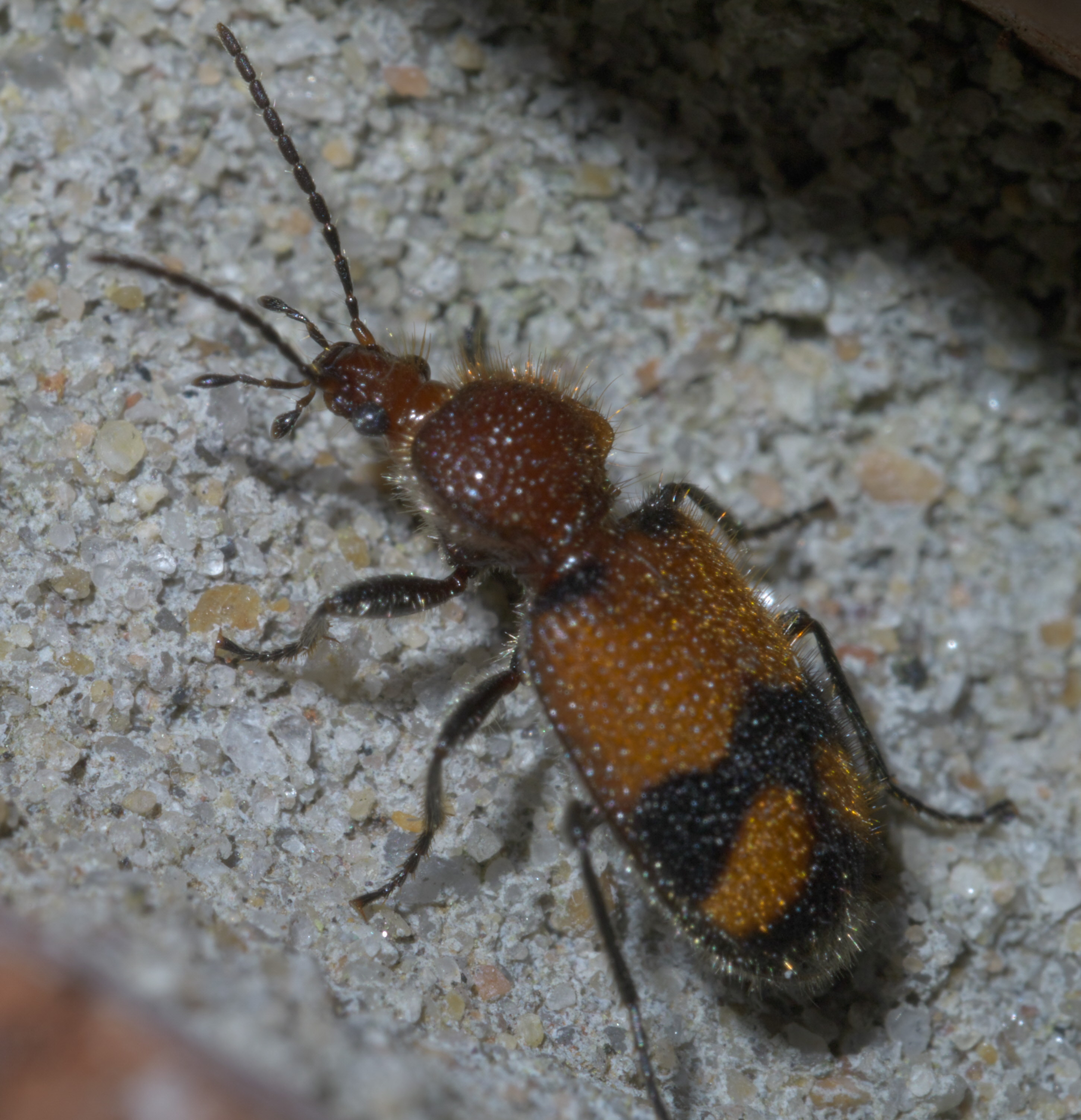

Scientific classification
- Domain: Eukaryota
- Kingdom: Animalia
- Phylum: Arthropoda
- Class: Insecta
- Order: Coleoptera
- Suborder: Adephaga
- Family: Carabidae
- Genus: Panagaeus
- Species: P. fasciatus

Binomial name
- Panagaeus fasciatus Say, 1823

= Panagaeus fasciatus =

Species of beetle

Panagaeus fasciatus is a species of ground beetle in the Panagaeinae subfamily that can be found in the US and Canada. The species is orange coloured with two black lines going across its pronotum. It is 5 millimetres (0.20 in) in length. It prefers dry forests, in such states as Arizona and Kansas.
