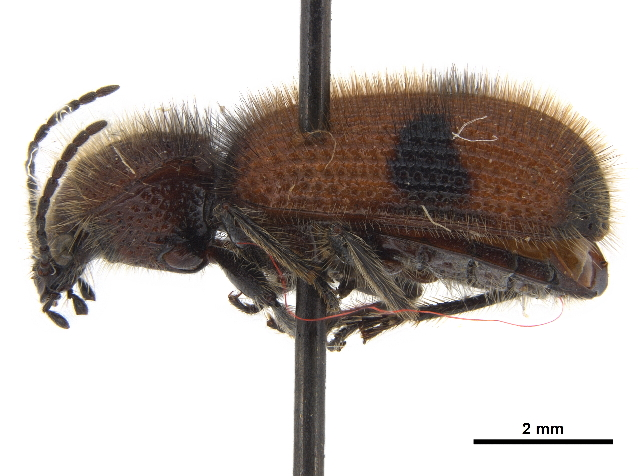
- Micrixys distincta

Scientific classification
- Kingdom: Animalia
- Phylum: Arthropoda
- Class: Insecta
- Order: Coleoptera
- Suborder: Adephaga
- Family: Carabidae
- Subfamily: Panagaeinae
- Tribe: Panagaeini
- Genus: Micrixys; LeConte, 1854

Synonyms
- Eugnathus LeConte, 1853

= Micrixys =

Genus of beetles

Micrixys is a genus in the ground beetle family Carabidae. There are at least two described species in Micrixys.

== Species ==
These two species belong to the genus Micrixys:

- Micrixys distincta (Haldeman, 1852) (United States)
- Micrixys mexicana Van Dyke, 1927 (Mexico)
