= Cintaroa =

Scientific classification
- Domain: Eukaryota
- Kingdom: Animalia
- Phylum: Arthropoda
- Class: Insecta
- Order: Coleoptera
- Suborder: Adephaga
- Family: Carabidae
- Subfamily: Panagaeinae
- Tribe: Panagaeini
- Subtribe: Panagaeina
- Genus: Cintaroa; Kasahara, 1989

Genus of beetles

Cintaroa is a genus in the beetle family Carabidae. There are at least two described species in Cintaroa.

== Species ==
These two species belong to the genus Cintaroa:

- Cintaroa aptera Kasahara, 1989 (Taiwan)
- Cintaroa sikkimica Häckel & Sciaky, 2019 (India)
