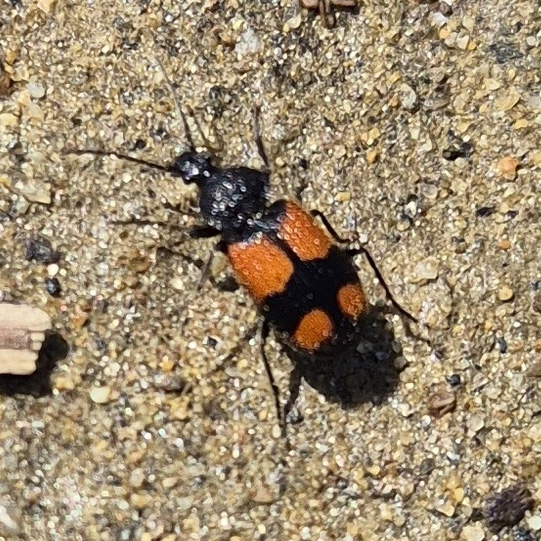

Scientific classification
- Kingdom: Animalia
- Phylum: Arthropoda
- Clade: Pancrustacea
- Class: Insecta
- Order: Coleoptera
- Suborder: Adephaga
- Family: Carabidae
- Genus: Panagaeus
- Species: P. robustus

Binomial name
- Panagaeus robustus A. Morawitz, 1862

= Panagaeus robustus =

Species of beetle

Panagaeus robustus is a species of ground beetle in the Panagaeinae subfamily that can be found in Japan, South Korea, and Maritime province of Russia. In Japan, the species was found in Ezo, Junsai, Sapporo, and Shiraoi provinces.
