= Ardistomopsis =

Scientific classification
- Domain: Eukaryota
- Kingdom: Animalia
- Phylum: Arthropoda
- Class: Insecta
- Order: Coleoptera
- Suborder: Adephaga
- Family: Carabidae
- Subfamily: Panagaeinae
- Tribe: Peleciini
- Subtribe: Peleciina
- Genus: Ardistomopsis; Straneo & Ball, 1989

Genus of beetles

Ardistomopsis is a genus in the beetle family Carabidae. There are about five described species in Ardistomopsis.

== Species ==
These five species belong to the genus Ardistomopsis:

- Ardistomopsis andrewesi Straneo & Ball, 1989 (India)
- Ardistomopsis batesi Straneo & Ball, 1989 (India)
- Ardistomopsis marginicollis (Schaum, 1864) (India)
- Ardistomopsis myrmex (Andrewes, 1923) (Sri Lanka and India)
- Ardistomopsis ovicollis (Bates, 1886) (Sri Lanka)
