= Geobius =

Scientific classification
- Kingdom: Animalia
- Phylum: Arthropoda
- Class: Insecta
- Order: Coleoptera
- Suborder: Adephaga
- Family: Carabidae
- Subfamily: Panagaeinae
- Tribe: Panagaeini
- Subtribe: Panagaeina
- Genus: Geobius; Dejean, 1831
- Species: G. pubescens

Binomial name
- Geobius pubescens Dejean, 1831

Synonyms
- Philogeus Blanchard, 1840

Genus of beetles

Geobius is a genus in the ground beetle family Carabidae. This genus has a single species, Geobius pubescens, found in Argentina.
