= Pseudagonica =

Scientific classification
- Domain: Eukaryota
- Kingdom: Animalia
- Phylum: Arthropoda
- Class: Insecta
- Order: Coleoptera
- Suborder: Adephaga
- Family: Carabidae
- Subfamily: Panagaeinae
- Tribe: Peleciini
- Subtribe: Agonicina
- Genus: Pseudagonica; B.Moore, 1960

Genus of beetles

Pseudagonica is a genus in the beetle family Carabidae. There are about 13 described species in Pseudagonica, found in Australia.

== Species ==
These 13 species belong to the genus Pseudagonica:

- Pseudagonica aberrans Baehr, 2012
- Pseudagonica alpina Baehr, 2012
- Pseudagonica amblyops Baehr, 2012
- Pseudagonica incerta Baehr, 2012
- Pseudagonica latibasis Baehr, 2012
- Pseudagonica longipennis Baehr, 2012
- Pseudagonica macrops Baehr, 2012
- Pseudagonica minuta Baehr, 2012
- Pseudagonica montisfusci Baehr, 2012
- Pseudagonica nitida B.Moore, 1960
- Pseudagonica obscuripes Baehr, 2012
- Pseudagonica orbitalis Baehr, 2012
- Pseudagonica spinosa Baehr, 2012
