= Panagaeus japonicus =

Scientific classification
- Domain: Eukaryota
- Kingdom: Animalia
- Phylum: Arthropoda
- Class: Insecta
- Order: Coleoptera
- Suborder: Adephaga
- Family: Carabidae
- Genus: Panagaeus
- Species: P. japonicus

Binomial name
- Panagaeus japonicus (Chaudoir, 1861)

Synonyms
- Panagaeus rubripes Morawitz, 1862; Craspedophorus japonicus Jedlička, 1962

Species of beetle

Panagaeus japonicus is a species of ground beetle in the Panagaeinae subfamily that can be found in Japan, North Korea and Maritime province of Russia. It is also known from various provinces of China such as Heilongjiang, Hubei, Jilin, and Shanxi. The species is black coloured with red spots on its wings.

== Habitat and further distribution ==
=== China ===
In China, the species were recorded from its capital of Beijing in 1887.

=== Japan ===
In Japan, the species can be found in Hakone, Miyanoshita and as far as Sapporo. They prefer various moss and rotten stumps or trees where they are abundant. The species were also found in the city Hakodate of Hokkaido.

== Description ==
The species is 13 millimetres (0.51 in) in length.
