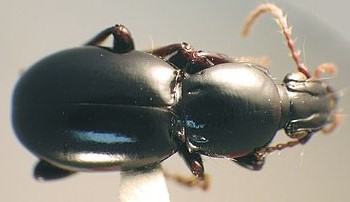
- Eripus oaxacanus

Scientific classification
- Kingdom: Animalia
- Phylum: Arthropoda
- Class: Insecta
- Order: Coleoptera
- Suborder: Adephaga
- Family: Carabidae
- Subfamily: Panagaeinae
- Tribe: Peleciini
- Subtribe: Peleciina
- Genus: Eripus; Dejean, 1829

Subgenera
- Eripidius Straneo & Ball, 1989; Eripus Dejean, 1829

= Eripus =

Genus of beetles

Eripus is a genus in the beetle family Carabidae. There are about 12 described species in Eripus.

== Species ==
These 12 species belong to the genus Eripus:

- Eripus andersoni Ball & Shpeley, 2009 (Honduras)
- Eripus balli Sokolov, 2019
- Eripus breedlovei Straneo & Ball, 1989 (Guatemala and Mexico)
- Eripus franzi Straneo & Ball, 1989 (Peru)
- Eripus globipennis (Chaudoir, 1866) (Mexico)
- Eripus microphthalmus (Chaudoir, 1866) (Mexico)
- Eripus microps Ball & Shpeley, 2009
- Eripus nitidus (Chaudoir, 1861) (Mexico)
- Eripus oaxacanus Straneo & Ball, 1989 (Mexico)
- Eripus scydmaenoides Dejean, 1829 (Mexico)
- Eripus subcoecus (Chaudoir, 1866) (Mexico)
- Eripus suturalis (Chaudoir, 1861) (Guatemala and Mexico)
