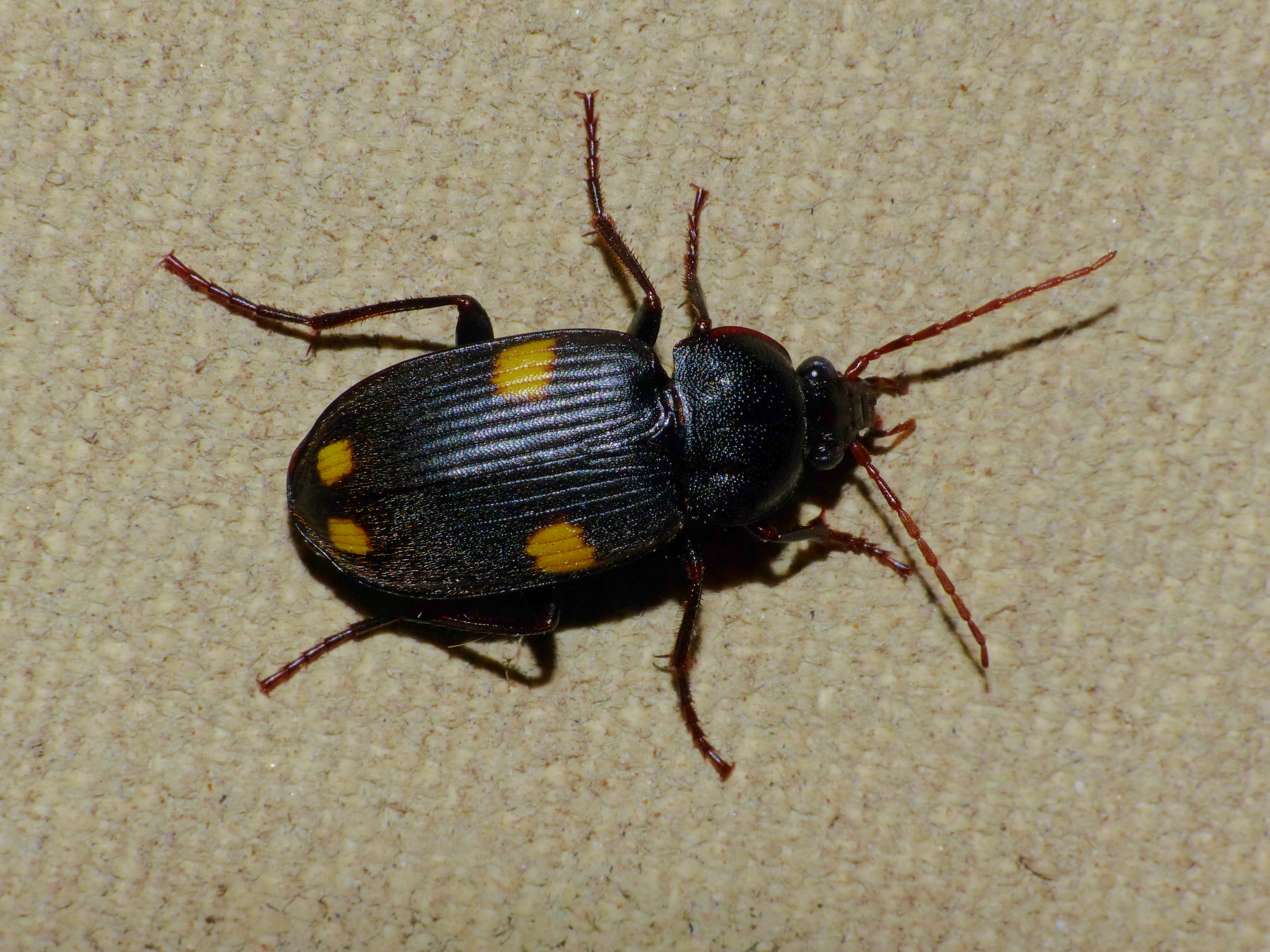

Scientific classification
- Kingdom: Animalia
- Phylum: Arthropoda
- Class: Insecta
- Order: Coleoptera
- Suborder: Adephaga
- Family: Carabidae
- Subfamily: Panagaeinae
- Tribe: Panagaeini
- Subtribe: Panagaeina
- Genus: Epigraphus; Chaudoir, 1869

= Epigraphus =

Genus of beetles

Epigraphus is a genus in the ground beetle family Carabidae. There are about seven described species in Epigraphus, found in Africa.

== Species ==
These seven species belong to the genus Epigraphus:

- Epigraphus adoxus Basilewsky, 1967 (Mozambique, Zimbabwe)
- Epigraphus amplicollis (Schaum, 1854) (DR Congo, Mozambique, South Africa)
- Epigraphus arcuatocollis (Murray, 1857) (Africa)
- Epigraphus congonicus Basilewsky, 1967 (DR Congo, Burundi)
- Epigraphus differens Basilewsky, 1967 (Equatorial Guinea, Gabon)
- Epigraphus fuscicornis (Kolbe, 1883) (Africa)
- Epigraphus insolitus Bates, 1886 (Guinea, Togo, Cameroon, DR Congo)
