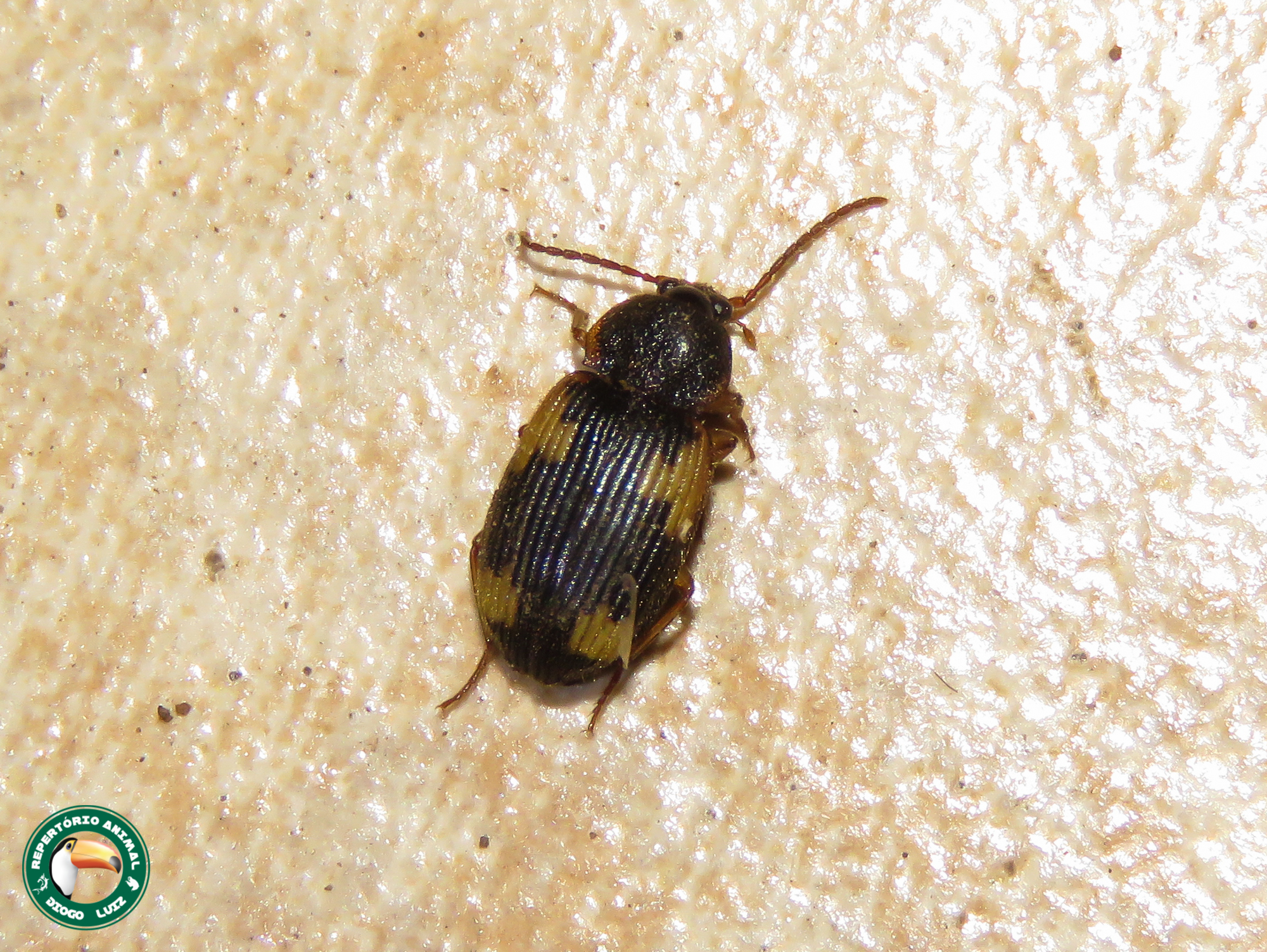
- Microschemus, Tanzania

Scientific classification
- Domain: Eukaryota
- Kingdom: Animalia
- Phylum: Arthropoda
- Class: Insecta
- Order: Coleoptera
- Suborder: Adephaga
- Family: Carabidae
- Subfamily: Panagaeinae
- Tribe: Panagaeini
- Subtribe: Panagaeina
- Genus: Microschemus; Andrewes, 1940

Synonyms
- Microcosmodes E.Strand, 1936

= Microschemus =

Genus of beetle

Microschemus is a genus of in the beetle family Carabidae. There are more than 20 described species in Microschemus found in Africa and southern Asia.

== Species ==
These 29 species belong to the genus Microschemus:

- Microschemus amabilis (Dejean, 1831) (Africa)
- Microschemus angolensis (Chaudoir, 1879) (Congo (Brazzaville) and Angola)
- Microschemus arabicus (Häckel & Azadbakhsh) (Saudi Arabia, Oman, and Yemen)
- Microschemus barkeri (Fedorenko, 2015) (South Africa)
- Microschemus chaudoiri (Raffray, 1886) (Eritrea and Somalia)
- Microschemus cheranganensis (Burgeon, 1936) (Kenya)
- Microschemus cruciatus (Dejean, 1831) (Senegal/ Gambia, Ivory Coast, and Chad)
- Microschemus diversopictus (Basilewsky, 1949) (Mozambique)
- Microschemus elegans (Dejean, 1826) (Pakistan, Nepal, Bangladesh, Sri Lanka, and India)
- Microschemus flavopilosus (LaFerté-Sénectère, 1851) (South and Southeast Asia)
- Microschemus grandis Basilewsky, 1946 (Senegal/ Gambia, Burkina Faso, and Benin)
- Microschemus laetiusculus (Chaudoir, 1879) (Mozambique, Zimbabwe, Botswana, and South Africa)
- Microschemus laetus (Dejean, 1831) (Africa)
- Microschemus laticornis (Kirschenhofer, 2000) (Myanmar and Thailand)
- Microschemus luebberti (Kuntzen, 1919) (Namibia)
- Microschemus marakwetianus (Burgeon, 1936) (Kenya)
- Microschemus natalensis (Péringuey, 1896) (South Africa)
- Microschemus notabilis (Xie & Yu, 1991) (China)
- Microschemus pallipes (Fedorenko, 2015) (Vietnam)
- Microschemus perrieri Jeannel, 1949 (Madagascar)
- Microschemus persicus (Häckel & Azadbakhsh) (Iran)
- Microschemus pierronii (Fairmaire, 1880) (Madagascar)
- Microschemus planicollis (Chaudoir, 1876) (Eritrea)
- Microschemus quadrinotulatus (Motschulsky, 1864) (South Africa)
- Microschemus symei (Murray, 1857) (Africa)
- Microschemus tenuipunctatus (LaFerté-Sénectère, 1851) (South Africa)
- Microschemus vadoni Jeannel, 1949 (Madagascar)
- Microschemus vicinus (Murray, 1857) (Africa)
- Microschemus villosulus (Chaudoir, 1879) (Africa)
