= Stricteripus =

Scientific classification
- Domain: Eukaryota
- Kingdom: Animalia
- Phylum: Arthropoda
- Class: Insecta
- Order: Coleoptera
- Suborder: Adephaga
- Family: Carabidae
- Subfamily: Panagaeinae
- Tribe: Peleciini
- Subtribe: Peleciina
- Genus: Stricteripus; Straneo & Ball, 1989

Genus of beetles

Stricteripus is a genus of beetles in the family Carabidae, containing the following species:

== Species ==
These four species belong to the genus Stricteripus:

- Stricteripus baenningeri (Straneo, 1953) (Venezuela)
- Stricteripus hoffmani Ball & Shpeley, 2009
- Stricteripus impressus (Straneo, 1955) (Bolivia)
- Stricteripus peruvianus (Straneo, 1955) (Peru)
