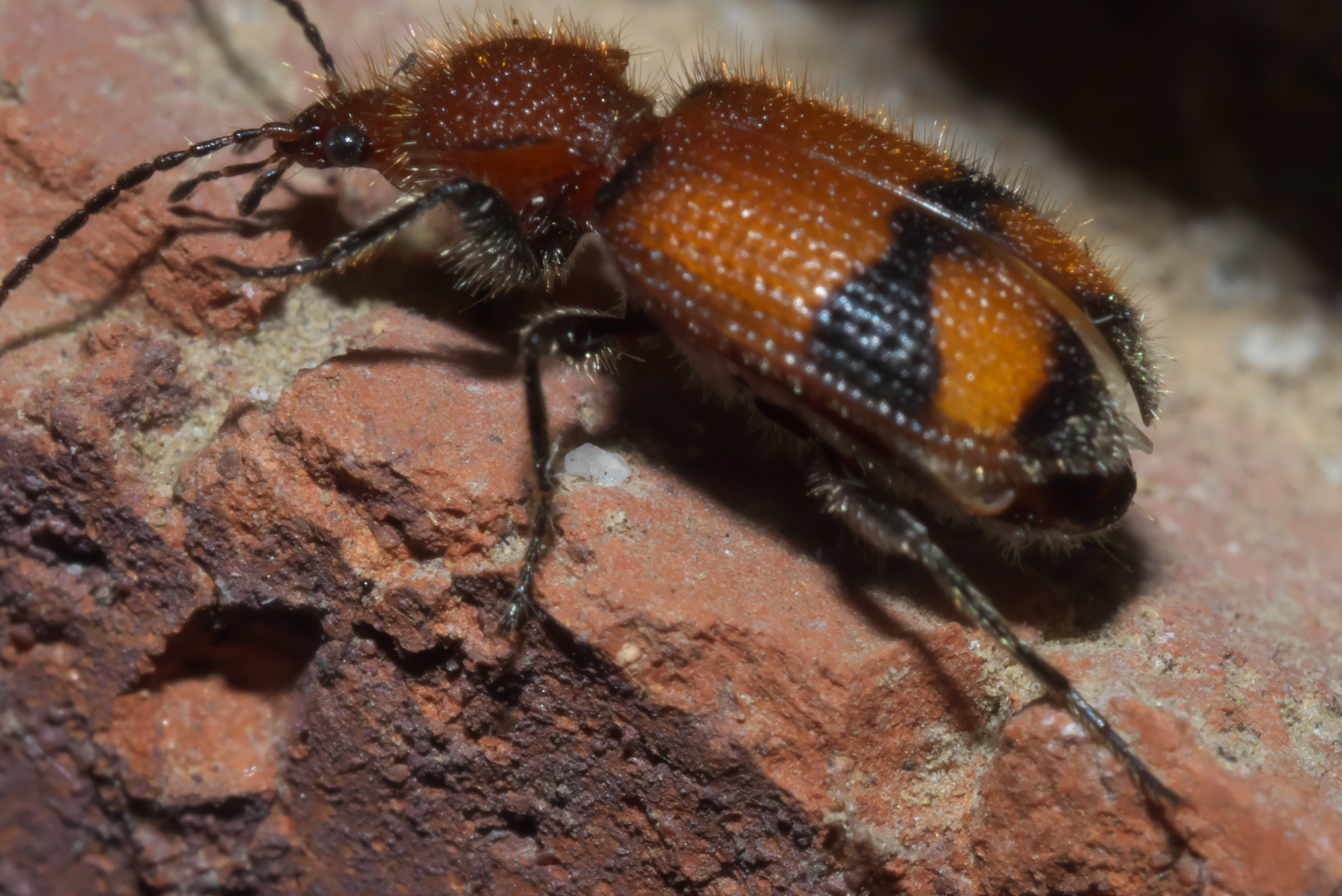
- Panagaeus fasciatus

Scientific classification
- Kingdom: Animalia
- Phylum: Arthropoda
- Class: Insecta
- Order: Coleoptera
- Suborder: Adephaga
- Family: Carabidae
- Subfamily: Panagaeinae
- Tribe: Panagaeini
- Genus: Panagaeus; Latreille, 1802

Subgenera
- Hologaeus Ogueta, 1966; Panagaeus Latreille, 1802

= Panagaeus =

Genus of beetles

Panagaeus is a genus in the beetle family Carabidae, native to the Holarctic (including Europe), the Near East, and North Africa, as well as Central and South America. There are about 15 described species in Panagaeus.

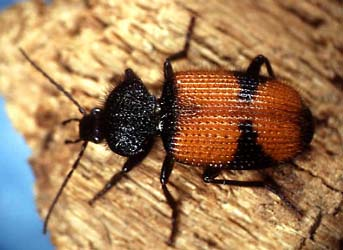
Panagaeus sallei

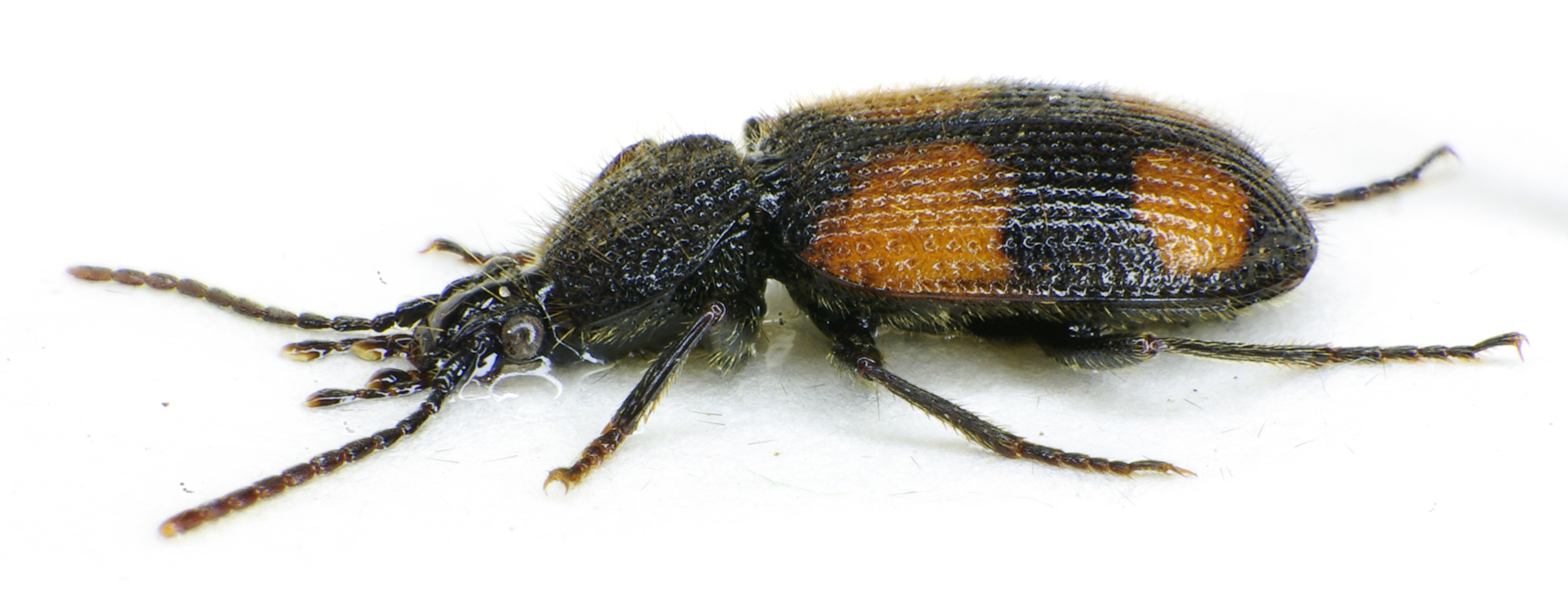
Panagaeus bipustulatus

== Species ==
These 15 species belong to the genus Panagaeus:

- Panagaeus abei Nakane, 1997 (Japan)
- Panagaeus asuai Ogueta, 1966 (Hispaniola)
- Panagaeus bipustulatus (Fabricius, 1775) (Palearctic)
- Panagaeus coreanus Nakane, 1997 (North Korea and South Korea)
- Panagaeus cruciger Say, 1823 (United States)
- Panagaeus cruxmajor (Linnaeus, 1758) (Palearctic)
- Panagaeus davidi Fairmaire, 1887 (China and North Korea)
- Panagaeus fasciatus Say, 1823 (United States and Canada)
- Panagaeus japonicus Chaudoir, 1862 (China, North Korea, South Korea, Japan, and Russia)
- Panagaeus panamensis LaFerté-Sénectère, 1851 (Ecuador and Panama)
- Panagaeus quadrisignatus Chevrolat, 1835 (Mexico)
- Panagaeus relictus Semenov & Bogachev, 1938 (Uzbekistan, Turkmenistan, Kyrgyzstan, Tadzhikistan, and China)
- Panagaeus robustus A.Morawitz, 1862 (North Korea, Japan, and Russia)
- Panagaeus sallei Chaudoir, 1862 (United States and Mexico)
- † Panagaeus dryadum Oustalet, 1874
