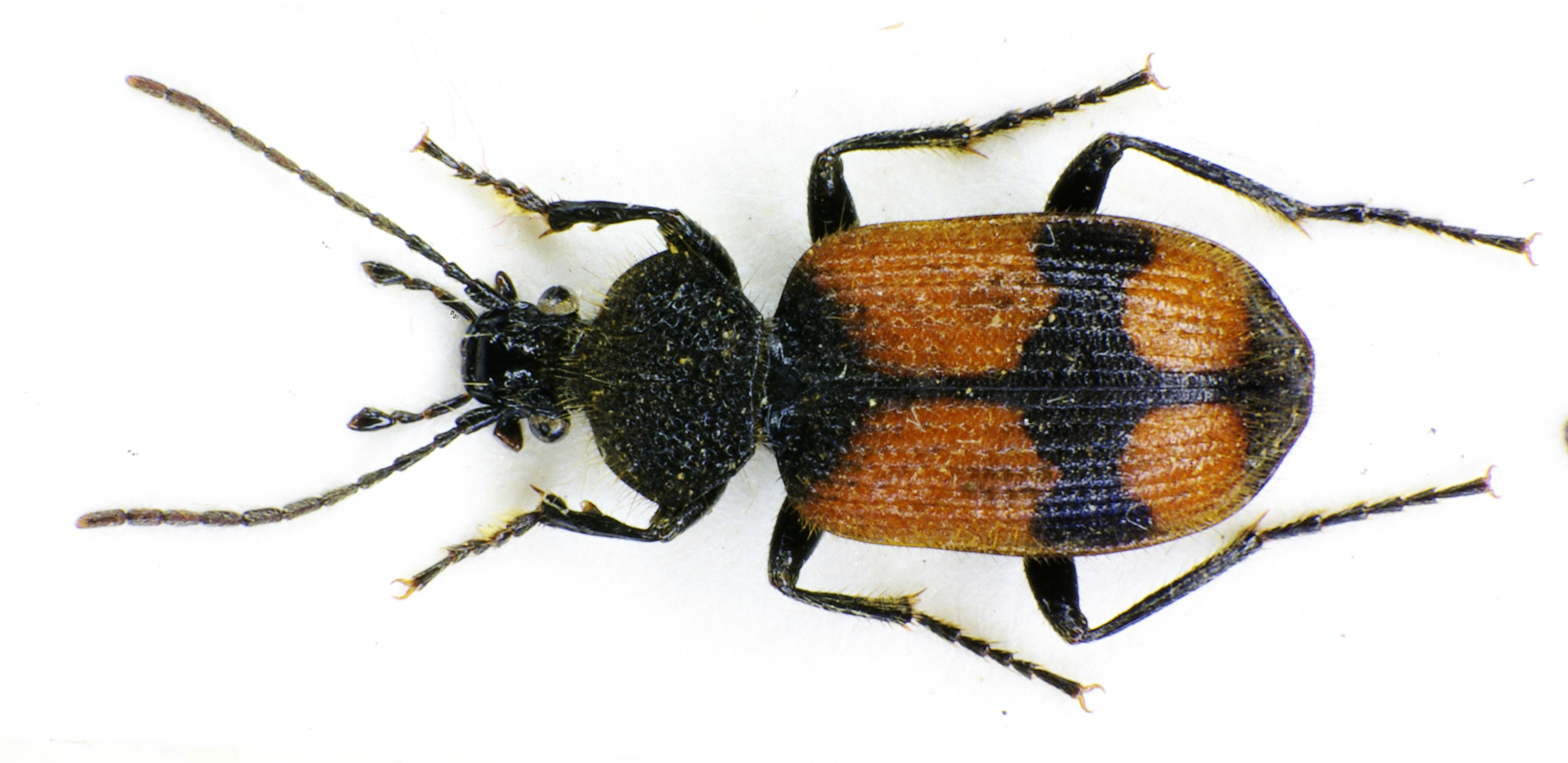

Scientific classification
- Kingdom: Animalia
- Phylum: Arthropoda
- Clade: Pancrustacea
- Class: Insecta
- Order: Coleoptera
- Suborder: Adephaga
- Family: Carabidae
- Genus: Panagaeus
- Species: P. cruxmajor

Binomial name
- Panagaeus cruxmajor (Linnaeus, 1758)

= Panagaeus cruxmajor =

Species of beetle

Panagaeus cruxmajor, the crucifix ground beetle, is a rare European ground beetle. In England it occurs in a few places only. Panagaeus bipustulatus is a more common relative, looking very much alike except for having a distinct male genital structure, being smaller, having a round thorax and the first antennomere being shorter and stouter, In some parts of Europe, P. bipustulatus is rarer, with P. cruxmajor being the more common species. The crucifix ground beetle has sometimes been included in P. bipustulatus, but most modern authors consider it a distinct species.

The largely black and rather bristly beetle is 8–10 millimetres (0.31–0.39 in) in length, with large red spots on its wing cases which give the appearance of a red background behind a black cross. It shelters under pieces of wood during the day, and is a nocturnal predatory species thought to mainly feed on semi-aquatic snails.

It was greatly treasured by 19th century collectors, and Charles Darwin recounted an incident when he was an undergraduate at the University of Cambridge around 1828. He had already collected two ground beetles when he "saw a sacred Panagæus crux major". He tried putting one of the other beetles in his mouth to free his hand, but it ejected acrid fluid down his throat, causing him to spit it out and lose all three.
