= Disphericus =

Scientific classification
- Domain: Eukaryota
- Kingdom: Animalia
- Phylum: Arthropoda
- Class: Insecta
- Order: Coleoptera
- Suborder: Adephaga
- Family: Carabidae
- Subfamily: Panagaeinae
- Tribe: Peleciini
- Subtribe: Peleciina
- Genus: Disphericus; G.R.Waterhouse, 1842

Synonyms
- Disphaericus Agassiz, 1846

Genus of beetles

Disphericus is a genus in the ground beetle family Carabidae. There are about 18 described species in Disphericus, found in Africa.

== Species ==
These 18 species belong to the genus Disphericus:

- Disphericus alluaudi Basilewsky, 1938 (Tanzania)
- Disphericus benadirensis G.Müller, 1941 (Somalia)
- Disphericus carinulatus Basilewsky, 1955 (Tanzania)
- Disphericus clavicornis Kolbe, 1895 (DR Congo)
- Disphericus conradti Kolbe, 1895 (DR Congo, Tanzania)
- Disphericus deplanatus G.Müller, 1949 (Kenya)
- Disphericus gambianus G.R.Waterhouse, 1842 (Africa)
- Disphericus insulanus Basilewsky, 1955 (Equatorial Guinea)
- Disphericus katangensis Burgeon, 1935 (DR Congo)
- Disphericus kolbei Alluaud, 1914 (Kenya)
- Disphericus meneghettii G.Müller, 1949 (Kenya)
- Disphericus multiporus Bates, 1886 (Cameroon, Gabon, Congo)
- Disphericus quangoanus Quedenfeldt, 1883 (Congo, DR Congo, Angola)
- Disphericus rhodesianus Péringuey, 1904 (DR and South Africa)
- Disphericus silvestrii G.Müller, 1949 (Cameroon)
- Disphericus sulcostriatus Fairmaire, 1887 (DR, Tanzania, Zambia)
- Disphericus tarsalis Bates, 1886 (Angola)
- Disphericus zavattarii G.Müller, 1939 (Ethiopia)
