= Epigraphodes =

Scientific classification
- Domain: Eukaryota
- Kingdom: Animalia
- Phylum: Arthropoda
- Class: Insecta
- Order: Coleoptera
- Suborder: Adephaga
- Family: Carabidae
- Subfamily: Panagaeinae
- Tribe: Panagaeini
- Subtribe: Panagaeina
- Genus: Epigraphodes; Basilewsky, 1967

Genus of beetles

Epigraphodes is a genus in the beetle family Carabidae. There are at least three described species in Epigraphodes, found in Africa.

== Species ==
These three species belong to the genus Epigraphodes:

- Epigraphodes congoensis (Burgeon, 1935) (Democratic Republic of the Congo, Burundi, and Zambia)
- Epigraphodes kivuensis (Basilewsky, 1955) (Democratic Republic of the Congo)
- Epigraphodes uluguruanus (Basilewsky, 1962) (Tanzania)
