= Dyschiridium =

Scientific classification
- Kingdom: Animalia
- Phylum: Arthropoda
- Class: Insecta
- Order: Coleoptera
- Suborder: Adephaga
- Family: Carabidae
- Subfamily: Panagaeinae
- Tribe: Peleciini
- Subtribe: Peleciina
- Genus: Dyschiridium; Chaudoir, 1861

Genus of beetles

Dyschiridium is a genus in the beetle family Carabidae. There are about five described species in Dyschiridium.

== Species ==
These five species belong to the genus Dyschiridium:

- Dyschiridium belovi Fedorenko (Vietnam)
- Dyschiridium concinnum (Péringuey, 1926) (South Africa)
- Dyschiridium ebeninum Chaudoir, 1861 (Democratic Republic of the Congo, Rwanda, and South Africa)
- Dyschiridium lastii (Bates, 1886) (Democratic Republic of the Congo)
- Dyschiridium subdepressum (Kolbe, 1895)
