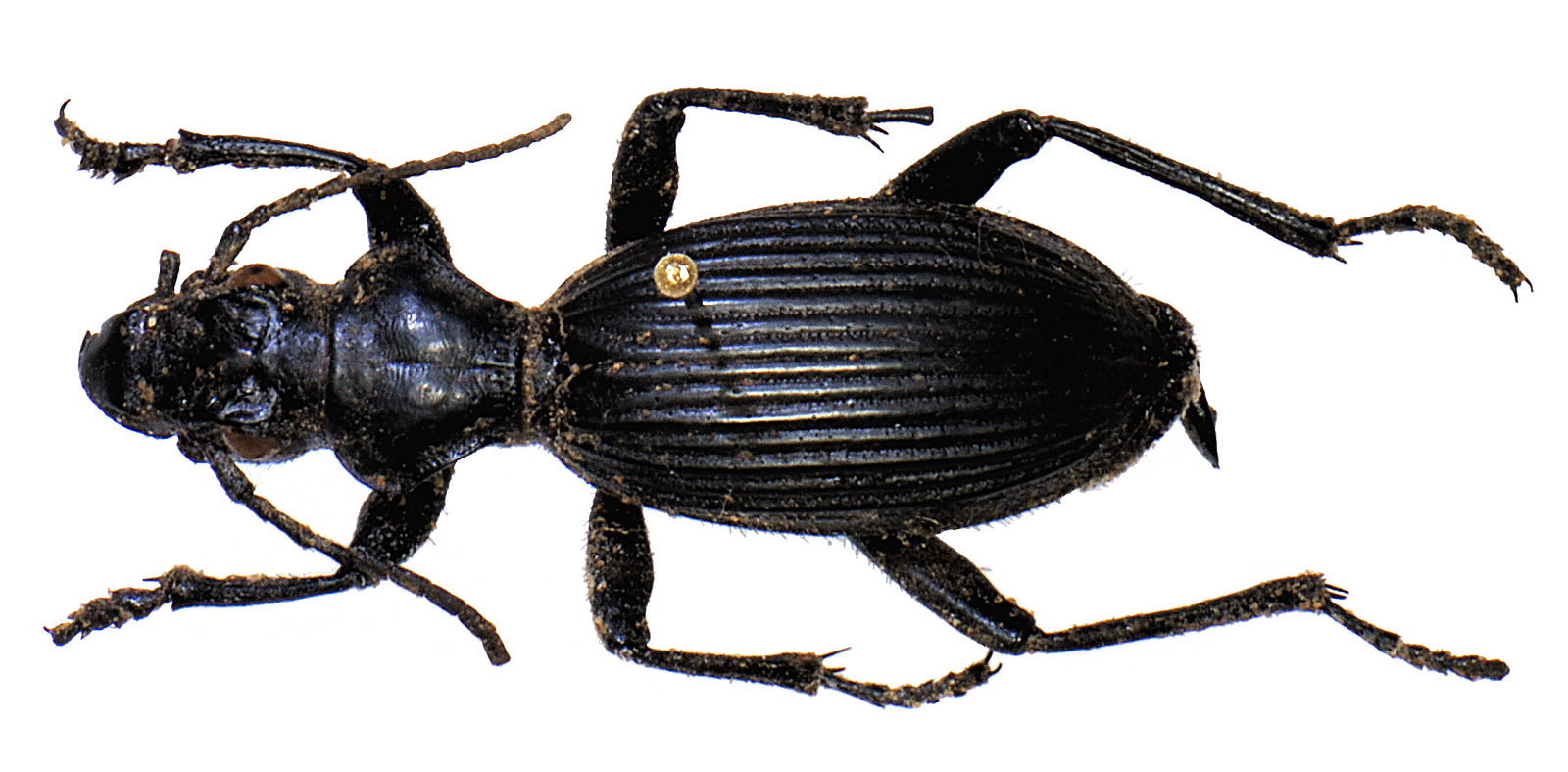
- Tefflus zebulianus

Scientific classification
- Domain: Eukaryota
- Kingdom: Animalia
- Phylum: Arthropoda
- Class: Insecta
- Order: Coleoptera
- Suborder: Adephaga
- Family: Carabidae
- Subfamily: Panagaeinae
- Tribe: Panagaeini
- Subtribe: Panagaeina
- Genus: Tefflus; Leach, 1819

= Tefflus =

Genus of beetles

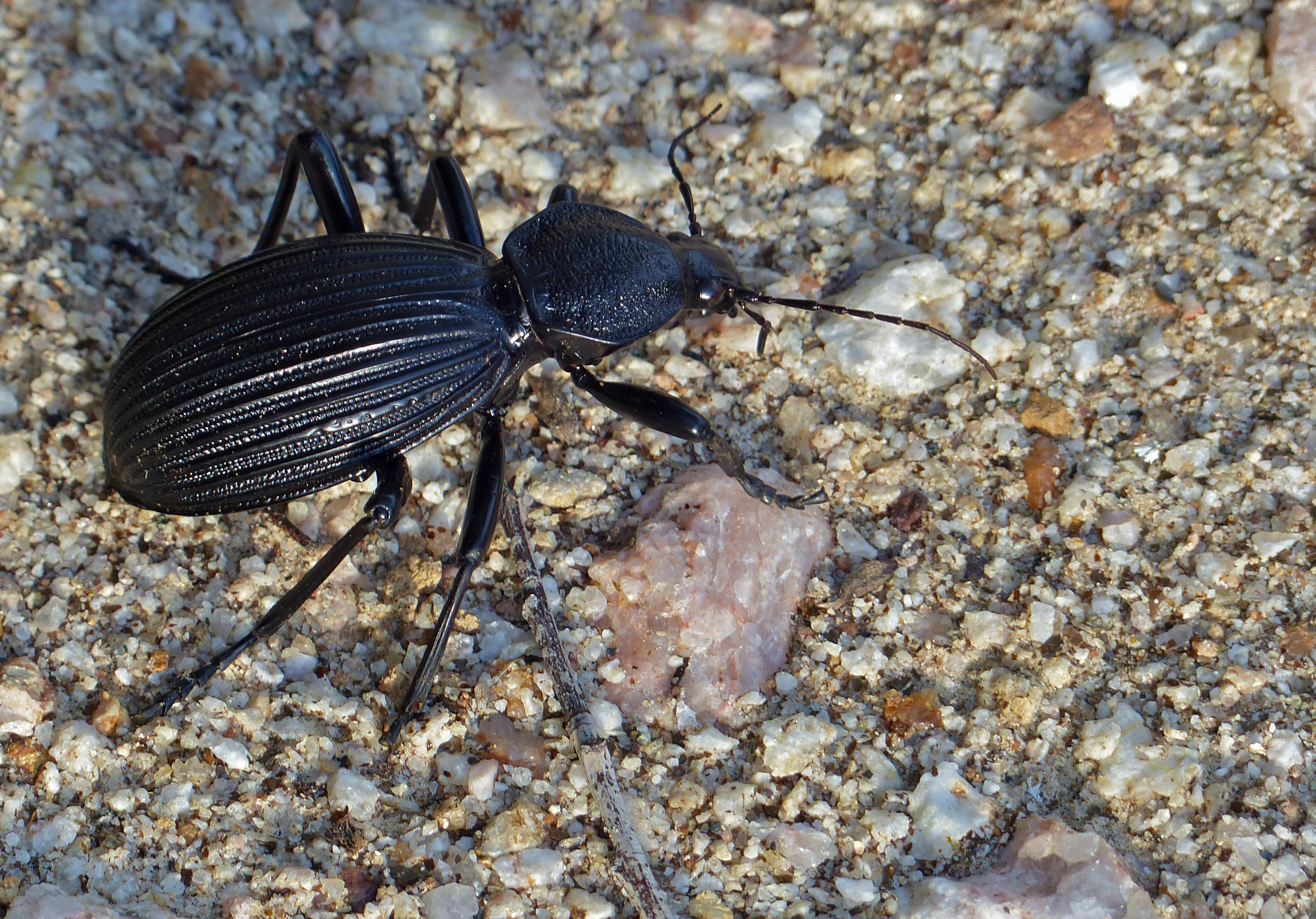
Tefflus meyerlei

Tefflus is a genus of large, black and flightless Afrotropical ground beetles in the tribe Panagaeini. They are broadly similar to the Anthiini ('oogpisters'), but are not colourful, and have a six-sided and flattish pronotum. The distinct longitudinal carinae (ridges) on their elytra are separated by two rows of punctures running along the striae (grooves). Males have some segments of the forelegs enlarged.

They are solitary and mostly nocturnal hunters, that move about at a brisk pace. They have strong mandibles that can inflict a serious bite, and prey on a variety of invertebrates. The last revision of the genus was undertaken in 1946.

== Species ==
Some 14 to 15 species are native to the Afrotropics:

- Tefflus angustipes Kolbe, 1903
- Tefflus brevicostatus Quedenfeldt, 1883 – Tanzania
- Tefflus camerunus Kolbe, 1903
- Tefflus carinatus Klug, 1853 – Malawi, South Africa (length: c.26–37 mm)
- Tefflus hamiltonii Bates, 1871 – Angola
- Tefflus juvenilis Gerstaecker, 1871 – Somalia, Kenya, Tanzania
- Tefflus kilimanus Kolbe, 1897 – Tanzania
- Tefflus meyerlei (Fabricius, 1801) – South Africa (length: c.39–54 mm)
- Tefflus muata Harold, 1878
- Tefflus purpureipennis Quedenfeldt, 1883
- Tefflus raffrayi Chaudoir, 1874
- Tefflus tenuicollis Fairmaire, 1894
- Tefflus viridanus Kolbe, 1897 – Tanzania
- Tefflus zanzibaricus Kolbe, 1886
- Tefflus zebulianus Raffray, 1882
