= Agonica =

Scientific classification
- Kingdom: Animalia
- Phylum: Arthropoda
- Clade: Pancrustacea
- Class: Insecta
- Order: Coleoptera
- Suborder: Adephaga
- Family: Carabidae
- Subfamily: Panagaeinae
- Tribe: Peleciini
- Subtribe: Agonicina
- Genus: Agonica; Sloane, 1920

Genus of beetles

Agonica is a genus in the beetle family Carabidae. There are at least four described species in Agonica, found in Australia.

== Species ==
These four species belong to the genus Agonica:

- Agonica ovalipennis Sloane, 1920
- Agonica simsoni Sloane, 1920
- Agonica sloanei Baehr, 2012
- Agonica victoriensis B.Moore, 1963
