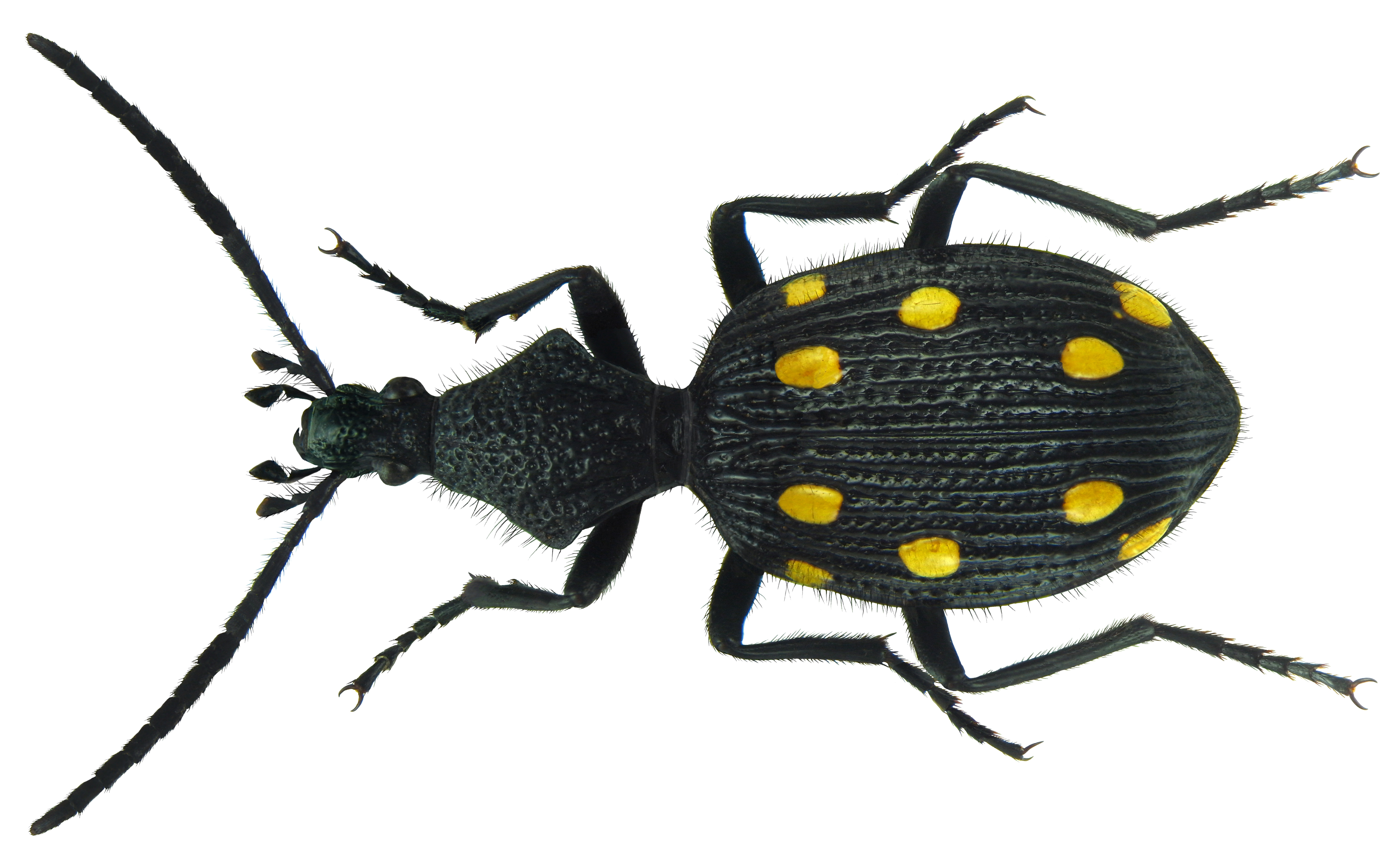
- Psecadius eustalactus

Scientific classification
- Domain: Eukaryota
- Kingdom: Animalia
- Phylum: Arthropoda
- Class: Insecta
- Order: Coleoptera
- Suborder: Adephaga
- Family: Carabidae
- Subfamily: Panagaeinae
- Tribe: Panagaeini
- Subtribe: Panagaeina
- Genus: Psecadius; Alluaud, 1911

= Psecadius =

Genus of beetles

Psecadius is a genus in the beetle family Carabidae. There are at least four described species in Psecadius.

== Species ==
These four species belong to the genus Psecadius:

- Psecadius alluaudi (Vuillet, 1911) (Mozambique)
- Psecadius eustalactus (Gerstaecker, 1867) (Somalia, Democratic Republic of the Congo, Kenya, and Tanzania)
- Psecadius eximius (Sommer, 1852) (Kenya, Tanzania, and Mozambique)
- Psecadius oberthurii (Gestro, 1895) (Malawi)
