= Bascanus =

Scientific classification
- Kingdom: Animalia
- Phylum: Arthropoda
- Class: Insecta
- Order: Coleoptera
- Suborder: Adephaga
- Family: Carabidae
- Subfamily: Panagaeinae
- Tribe: Panagaeini
- Subtribe: Bascanina
- Genus: Bascanus; Péringuey, 1896

Genus of beetles

Bascanus is a genus in the beetle family Carabidae. There are about 10 described species in Bascanus.

== Species ==
These 10 species belong to the genus Bascanus:

- Bascanus andreaei Basilewsky, 1961 (South Africa)
- Bascanus claeysbouuaerti Basilewsky, 1953 (Rwanda and Burundi)
- Bascanus dissidens Péringuey, 1908 (Zimbabwe)
- Bascanus fortesculptus Basilewsky, 1961 (Democratic Republic of the Congo, Zimbabwe)
- Bascanus gracilis Péringuey, 1896 (South Africa)
- Bascanus leleupi Basilewsky, 1961 (Democratic Republic of the Congo)
- Bascanus longicollis Péringuey, 1896 (South Africa)
- Bascanus natalicus Basilewsky, 1961 (South Africa)
- Bascanus transvaalensis Basilewsky, 1961 (South Africa)
- Bascanus vandenberghei Basilewsky, 1953 (Democratic Republic of the Congo, Uganda, and Burundi)
