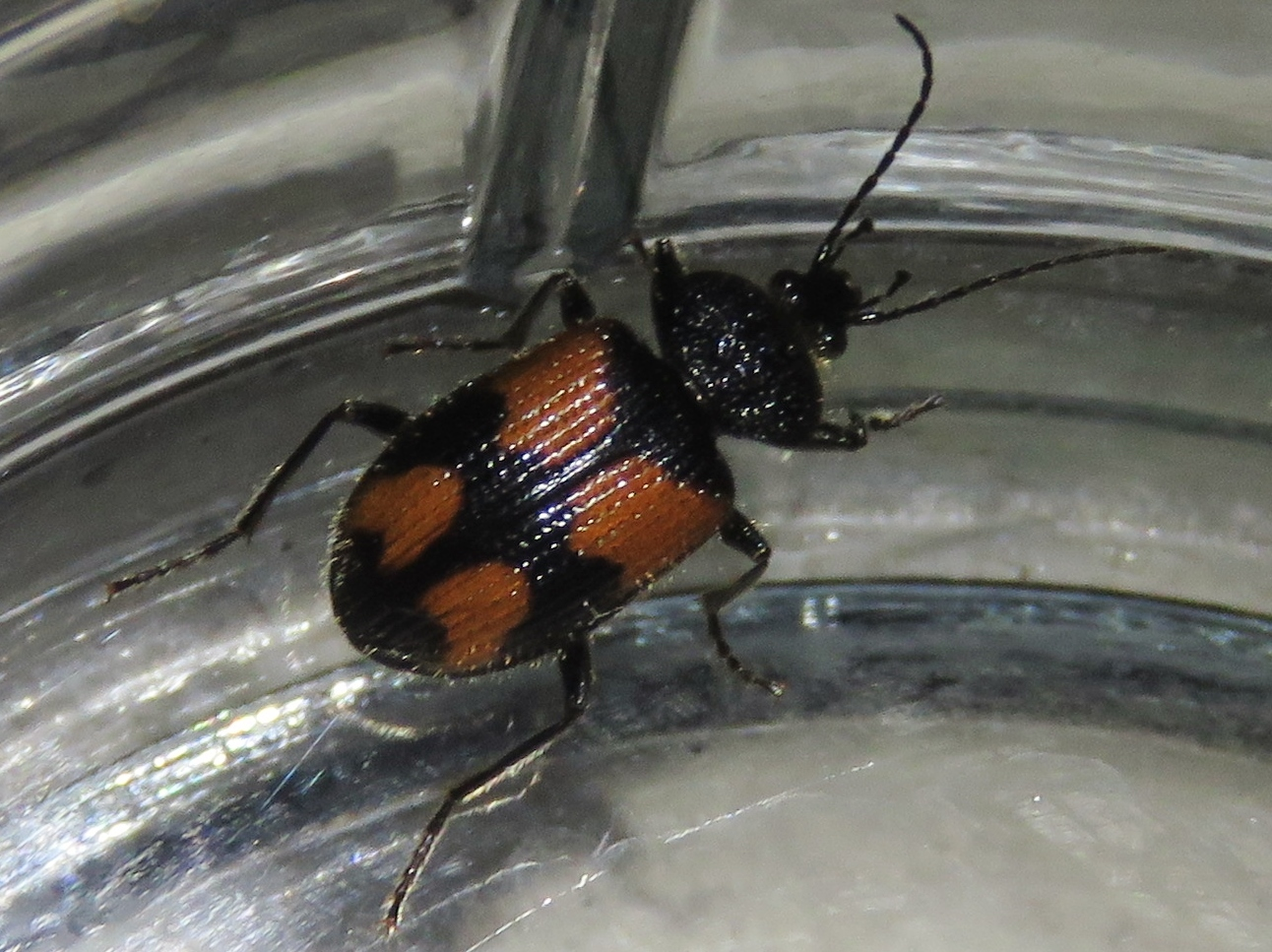

Scientific classification
- Domain: Eukaryota
- Kingdom: Animalia
- Phylum: Arthropoda
- Class: Insecta
- Order: Coleoptera
- Suborder: Adephaga
- Family: Carabidae
- Genus: Panagaeus
- Species: P. quadrisignatus

Binomial name
- Panagaeus quadrisignatus Chavrolat, 1835

Synonyms
- Panagaeus mexicanus Putzeys, 1846; Panagaeus thomae Schaum, 1854

= Panagaeus quadrisignatus =

Species of beetle

Panagaeus quadrisignatus is a species of ground beetle in the subfamily Panagaeinae. It is endemic to Mexico.
