= Coptia =

Scientific classification
- Domain: Eukaryota
- Kingdom: Animalia
- Phylum: Arthropoda
- Class: Insecta
- Order: Coleoptera
- Suborder: Adephaga
- Family: Carabidae
- Subfamily: Panagaeinae
- Tribe: Panagaeini
- Subtribe: Panagaeina
- Genus: Coptia; Brullé, 1835

Genus of beetles

Coptia is a genus in the ground beetle family Carabidae. There are at least four described species in Coptia. They are found in Mexico, Central America, and South America.

== Species ==
These four species belong to the genus Coptia:

- Coptia armata (Laporte, 1832) (Mexico, Central and South America)
- Coptia effeminata Darlington, 1934 (Hispaniola, Cuba)
- Coptia marginicollis Chaudoir, 1879 (Bolivia, Argentina, Paraguay, French Guiana, Brazil)
- Coptia sauricollis Darlington, 1934 (Cuba)
