= Euschizomerus =

Scientific classification
- Kingdom: Animalia
- Phylum: Arthropoda
- Class: Insecta
- Order: Coleoptera
- Suborder: Adephaga
- Family: Carabidae
- Subfamily: Panagaeinae
- Tribe: Panagaeini
- Subtribe: Panagaeina
- Genus: Euschizomerus; Chaudoir, 1850

Genus of beetles

Euschizomerus is a genus in the beetle family Carabidae. There are about 15 described species in Euschizomerus.

== Species ==
These 15 species belong to the genus Euschizomerus:

- Euschizomerus aeneus Chaudoir, 1869 (Bangladesh and Myanmar)
- Euschizomerus buquetii Chaudoir, 1850 (Africa)
- Euschizomerus caerulans Andrewes, 1938 (China, Myanmar, and Indonesia)
- Euschizomerus denticollis (Kollar, 1836) (Indomalaya)
- Euschizomerus devagiriensis Jithmon & Sabu, 2018 (India)
- Euschizomerus elongatus Chaudoir, 1862 (South Africa)
- Euschizomerus indicus Jedlicka, 1956 (India)
- Euschizomerus junodi Péringuey, 1896 (Africa)
- Euschizomerus liebkei Jedlicka, 1932 (China, Japan, and Taiwan)
- Euschizomerus metallicus Harold, 1879 (Myanmar and Cambodia)
- Euschizomerus nobilis Xie & Yu, 1991 (China)
- Euschizomerus oberthurii Fairmaire, 1898 (Madagascar)
- Euschizomerus rufipes Heller, 1921 (Philippines)
- Euschizomerus vatovai G.Müller, 1941 (Ethiopia)
- Euschizomerus vitalisi Vuillet, 1912 (Indomalaya)
