= Paregraphus =

Scientific classification
- Domain: Eukaryota
- Kingdom: Animalia
- Phylum: Arthropoda
- Class: Insecta
- Order: Coleoptera
- Suborder: Adephaga
- Family: Carabidae
- Tribe: Panagaeini
- Subtribe: Panagaeina
- Genus: Paregraphus; Basilewsky, 1967
- Species: P. krusemani

Binomial name
- Paregraphus krusemani (Basilewsky, 1948)

Genus of beetles

Paregraphus is a genus in the ground beetle family Carabidae. This genus has a single species, Paregraphus krusemani. It is found in South Africa.
