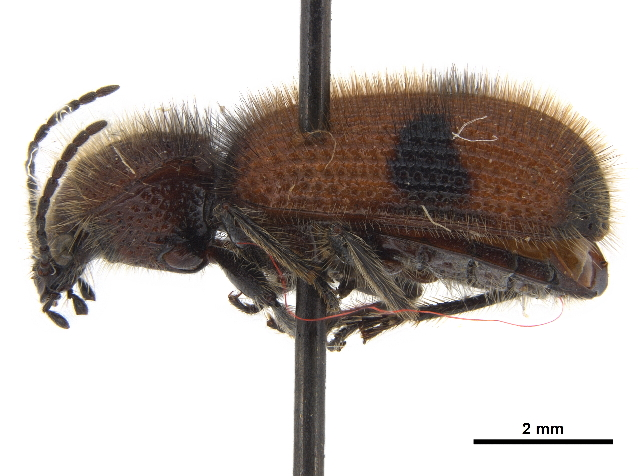

Scientific classification
- Domain: Eukaryota
- Kingdom: Animalia
- Phylum: Arthropoda
- Class: Insecta
- Order: Coleoptera
- Suborder: Adephaga
- Family: Carabidae
- Genus: Micrixys
- Species: M. distincta

Binomial name
- Micrixys distincta (Haldeman, 1852)

= Micrixys distincta =

Species of beetle

Micrixys distincta is a species of hairy ground beetle in the family Carabidae. It is found in North America.
