= Trichisia =

Scientific classification
- Kingdom: Animalia
- Phylum: Arthropoda
- Class: Insecta
- Order: Coleoptera
- Suborder: Adephaga
- Family: Carabidae
- Subfamily: Panagaeinae
- Genus: Trichisia; Motschulsky, 1865

Genus of beetles

Trichisia is a genus of beetles in the family Carabidae, containing the following species:

- Trichisia azurea (Chaudoir, 1861)
- Trichisia babaulti (Alluaud, 1914)
- Trichisia cyanea Schaum, 1854
- Trichisia insularis Schonfeldt, 1890
- Trichisia morio (Laferte-Senectere, 1851)
- Trichisia nesites Andrewes, 1931
- Trichisia papuana Csiki, 1907
- Trichisia rhodesiana Peringuey, 1908
- Trichisia violacea Jedlicka, 1935
