= Calathocosmus =

Calathocosmus mirus

Scientific classification
- Kingdom: Animalia
- Phylum: Arthropoda
- Class: Insecta
- Order: Coleoptera
- Suborder: Adephaga
- Family: Carabidae
- Subfamily: Panagaeinae
- Genus: Calathocosmus; Van Emden, 1928
- Species: C. mirus

Binomial name
- Calathocosmus mirus Van Emden, 1928

Genus of beetles

Calathocosmus mirus is a species of beetle in the family Carabidae, the only species in the genus Calathocosmus.
