= Tinoderus =

Tinoderus singularis

Scientific classification
- Kingdom: Animalia
- Phylum: Arthropoda
- Class: Insecta
- Order: Coleoptera
- Suborder: Adephaga
- Family: Carabidae
- Subfamily: Panagaeinae
- Genus: Tinoderus; Chaudoir, 1879
- Species: T. singularis

Binomial name
- Tinoderus singularis Bates, 1873

Genus of beetles

Tinoderus singularis is a species of beetle in the family Carabidae, the only species in the genus Tinoderus. It is found in China.
