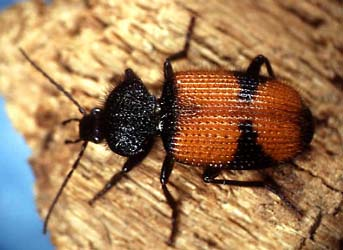

Scientific classification
- Domain: Eukaryota
- Kingdom: Animalia
- Phylum: Arthropoda
- Class: Insecta
- Order: Coleoptera
- Suborder: Adephaga
- Family: Carabidae
- Genus: Panagaeus
- Species: P. sallei

Binomial name
- Panagaeus sallei Chaudoir, 1862

= Panagaeus sallei =

Species of beetle

Panagaeus sallei is a species of hairy ground beetle in the family Carabidae. It is found in North America.
