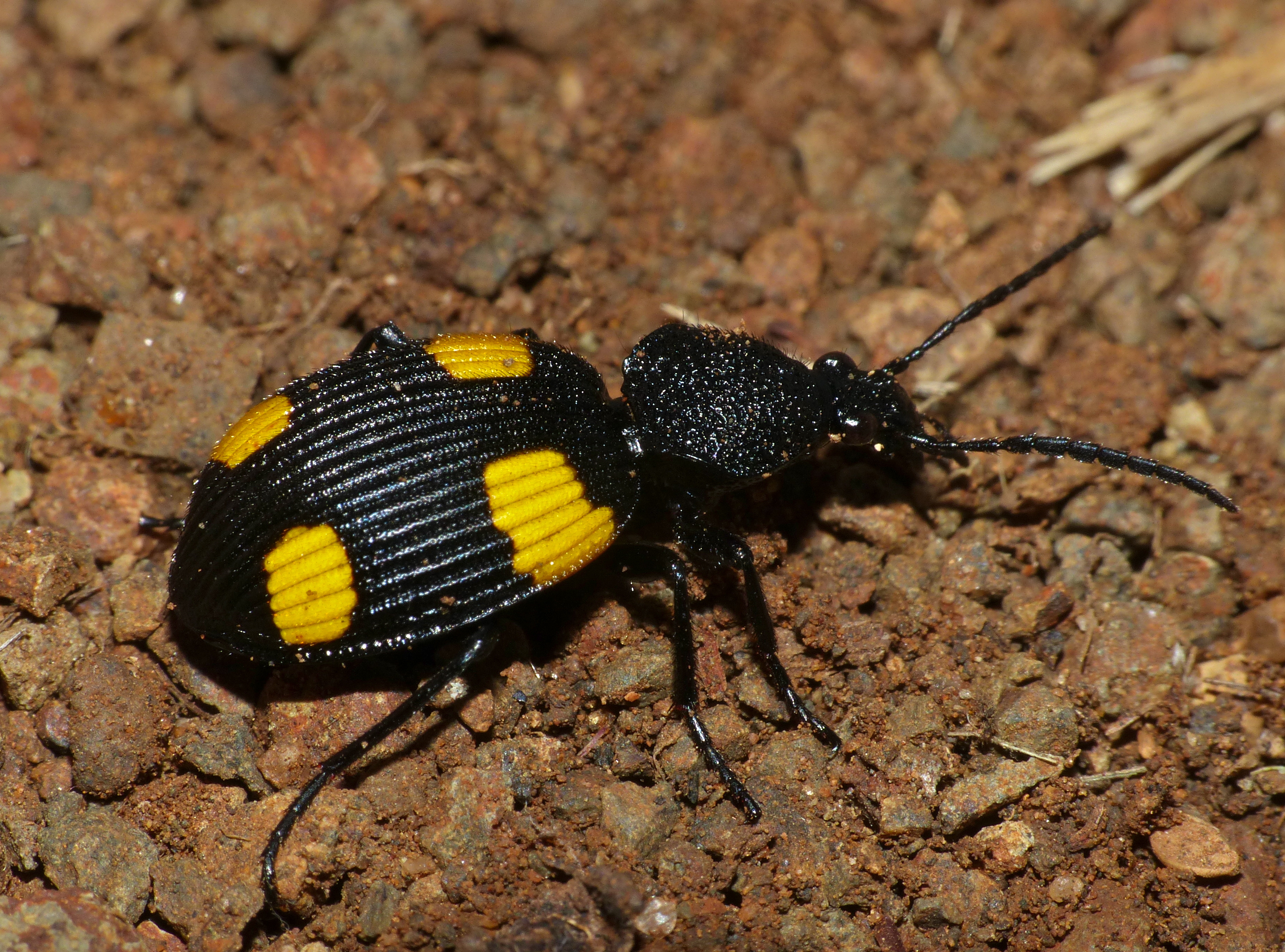
- Craspedophorus bonvouloirii

Scientific classification
- Kingdom: Animalia
- Phylum: Arthropoda
- Clade: Pancrustacea
- Class: Insecta
- Order: Coleoptera
- Suborder: Adephaga
- Family: Carabidae
- Subfamily: Panagaeinae
- Genus: Craspedophorus; Hope, 1838

Synonyms
- Acanthocosmus Jeannel, 1949; Brachycosmus Jeannel, 1949; Brachyonychus Chaudoir, 1879; Camptoderus Hope, 1838; Epicosmus Chaudoir, 1846; Eudema Laporte, 1840; Isotarsus LaFerté-Sénectère, 1851

= Craspedophorus =

Genus of beetles

Craspedophorus is a genus in the beetle family Carabidae. Described species of Craspedophorus are mostly recorded from Africa, South and S.E. Asia through to Australia.

== Species ==
These 165 species belong to the genus Craspedophorus:

- Craspedophorus abnormis Bates, 1886
- Craspedophorus affinis Fedorenko, 2016
- Craspedophorus alaticollis (Bates, 1892)
- Craspedophorus alternans (Laporte, 1867)
- Craspedophorus angulatus (Fabricius, 1781)
- Craspedophorus angusticeps Sloane, 1923
- Craspedophorus assamensis Häckel & Kirschenhofer, 2014
- Craspedophorus australasiae (Chaudoir, 1850)
- Craspedophorus australis (Dejean, 1831)
- Craspedophorus austronesiensis Häckel & Kirschenhofer, 2014
- Craspedophorus banksi Sloane, 1923
- Craspedophorus bayeri (Burgeon, 1930)
- Craspedophorus begdugulensis Kirschenhofer, 2011
- Craspedophorus benadirensis (G.Müller, 1942)
- Craspedophorus benoiti (Basilewsky, 1953)
- Craspedophorus bifasciatus (Laporte, 1835)
- Craspedophorus bisemilunatus (Xie & Yu, 1991)
- Craspedophorus bonnyi Bates, 1890
- Craspedophorus bonvouloirii (Chaudoir, 1862)
- Craspedophorus bouvieri (Rousseau, 1905)
- Craspedophorus bretschneideri Kirschenhofer, 2011
- Craspedophorus breviceps Fedorenko, 2016
- Craspedophorus brevicollis (Dejean, 1831)
- Craspedophorus breviformis (Bates, 1892)
- Craspedophorus brevisternis (Bates, 1892)
- Craspedophorus buettneri Kolbe, 1889
- Craspedophorus cameronus Bates, 1886
- Craspedophorus carbonarius (Harold, 1879)
- Craspedophorus cenwanglao Häckel & Kirschenhofer, 2014
- Craspedophorus cereus (W.S.MacLeay, 1825)
- Craspedophorus chaudoiri (Andrewes, 1919)
- Craspedophorus chevalieri (Alluaud, 1915)
- Craspedophorus chiangdaoensis Häckel & Kirschenhofer, 2014
- Craspedophorus chiangmaiensis Häckel & Kirschenhofer, 2014
- Craspedophorus comptus LaFerté-Sénectère, 1851
- Craspedophorus congoanus Kolbe, 1889
- Craspedophorus conspicuus Basilewsky, 1987
- Craspedophorus cordicollis (Raffray, 1886)
- Craspedophorus crebrepunctatus Fedorenko, 2016
- Craspedophorus cuneatus (Alluaud, 1915)
- Craspedophorus dalatensis Fedorenko, 2016
- Craspedophorus deflexus Bates, 1886
- Craspedophorus dembickyi Kirschenhofer, 2000
- Craspedophorus dicranothorax (Alluaud, 1915)
- Craspedophorus dicranulothorax Häckel, 2017
- Craspedophorus elongatus (Laporte, 1867)
- Craspedophorus erichsonii (Hope, 1842)
- Craspedophorus everetti (Heller, 1898)
- Craspedophorus expansicollis Fedorenko, 2016
- Craspedophorus facchinii Häckel & Kirschenhofer, 2014
- Craspedophorus feae (Bates, 1889)
- Craspedophorus festivus (Klug, 1833)
- Craspedophorus freudei Jedlicka, 1966
- Craspedophorus gabonicus J.Thomson, 1858
- Craspedophorus galla (Raffray, 1886)
- Craspedophorus geniculatus (Wiedemann, 1823)
- Craspedophorus ghesquierei Burgeon, 1930
- Craspedophorus glaber Bates, 1886
- Craspedophorus gracilipes (Bates, 1892)
- Craspedophorus gratiosus (Chaudoir, 1879)
- Craspedophorus gratus (Chaudoir, 1854)
- Craspedophorus gressittorum Darlington, 1971
- Craspedophorus guttiferus (Schaum, 1854)
- Craspedophorus hainanensis (Tian & Chen, 1997)
- Craspedophorus hajeki (Häckel & Kirschenhofer, 2014)
- Craspedophorus halyi Andrewes, 1923
- Craspedophorus hanangensis Häckel, 2020
- Craspedophorus hesperos (Häckel & Kirschenhofer, 2014)
- Craspedophorus hexagonus (Chaudoir, 1862)
- Craspedophorus hilaris (LaFerté-Sénectère, 1851)
- Craspedophorus horaki Häckel & Kirschenhofer, 2014
- Craspedophorus hovorkai Häckel & Kirschenhofer, 2014
- Craspedophorus huensis Häckel & Kirschenhofer, 2014
- Craspedophorus imperialis Burgeon, 1930
- Craspedophorus impictus (Boheman, 1848)
- Craspedophorus incostatus Kirschenhofer, 2000
- Craspedophorus insignis (Schaum, 1854)
- Craspedophorus jakli Häckel & Kirschenhofer, 2014
- Craspedophorus jeanneli Alluaud, 1930
- Craspedophorus kabakovi Fedorenko, 2016
- Craspedophorus kaboboanus Basilewsky, 1987
- Craspedophorus kalimantanensis (Häckel & Kirschenhofer, 2014)
- Craspedophorus kathmanduensis Kirschenhofer, 2004
- Craspedophorus kerberos Häckel & Kirschenhofer, 2014
- Craspedophorus kirschenhoferi Häckel & Anichtchenko, 2015
- Craspedophorus kiwlomensis Häckel & Kirschenhofer, 2014
- Craspedophorus klugii (Hope, 1842)
- Craspedophorus kubani Kirschenhofer, 2011
- Craspedophorus laevifrons Schaum, 1863
- Craspedophorus lafertei Murray, 1857
- Craspedophorus lankaensis Häckel & Kirschenhofer, 2014
- Craspedophorus latemaculatus Alluaud, 1930
- Craspedophorus laticollis (Chaudoir, 1869)
- Craspedophorus latifrons (Chaudoir, 1876)
- Craspedophorus latigenis (Bates, 1892)
- Craspedophorus latipennis Burgeon, 1930
- Craspedophorus lemariei Häckel, 2017
- Craspedophorus leprieurii (Laporte, 1835)
- Craspedophorus lesnei Andrewes, 1926
- Craspedophorus longicollis (Chaudoir, 1879)
- Craspedophorus luzonensis Häckel & Anichtchenko, 2015
- Craspedophorus lykaon Kirschenhofer, 2012
- Craspedophorus macleayi (Sloane, 1903)
- Craspedophorus maculatus Kirschenhofer, 2000
- Craspedophorus magnicollis (Quedenfeldt, 1883)
- Craspedophorus maharashtraensis Kirschenhofer, 2011
- Craspedophorus mandarinellus (Bates, 1892)
- Craspedophorus mandarinus (Schaum, 1854)
- Craspedophorus mannae Andrewes, 1930
- Craspedophorus merus Péringuey, 1904
- Craspedophorus microcephalus (Dejean, 1831)
- Craspedophorus microspilotus Andrewes, 1924
- Craspedophorus mniszechi (Chaudoir, 1879)
- Craspedophorus montivagus Basilewsky, 1976
- Craspedophorus mouhotii (Chaudoir, 1869)
- Craspedophorus muata (Harold, 1878)
- Craspedophorus nepalensis (Kirschenhofer, 1996)
- Craspedophorus nigrita (Künckel d'Herculais, 1891)
- Craspedophorus nobilis (Dejean, 1826)
- Craspedophorus obesus Louwerens, 1953
- Craspedophorus obscurus Xie & Yu, 1991
- Craspedophorus opulentus (Péringuey, 1898)
- Craspedophorus ornatus (Boheman, 1848)
- Craspedophorus oxygonus (Chaudoir, 1862)
- Craspedophorus pacholatkoi Kirschenhofer, 2000
- Craspedophorus pallidicornis Fedorenko, 2016
- Craspedophorus parvulus (W.J.MacLeay, 1888)
- Craspedophorus phenacoides Häckel, 2017
- Craspedophorus phenax Basilewsky, 1987
- Craspedophorus philippinus Jedlicka, 1939
- Craspedophorus phoupanensis Häckel & Kirschenhofer, 2014
- Craspedophorus pretiosus (Chaudoir, 1837)
- Craspedophorus probsti (Kirschenhofer, 1996)
- Craspedophorus pubiger (Chaudoir, 1862)
- Craspedophorus pungens (Alluaud, 1895)
- Craspedophorus qiongensis Pang & Tian, 2012
- Craspedophorus reflexus (Fabricius, 1781)
- Craspedophorus regalis (Gory, 1833)
- Craspedophorus rikatlensis (Péringuey, 1896)
- Craspedophorus rockhamptonensis (Laporte, 1867)
- Craspedophorus ruficroides Häckel, 2017
- Craspedophorus ruficrus (LaFerté-Sénectère, 1851)
- Craspedophorus rufipalpis (LaFerté-Sénectère, 1851)
- Craspedophorus ruvumanus Häckel, 2016
- Craspedophorus saundersii (Chaudoir, 1869)
- Craspedophorus selenoderus (LaFerté-Sénectère, 1850)
- Craspedophorus sikkimensis Häckel & Kirschenhofer, 2014
- Craspedophorus simplicicollis Burgeon, 1930
- Craspedophorus somalicus Basilewsky, 1987
- Craspedophorus soppongensis Kirschenhofer, 2011
- Craspedophorus sparsepunctatus Fedorenko, 2016
- Craspedophorus stanleyi Alluaud, 1930
- Craspedophorus stenocephalus (Reiche, 1850)
- Craspedophorus strachani (Hope, 1842)
- Craspedophorus strangulatus Murray, 1857
- Craspedophorus subgratiosus Basilewsky, 1987
- Craspedophorus sublaevis (Chaudoir, 1869)
- Craspedophorus sundaicus (Oberthür, 1883)
- Craspedophorus tamdaoensis Häckel & Kirschenhofer, 2014
- Craspedophorus tetrastigma (Chaudoir, 1850)
- Craspedophorus transversalis (Laporte, 1835)
- Craspedophorus tropicus (Hope, 1842)
- Craspedophorus unicolor (Chaudoir, 1878)
- Craspedophorus vietnamensis (Häckel & Kirschenhofer, 2014)
- Craspedophorus volana (Alluaud, 1895)
