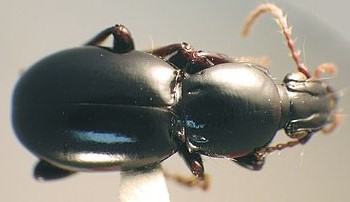
- Eripus oaxacanus

Scientific classification
- Kingdom: Animalia
- Phylum: Arthropoda
- Class: Insecta
- Order: Coleoptera
- Suborder: Adephaga
- Family: Carabidae
- Subfamily: Panagaeinae
- Tribe: Peleciini; Chaudoir, 1880

Subtribes
- Agonicina Sloane, 1920; Peleciina Chaudoir, 1880

= Peleciini =

Tribe of beetles

Peleciini is a tribe of ground beetles in the family Carabidae. There are about 8 genera and more than 90 described species in Peleciini. They are found mainly in the southern hemisphere.

== Genera ==
These subtribes and genera belong to the tribe Peleciini:

- Subtribe Agonicina Sloane, 1920
  - Agonica Sloane, 1920 (Australia)
  - Pseudagonica B.Moore, 1960 (Australia)
- Subtribe Peleciina
  - Ardistomopsis Straneo & Ball, 1989 (India, Sri Lanka)
  - Disphericus G.R.Waterhouse, 1842 (Africa)
  - Dyschiridium Chaudoir, 1861 (Africa, Vietnam)
  - Eripus Dejean, 1829 (Mexico, Central and South America)
  - Pelecium Kirby, 1819 (Central and South America)
  - Stricteripus Straneo & Ball, 1989 (South America)
