= Craspedophorus festivus =

Scientific classification
- Kingdom: Animalia
- Phylum: Arthropoda
- Class: Insecta
- Order: Coleoptera
- Suborder: Adephaga
- Family: Carabidae
- Genus: Craspedophorus
- Species: C. festivus

Binomial name
- Craspedophorus festivus (Klug, 1833)

Synonyms
- Panagaeus festivus Klug, 1833; Eudema festivum (Klug, 1833)

Species of beetle

Craspedophorus festivus is a species of ground beetles in the family Carabidae.
