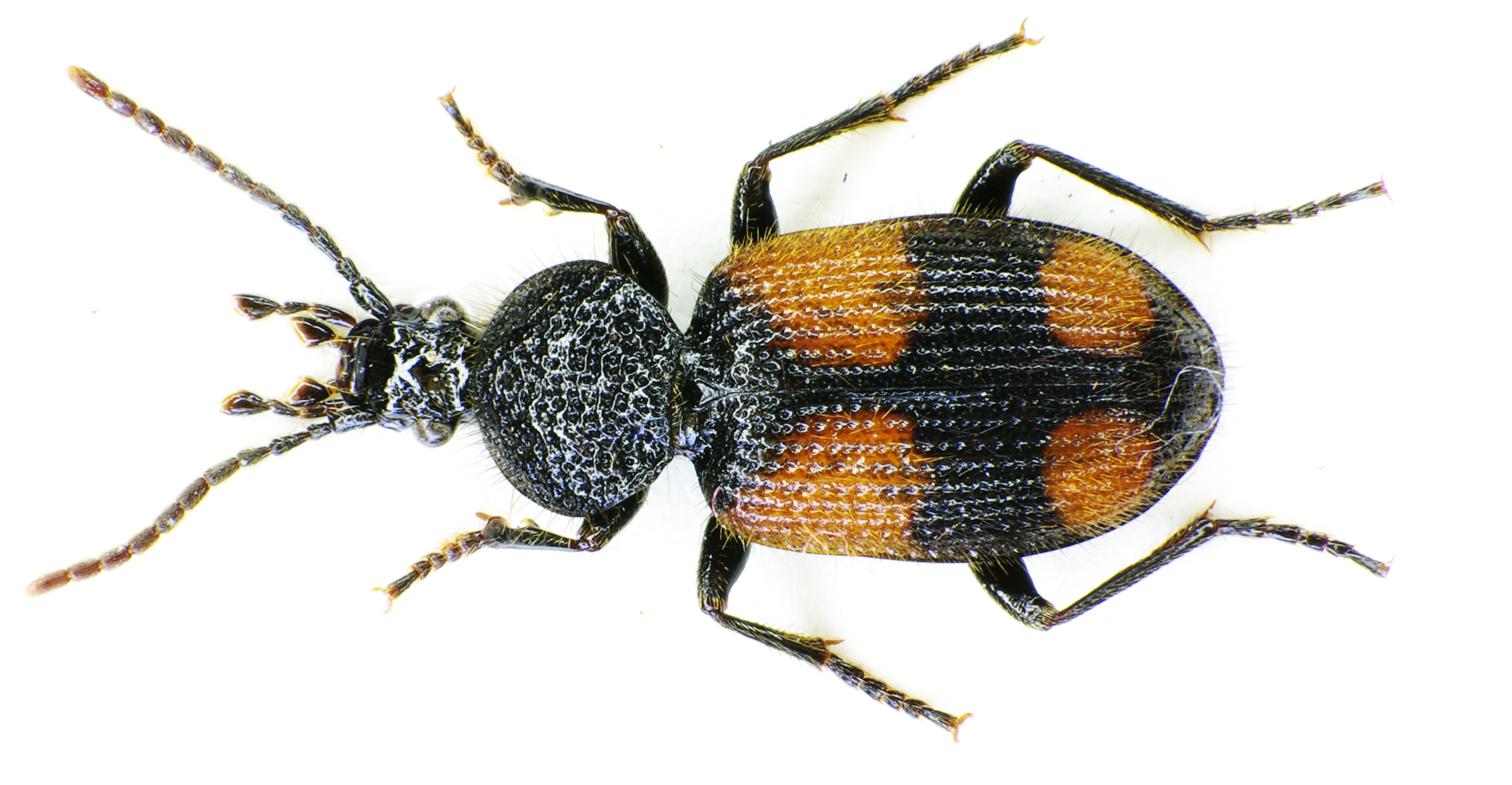

Scientific classification
- Kingdom: Animalia
- Phylum: Arthropoda
- Class: Insecta
- Order: Coleoptera
- Suborder: Adephaga
- Family: Carabidae
- Genus: Panagaeus
- Species: P. bipustulatus

Binomial name
- Panagaeus bipustulatus (Fabricius, 1775)

Synonyms
- Panagaeus quadripustulatus Sturm, 1815

= Panagaeus bipustulatus =

Species of beetle

Panagaeus bipustulatus is a species of ground beetle native to Europe and the Near East. In Europe, it is found in Austria, Belarus, Belgium, Bosnia and Herzegovina, Bulgaria, the Czech Republic, mainland Denmark, Estonia, Finland, mainland France, Germany, Great Britain including the Isle of Man, Hungary, mainland Italy, Kaliningrad, Latvia, Liechtenstein, Lithuania, Luxembourg, Moldova, Poland, Romania, Russia, Slovakia, Slovenia, mainland Spain, Sweden, Switzerland, the Netherlands and Ukraine.
