= Dischissus =

Scientific classification
- Domain: Eukaryota
- Kingdom: Animalia
- Phylum: Arthropoda
- Class: Insecta
- Order: Coleoptera
- Suborder: Adephaga
- Family: Carabidae
- Genus: Dischissus
- Species: D. mirandus

Binomial name
- Dischissus mirandus Bates, 1873

Genus of beetles

Dischissus mirandus is a species of beetle in the family Carabidae, the only species in the genus Dischissus.
