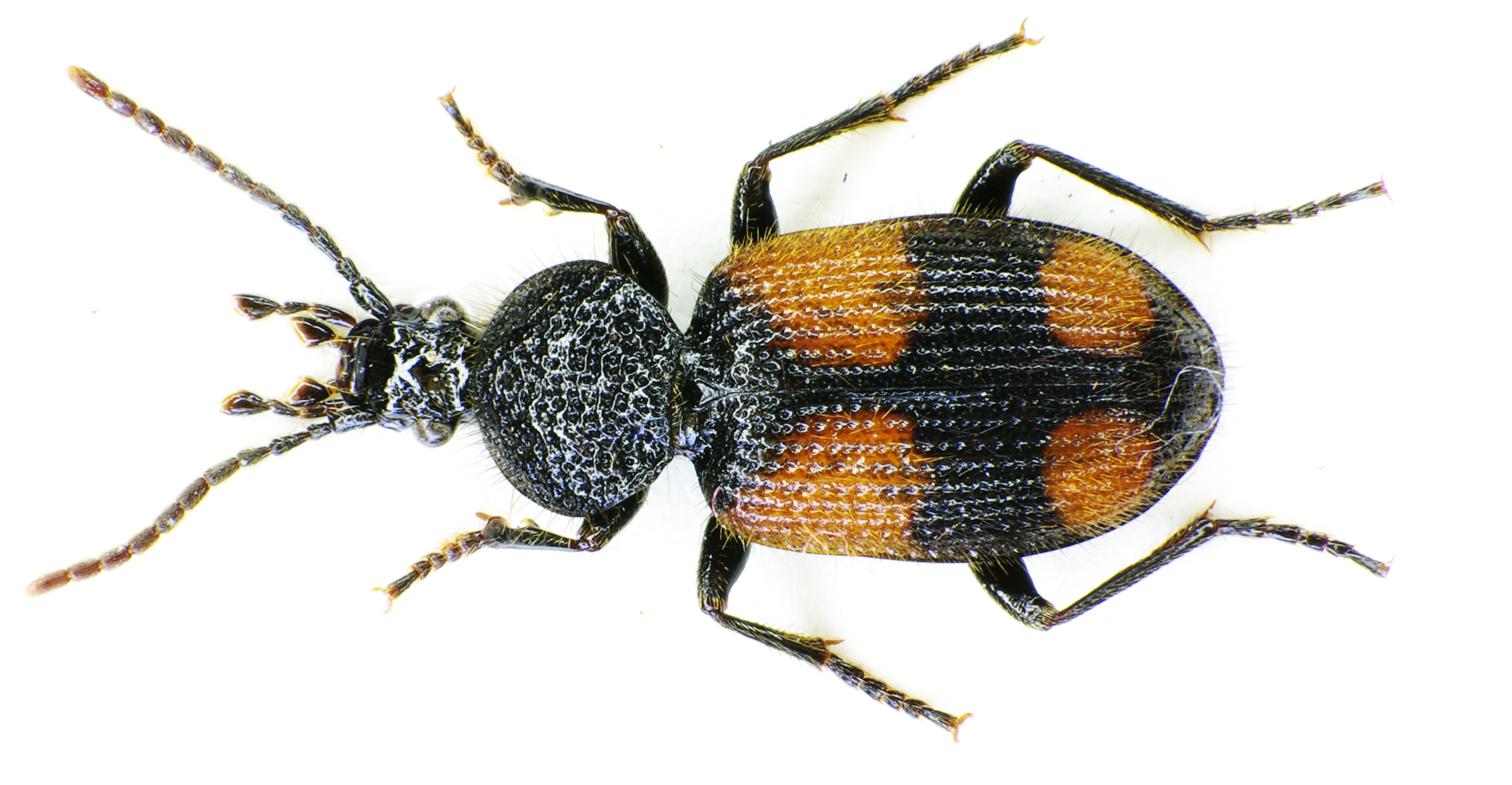
- Panagaeus bipustulatus

Scientific classification
- Domain: Eukaryota
- Kingdom: Animalia
- Phylum: Arthropoda
- Class: Insecta
- Order: Coleoptera
- Suborder: Adephaga
- Family: Carabidae
- Subfamily: Panagaeinae; Bonelli, 1810

= Panagaeinae =

Subfamily of beetles

Panagaeinae is a subfamily of beetles in the family Carabidae. There are more than 30 genera and 400 described species in Panagaeinae.

== Genera ==
These tribes belong to the subfamily Panagaeinae:

Brachygnathini Basilewsky, 1946 (1 species)
Panagaeini Bonelli, 1810 (22 species)
Peleciini Chaudoir, 1880 (8 species)
