= Architecture of the oil tanker =

Oil tanker structure

Oil tankers generally have from 8 to 12 tanks. Each tank is split into two or three independent compartments by fore-and-aft bulkheads. The tanks are numbered with tank one being the forwardmost. Individual compartments are referred to by the tank number and the athwartships position, such as "one port", "three starboard", or "six center".

A cofferdam is a small space left open between two bulkheads, to give protection from heat, fire, or collision. Tankers generally have cofferdams forward and aft of the cargo tanks, and sometimes between individual tanks. A pumproom houses all the pumps connected to a tanker's cargo lines. Some larger tankers have two pumprooms. A pumproom generally spans the total breadth of the ship.

== Hull designs ==
A major component of tanker architecture is the design of the hull or outer structure. A tanker with a single outer shell between the product and the ocean is said to be single-hulled. Most newer tankers are double-hulled, with an extra space between the hull and the storage tanks. Hybrid designs such as double-bottom and double-sided combine aspects of single and double-hull designs. All single-hulled tankers should have been phased out as of 2015, in accordance with amendments to Annex I of the MARPOL Convention. the International Maritime Organization (IMO) distinguishes three categories of tankers that will be phased out:

- Category 1 - oil tankers of 20,000 tonnes deadweight and above carrying crude oil, fuel oil, heavy diesel oil or lubricating oil as cargo, and of 30,000 tonnes deadweight and above carrying other oils, which do not comply with the requirements for protectively located segregated ballast tanks (commonly known as Pre-MARPOL tankers)
- Category 2 - as category 1, but complying with protectively located segregated ballast tank requirements (MARPOL tankers), and
- Category 3 - oil tankers of 5,000 tonnes deadweight and above but less than the tonnage specified for Category 1 and 2 tankers

=== Phased out types ===
PreMARPOL tanker

==== PreMARPOL tanker ====
Category 1 tankers have been phased out in 2005. These so-called preMARPOL tankers were single hull only with some segregated ballast tanks. Around one third of the cargo tanks also acted as ballast tanks. During ballast discharge oil was released into the environment. These tankers did not extend high above the water line, allowing Hydrostatically Balanced Loading (HBL), so relatively little oil was spilled in case of bottom damage.

30 percent of the side shell in way of the tanks of a MARPOL tanker should be non-cargo.

==== MARPOL tanker ====
Category 2 tankers were used for a number of years and were planned to be phased out by 2010 at the latest, depending on the year of delivery. With MARPOL tankers, it is not allowed to use ballast tanks as cargo tanks. This has reduced operational spillage drastically. The downside is designs based on MARPOL spill more oil when damaged than a preMARPOL tankers. This is due to several factors:

1. as ballast tanks could not be used as cargo tanks anymore, cargo space was lost. To compensate for this, tanks were made taller, which means that more oil is spilled before hydrostatic balance is reached,
2. a MARPOL rule is that 30 percent of the side shell in way of the tanks of a MARPOL tanker should be non-cargo. The cheapest way to reach this, is by making these tanks as narrow as possible. This means that centre tanks became extremely large, so in case of damage, the amount of spillage increased,
3. in a preMARPOL tanker ballast tanks were also filled with inert gas, as these were also used as cargo tanks, which reduced corrosion. Ballast tanks of MARPOL tankers are not protective this way, causing structural failure by corrosion on the Erika, Castor and Prestige,
4. the painted area tripled, increasing required maintenance and corrosion in case this maintenance is done poorly.

==== Category 3 ====
These small tankers will also be phased out by 2010.

=== New types ===
After the Exxon Valdez disaster, public outcry became so strong that authorities were forced to come with preventive measures. Especially the double hull design was favoured and although this is not the best design in all cases, because of the Oil Pollution Act of 1990 or OPA 90, this is the only design currently in operation.

==== Double hull ====
Double hull tanker

OPA 90 caused the phasing out of single hull tankers in the United States between 1997 and 2000 — apart from tankers lightering off the coast, which were allowed to be single hull until 2015. In this design, cargo tanks are protected by ballast tanks of at least 2 metres. As long as this barrier is not breached, there will be no spillage.

In 1998, the Marine Board of the National Academy of Sciences conducted a survey of industry experts regarding the pros and cons of double-hull design. Some of the advantages of the double-hull design that were mentioned include ease of ballasting in emergency situations, reduced practice of saltwater ballasting in cargo tanks decreases corrosion, increased environmental protection, cargo discharge is quicker, more complete and easier, tank washing is more efficient, and better protection in low-impact collisions and grounding.

The same report lists the following as some drawbacks to the double-hull design, including more expensive to build, higher canal and port expenses, ballast tank ventilation difficult, ballast tanks need continual monitoring and maintenance, increased transverse free surface, more surfaces to maintain, explosion risk in double-hull spaces if vapor detection system not fitted, cleaning mud from ballast spaces a bigger problem.

In all, double-hull tankers are said to be safer than a single-hull in a grounding incident, especially when the shore is not very rocky. The safety benefits are less clear on larger vessels and in cases of high speed impact.

Other downsides of this design are:

1. as small leakages from cargo tanks do not spill in sea, they can go unnoticed for a long time. This can cause an explosive mixture in ballast tanks, as there is no requirement to connect these to the inert gas system,
2. the painted area is three times as large as on a MARPOL tanker, and almost tenfold compared to a preMARPOL tanker.

Although double-hull design is superior in low energy casualties and prevents spillage in small casualties, in high energy casualties where both hulls are breached, oil can spill through the double-hull and into the sea and spills from a double-hull tanker can be significantly higher than designs like the Mid-Deck Tanker, the Coulombi Egg Tanker and even a pre-MARPOL tanker, as the last one has a lower oil column and reaches hydrostatic balance sooner.

==== Mid-Deck Oil Tanker ====
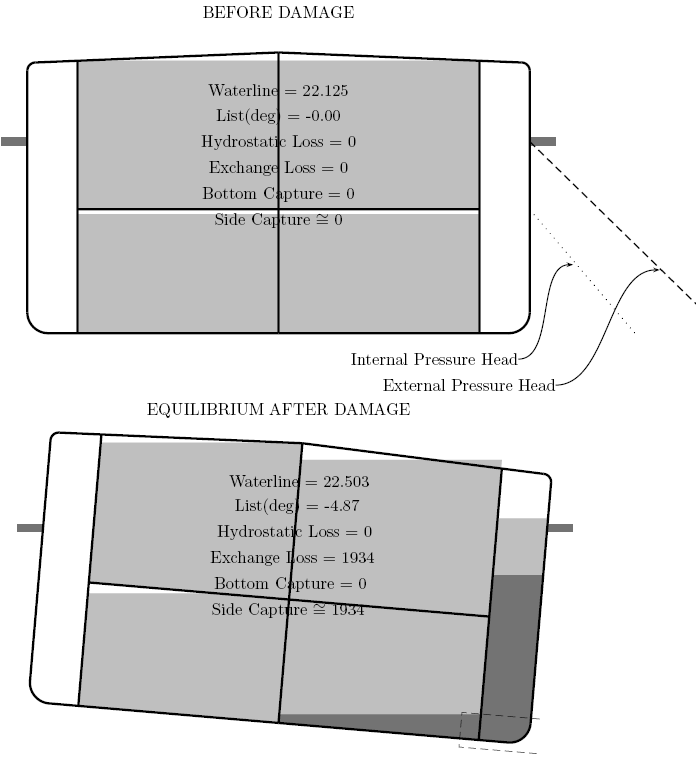
Mid-Deck Tanker, damage up 3 m. Light gray is oil, dark gray is seawater.

A Mid-Deck Tanker is a tanker design, which includes an additional deck intended to limit spills if the tanker is damaged. The extra deck is placed at about the middle of the draft of the ship.

With double hull tankers, in high energy casualties where both hulls are breached, oil can spill through the double-hull and into the sea. In grounding events of this type, a mid-deck design overcomes this by eliminating the double-bottom compartments that are void with air. Since the density of seawater is greater than that of oil, water comes into the tanks instead of oil escaping out, and rather than spilling, oil is vented upwards into overflow tanks.

If the Exxon Valdez had been a Mid-Deck ship, she would have spilled very little oil.

==== Coulombi Egg Tanker ====
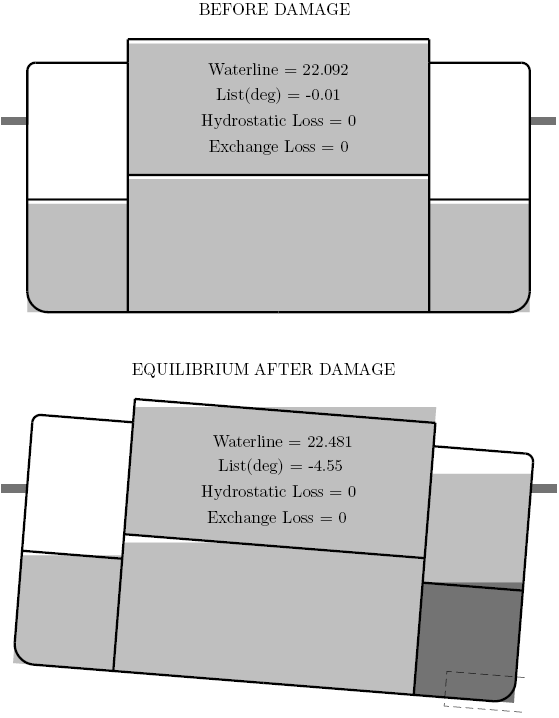
Coulombi Egg, damage up 3 m. Light gray is oil, dark gray is seawater.

A variation on the Mid-Deck Tanker is the Coulombi Egg Tanker, which was approved by IMO as an alternative to the double hull concept. The design consists of a series of centre and wing tanks that are divided by horizontal bulkheads. The upper wing tanks form ballast tanks and act as emergency receiver tanks for cargo should the lower tanks be fractured. The lower tanks are connected to these ballast tanks by non-return valves. The United States Coast Guard does not allow this design to enter US waters, effectively preventing it from being built.

When a lower tank is damaged, the incoming sea water pushes the oil in the damaged tank up into the ballast tank. Because of the hydrostatic pressure, there is an automatic transfer out of the damaged tank. The double-hull design is aimed at the probability of zero outflow. In low energy casualties where only the outside hull is penetrated, this will be the case. However, in high energy casualties both hulls are penetrated. As the tanks of a double hull tanker are larger than those of MARPOL-tankers and preMARPOL-tankers and the height of the cargo above the water line is higher, the resulting spill can be much larger than these single hull designs. In the Coulombi Egg design spillage is greatly reduced, possibly to zero.

Where a double hull VLCC has a ballast tank coated area of about 225,000 m^{3}, in a Coulombi Egg tanker this area is reduced to 66,000 m^{3}. This reduces maintenance and corrosion risks, which otherwise may result in structural failure.

== Inert gas system ==
An oil tanker's inert gas system is one of the most important parts of its design. Fuel oil itself is very difficult to ignite, however its hydrocarbon vapors are explosive when mixed with air in certain concentrations. The purpose of the system is to create an atmosphere inside tanks in which the hydrocarbon oil vapors cannot burn.

As inert gas is introduced into a mixture of hydrocarbon vapors and air, it increases the lower flammable limit or lowest concentration at which the vapors can be ignited. At the same time it decreases the upper flammable limit or highest concentration at which the vapors can be ignited. When the total concentration of oxygen in the tank reaches about 11%, the upper and lower flammable limits converge and the flammable range disappears.

Inert gas systems deliver air with an oxygen concentration of less than 5% by volume. As a tank is pumped out, it's filled with inert gas and kept in this safe state until the next cargo is loaded. The exception is in cases when the tank must be entered. Safely gas-freeing a tank is accomplished by purging hydrocarbon vapors with inert gas until the hydrocarbon concentration inside the tank is under about 1%. Thus, as air replaces the inert gas, the concentration cannot rise to the lower flammable limit and is safe.

== See also ==
- List of oil spills
- List of replenishment ships of the Royal Fleet Auxiliary
- List of tankers
- List of Type T2 tankers
- Marine transfer operations
- Hydraulic tanker
