= Xcel Energy Cabin Creek fire =

Industrial Accident

Coordinates: 39°39′18.6″N 105°42′31.0″W

- Date: October 2, 2007
- Location: Georgetown, Colorado, U.S.
- Deaths: 5
- Injuries: 3

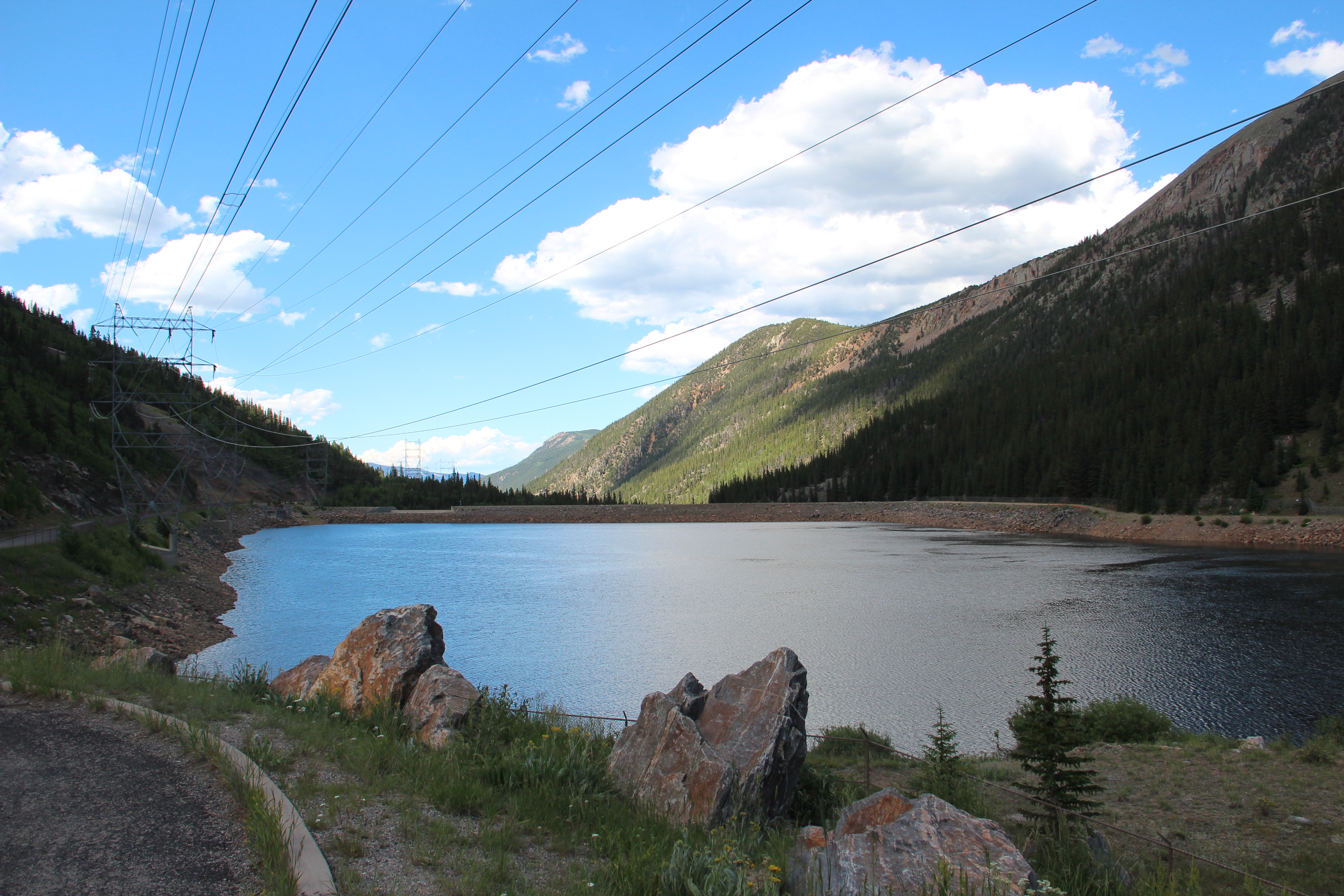
Cabin Creek Generating Station, where the fire occurred

The Xcel Energy Cabin Creek Fire occurred on October 2, 2007, at Xcel Energy’s pumped storage hydroelectric plant near Georgetown, Colorado, a small town forty-five miles west of Denver. The accident killed five workers and injured three.

Xcel paid millions of dollars in compensation to the workers' families and U.S. Occupational Safety and Health Administration fines, but was found innocent of criminal charges. RPI Coating, the contractor who was directly responsible for the work, pled guilty to violation of federal safety regulations.

== The plant ==
The plant, the Cabin Creek Generating station, is a pumped storage hydroelectric generator that opened in 1967. It is located about 6 miles from Georgetown, accessed by the high mountain road of Guanella Pass. It sits at an elevation of greater than 10,000 feet above sea level. The power plant runs two generators that, when running at top performance, can deliver a total 324 megawatts of electrical power to the Shoshone Transmission Line. The plant is powered by water pressure from the water released from a storage reservoir. General Electric expected to complete a major refurbishment to the plant in 2020.

== Incident ==
=== Prior events ===
In 2000, a Federal Energy Regulatory Commission-initiated inspection of the penstock (a long, sloping tunnel and confined space running nearly 3/4 of a mile) found that the epoxy lining on the interior of the pipes was deteriorating. This was leading to damage of the pipes themselves and Xcel was mandated to repair the epoxy to limit further damage. Work did not begin in earnest until seven years later, as the company had successfully been granted extensions to the deadline for this work to be completed.

Xcel Energy selected RPI Coating Inc. after a competitive RFP process. This was despite RPI having had more than $100,000 of fines levied against it by the Occupational Safety and Health Administration (OSHA), and Xcel's own rating of the company's safety profile as "zero." A zero should have automatically disqualified RPI from the bid process. Safety concerns had been identified by Xcel's safety director and RPI arranged for a specialist to be brought to the Cabin Creek site to address specific training for operating safely during work at the plant. While 14 crew members were slated to be working on the site, only nine attended the six-hour safety meeting.

In September 2007, the tunnel was prepped for work by Xcel and RPI. This involved shutting down the plant, draining via the penstock, and creating an access point for equipment and workers. A single ingress/egress point in such a culvert would later prove to be deadly; if the route to the single point of exit were blocked, workers would become trapped. This was not the only hazard: an RPI worker dislocated a shoulder during this process, after slipping on the moss-covered floor of the tunnel. Sand blasting and other prep work would last through the month of September.

Internal Xcel documents show that the penstock was a permit-required confined space work area. This would have required a costly set of safety mechanisms to be put in place, including work environment monitoring, specialized rescue team on site, and rigorous control of flammable substances. Neither Xcel nor RPI actually treated the work site as a permit-required confined space.

In early October, re-application of the epoxy coat started with about a dozen workers inside the penstock. An epoxy sprayer was operated by a small crew, workers did prep work ahead, and others ran material from the tunnel opening to the sprayer. While the epoxy itself was not volatile at the temperatures being used, it was applied at temperatures that were below the optimum for ideal use. To cope with this, and to help with regular cleaning, a solvent was used to keep the spray equipment free from contamination. RPI workers used methyl ethyl ketone (MEK), a highly volatile chemical with a low flash point, as the solvent. It was used on the sprayer as it sat inside the culvert, where multiple sources of ignition were present.

=== Explosion ===
On October 2 around 1:55 pm, when a safety inspector and general foreman were out to lunch, a flash fire engulfed the sprayer platform while MEK was being circulated through the equipment. A growing fire separated the work group; five workers were on the far side of the burning spray platform, unable to reach the single point of exit, more than 1400 feet away. The separated workers were able to shout over the fire and ask for fire extinguishers, but none were located inside the tunnel. Other workers would have to leave the penstock and get fire extinguishers from outside. They then had to re-enter the now smoke-filled culvert while the fire spread to other containers of MEK and other material around the spray platform. The trapped workers retreated up a steep section of the culvert. Due to poor visibility, thick smoke, and other fumes, workers with fire extinguishers were unable to reach the fire and it continued to burn. The workers trapped by the fire were uninjured in the explosion and maintained radio contact until 2:45 pm.

=== Emergency response ===
Clear Creek County Emergency Dispatch first received word of the incident at 2:03 pm after an RPI contractor notified Xcel about the incident and the Xcel employee called 9-1-1. First responders were immediately dispatched, but were not told that the fire was in a confined space, nor that specialized equipment by highly trained rescuers would be needed. After the scale of the rescue was recognized, local first responders requested the help of Denver's West Metro Fire Rescue, which was trained for confined-space rescues in their role as the sponsoring agency for Urban Search and Rescue Colorado Task Force 1 and had a mutual aid agreement with the Clear Creek Fire Department for confined-space rescues. The Clear Creek Fire Department also requested a mine rescue team from Climax Molybdenum Company's Henderson mine. Both agencies were over an hour away. Local responders, including a backcountry rescue team, made a single attempt to enter the tunnel, using breathing apparatus and an ATV. Conditions were still very hazardous in the culvert, including toxic fumes and black smoke reducing visibility to zero. The rescuers were forced to turn back. Attempts to lower breathing apparatus, a radio and other equipment to the trapped workers were also made.

Ultimately, the Henderson Mine Rescue Team would make entry into the tunnel and confirm both that the fire was out and that five workers were dead. Donald Dejaynes, 43, Dupree Holt, 37, James St. Peters, 52, Gary Foster, 48, and Anthony Aguirre, 18, asphyxiated.

The four surviving workers were transported to a Denver hospital where they were all treated and subsequently released. In recognition of the tragic event, Colorado state governor Bill Ritter later traveled to Georgetown to meet with the families of the deceased. The U.S. Chemical Safety and Hazard Investigation Board has completed an investigation into this incident.

== Investigation and aftermath ==
=== Investigation ===
The case was investigated by the US Chemical Safety and Hazard Investigation Board and a formal report was released on August 25, 2010. The investigation was hampered by Xcel and RPI refusing to furnish testimony, evidence, and response to questions from the investigating board. Many RPI managers invoked their fifth amendment right from self-incrimination. Indeed, despite the Chemical Safety Board having a federal mandate to investigate and report about the accident, Xcel energy went to court to block the release of the report, saying it would be detrimental to their court case. Xcel Energy also leaked a confidential draft of the report to the media before the official report was released.

Among the findings of the investigation:

- MEK was the source of the flash fire
- Both Xcel and RPI knew in advance of the need to use a flammable solvent inside the penstock
- Despite the penstock having very limited egress routes, ventilation, and very dangerous working conditions, neither Xcel nor RPI treated the tunnel as a permit-required confined space as required by OSHA
- Neither Xcel nor RPI's training and safety programs were adequate for the task of working in the penstock
- Both Xcel and RPI had, prior to the accident, identified a single point of egress as a major safety concern, yet did nothing about it
- The emergency action plan of calling 911 was inadequate, as the local emergency service providers were not equipped, nor trained, to respond to an emergency in a confined space
- Xcel Energy did not follow their own guidelines when selecting RPI as a contractor for the job; RPI received a safety rating of "zero" and should have been excluded from contention, but proved to be the lowest bidder
- Xcel was aware of life-threatening working conditions at the site, yet did nothing about it

Allegations have been made that RPI destroyed evidence (log books, etc.) at the job site.

=== Criminal case against Xcel Energy and RPI Coating ===
On June 1, 2011, Federal prosecutors opened their charges that Xcel Energy was criminally liable for the deaths of the five RPI workers. On June 28, the jury found Xcel Energy not guilty.

The contractor, RPI Coating, had a long history of citations from both federal and state agencies. The company had accumulated fines totaling $135,569 from ninety incidents since 1988. Most of the fines stemmed from unsafe working conditions, such as a worker who was crushed by a work platform while working on the I-80 San Francisco Bay Bridge. These ninety incidents were accumulated while the company was operating under the name of Robison Prezioso Inc. Of the ninety fineable incidents, twenty-seven were violations considered serious by the OSHA.

On December 19, 2011, RPI Coating pleaded guilty to workplace safety violations and paid $1.55 million in a cash settlement. The company took responsibility for the deaths of five workers and the injuries to three. This plea deal prevented a civil lawsuit and subjected RPI to further monitoring for workplace safety violations.
