= Confined space =

Space with limited entry and egress and not suitable for human inhabitants

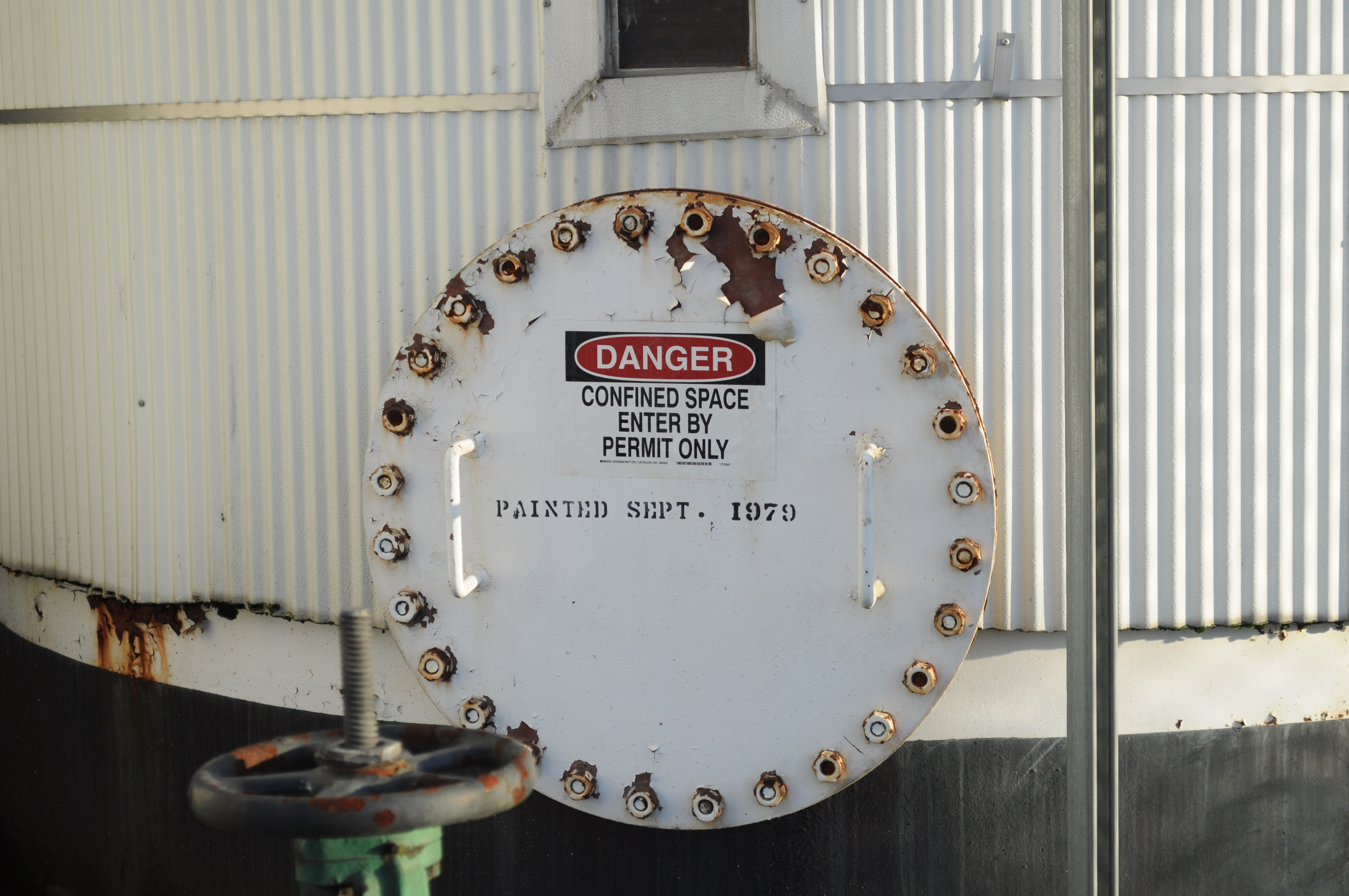
A confined space warning sign on process equipment.

A confined space is a space with limited entry and egress and not suitable for human inhabitants. Alternative names for a confined space are enclosed space and dangerous space. An example is the interior of a storage tank, occasionally entered by maintenance workers but not intended for human occupancy. Hazards in a confined space often include harmful dust or gases, asphyxiation, submersion in liquids or free-flowing granular solids (for example, grain bins), electrocution, or entrapment.

Confined space accidents are of particular concern in occupational safety and health due to the hazards that they pose to the victim and subsequently to a rescue team. Confined space training outlines the skills and protocols for safe entry to confined spaces, and includes precautions such as locking and tagging out connecting piping, testing of breathable air quality, forced ventilation, observation of workers in the space, and a predetermined rescue plan with appropriate safety harnesses and other rescue equipment standing by.

== Description ==
Although the definition of a confined space varies between jurisdictions, it is generally recognized as a space that:

- has limited or restricted means of entry or exit;
- is large enough for a person to enter to perform tasks;
- is not designed or configured for continuous occupancy;

A utility tunnel, the inside of a boiler (only accessible when the boiler is off), the inside of a fluid storage tank, a septic tank that has contained sewage, and a small underground electrical vault are all examples of confined spaces. Ships and other vessels commonly have confined spaces due to the need for compartmentalized watertight construction. The exact definition of a confined space varies depending on the type of industry. Until recently confined spaces on a construction site were defined differently than confined spaces in General Industry such as a paper mill. That changed due to a new confined space regulation for construction. Confined spaces that present special hazards to workers, including risks of toxic or asphyxiant gas accumulation, fires, falls, flooding, and entrapment may be classified as permit-required confined spaces depending on the nature and severity of the hazard.

Even normally habitable parts of a building such as corridors or offices may take on the characteristics of a confined space, during operations that alter normal ventilation and access. For example, a room may be wrapped in plastic sheeting for painting and any vapor emitted in the room may not be dispersed by blocked ventilation ducts. But these areas would not be defined as confined spaces by OSHA.

In addition to the hazards posed by the design of the space, work activities can also pose serious safety hazards (heat, noise, vapors, etc.) that must be taken into account when identifying safety measures that must be taken.

Confined spaces are commonly encountered on ships, for examples spaces such as cofferdams, ballast tanks, fuel tanks and cargo tanks on oil tankers. Confined spaces with a hazardous atmosphere have resulted in numerous seafarer fatalities. For this reason, confined (enclosed space) regulations for atmosphere monitoring are stated in the SOLAS Convention and also specified in industry Codes, such as the Code of safe working practices.

=== Japan and South Korea ===
In Japan and South Korea, authorities have adopted definitions that highlight the oxygen-deficient nature of confined spaces. They define confined spaces as "oxygen deficient dangerous places" and operations in these spaces should be considered as having a permanent risk of oxygen depletion.

=== United Kingdom ===
In the United Kingdom, a confined space is defined by the Health and Safety Executive as one which is enclosed or largely enclosed, with a reasonably foreseeable risk to workers from fire, explosion, loss of consciousness, asphyxiation and drowning. The UK Confined Spaces Regulations 1997 sets out requirements for entry into confined spaces, including emergency arrangements.

=== United States ===
In the United States, entry into permit-required confined spaces must comply with regulations promulgated by the Occupational Safety and Health Administration (OSHA). These regulations include developing a written program, issuing entry permits, assigning attendant(s), designating entrants, and ensuring a means of rescue.

According to the OSHA, a permit-required confined space (permit space) has the three characteristics listed above (which define a confined space) and one or more of the following:

1. Contains or has the potential to contain a hazardous atmosphere
2. Contains a material that has the potential for engulfing the entrant
3. Has an internal configuration that might cause an entrant to be trapped or asphyxiated by inwardly converging walls or by a floor that slopes downward and tapers to a smaller cross section
4. Contains any other recognized serious safety or health hazards.

== Atmospheric hazards ==
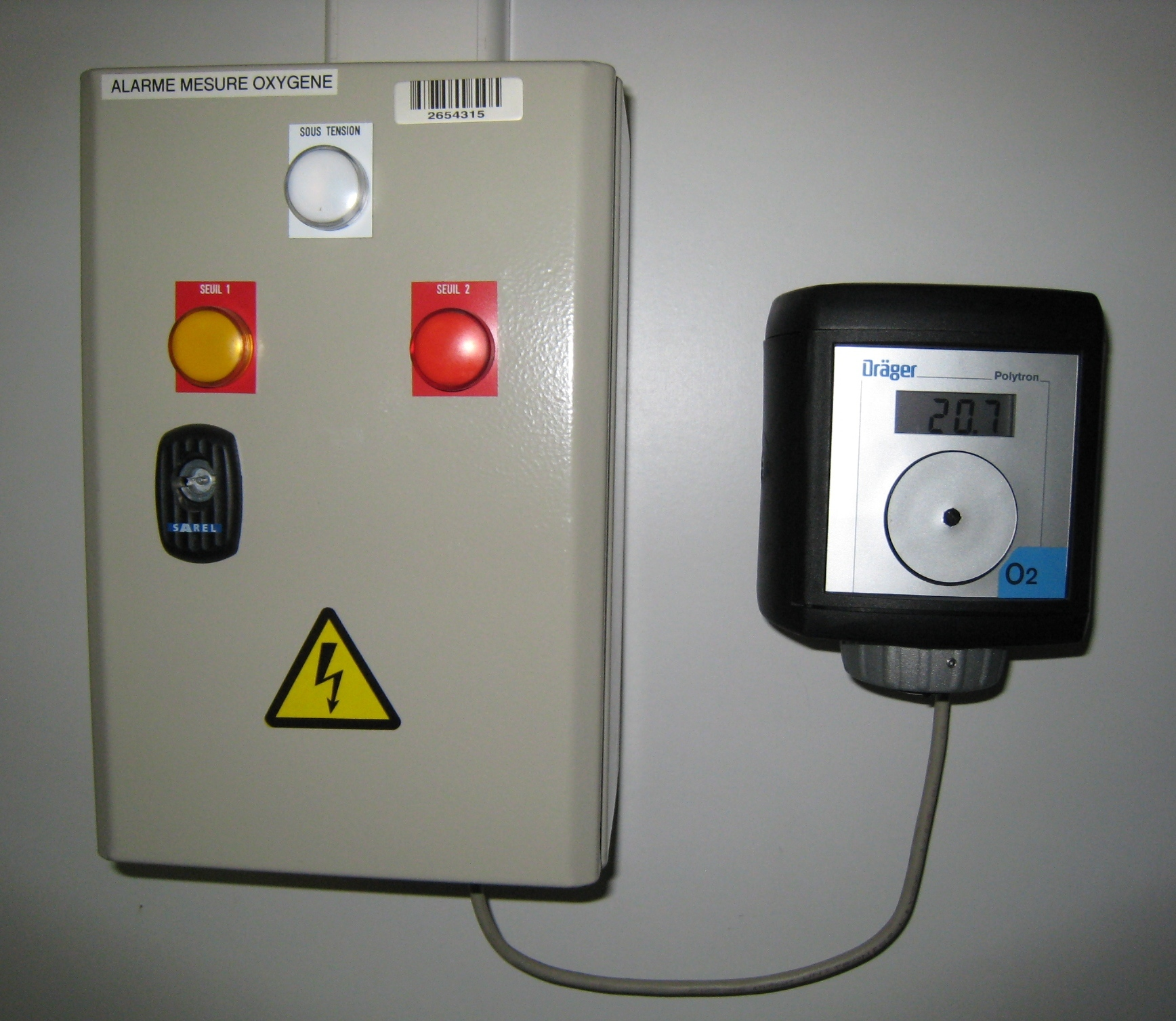
Fixed gas detector for monitoring atmosphere

The most common hazard seen in confined spaces is that of atmospheric hazards. These affect air quality and present immediate hazards to health or life. Acceptable atmospheric conditions must be verified before entry, and must be monitored continuously while the space is occupied. The oxygen concentration, the presence of toxic gases, and flammable material are the conditions that must be monitored. Toxic gases that are commonly expected and monitored for include carbon dioxide, carbon monoxide, hydrocarbon vapours (including benzene), ammonia and hydrogen sulfide.

According to OSHA, oxygen concentration is considered safe if it is between 19.5% and 23.5% of the total atmosphere. To protect against toxic gases, contaminants have permissible exposure limits (PELs), which are set by OSHA within the United States. Work also cannot continue if the concentration of a material reaches or exceeds 10% of its lower explosive limit.

Other countries and authorities use a variety of reference systems for acceptable levels for toxic gas exposure. These include Threshold Limit Values (TLV), Short Term Exposure Limits (STEL) and Workplace Exposure Limits (WEL). A Time Weighted Average (TWA) is defined as "where a person working in a zone for eight hours a day, five days a week, would not be expected to succumb to a TLV concentration if the average, after monitoring and calculation against the number of hours, was equal to or less than the current listed figure."

Even if a tank or similar vessel initially is tested and found to contain breathable air, a hazard can develop during operations inside the tank if residues inside the tank can release toxic gas or vapor when disturbed or if accidentally ignited. Steel water tanks may have dangerously low oxygen concentration when the interior rusts.

== Entry certification ==
In many situations, certification of non-hazardous atmosphere by a trained or competent person is required before personnel may enter a confined space without the use of a respirator. In the United States Navy, that person is the designated shipboard gas-free engineer. In the maritime sector an NFPA Certified Marine Chemist is required to perform testing in all confined spaces that have contained a flammable, combustible or toxic substance. Certification in civilian settings can be performed by any employee who is trained and authorized by the employer. The Entry Supervisor, under OSHA regulations, is designated by the employer and ensures that the space is safe to enter and all hazards are controlled.

Guidance provided by OSHA stresses the importance of establishing procedures focused on preventing unauthorised access. It states that temporary confined space barriers need to be fitted "promptly" once entrance covers are removed for access. This prevents unauthorised access, accidental falls into the space and foreign objects entering in.

In the United States, agricultural operations are exempted from regulations governing permit-required confined spaces (which is specific to general industry), but they are still required to identify and control confined space hazards.

== Injuries and fatalities ==
Injuries and fatalities involving confined spaces are frequent and often involve successive fatalities when would-be rescuers succumb to the same problem as the initial victim. In the 1980s, approximately 60% of fatalities involve would-be rescuers and more than 30% of fatalities occur in a space that has been tested and found to be safe to enter. One example was in 2006 at the decommissioned Sullivan Mine in British Columbia, Canada when one initial victim and then three rescuers all died.

Accidents in confined spaces present unique challenges and are often catastrophic, such as the Xcel Energy Cabin Creek Fire in 2007.

In 1999, North West OHS released a study of confined space fatalities based on reports from the Occupational Safety and Health Administration (OSHA), National Institute of Occupational Safety Health (NIOSH) and the Mines Safety and Health Administration (MSHA) with a breakdown of their causes. Researchers believe that the following numbers are only a fraction of the fatal confined space accidents that actually occurred as many locations are not initially identified as confined spaces, OSHA reports did not include non-hazardous confined space fatalities in their studies prior to 1982, NIOSH still do not include non-hazardous confined space fatalities in their studies and many American states do not note the presence of confined spaces in fatality reports submitted to OSHA.

- Fire and Explosion (OSHA 1982a): 50 confined space incidents from 1974 to 1979 with 76 fatalities. The majority of incidents were caused by worker error or faulty equipment.
- Lockout-tagout (OSHA 1982b): 83 confined space incidents from 1974 to 1980 with 83 fatalities. This category covers conveyor belts and machinery on the factory floor etc. that are not generally considered confined spaces, but which satisfy the criteria for a confined space.
- Grain Handling (OSHA 1983): 105 confined space incidents from 1977 to 1981 with 126 fatalities.
- Toxic and Asphyxiating Atmospheres (OSHA 1985): 122 confined space incidents from 1974 to 1982 with 173 fatalities.
- Welding and Cutting (OSHA 1988): 217 incidents from 1974 to 1985 with 262 fatalities. OSHA reports of welding and cutting deaths do not record whether or not an incident has occurred in a confined space, it is estimated that 22% of the incidents were in a confined space.
- Shipbuilding & Repair (OSHA 1990): 151 incidents from 1974 to 1984 with 176 fatalities. OSHA reports of shipbuilding deaths do not record whether or not an incident has occurred in a confined space, it is estimated that 36% of the incidents were in a confined space.
- Mining (MSHA Report 1988): 38 confined space incidents from 1980 to 1986 with 44 fatalities.

According to data collected by the U.S. Department of Labor, Bureau of Labor Statistics, Census of Fatal Occupational Injuries program, fatal injuries in confined spaces fluctuated from a low of 81 in 1998 to a high of 100 in 2000 during the five-year period, averaging 92 fatalities per year.

== Rescue ==
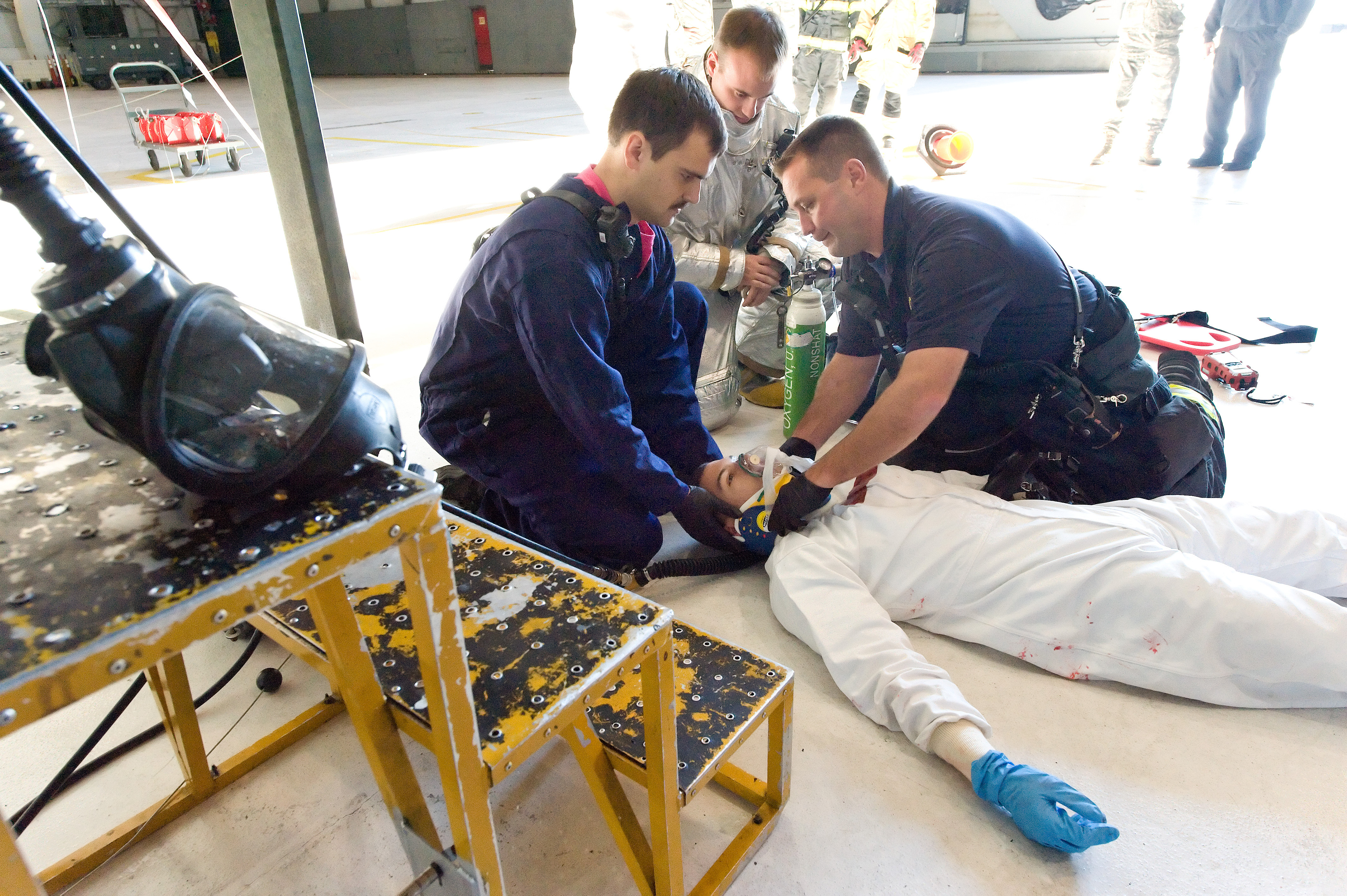
A USAF confined space rescue exercise

Where a system of entry permits is in place, a rescue plan is required, which includes a trained and equipped rescue team available within a reasonable response time. It will list the personnel and equipment required to be at the worksite before entry is allowed. Special equipment such as tripod hoists, harnesses, and others may be required to extricate a worker from a toxic environment, without unduly endangering rescue personnel. In some industrial plants, Working at Height (WAH) and Confined Space (CS) rescue services are combined and delivered together.

== See also ==
- Heat stroke – Condition caused by excessive exposure to high temperatures
- Mine rescue – Rescue of persons trapped after mining accidents
