= West Metro Fire Rescue =

Colorado fire department

Operational area
- Country: United States
- State: Colorado
- Counties: Douglas and Jefferson counties

Agency overview
- Established: 1995
- Annual calls: 34,222 (2018)
- Fire chief: Jeremy Metz
- IAFF: 1309

Facilities and equipment
- Stations: 17
- Engines: 15
- Platforms: 3
- Rescues: 1
- Ambulances: 15
- HAZMAT: 2
- USAR: 1
- Wildland: 7
- Rescue boats: 1
- Light and air: 1

Website
- Official website
- IAFF website

West Metro Fire Rescue provides fire protection and emergency medical services to communities in Douglas and Jefferson counties in Colorado. The district is located within the Denver metropolitan area. The department is also the sponsoring agency for the Urban Search and Rescue Colorado Task Force 1, housed at West Metro's Training Center. In 2018, the department responded to 34,222 calls for service.

The rank structure for this department looks like this:

• Fire Chief

• Deputy Fire Chief of Operations

• Deputy Fire Chief of Administration

• Deputy Fire Chief of Life Safety

• Assistant Fire Chief

• Battalion Chief

• Captain

• Lieutenant

• Engineer

• Firefighter

• Probationary Firefighter

• Recruit

== History ==
The district was established in 1995 following the merger of the Lakewood Fire Protection District and the Bancroft Fire Protection District.

In April 2016, the district grew with the absorption of the Wheat Ridge Fire Department into West Metro.

== Stations and apparatus ==
As of 2020, the district operates from the following 17 stations located throughout its service area.

Fire Station	Location	Engine company	Truck company	EMS unit	Other units
1	6401 West 14th Avenue, Lakewood	Engine 1		Medic 1 Medic 11	SAM 1
2	1545 Robb Street, Lakewood	Engine 2	Tower 2		HAZ-MAT 1
3	95 Garrison Street, Lakewood	Engine 3		Medic 2 Medic 3	
4	13155 West Alameda Parkway, Lakewood	Engine 4		Medic 4	District Chief 2 Brush 4
5	14055 West 20th Avenue, Golden	Engine 5		Medic 5	HAZ-MAT 5
6	15100 West Sixth Avenue, Golden	Engine 6			Tender 6
7	6315 Mississippi Avenue, Lakewood	Engine 7		Medic 7	ARM 1
8	9001 West Jewell Avenue, Lakewood	Engine 8	Tower 8	Medic 8	Boat 8
8	Storage station with same location				DIVE 2 Support 8 Boat 8
9	101 Red Rocks Business Drive, Morrison	Engine 9			Brush 9 Brush 39 UTV 9
10	3535 South Kipling Street, Lakewood		Rescue 10	Medic 10 Medic 19	ATV 2 Collapse Rescue 10 SAM 2 Bureau 7 Rehab / MCI unit Technical rescue trailer
11	15629 West Belleview Avenue, Morrison	Engine 11			Brush Engine 11
12	9990 West Alamo Place, Littleton	Engine 12		Medic 12	
13	12613 West Indore Place, Littleton	Engine 13		Medic 13	Brush 13
14	10305 West Chatfield Avenue, Littleton		Truck 14		District Chief 3 Rescue 14 AIR 14
15	6220 North Roxborough Park Road	Engine 15		Medic 15	Brush 15
16	3880 Upham Street, Wheat Ridge	Engine 16		Medic 16	District Chief 1
17	10901 West 38th Avenue, Wheat Ridge	Engine 17		Medic 17	Brush 17 Swift Water Rescue 17
