= Coulombi egg tanker =

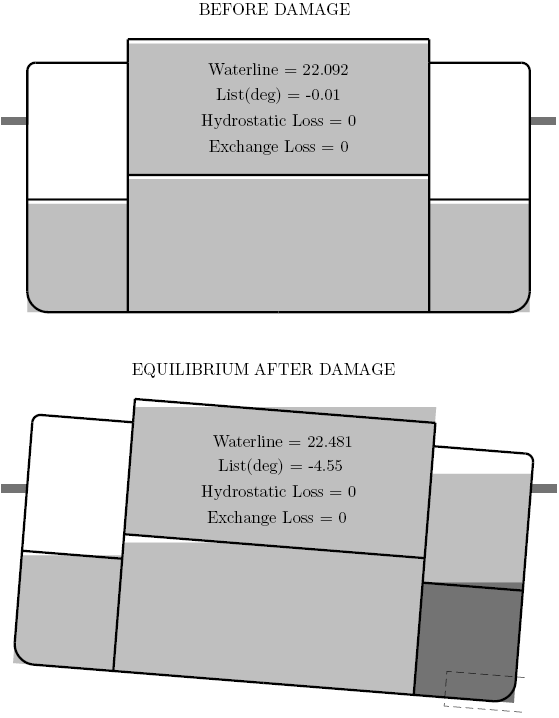
Coulombi Egg, damage up 3 m. Light gray is oil, dark gray is seawater.

The Coulombi egg tanker is a design that is aimed at reducing oil spills. It was approved by the International Maritime Organization (IMO) as an alternative to the double hull concept. The United States Coast Guard does not allow this design to enter US waters, effectively preventing it from being built.

== Concept ==
The design is an enhanced mid-deck tanker and consists of a series of centre and wing tanks that are divided by horizontal bulkheads. The upper wing tanks form ballast tanks and act as emergency receiver tanks for cargo should the lower tanks be fractured. The lower tanks are connected to these ballast tanks by non-return valves.

When a lower tank is damaged, the incoming sea water pushes the oil in the damaged tank up into the ballast tank. Because of the hydrostatic pressure, there is an automatic transfer out of the damaged tank.

== Advantages ==
The double-hull design is aimed at the probability of zero outflow. In low energy collisions where only the outside hull is penetrated, this will be the case. However, in high energy collisions both hulls are penetrated. As the tanks of a double hull tanker are larger than those of MARPOL tankers and pre-MARPOL tankers and the height of the cargo above the water line is higher, the resulting spill can be much larger than these single hull designs. In the Coulombi egg design spillage is greatly reduced, possibly to zero.

Where a double hull VLCC has a ballast tank coated area of about 225,000 m³, in a Coulombi egg tanker this area is reduced to 66,000 m³. This reduces maintenance and corrosion risks, which otherwise may result in structural failure, as was the case with the Erika and Prestige.

== Bibliography ==
- Devanney, Jack (2006). The Tankship Tromedy: The Impending Disasters in Tankers (PDF). Tavernier, FL: CTX Press. pp. 379–83. ISBN 0-9776479-0-0. Archived from the original on July 8, 2008.
