= Hydraulic tanker =

Type of vessel

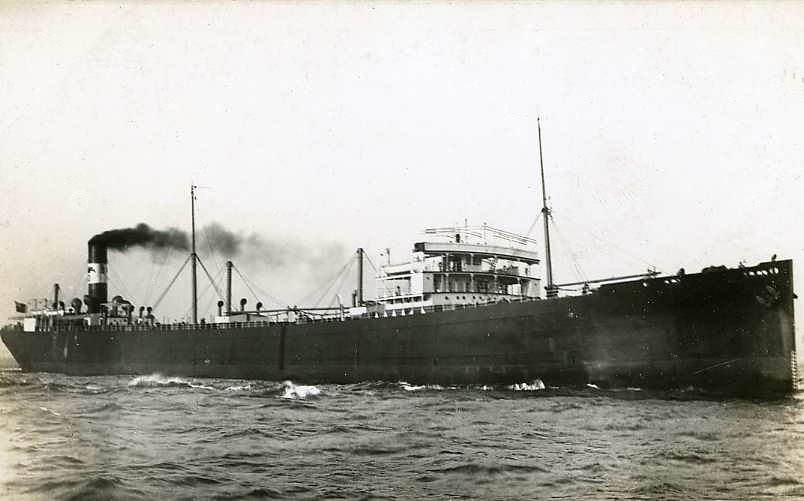
The tanker San Nazario

A hydraulic tanker is an oil tanker designed to use water as an incompressible fluid for loading and unloading petroleum cargo. Each cargo tank is kept full at all times so oil floating on water will be pressed against the top of the tank. A cargo tank initially filled with water is loaded with the desired quantity of oil by pumping oil into the top of the tank displacing water which overflows through an opening at the bottom of the tank. The cargo tank is unloaded by removing oil from the top of the tank as water is admitted at the bottom.

== Theory ==
Hydraulic tanker design bases:

- Oil is lighter than water.
- Oil and water will not mix in a full tank.
- Water is an inexpensively available hydraulic fluid.
- Absence of air space prevents formation of explosive gas mixtures.

== Advantages ==
Oil pumps located on an upper deck avoid dangerous volatile hydrocarbon accumulations in pump rooms near the bottom of a ship. Ship stability is improved by eliminating free surface in partially filled tanks. Ship structural stresses are reduced by eliminating dynamic loading caused by sloshing of fluids in partially filled tanks. Avoiding exposure to atmospheric oxygen reduces corrosion within the tank, and reduces hardening of residual crude oil deposits remaining after unloading.

== Disadvantages ==
The hydraulic system is ineffective with heavy or viscous oils and not recommended for greater than 15-degree Baumé. Heating coils must be placed near the top of tanks, where they are less efficient. An hydraulic tanker requires a larger volume of void space for buoyancy than conventionally loaded tanks, because the empty, or ballasted, condition of tanks filled with water is heavier than the loaded condition of tanks filled with oil. A heavier ballasted condition may also increase round trip fuel consumption.

Many petroleum compounds have limited solubility in water. Low solubility is typically of negligible concern with respect to product loss, but discharge water can contribute to oil pollution. Pollution levels may be insignificant where navigable waters contain elevated background levels of petroleum products; and the advantages make hydraulic tankers useful oil spill recovery ships when their storage tanks may act as oil–water separators.

== Sources ==
- Manning, George Charles (1930). Manual of Naval Architecture. New York: D. Van Nostrand Company.
- Morrell, Robert W. (1931). Oil Tankers (Second ed.). New York: Simmons-Boardman Publishing Company.
