= Urban Search and Rescue Colorado Task Force 1 =

FEMA Urban Search and Rescue Task Force based in Douglas and Jefferson County, Colorado

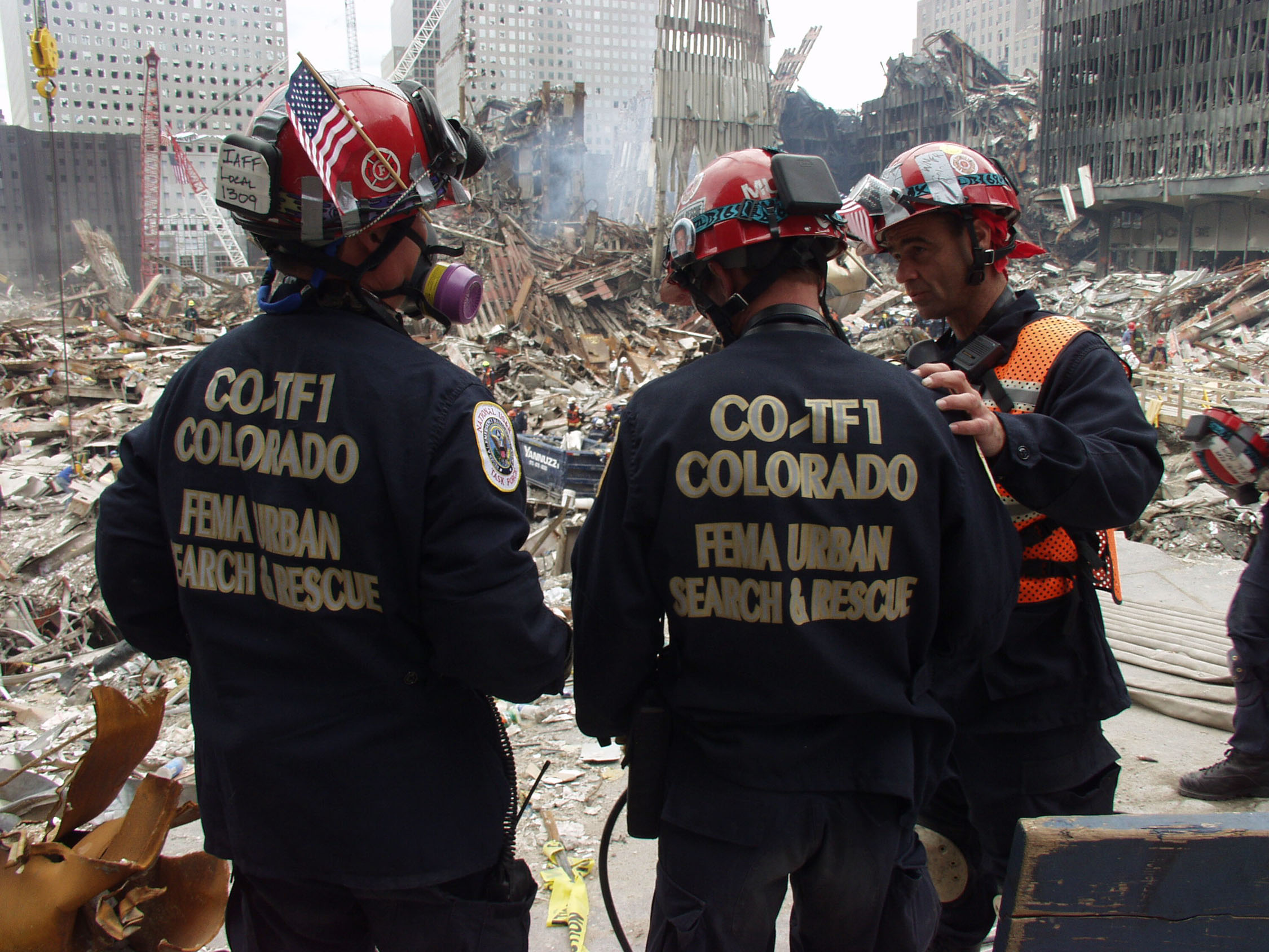
CO-TF1 at World Trade Center after the 9/11 attacks.

Urban Search and Rescue Colorado Task Force 1 (CO-TF1) is a FEMA Urban Search and Rescue Task Force based in Colorado. They were one of the 20 FEMA Urban Search and Rescue Task Force teams deployed to the World Trade Center site after the September 11, 2001 attacks. The task force is sponsored by the West Metro Fire Protection District and is made up of 70 positions with over 200 trained members including firefighters, paramedics, engineers and canine handlers.

== Deployments ==
As of September 2018 CO-TF1 has taken part in the following deployments:

- Hurricane Florence - Raleigh, NC (September 2018)
- Hurricane Harvey - Houston, Texas (August/September 2017)
- Lower North Fork Fire 2012
- Hurricane Irene - (August 2011)
- Hurricane Ike - Houston, Texas (August/September 2008)
- Hurricane Gustav - Houston, Texas (August 2008)
- Windsor Tornado - Windsor, Colorado (May 2008)
- Pueblo Gas Explosion - Pueblo, Colorado (November 2008)
- Crowley County Fire 2008
- Greensburg, Kansas Tornado (May 2007
- Hurricane Ernesto - Jacksonville, Florida (August 2006)
- Hurricane Katrina - New Orleans, Louisiana (August 2005)
- Hurricane Rita - (September 2005)
- Hurricane Ophelia - (September 2005)
- Hurricane Isabel - (September 2004)
- Hurricane Charley - (August 2004)
- Hurricane Frances - Jacksonville, Florida (September 2004)
- Space Shuttle Columbia disaster - (February 2003)
- World Trade Center Attack - New York, New York (September 2001)
- Ft. Collins Floods in 1997.
- Oklahoma City bombing - Oklahoma City, Oklahoma (April 1995)
