= Mid-deck tanker =

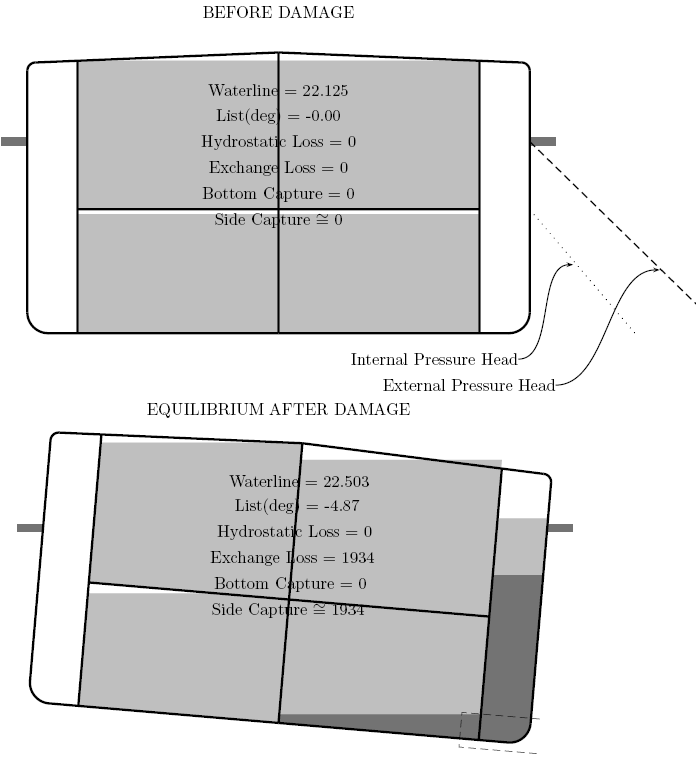
Mid-Deck Tanker, damage up 3 m. Light gray is oil, dark gray is seawater.

A mid-deck oil tanker is a tanker design which includes an additional deck intended to limit spills if the tanker is damaged. The extra deck is placed at about the middle of the draft of the ship. This design is an alternative to the double-hull tanker design, and is superior in terms of spill volume.

Although double-hull design is superior in low energy casualties and prevents spillage in small casualties, in high energy casualties where both hulls are breached, oil can spill through the double-hull and into the sea. In grounding events of this type, a mid-deck design overcomes this by eliminating the double-bottom compartments that are void with air. Since the density of seawater is greater than that of oil, water comes into the tanks instead of oil escaping out, and rather than spilling, oil is vented upwards into overflow tanks.

A variation on the mid-deck tanker is the Coulombi Egg Tanker, which was approved by IMO as an alternative to the double hull concept. The United States Coast Guard does not allow this design to enter US waters, effectively preventing it from being built, although it is superior to the double hull in high energy casualties.
