= Marine transfer operations =

Transfer of liquid cargo between ships

Marine Transfer Operations (MTO) are conducted at ports worldwide to move liquid cargoes, including petroleum products, between tanker ships, barges, and marine terminals. Once a vessel is securely moored, a transfer connection (either a rigid loading arm or a flexible hose) is established between the shore’s valve header and the vessel’s manifold.

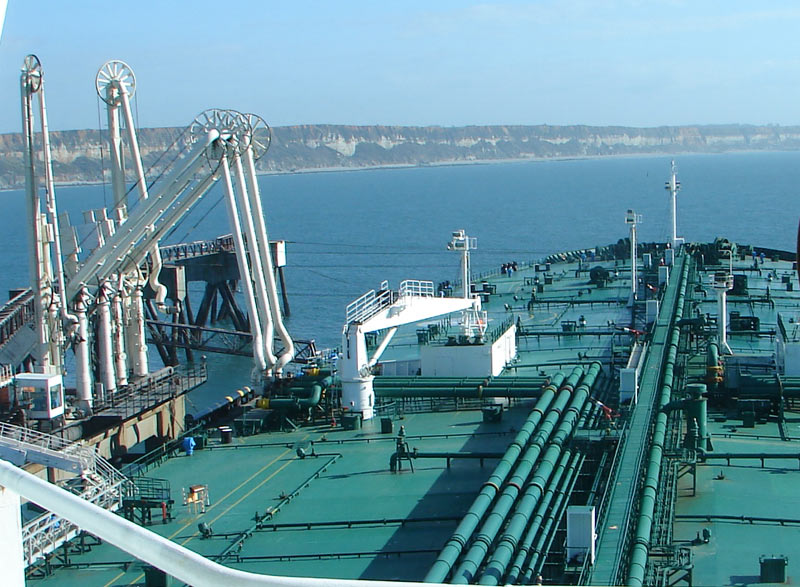
Tanker ship arriving at a Marine Terminal.

== Person-in-charge ==
The transfer of petroleum products and other hazardous liquids must be supervised by qualified personnel both on the vessel and on the shore. The vessel’s Person-in-Charge (PIC) is responsible for the safe operation of the transfer on board, while the shore PIC oversees operations at the terminal. The person-in-charge on the dock is called a Loading master-PIC and the person-in charge on the barge will be the Tankerman-PIC. The person-in-charge on a tanker ship will be the deck officer who monitors the transfer of product in the cargo control room. Qualification requirements for these personnel vary by jurisdiction, but internationally recognized standards, such as those established by the International Maritime Organization (IMO), require training and certification appropriate to the type of cargo being handled.

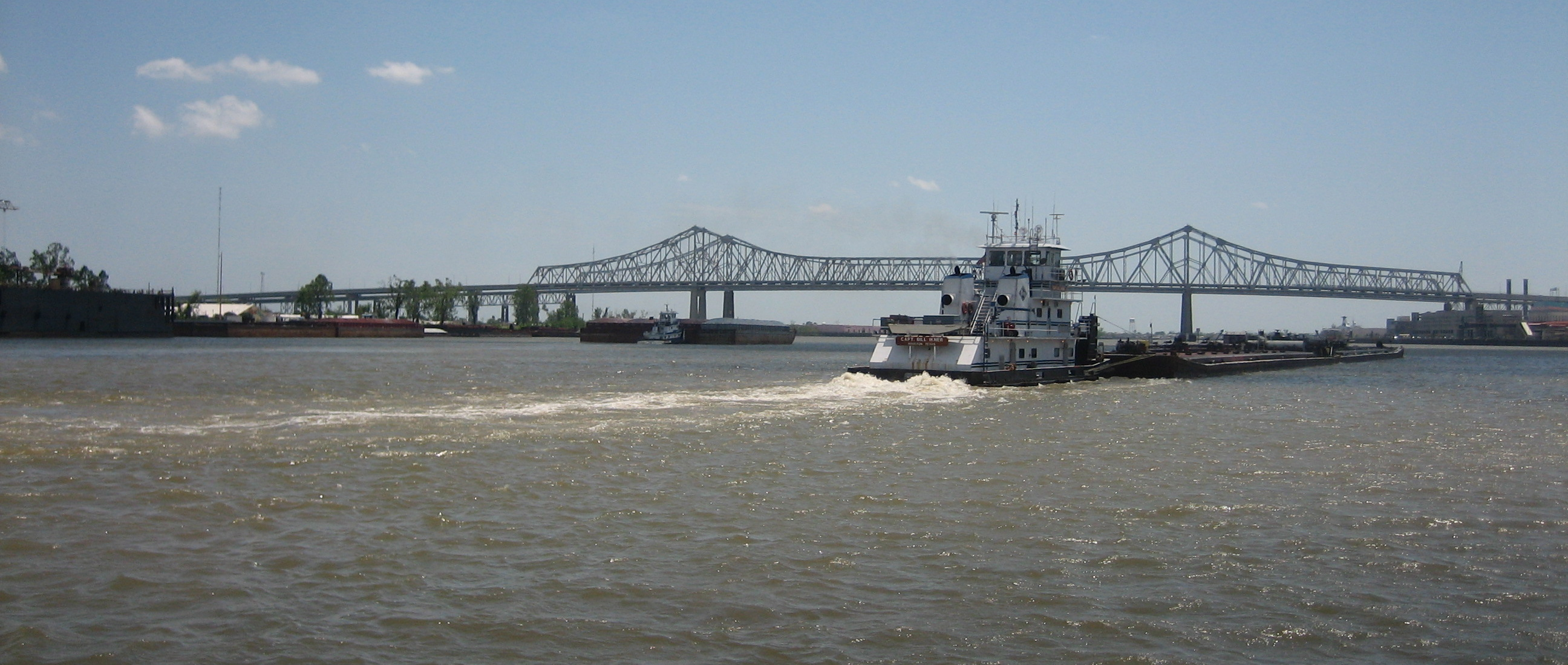
Inland Tug and Barge

== Marine surveyor ==
Loading Masters work closely with the marine surveyor in agreeing to the sequence of the transfer. Such as whether any product sampling will take place prior to commencement, determining if a line displacement will occur, agreeing on whether the final stop at completion will either be a shore stop or a draft stop on the vessel. The marine surveyor gauges the vessel's tanks and shore tanks to ensure the correct amount of product is transferred. Additionally, the surveyor or inspector will obtain product samples on the marine vessel and shore tank for laboratory analysis to ensure that the product meets all specifications of purity.

== Regulations ==
Transfer operations and commencement of a transfer is highly regulated throughout the world with consideration of the environment with potential of water pollution occurring if petroleum product is released into the water during the transfer. Federal, state, and local laws must be observed during marine transfer operations.

Maritime Security (USCG), occupational safety and health regulations must be adhered to in addition to environmental regulations during marine transfer operations. These regulation's are enforced by local state port control organizations such as the United States Coast Guard in the United States.

== Marine transfer operators ==
A marine transfer operation occurs between three main stakeholders which includes the Loading Master-PIC, Vessel Person-In -Charge PIC, and marine surveyor or inspector. These individuals communicate prior to the transfer agreeing on the sequence of events that will occur before, during, and after the transfer. During the course of the transfer the Loading Master is in continuous two way radio contact with the vessel Person-In-Charge and standing by to stop the transfer immediately if any problems develop such as leaks at the transfer hose or loading arm.

== See also ==
- Barge
- Tanker
- Oil tanker
- Marine loading arm
