= Loading master =

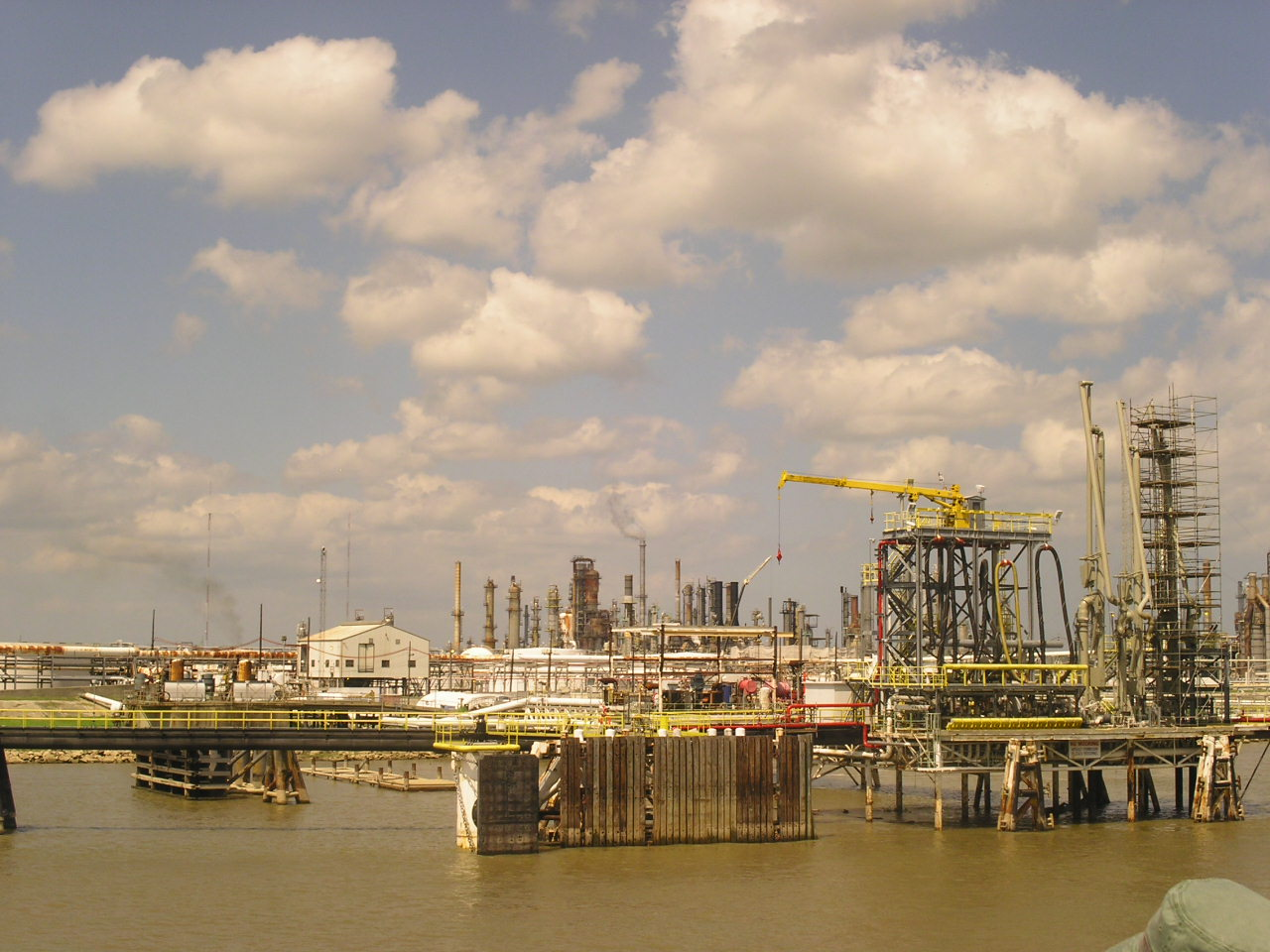
Marine terminal awaiting vessel arrival at the dock.

The loading master person-in-charge (PIC) is the marine transfer operator at the marine terminal who supervises the movement of petroleum products between tanker ships, barges, FPSOs and the terminal while the vessel is berthed at the dock. In this capacity the marine transfer operator ensures that all regulatory aspects concerning protection of the environment and maritime security are adhered to during marine transfer operations. Of particular importance is ensuring no water pollution occurs from a spill or a breach of security from the access of unauthorized personnel. They typically act as the terminal's representative and complete a safety checklist with the ship's officer prior to and during loading.

== Loading master-PIC duties ==
Additional duties include communicating with the vessel person-in-charge utilizing a portable intrinsically safe two-way radio, spotting the vessel during arrival to ensure the vessel headers are lined up with the dock header, secure and proper placement of the gangway, operating the dock crane while positioning the transfer hose from the dock to the vessel, assisting in connecting the transfer hose or loading arm to the vessel product manifold, and during the transfer monitoring the movement on a regular basis maintaining an hourly log.

== Transfer specifications ==
Loading masters work closely with the marine surveyor in agreeing to the sequence of the transfer. Such as whether any product sampling will take place prior to commencement, determining if a line displacement will occur, agreeing on whether the final stop at completion will either be a shore stop or a draft stop on the vessel. The marine surveyor gauges the vessel's tanks and shore tanks to ensure the correct amount of product is transferred. Additionally, the surveyor or inspector will obtain product samples on the marine vessel and shore tank for laboratory analysis to ensure that the product meets all specifications of purity.

== Pre-transfer conference ==
Of extreme importance in the duties of the loading master-PIC is continuous radio communication with the vessel person-in-charge who will be a Tankerman-PIC if transferring with a barge or a deck officer of the Merchant Marine if the transfer is with a tanker ship. Prior to product moving between the vessel and marine terminal a pre-transfer conference occurs between these marine transfer operators. This conference highlights the particulars of the transfer such as product identity, hazards of the product, rate of flow during the transfer, estimated completion times, maritime security procedures in place, discharge containment and emergency response procedures, and finally any notifications to the marine surveyor that need to be made prior to completion.

== Marine transfer operators ==
A marine transfer operation occurs between three main stakeholders which includes the loading master-PIC, vessel-PIC, and marine surveyor or inspector. These individuals communicate prior to the transfer agreeing on the sequence of events that will occur before, during, and after the transfer. During the course of the transfer the loading master is in continuous two way radio contact with the vessel person-in-charge and standing by to stop the transfer immediately if any problems develop such as leaks at the transfer hose or loading arm.

== Other industries ==
Every commercial cargo or passenger operation requires someone to supervise the loading of ships, ferries, trucks, aircraft and so on.

== See also ==
- Loadmaster, a similar role at airports
