= EMCO Wheaton =

Manufacturing company

- Industry: Gas and oil
- Founded: London, Ontario, Canada (1906)
- Number of locations: Manufacturing plants in: Houston, Texas; Oakville, Ontario, Canada; Kirchhain, Germany and Margate, United Kingdom
- Area served: Worldwide
- Key people: Vicente Reynal (CEO and Chairman of parent company Ingersoll Rand)
- Number of employees: 101~1000
- Website: Emco Wheaton

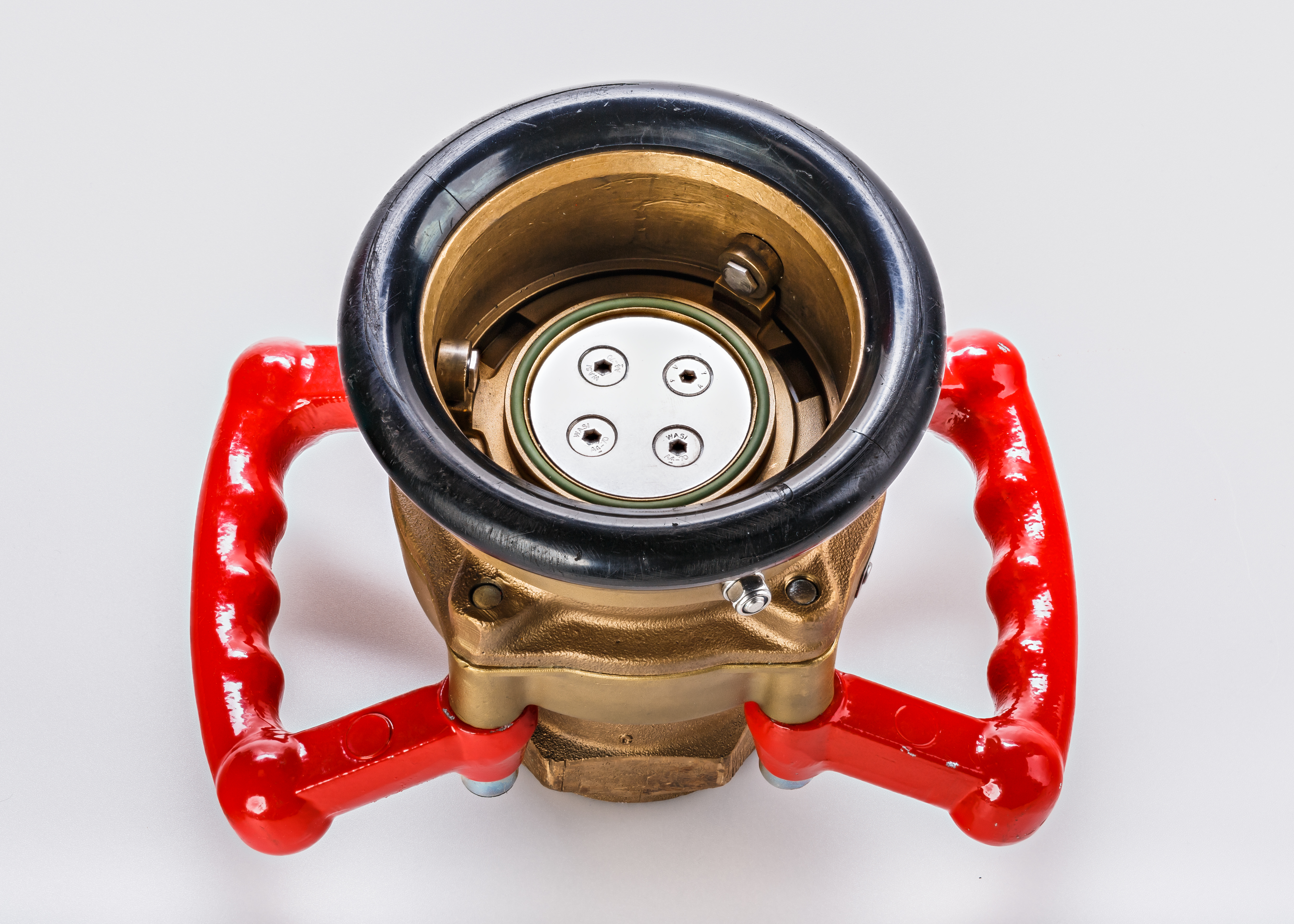
A Tody-Matic Dry Break, one of the products of the EMCO Wheaton portfolio.

EMCO Wheaton is a multinational manufacturing company headquartered in the United Kingdom and Germany. It makes fuelling systems, as well as fluid loading and unloading products for oil and gas, chemical, fuel, and food and beverages. The company is one of four strategic brands that form part of the parent company Ingersoll Rand Transport Solutions. It works across a wide range of different sectors, including road, rail, marine and aviation. It is the largest loading and unloading arms manufacturer in the world and has representation in more than 110 countries.

== History ==
EMCO Wheaton’s roots stretch back more than 130 years, with the creation of two separate companies. The first was Wheaton Petroleum Valves, founded in Newark, New Jersey in 1892; the second was The Empire Manufacturing Company, established in London, Ontario in 1903. Upon incorporation in 1906, The Empire Manufacturing Company changed its name to EMCO Brass and in 1927 entered into an exclusive licensee arrangement with Wheaton Petroleum Valves, creating ‘EMCO Wheaton’ for the first time.

In 1949, EMCO Brass Limited was set up in Croydon, in what is now a part of Greater London. This plant manufactured Wheaton petroleum valves under licence and was the first subsidiary to be established outside of North America. The Croydon plant soon proved too small and the company was relocated to Margate, Kent in 1952, where the company can be found today.

In 1965, EMCO Wheaton acquired Buckeye Iron and Brass Works, based in Dayton, Ohio. The company manufactured nozzles, dry-break couplings and underwing aircraft refuelling couplers. Finally, in 1967 all outstanding Wheaton shares were purchased by EMCO Limited, bringing all three major brands – EMCO, Wheaton and Buckeye – under single ownership.

In September 1995, EMCO Wheaton’s distribution, transportation and marine business was sold to Syltone – a UK-based company. Syltone introduced a manufacturing consolidation programme, which ceased production of loading arms at Margate. EMCO Wheaton UK became the hub company for tank truck equipment, while EMCO Wheaton GmbH, in Kirchhain, Germany became the hub company for marine loading arms.

In January 2004, Illinois-based Gardner Denver acquired Syltone and the EMCO Wheaton businesses were consolidated. Gardner Denver positioned the brands within its energy and infrastructure group, where they remain to this day. Later on in 2006, TODO was added to the EMCO Wheaton portfolio, strengthening the company’s offering with the addition of premium couplings and adapters.

In 2013, global investment firm KKR purchased Gardner Denver. The company continues to support EMCO Wheaton.

In early 2020, Gardner Denver merged with Ingersoll Rand. In 2021, Ingersoll Rand Transport Solutions was established as the parent organisation for four strategic brands: EMCO Wheaton, TODO, GHH Rand Transport and Gardner Denver Transport.

== Products ==
=== Fuelling Systems ===
EMCO Wheaton manufactures road tanker loading and unloading systems, dry-break and API Couplers, adapters and a variety of aviation and industrial nozzles for refuelling systems, including:

• Automatic hot refuelling nozzles

• Over-wing fuelling nozzles

• POSILOCK 105 fuelling system

• POSI/LOCK-BLUE UREA dispensing system

• Off-road automatic fuelling system

The company also produces tank truck systems and components, including fuel metering for domestic deliveries.

=== Loading Systems ===
Specialising in loading arms, EMCO Wheaton manufactures systems for the loading and unloading of product for ships, ISO containers, rail cars and tank trucks. Products in this range include:

• Marines loading arms

• Top and bottom loading arms

• Speciality arms

• Access equipment and swivel joints

== Locations ==
EMCO Wheaton has manufacturing facilities and regional sales offices around the world. These include:

• Asia-Pacific: China, Hong Kong, India, South Korea, Singapore, Indonesia, Malaysia, Taiwan, Thailand, Australia, New Zealand

• Middle East: Bahrain, UAE

• Europe: Germany, Austria, Belgium, Czechia, Finland, France, Netherlands, UK, Italy, Poland, Slovakia, Spain, Sweden, Switzerland

• Americas: USA, Canada, Brazil, Argentina

• Africa: South Africa

== See also ==
- Gardner Denver Inc.
- Ingersoll Rand
