= Cargo control room =

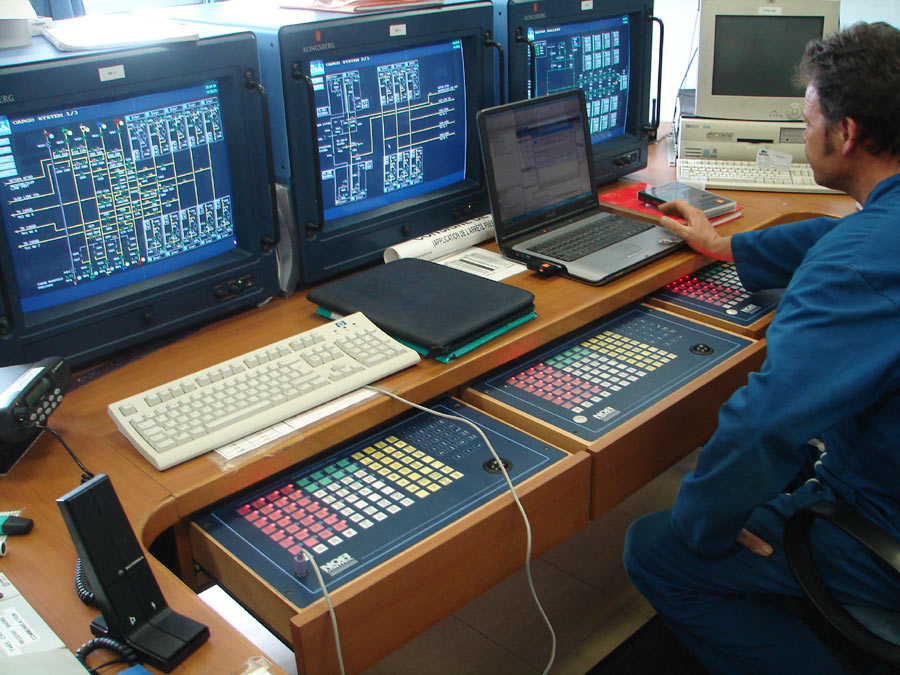
A modern CCR gives the PIC access to numerous monitoring and control systems

The cargo control room, CCR, or cargo office of a tankship is where the person in charge (PIC) can monitor and control the loading and unloading of the ship's liquid cargo. Prevalent on automated vessels, the CCR may be in its own room, or located on the ship's bridge. Among other things, the equipment in the CCR may allow the person in charge to control cargo and stripping pumps, control and monitor valve positions, and monitor cargo tank liquid levels.

== History ==
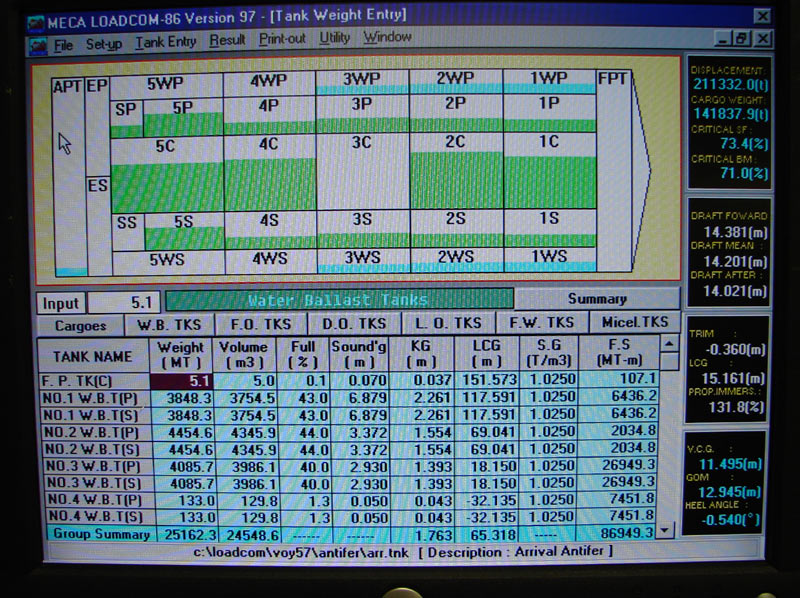
Many systems allow the PIC to monitor the ballast system and ship's stability during load and discharge

Cargo control rooms began to appear on U.S.-flag tankers in the mid-1960s. Prior to this time, valves were operated manually on deck by reach rods and liquid levels were monitored by a roving watch consisting of the mate and seamen on watch. The use of computers in the cargo control room began in the 1980s. As technology developed, computerized systems began to centralize tasks such as cargo control per se, tank level monitoring, and real-time computation of hull stress information in the cargo control room.

== Characteristics ==
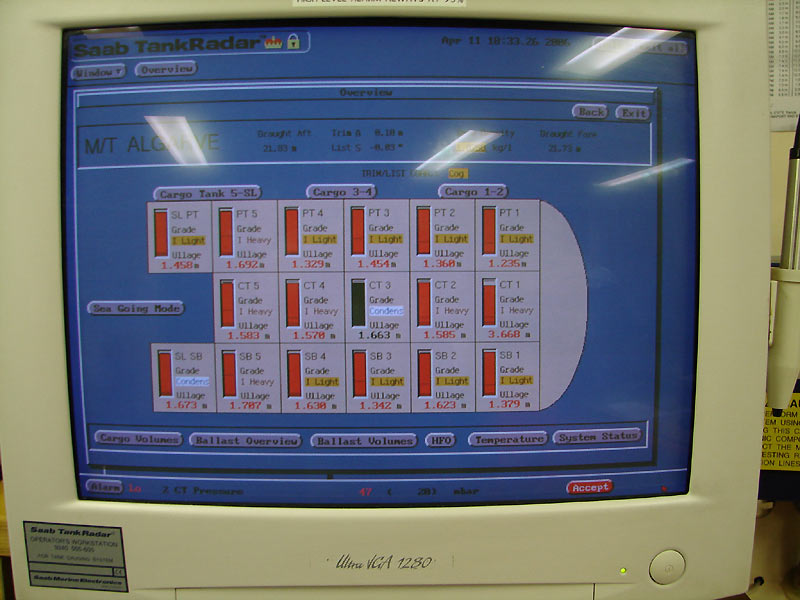
Schematic showing various cargoes loaded, trim, and list.

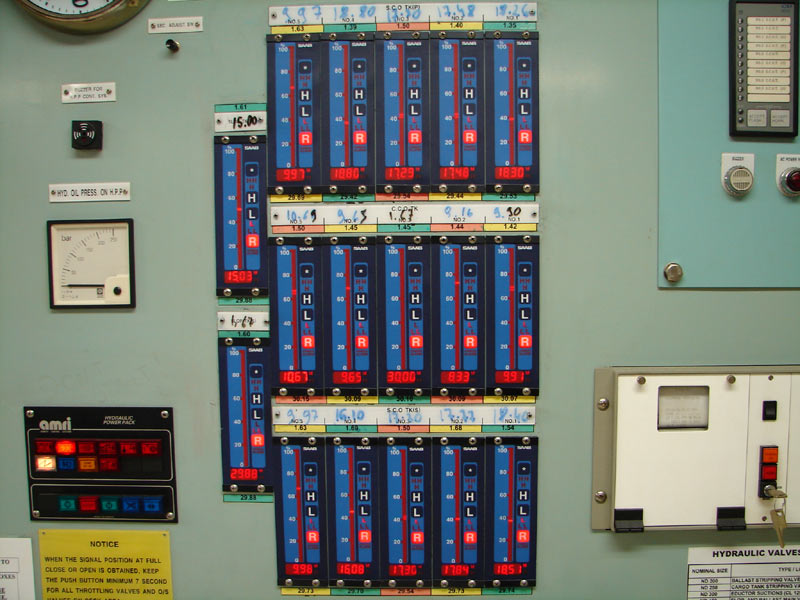
Monitoring systems that do not use computers are still often seen

The design and layout of an individual cargo control room is determined by the ship's design, owner's requirements and the capabilities of the shipyard in which the ship is built. Modern cargo control rooms offer some or all of these components: main cargo pump and stripping pump control, valve control, tank level monitoring, and auxiliary functions.

Main cargo pumps and stripping pumps are used to discharge cargo from the ship. From the cargo control room, the person in charge of the discharge can typically turn pumps on and off, set pump speeds, and monitor pipeline pressures on the suction- and discharge-sides of pumps.

By actuating cargo valves, the person in charge can control where cargo is pumped from, where it is pumped to, and in systems that use throttle valves, can control the relative flow rates of cargo through the valves. Modern cargo control rooms allow the person in charge to remotely control some or all of the valves in the cargo system and monitor the state of all valves. Valve indicators are typically laid out on a "mimic panel" which displays the cargo system piping, valves and pumps in a schematic diagram.

Tank level monitoring is another key functionality often provided in modern cargo control rooms. One aspect of tank level monitoring is overfill alarms, which sound throughout the ship when cargo levels exceed the ship's design specifications. Many systems allow the person in charge to monitor tank levels at all tank levels. Tank level monitoring allows the person in charge to take early action to avoid oil spills, especially when loading the ship. Tank level information is often sent to computers that calculate hull stresses such as shear forces and bending moments.

Various other functions are available in some cargo control rooms. Many offer the person in charge additional monitoring and control systems, the ability to monitor inert gas systems, and tank pressures. Modern cargo control rooms typically allow the person in charge to control ballast pumps and valves, and monitor oil content of ballast water by the use of oily water separators. In cases where ships carry specialty products, specialized monitoring systems are available in the cargo control room.

== See also ==
- Oil tanker
- Chemical tanker
