= Loadmaster =

Aircrew member who manages flight cargo

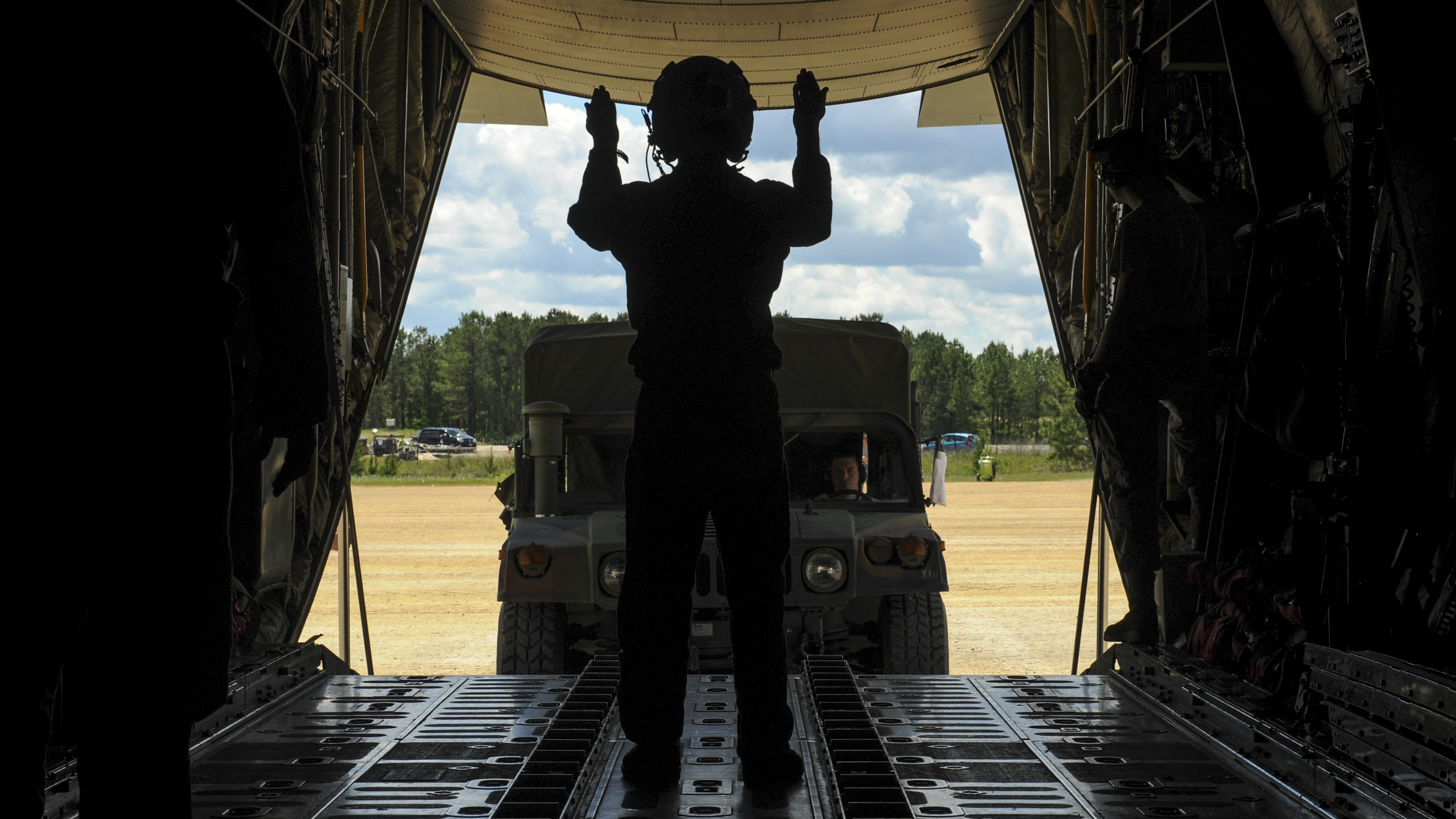
A Royal Australian Air Force loadmaster directing a vehicle onto a C-130J Hercules in 2016

A loadmaster is an aircrew member on military transport aircraft or civilian aircraft (with cargo ramp) tasked with the safe loading, transport and unloading of aerial cargoes. Loadmasters serve in the militaries and civilian airlines of many nations.

== Duties ==
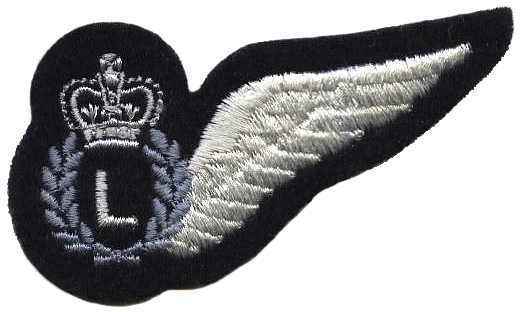
Royal Australian Air Force Brevet

Australian Army Loadmaster Brevet

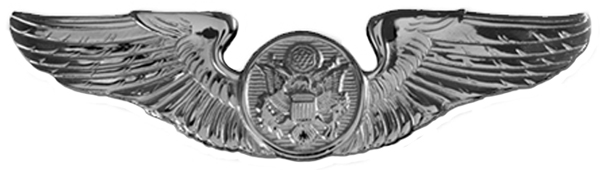
USAF Enlisted Aircrew Badge

The loadmaster performs the calculations and plans cargo and passenger placement so that the weight distribution is within permissible center of gravity limits for the aircraft throughout the flight. Loadmasters ensure cargo is placed on the aircraft in such a way as to prevent overloading sensitive sections of the airframe and cargo floor. Considerations are also given to civilian and military regulations which may prohibit the placement of one type of cargo in proximity to another. Unusual cargo may require special equipment to be loaded safely aboard the aircraft, limiting where the other cargo may feasibly be placed. Tactically, loadmasters may also directly affect combat readiness as they are also responsible for determining the load order of aircraft so that more tactically important material (e.g. ammunition) is off-loaded first and therefore ready to deploy faster than other support items; this may be especially important to forward operating bases.

The loadmaster may physically load the aircraft, but primarily supervises loading crews and procedures. Once positioned aboard the aircraft, the loadmaster ensures that their charge is properly secured, as an unexpected shift of the load can produce serious handling problems for the aircraft. Chains, straps, and integrated cargo locks are among the most common tools used to secure the cargo. Because cargo may shift during abrupt maneuvers, the loadmaster must determine the appropriate type(s), quantity and placement of cargo restraint.

Many loadmasters may also be required to be qualified for "aerial delivery" of paratroops or cargo by parachute. Compared to the relatively routine transportation of cargo, airdrops can be a highly technical and dangerous undertaking. Under some situations, the most effective way to resupply ground troops is by aerial delivery of equipment, ammunition, food, and medical supplies. Many military victories have been dependent in large part upon aerial delivery.

Cargo helicopter loadmasters provide aircraft clearance information and direct pilots to safe positions when landing and taking off.

== History ==
=== Development, early 1940s, and WWII ===
Although the aircraft loadmaster career field was not formally established by the US Air Force until 1953, duties eventually assumed by loadmasters began early in World War II when laundry personnel assigned to Air Corps quartermaster units began flying on troop carrier transports in the Australia and New Guinea, later in the China-Burma-India area of operations, to eject cargo bundles they have previously prepared for airdrop from the doors over drop zones. By 1944 the IX Troop Carrier Command in Europe included personnel designated as "dropmasters" in its troop carrier squadrons. Also in 1944 the Air Transport Command began assigning enlisted men, most of whom had been in training for aircrew duty in other fields, including pilots, navigators and bombardiers, as "flight clerks." The first flight clerks were assigned to special flights known as "Red Ball" which were set up to deliver crucial aircraft parts to ATC units in India assigned to the India-China Ferry. By the end of the war, flight clerks were flying on most four-engine transports to be responsible for cargo manifests and take care of passengers. Weight and balance computation does not appear to have initially been one of their duties, although it has been associated with the loadmaster career field since it was established. They were given the MOS 2967 - Flight Traffic Clerk. The new MOS was obviously an outgrowth of the 967 MOS, which had been given to men assigned to air cargo units as air traffic specialists.

During World War II, aircraft were initially loaded haphazardly, with ground personnel piling as much cargo into an airplane as possible, which often led to weight and balance problems. To alleviate the situation, air terminal squadrons were set up by the troop carrier wings overseas and, after the establishment of the Air Transport Command, at air terminals in the United States. Officers, pilots and navigators, were trained to perform weight and balance calculations and became responsible for load planning. Aerial engineers on bombers and four-engine transports were also trained in weight and balance calculations using special slide rules developed for each airplane and commonly known as "slipsticks".

=== Late 1940s, Korean War, and the 1950s ===
The term "loadmaster" is believed to have been created by the Douglas Aircraft Company, because the first known use of the term appears in the flight manuals for the C-124 Globemaster II aircraft in the late 1940s, the largest piston-engine transport aircraft in the US inventory at the time.

A fixed-wing aircraft is supported in flight only by its wing(s). For an aircraft to become and remain airborne, the wing must move through the air at a specified "angle of attack". To assure that the wing moves through the air at the proper angle of attack, the aircraft's center of gravity must fall within a range specified by the aircraft's designers. An aircraft that is too nose-heavy or too tail-heavy will not fly properly, because the angle of attack is affected adversely. This can destroy lift, and cause a stall in certain maneuvers.

The center of gravity of a transport aircraft is a function of a number of factors: the weight of the empty aircraft (the so-called "basic weight"), the weight of the fuel load (usually carried only in the wings), the weight of the cargo and passengers, and the weight of the crew, and the positions of each of these factors. The weight of each of these factors is known before a flight. What varies from flight to flight is not only the weight of any or all of these factors, but the position of such factors as fuel, passengers and cargo. The weight of each of these factors is converted into a moment by multiplying the weight of each item times its distance from a reference point which was established when the aircraft was designed. The sum of all moments is then divided by the sum of all weights and the result is the "center of gravity" for the aircraft with crew, fuel, cargo and passengers aboard. This center of gravity must be within a range specified by the designers. Furthermore, as fuel is burned off during flight the center of gravity changes continually, so that the aircraft becomes either more nose-heavy or more tail-heavy as the flight continues. This must be taken into account when the aircraft is loaded. An aircraft which was "within limits" on takeoff could, in the course of a flight, become "out of limits" because of fuel burnoff.

Throughout the 1950s, loadmasters in troop carrier units were assigned primarily to aerial port squadrons. In the Military Air Transport Service, they were assigned to air transport squadrons and flew on missions when cargo was carried. MATS loadmasters were considered cabin crewmembers rather than part of the flight crew and were not afforded crew rest as were members of the cockpit crew.

=== 1960s, the Vietnam War, and 1970s ===
In the early 1960s with the advent of the Lockheed C-130 Hercules and the increasing role of troop carrier transports in Southeast Asia, loadmasters were reassigned from aerial port units to troop carrier squadrons where they assumed duties previously assigned to scanners and became part of the flight crew. Loadmasters became extremely important in the harsh conditions of Southeast Asia, where troop carrier aircraft operated into forward airfields that were often under fire, especially after the Tet Offensive of 1968 when soldiers and Marines began calling C-123s and C-130s "mortar magnets." The loadmaster's task was to discharge the load as quickly as possible so the airplane could get off the ground to avoid incoming rocket and mortar fire. Loadmasters were also trained to drop flares and leaflets, and to operate retrieval equipment used in special operations aircraft.

In 1964, MATS became the Military Airlift Command (MAC) and assumed more of an operational role. Loadmasters, often first-term airmen, continued the previous role, but were also trained for tactical operations, particularly aerial delivery of troops and cargo from C-141s. When the gigantic C-5A entered service, the loadmaster field became more technical as loadmasters became responsible for operating complex systems to operate the hydraulic systems that operated the forward and aft cargo doors and to kneel the airplane for loading and unloading.

The Vietnam War also led to the assignment of loadmasters to Airlift Control Elements, commonly known as ALCE (aka TALCE when deployed), where they were responsible for planning loads at forward locations with Army and Marine Corps units.

=== 1980s and after ===
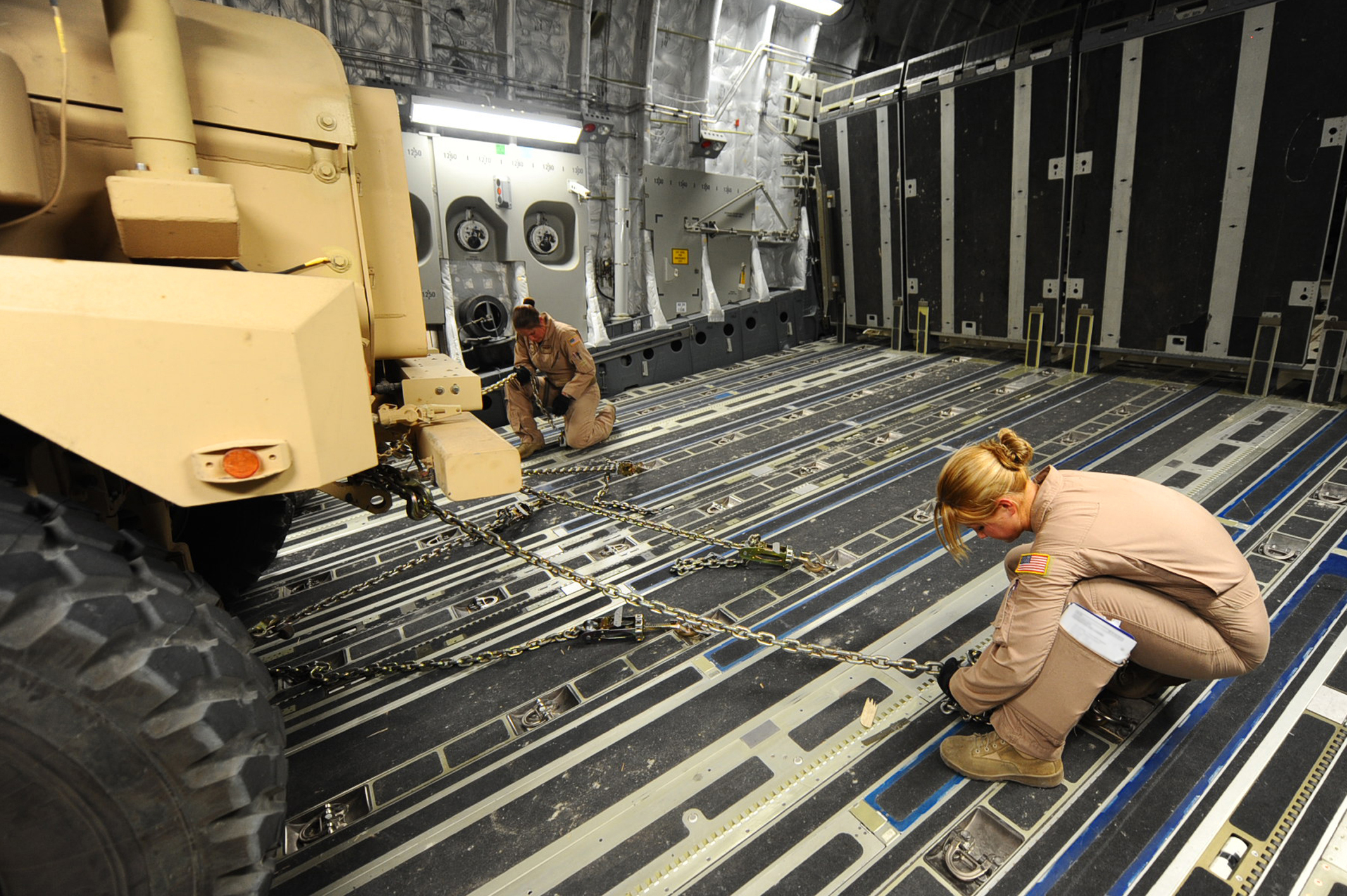
Two USAF loadmasters securing a vehicle inside of an aircraft in 2010

Until the 1980s, loadmasters were found primarily within the military, but as civilian airlines became more involved in air freight operations with large airplanes, particularly, the Boeing 747, many companies began using loadmasters on flights where complex cargo loads were carried.

== Loadmasters decorated for valor ==
Airman First Class John Levitow became the only loadmaster to be decorated with the Medal of Honor after his AC-47 gunship was struck by a Viet Cong mortar near Bien Hoa in 1968. Badly wounded, Levitow managed to throw an armed flare out of the airplane before it ignited the airplane's ammunition stores.

Staff Sergeant Charles Schaub was awarded the Air Force Cross for his actions when his C-130 was struck by ground fire during an airdrop mission over An Loc in 1972.

Staff Sergeant Maynard Grubbs was awarded the Silver Star for his role as the loadmaster on the C-123 crew commanded by Lt. Col. Joe M. Jackson, who landed his C-123 at Khe Sanh to pick up members of an Air Force airlift control team that had been stranded at the besieged camp at Kham Duc. (Lt. Col. Jackson was awarded the Medal of Honor for the action.)

Several other loadmasters received Silver Stars for actions in Blind Bat C-130 flareships and Staff Sergeant Ralph Bemis received the medal after the C-130 he was on was shot down over An Loc.

Sergeant Daniel Baxter (RAF) was a Chinook loadmaster and a crew member of the standby Chinook at Camp Bastion, Afghanistan. He was mentioned in dispatches for actions on 6 September 2006 that he acted with exceptional professionalism and bravery under enemy fire three times.

Sergeant Graham Jones, 32, a Chinook crewman, has been honoured for going beyond his duties by leaving the aircraft in order to fire at the enemy in the heartland of the Taliban so that a quadbike rider could make his getaway on the ground.

== See also ==
- Loading master, a similar role at sea ports
