= Marine loading arm =

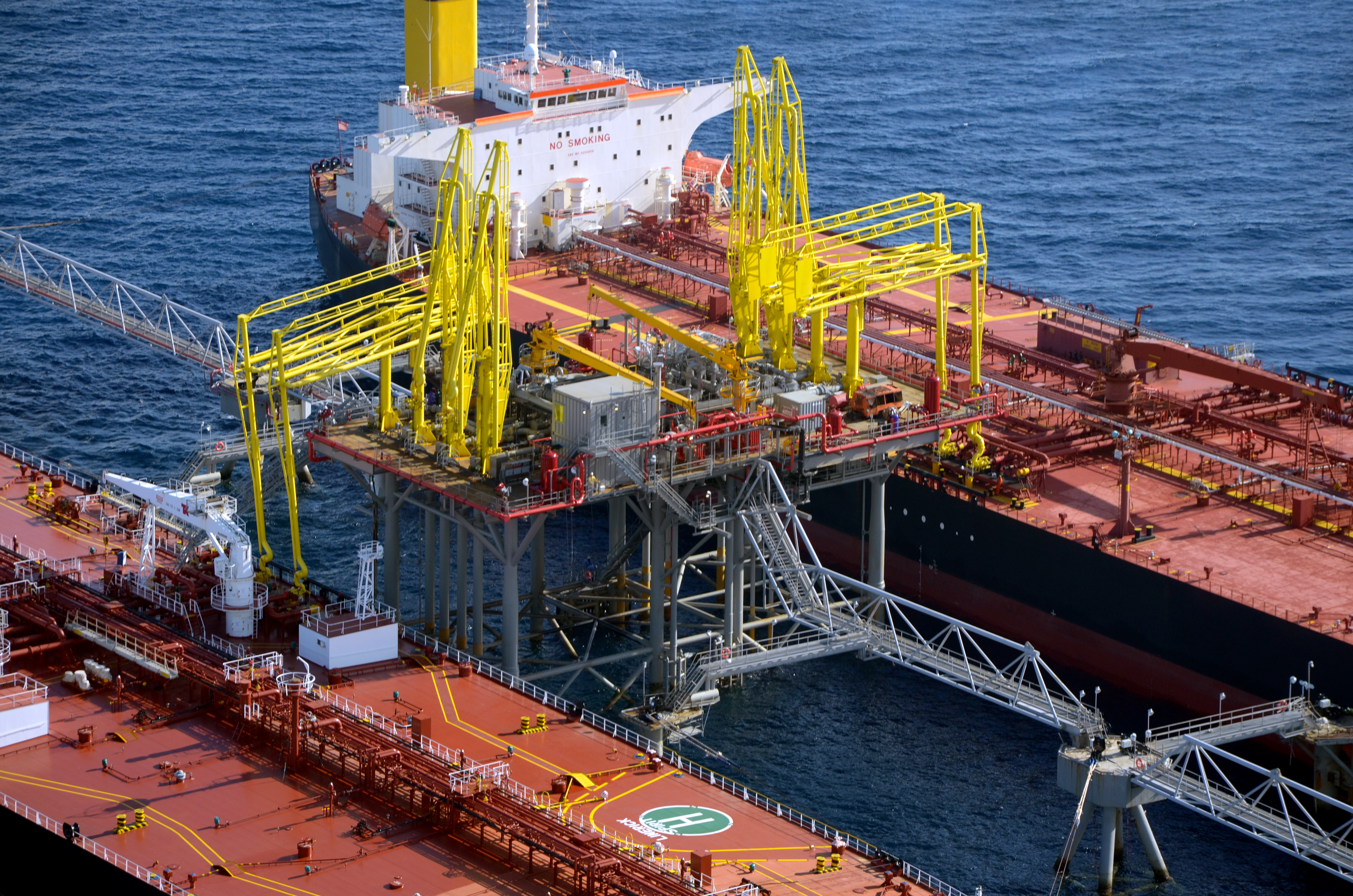
Four of eight marine loading arms connected to two oil tankers

A marine loading arm, also known as a mechanical loading arm, loading arm, or MLA is a mechanical arm consisting of articulated steel pipes that connect a tankship such as an oil tanker or chemical tanker to a cargo terminal. Genericized trademarks such as Chiksan (often misspelled Chicksan) are often used to refer to marine loading arms.

== Operation and design ==
A marine loading arm is an alternative to direct hose hookups that is particularly useful for larger vessels and transfers at higher loading rates and pressures. Controlled manually or hydraulically, a loading arm employs swivel joints and can, to some extent, follow the movement of a moored vessel. Many loading arm systems feature quick-connect fittings. Gasket or o-ring arrangements are required to make a secure seal to the ship's manifold flange. A loading arm must be drained or closed off before the connection is broken off. This is usually done in two ways. For fuels such as gas oil and diesel, the lines can be blown out with high pressure air. In the case of fuels such as kerosene or petrol, the lines can be stripped with pumps.

Loading arms can handle both liquids and gases, in a wide range of viscosities and temperatures. Cargoes from liquid sulphur to liquefied natural gas are moved through marine loading arms. Loading arms service vessels in a wide range of sizes, from small river barges to the largest supertankers.

Various designs exist, and specific installations can be tailored for a given port based on considerations such as vessel size, cargo flow rate and cargo temperature. Environmental constraints, such as the range of tide, wind conditions, and earthquake tolerance, can also affect choice of loading arm. A loading arm installation may include add-ons such as hydraulic or manual quick connect couplers, position monitoring systems, emergency release systems, and piggyback vapor return lines.

Compared to cargo hoses, the loading arm's main drawback is its comparative lack of flexibility.

== History ==
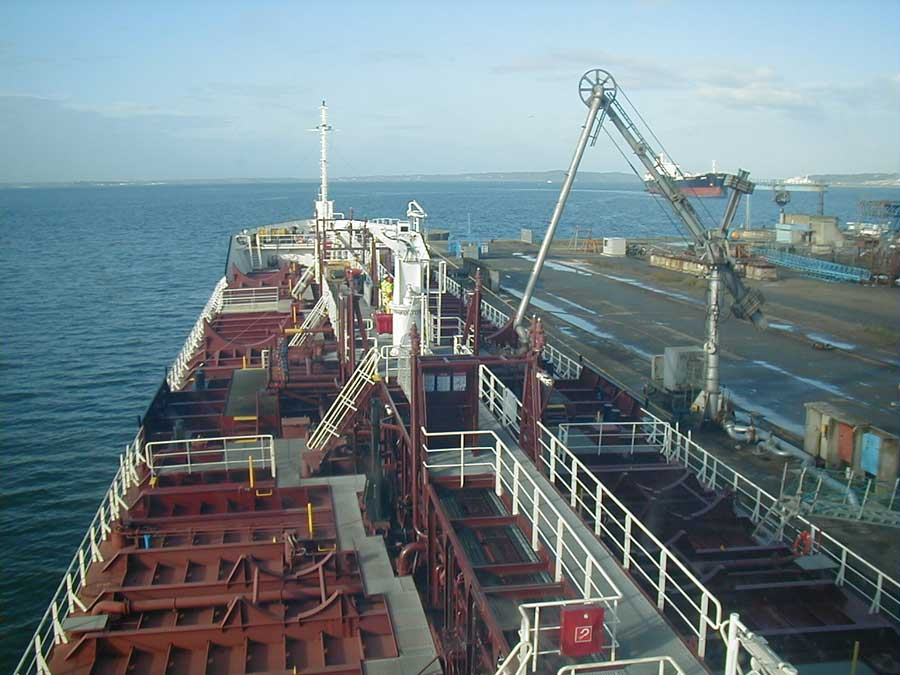
A chemical or oil tanker connected to the pier with a marine loading arm.

Since the earliest days of tankships, the need to safely and efficiently transfer bulk liquid to a moored ship has been fundamental. An insufficient solution to this problem led to one of the world's first oil tanker disasters. In 1881, the Branobel tanker Nordenskjöld was taking on kerosene in Baku. The ship was connected to the pier with a simple piece of pipe. While loading, the ship was hit by a gust of wind and the cargo pipe carrying was jerked away from the hold. Kerosene then spilled onto the deck and down into the engine room, where mechanics were working in the light of kerosene lanterns. The ship then exploded, killing half the crew. Ludvig Nobel responded to the disaster by creating a flexible, leakproof loading pipe which was much more resistant to spills.

Chiksan brand marine loading arm manufacturer FMC Technologies claims to have built the world's first all-steel marine loading arm in 1956 and to have over 8,000 units installed worldwide.

== See also ==
- Oil tanker
- Chemical tanker
