= USS Saratoga (CV-3) =

Lexington-class aircraft carrier

Coordinates: 11°34′53″N 165°29′55″E

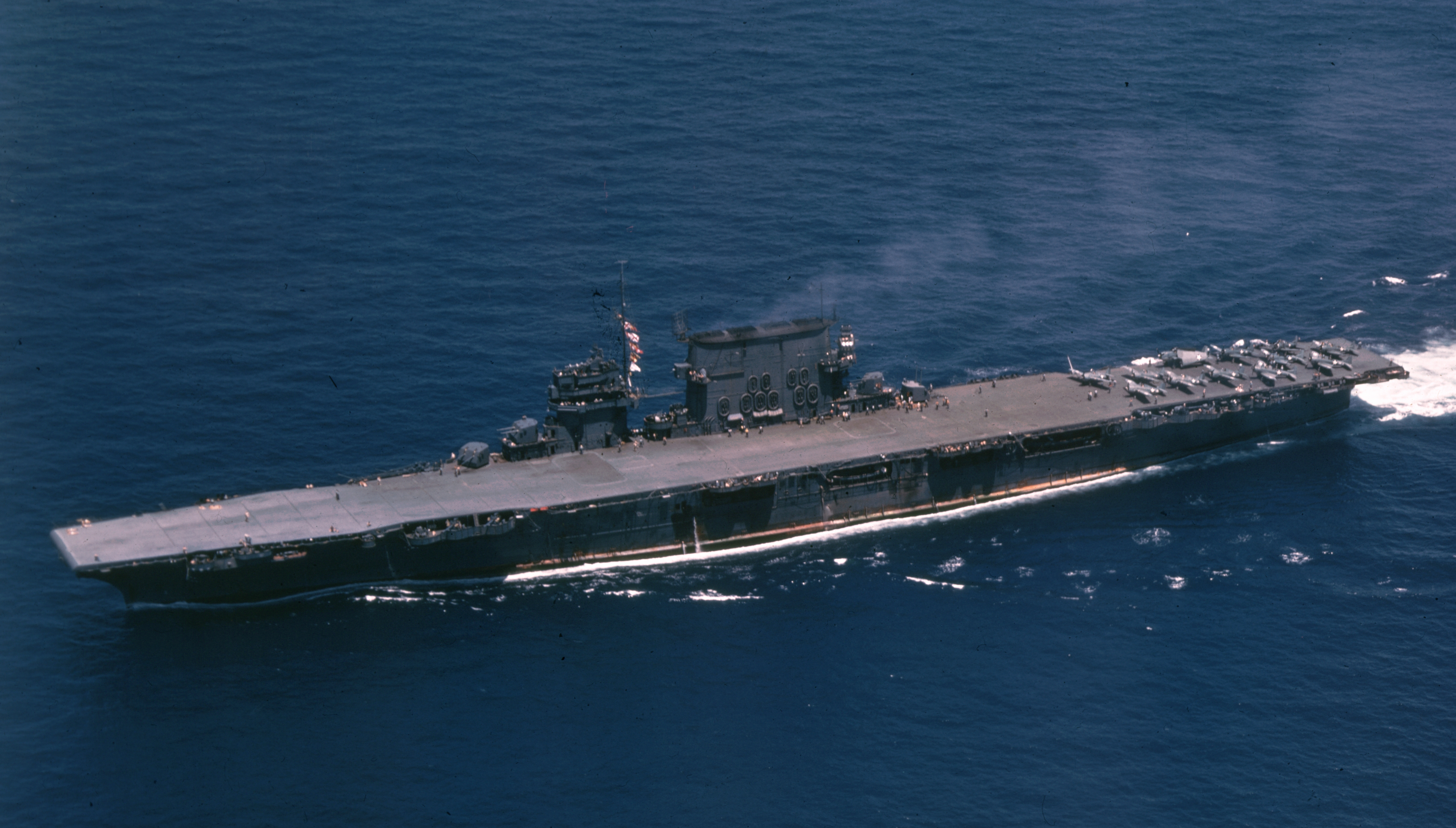
- Saratoga underway in 1942, after her lengthy refit

History

United States
- Name: Saratoga
- Namesake: Battles of Saratoga
- Ordered: 1917 (as a battlecruiser); 1922 (as an aircraft carrier)
- Builder: New York Shipbuilding Corporation
- Laid down: 25 September 1920
- Launched: 7 April 1925
- Commissioned: 16 November 1927
- Reclassified: 1 July 1922 to aircraft carrier
- Stricken: 15 August 1946
- Identification: Hull number: CC-3, then CV-3
- Nickname(s): Sara Maru; Sister Sara
- Honors and awards: 8 battle stars
- Fate: Sunk during Operation Crossroads atomic bomb testing, 25 July 1946

General characteristics (as built)
- Class & type: Lexington-class aircraft carrier
- Displacement: 36,000 long tons (37,000 t) (standard)
- Length: 888 ft (270.7 m)
- Beam: 106 ft (32.3 m)
- Draft: 30 ft 5 in (9.3 m) (deep load)
- Installed power: 16 water-tube boilers; 180,000 shp (130,000 kW)
- Propulsion: 4 shafts; 4 sets turbo-electric drive
- Speed: 33.25 knots (61.58 km/h; 38.26 mph)
- Range: 10,000 nmi (19,000 km; 12,000 mi) at 10 knots (19 km/h; 12 mph)
- Complement: 2,791 (including aviation personnel) in 1942
- Armament: 4 × twin 8 in (203 mm) guns; 12 × single 5 in (127 mm) AA guns
- Armor: Belt: 5–7 in (127–178 mm); Deck: 0.75–2 in (19–51 mm); Gun turrets: 0.75 in (19 mm); Bulkheads: 5–7 in (127–178 mm)
- Aircraft carried: 78
- Aviation facilities: 1 Aircraft catapult

USS Saratoga (CV-3) was a Lexington-class aircraft carrier built for the United States Navy during the 1920s. Originally designed as a battlecruiser, she was converted into one of the Navy's first aircraft carriers during construction to comply with the Washington Naval Treaty of 1922. The ship entered service in 1928 and was assigned to the Pacific Fleet for her entire career. Saratoga and her sister ship, Lexington, were used to develop and refine carrier tactics in a series of annual exercises before World War II. On more than one occasion these exercises included successful surprise attacks on Pearl Harbor, Hawaii. She was one of three prewar US fleet aircraft carriers, along with Enterprise and Ranger, to serve throughout World War II.

Shortly after the Japanese attack on Pearl Harbor, Saratoga was the centerpiece of the unsuccessful American effort to relieve Wake Island and was torpedoed by a Japanese submarine a few weeks later. After lengthy repairs, the ship supported forces participating in the Guadalcanal campaign and her aircraft sank the light carrier Ryūjō during the Battle of the Eastern Solomons in August 1942. She was again torpedoed the following month and returned to the Solomon Islands area after repairs were completed.

In 1943, Saratoga supported Allied forces involved in the New Georgia Campaign and invasion of Bougainville in the northern Solomon Islands and her aircraft twice attacked the Japanese base at Rabaul in November. Early in 1944, her aircraft provided air support during the Gilbert and Marshall Islands Campaign before she was transferred to the Indian Ocean for several months to support the British Eastern Fleet as it attacked targets in Java and Sumatra. After a brief refit in mid-1944, the ship became a training ship for the rest of the year.

In early 1945, Saratoga participated in the Battle of Iwo Jima as a dedicated night fighter carrier. Several days into the battle, she was badly damaged by kamikaze hits and was forced to return to the United States for repairs. While under repair, the ship, now increasingly obsolete, was permanently modified as a training carrier with some of her hangar deck converted into classrooms. Saratoga remained in this role for the rest of the war and was then used to ferry troops back to the United States after the Japanese surrender in August, as a part of Operation Magic Carpet. In mid-1946, the ship was a target for nuclear weapon tests during Operation Crossroads. She survived the first test with little damage, but was sunk by a second test.

== Design and construction ==
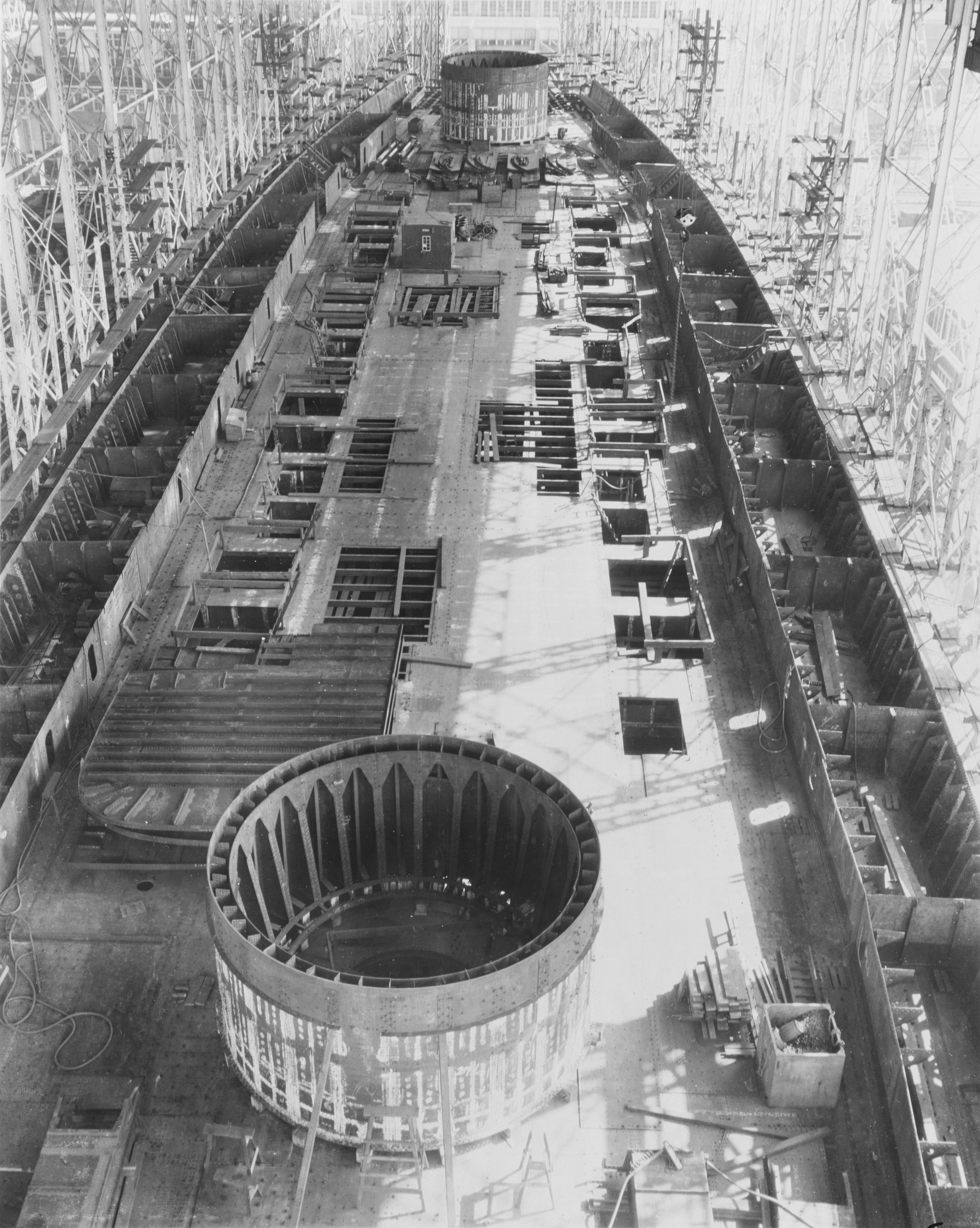
Saratoga on 8 March 1922, after her construction had been suspended. There are circular barbettes on blocks on her deck, which would have been used for the battlecruiser's main battery

Saratoga was the fifth US Navy ship so named after the 1777 Battle of Saratoga, an important victory during the Revolutionary War. She was originally authorized in 1916 as a Lexington-class battlecruiser, but before she was laid down construction was placed on hold so that higher-priority anti-submarine vessels and merchant ships, needed to ensure the safe passage of men and materiel to Europe during Germany's U-boat campaign, could be built. After the war the design was extensively altered to incorporate improved boiler technology, anti-torpedo bulges, and a general increase in armor protection based on British wartime experiences. Given the hull number of CC-3, Saratoga was laid down on 25 September 1920 by New York Shipbuilding Corporation of Camden, New Jersey.

In February 1922, before the Washington Naval Conference concluded, the ship's construction was suspended when she was 28 percent complete. She was ordered to be converted to an aircraft carrier with the hull number CV-3 on 1 July 1922. Her displacement was reduced by a total of 4,000 long tons (4,100 t), achieved mainly by the elimination of her main armament of eight 16-inch (406 mm) guns in four twin gun turrets (including their heavy barbettes, armor, and other equipment). The main armor belt was retained, although it was reduced in height to save weight. The hull generally remained unaltered, as did the torpedo protection system, because they had already been built and it would have been too expensive to alter them.

The ship had an overall length of 888 feet (270.7 m), a beam of 106 feet (32.3 m), and a draft of 30 feet 5 inches (9.3 m) at deep load. Saratoga had a standard displacement of 36,000 long tons (36,578 t), and 43,055 long tons (43,746 t) at deep load. At that displacement, she had a metacentric height of 7.31 feet (2.2 m).

Christened by Olive Doolittle, wife of Curtis D. Wilbur, Secretary of the Navy, Saratoga was launched on 7 April 1925 and commissioned on 16 November 1927, under the command of Captain Harry E. Yarnell. She was nicknamed by her crew Sister Sara and, later, Sara Maru. In 1942, the ship had a crew of 100 officers and 1,840 enlisted men, and an aviation group totaling 141 officers and 710 enlisted men. By 1945, her crew totaled 3,373, including her aviation group.

=== Flight deck arrangements ===
The ship's flight deck was 866 feet 2 inches (264.01 m) long and had a maximum width of 105 feet 11 inches (32.28 m). Her flight deck was widened forward and extended 16 feet (4.9 m) aft during her refit in mid-1941. When built, her hangar "was the largest single enclosed space afloat on any ship" and had an area of 33,528 square feet (3,114.9 m^{2}). It was 424 feet (129.2 m) long and no less than 68 feet (20.7 m) wide. Its minimum height was 21 feet (6.4 m), and it was divided by a single fire curtain just forward of the aft aircraft elevator. Aircraft repair shops, 108 feet (32.9 m) long, were aft of the hangar, and below them was a storage space for disassembled aircraft, 128 feet (39.0 m) long. Saratoga was fitted with two hydraulically powered elevators on her centerline. The forward elevator's dimensions were 30 by 60 feet (9.1 m × 18.3 m) and it had a capacity of 16,000 pounds (7,300 kg). The aft elevator had a capacity of only 6,000 pounds (2,700 kg) and measured 30 by 36 feet (9.1 m × 11.0 m). Avgas was stored in eight compartments of the torpedo protection system, and their capacity has been quoted as either 132,264 US gallons (500,670 L; 110,133 imp gal) or 163,000 US gallons (620,000 L; 136,000 imp gal).

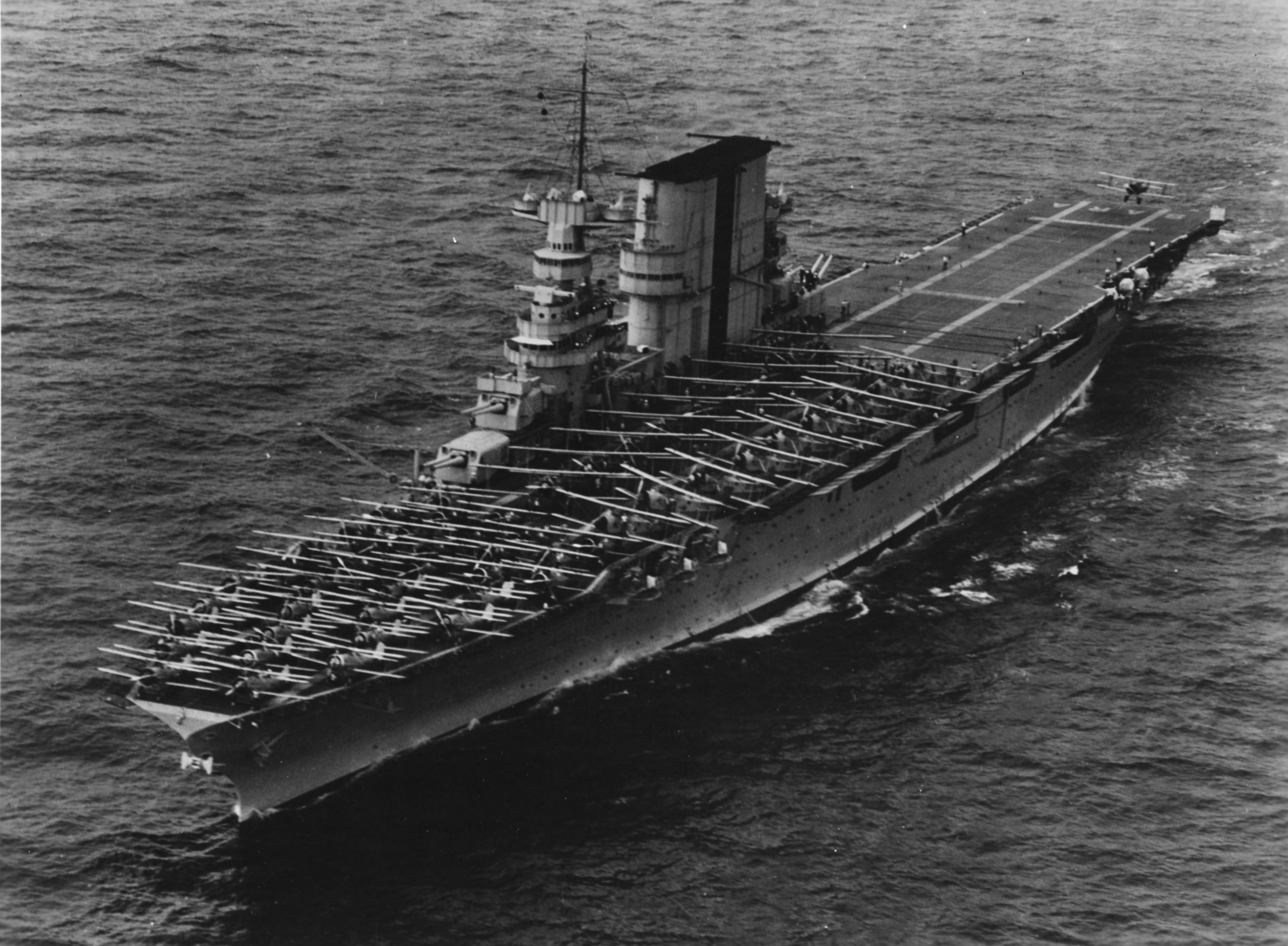
Saratoga landing aircraft, 6 June 1935

Saratoga was initially fitted with electrically operated arresting gear designed by Carl Norden that used longitudinal wires intended to prevent the aircraft from being blown over the side of the ship, and transverse wires to slow the aircraft to a stop. This system was authorized to be replaced by the hydraulically operated Mk 2 system, without longitudinal wires, on 11 August 1931. Four improved Mk 3 units were added in 1934, giving the ship a total of eight arresting wires and four barriers intended to prevent aircraft from crashing into parked aircraft on the ship's bow. When the forward flight deck was widened, an additional eight wires were added there to allow aircraft to land over the bow if the landing area at the stern was damaged. The ship was built with a 155-foot (47.2 m), flywheel-powered, F Mk II aircraft catapult, also designed by Norden, on the starboard side of the bow. This catapult was strong enough to launch a 10,000-pound (4,500 kg) aircraft at a speed of 48 knots (89 km/h; 55 mph). It was intended to launch seaplanes, but was rarely used; a 1931 report counted only five launches of practice loads since the ship had been commissioned. It was removed some time after 1936.

Relatively few changes were made during the war to Saratoga's aircraft-handling equipment. Her crew removed her forward arresting wires in late 1943, although their hydraulic systems were not removed until her refit in mid-1944. At that time she received two Type H hydraulic catapults mounted in her forward flight deck to handle the heavier aircraft entering service. Before the war, plans were made to replace the aft elevator with a 44-by-48-foot (13.4 m × 14.6 m) model, but manufacturing delays and operational demands prevented this from ever happening. By mid-1942, the increasing size and weight of naval aircraft exceeded the capacity of the aft elevator and it was locked in place. It was removed in March 1945 to save weight and the opening in the flight deck was plated over. The machinery for the forward elevator was scheduled to be upgraded before the war, but this was not done until mid-1944. A new, 44-by-48-foot lightweight forward elevator as used in the Essex-class carriers was installed in March 1945.

Saratoga was not designed to carry any specific number of aircraft, but in April 1923 a carrier air group of 36 fighters, 32 bombers or torpedo bombers, and 18 observation planes, plus 3 utility planes, was outlined for it. This was still several years before the ship was commissioned, and plans changed over that time: by mid-1928 the number of bomber/torpedo bombers had been reduced to 18, the observation planes were dispensed with, and a 12-plane scouting squadron was added. By the spring of 1936, her air group included a fighter squadron, with 18 Grumman F3F fighters and 1 Vought SBU scout-bomber (the latter serving as a liaison plane, per the Navy's then-current aerial defense doctrine); a fighter-bomber squadron, with 18 Curtiss BFC fighter-bombers, and an SBU; a scout bomber squadron, with 18 Vought SBU dive bombers; and a torpedo bomber squadron, with 18 Great Lakes TG-2 torpedo bombers. This TG squadron was, at this time, the only carrier squadron in the Navy that could carry torpedoes. Miscellaneous aircraft included two Grumman JF Duck amphibians and three Vought O2U Corsair observation aircraft. This amounted to 79 aircraft, and this remained the approximate authorized strength into the war years. Spare planes of all types were kept in pools at shore bases, to be rotated in when an active plane was lost, or required major repair or overhaul, or when a ship was to be deployed away from a major base for a substantial period of time; in the latter case the ship was allowed to keep 3 spare aircraft aboard for each of its squadrons. Otherwise carriage of planes in excess of Authorized Operating Strengths (the numbers given above) was prohibited, without special authorization from the Chief of Naval Operations, prior to fiscal year1942.

In early 1945, the ship carried 53 Grumman F6F Hellcat fighters and 17 Grumman TBF Avenger torpedo bombers.

=== Propulsion ===
The Lexington-class carriers used turbo-electric propulsion; each of the four propeller shafts was driven by two 22,500-shaft-horsepower (16,800 kW) electric motors. They were powered by four turbo generators from General Electric rated at 35,200 kilowatts (47,200 hp). Steam for the generators was provided by sixteen Yarrow boilers, each in its own individual compartment. Six 750-kilowatt (1,010 hp) electric generators were installed in the upper levels of the two main turbine compartments to provide power to meet the ship's hotel load (minimum electrical) requirements.

The ship was designed to reach 33.25 knots (61.58 km/h; 38.26 mph). She carried a maximum of 6,688 long tons (6,795 t) of fuel oil, but only 5,400 long tons (5,500 t) of that was usable, as the rest had to be retained as ballast in the port fuel tanks to offset the weight of the island and main guns. Designed for a range of 10,000 nautical miles (19,000 km; 12,000 mi) at a speed of 10 knots (19 km/h; 12 mph), the ship demonstrated a range of 9,910 nmi (18,350 km; 11,400 mi) at a speed of 10.7 knots (19.8 km/h; 12.3 mph) with 4,540 long tons (4,610 t) of oil.

=== Armament ===
The Navy's Bureau of Construction and Repair was not convinced when the class was being designed that aircraft could effectively substitute as armament for a warship, especially at night or in bad weather that would prevent air operations. Thus the carriers' design included a substantial gun battery of eight 55-caliber Mk 9 eight-inch guns in four twin gun turrets. These turrets were mounted above the flight deck on the starboard side, two before the superstructure, and two behind the funnel, numbered I to IV from bow to stern. In theory the guns could fire to both sides, but it is probable that firing them to port would have damaged the flight deck. They could be depressed to −5° and elevated to +41°.

The ship's heavy anti-aircraft (AA) armament consisted of twelve 25-caliber Mk 10 five-inch guns which were mounted on single mounts, three each fitted on sponsons on each side of the bow and stern. No light AA guns were initially mounted on Saratoga, but two twin .50-caliber (12.7 mm) machine gun mounts were installed in 1929. They were unsuccessful, but only the mount on the roof of Turret II was replaced by two .50-caliber (12.7 mm) machine guns by 1934. During the ship's August 1941 overhaul, four 3-inch/50-caliber Mk 10 AA guns were installed in the corner platforms. Another three-inch gun was added on the roof of the deckhouse between the funnel and the island. In addition, a number of .50-caliber machine guns were added on platforms mounted on her superstructure. The three-inch guns were just interim weapons until the quadruple 1.1-inch/75-caliber gun mount could be fielded, which occurred during a brief refit at the Bremerton Navy Yard in late November 1941.

While receiving temporary repairs at Pearl Harbor in January 1942 (after being torpedoed on 11 January 1942), Saratoga's eight-inch turrets, barbettes and ammunition hoists were removed; they were replaced by four twin 5-inch/38-caliber dual-purpose gun mounts in February at Bremerton. New barbettes were built and the ammunition hoists had to be returned from Pearl Harbor. The eight-inch guns and turrets were reused as coast defense weapons on Oahu. The older 5-inch/25-caliber guns were replaced at the same time by eight more 5-inch/38-caliber dual-purpose guns in single mounts. As the new guns were heavier than the older ones, only two could be added to the corner gun platforms; the space formerly used by the third gun on each platform was used by an additional quadruple 1.1-inch mount. In addition 32 Oerlikon 20 mm cannon were installed, six at the base of the funnel and the others distributed along the sides and rear of the flight deck. When the ship's repairs were completed in late May, her armament consisted of 16 five-inch guns, nine quadruple 1.1-inch gun mounts and 32 Oerlikon 20-millimeter (0.79 in) guns.

After the ship was again torpedoed on 31 August 1942, her 1.1-inch gun mounts were replaced by an equal number of quadruple Bofors 40 mm mounts while she was under repair at Pearl Harbor. Her light anti-aircraft armament was also increased to 52 Oerlikon guns at the same time. In January 1944 a number of her 20 mm guns were replaced by more Bofors guns, many of which were in the positions formerly occupied by the ship's boats in the sides of the hull. Saratoga mounted 23 quadruple and two twin 40 mm mountings as well as 16 Oerlikon guns when she completed her refit.

=== Fire control and electronics ===
The two superfiring eight-inch turrets had a Mk 30 rangefinder at the rear of the turret for local control, but the guns were normally controlled by two Mk 18 fire-control directors, one each on the fore and aft spotting tops. A 20-foot (6.1 m) rangefinder was fitted on top of the pilothouse to provide range information for the directors. Each group of three 5-inch guns was controlled by a Mk 19 director, two of which were mounted on each side of the spotting tops. Plans were made before the war to replace the obsolete Mk 19 directors with two heavier Mk 33 directors, one each on the fore and aft five-inch spotting tops, but these plans were cancelled when the dual-purpose guns replaced the main armament in early 1942.

Saratoga received a CXAM-1 early warning radar from RCA in February 1941 during a refit in Bremerton. The antenna was mounted on the forward lip of the funnel with its control room directly below the aerial, replacing the secondary conning station formerly mounted there. She also received two FC (Mk 3) surface fire-control radars in late 1941, although these were both removed along with her main armament in January 1942. The new dual-purpose guns were controlled by two Mk 37 directors, each mounting an FD (Mk 4) anti-aircraft gunnery radar. When the 1.1-inch guns were replaced by 40 mm guns in 1942, the directors for the smaller guns were replaced by five Mk 51 directors. A small SC-1 early warning radar was mounted on the rear lip of the funnel during 1942. A SG surface-search radar was mounted on the foremast at the same time.

During the ship's refit in January 1944, her electronics were modernized. The CXAM was replaced by an SK model and the SC-1 was replaced by an SC-3. The forward SG was supplemented by an additional SG-1 mounted on a short mast at the aft end of the funnel. A lengthier overhaul in mid-1944 provided the opportunity to revise the radar arrangements. The SK radar was moved to the rebuilt foremast and the forward SG radar was replaced by an SG-1 mounted at the top of the foremast. An SM-1 fighter-control radar was mounted in the SK's former position and new antennas were added to the FD radars to allow them to determine target height. The SC-3 was replaced by an SC-4 in early 1945.

=== Armor ===
The waterline belt of the Lexington-class ships tapered 7–5 inches (178–127 mm) in thickness from top to bottom and angled 11° outwards at the top. It covered the middle 530 feet (161.5 m) of the ships. Forward, the belt ended in a bulkhead that also tapered from seven to five inches in thickness. Aft, it terminated at a seven-inch bulkhead. This belt had a height of 9 feet 4 inches (2.8 m). The third deck over the ships' machinery and magazine was armored with two layers of special treatment steel (STS) totaling 2 inches (51 mm) in thickness; the steering gear was protected by two layers of STS that totaled 3 inches (76 mm) on the flat and 4.5 inches (114 mm) on the slope.

The gun turrets were protected only against splinters with .75 inches (19 mm) of armor. The conning tower was armored with 2–2.25 inches (51–57 mm) of STS, and it had a communications tube with two-inch sides running from the conning tower down to the lower conning position on the third deck. The torpedo defense system of the Lexington-class ships consisted of three to six medium steel protective bulkheads that ranged from .375 to .75 inches (10 to 19 mm) in thickness. The spaces between them could be used as fuel tanks or left empty to absorb the detonation of a torpedo's warhead.

=== Structural changes ===
While under repair after being torpedoed on 11 January 1942, Saratoga received a 7-foot-2-inch (2.2 m) bulge on the starboard side of her hull. This was primarily intended to increase the ship's buoyancy, improve stability and allow her full fuel capacity to be utilized. The bulge was estimated to increase her metacentric height by 3 feet (0.9 m) and decrease her speed by one-quarter of a knot. It was also used to store additional fuel oil and increased her capacity to a total of 9,748 long tons (9,904 t). At the same time, her funnel was shortened by 20 feet (6.1 m) and her tripod foremast was replaced by a light pole mast to reduce her topweight.

All of these changes, including the lengthening of the flight deck, increased Saratoga's full-load displacement in 1945 to 49,552 long tons (50,347 t). Her overall length increased to 909.45 feet (277.2 m) and her beam, at the waterline, to 111 feet 9 inches (34.1 m), too wide to use the Panama Canal.

== Service history ==
=== Inter-war period ===
Saratoga was commissioned one month earlier than her sister ship, Lexington. As the ship was visually identical to Lexington, her funnel was painted with a large black vertical stripe to help pilots recognize her. She began her shakedown cruise on 6 January 1928 and five days later Marc A. Mitscher landed the first aircraft on board. Later that month, the rigid airship Los Angeles was refueled and resupplied when she moored to Saratoga's stern on 27 January. That same day, the ship sailed for the Pacific via the Panama Canal, although she was diverted briefly en route to carry Marines to Corinto, Nicaragua, before joining the Battle Fleet at San Pedro, California, on 21 February. On 15 September, Captain John Halligan, Jr. relieved the newly promoted Rear Admiral Yarnell. Panama Canal pilots had never before handled a ship with such a significant flight deck overhang. Saratoga knocked over all the adjacent concrete lamp posts while passing through the Gatun locks.

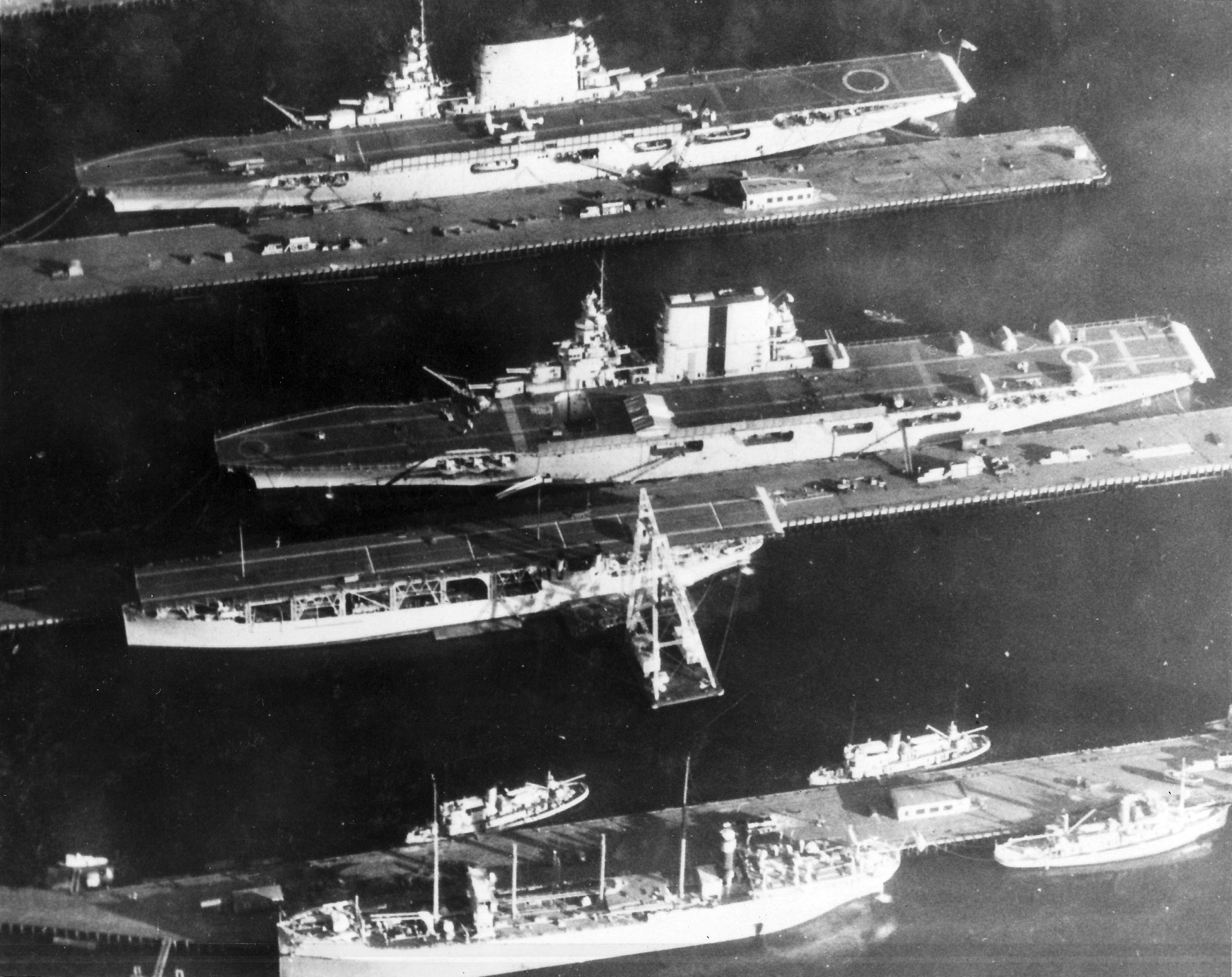
Carriers Saratoga (center), Lexington (top), and Langley (below) at Puget Sound Navy Yard in 1929. As Saratoga and Lexington were visually identical, Saratoga had a black stripe painted on her funnel for identification purposes.

In January 1929, Saratoga participated in her first fleet exercise, Fleet Problem IX, a simulated attack on the Panama Canal. These exercises tested the Navy's evolving doctrine and tactics for the use of carriers. The ship was detached from the fleet with only the light cruiser Omaha as escort and made a wide sweep to the south to attack the canal, which was defended by the Scouting Fleet and Lexington, from an unexpected direction. Although the carrier was spotted by two defending ships before she launched her air strike, her aircraft were deemed to have destroyed the canal locks. Saratoga was "sunk" later the same day by an airstrike from Lexington. Captain Frederick J. Horne assumed command on 20 April. The following year, Saratoga and Langley were "disabled" by a surprise attack from Lexington in Fleet Problem X in the Caribbean. Saratoga returned the favor shortly afterward in Fleet Problem XI, further demonstrating the vulnerability of carriers to aerial attack. Following the exercises, Saratoga participated in the Presidential Review at Norfolk, Virginia, in May and then returned to San Pedro. Captain Frank McCrary relieved Horne on 5 September 1930.

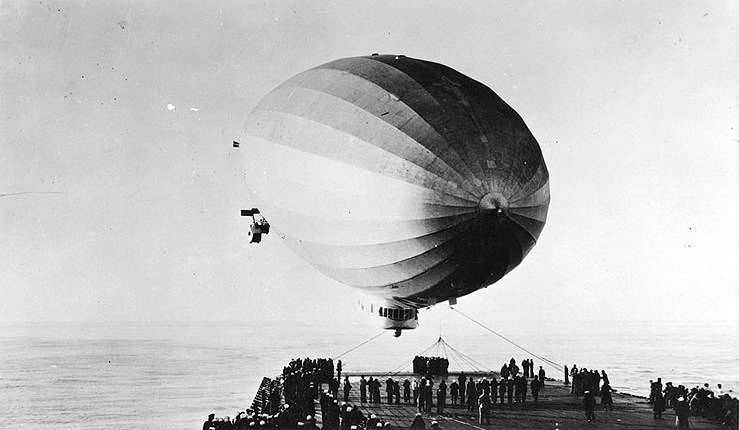
USS Los Angeles ties up aboard Saratoga in January 1928, the first time a rigid airship had been moored to an aircraft carrier

Saratoga was assigned, together with Lexington, to defend the west coast of Panama against a hypothetical invader during Fleet Problem XII in February 1931. While each carrier was able to inflict some damage on the invasion convoys, the enemy forces succeeded in making a landing. All three carriers then transferred to the Caribbean to conduct further maneuvers, including one in which Saratoga successfully defended the Caribbean side of the Panama Canal from a staged attack by Lexington. Rear Admiral Joseph M. Reeves baited a trap for Lexington's captain, Ernest J. King, with a destroyer and scored a kill on Lexington on 22 March while the latter's aircraft were still searching for Saratoga. The 1932 movie Hell Divers was filmed aboard the ship and starred Wallace Beery and a young Clark Gable as a pair of competing aircraft gunners assigned to VF-1B.

During Grand Joint Exercise No. 4, Saratoga and Lexington were able to launch an airstrike against Pearl Harbor on Sunday, 7 February 1932, without being detected. The two carriers were separated for Fleet Problem XIII which followed shortly afterward. Blue Fleet and Saratoga were tasked to attack Hawaii and the West Coast defended by Lexington and the Black Fleet. On 15 March, Lexington caught Saratoga with all of her planes still on deck and was ruled to have knocked out her flight deck and have badly damaged the carrier, which was subsequently judged sunk during a night attack by Black Fleet destroyers. Captain George W. Steele assumed command on 11 July 1932. While en route from San Diego to San Pedro, the ship briefly ran aground off Sunset Beach, California, on 17 August. Captain Rufus F. Zogbaum, Jr. (son of the famous illustrator) relieved Steele, who was ordered to immediately retire, on 1 January 1933.

Before Fleet Problem XIV began the following month, the Army and the Navy conducted a joint exercise simulating a carrier attack on Hawaii. Lexington and Saratoga successfully attacked Pearl Harbor at dawn on 31 January without being detected. During the actual fleet problem, the ship successfully attacked targets in and around Los Angeles and San Francisco although she was damaged by opposing ships during the latter attack. Scenes from the 1933 Joe E. Brown film comedy, Son of a Sailor, were filmed aboard Saratoga and featured flight deck musters of the ships' company. Fleet Problem XV returned to the Gulf of Panama and the Caribbean in April–May 1934; the participating ships of the Pacific Fleet remained in the Caribbean and off the East Coast for more training and maneuvers until they returned to their home bases in November. Captain Kenneth Whiting relieved Zogbaum on 12 June, after the conclusion of the fleet problem.

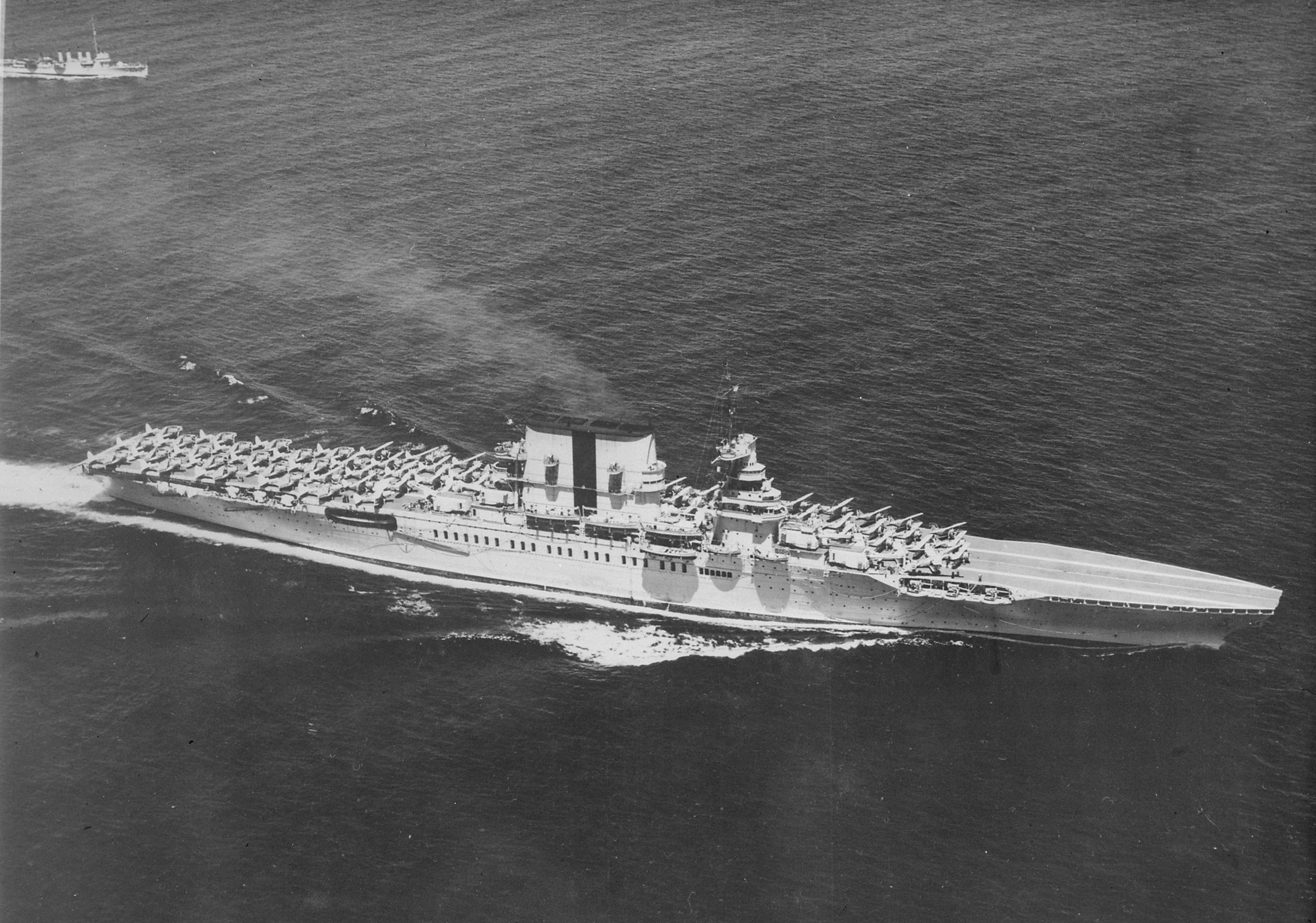
Saratoga launching aircraft on 31 May 1934 during her Atlantic deployment

Captain William F. Halsey assumed command on 6 July 1935 after the conclusion of Fleet Problem XVI. From 27 April to 6 June 1936, she participated in a Fleet Problem in the Panama Canal Zone where she was "sunk" by opposing battlecruisers and later ruled to have been severely damaged by aircraft from Ranger. During Fleet Problem XVIII in 1937, Saratoga, now under the command of naval aviation pioneer John H. Towers, covered an amphibious assault on Midway Atoll and was badly "damaged" by Ranger's aircraft.

The 1938 Fleet Problem again tested the defenses of Hawaii and, again, aircraft from Saratoga and her sister successfully attacked Pearl Harbor at dawn on 29 March. Later in the exercise, the two carriers successfully attacked San Francisco without being spotted by the defending fleet. Captain Albert Cushing Read relieved Towers in July 1938. During Fleet Problem XX in 1939, the carrier remained off the West Coast as part of Task Force (TF) 7 with the battleship Arizona and escorts under the command of Rear Admiral Chester Nimitz to maintain a presence in the Pacific. From 2 April to 21 June 1940, she participated in Fleet Problem XXI, and her aircraft, together with those from Lexington, "damaged" the carrier Yorktown in an early phase of the exercise. Shortly before the end of the fleet problem, Captain Archibald Douglas replaced Read as commanding officer.

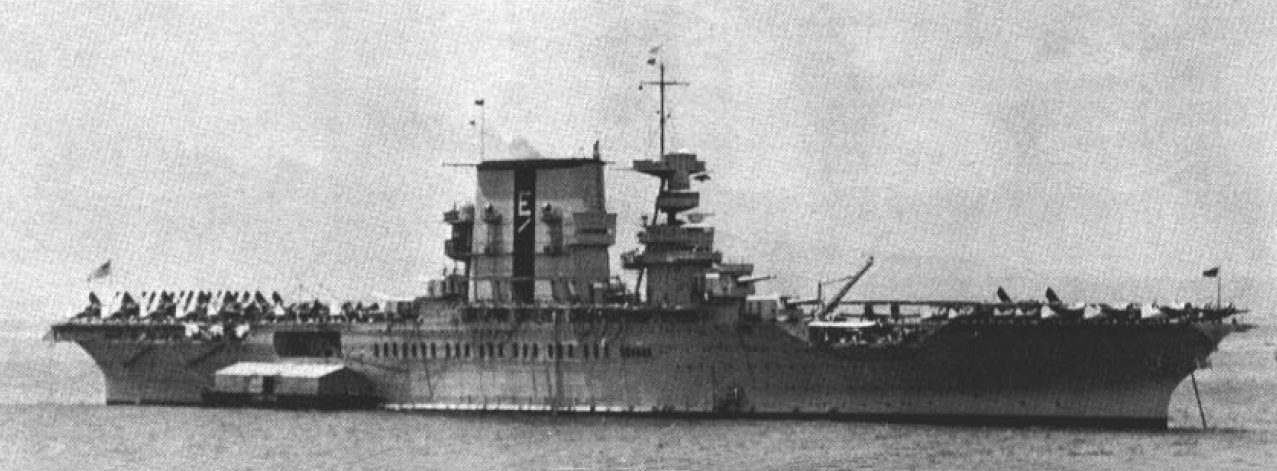
Saratoga at anchor in early 1941. The large "E" and hashmark on the funnel stripe represent the two times the ship was awarded by the Navy for "Engineering Excellence."

From 6 January to 15 August 1941, Saratoga underwent a long-deferred modernization at the Bremerton Navy Yard that included the widening of her flight deck at her bow and the installation of additional antiaircraft guns and a CXAM-1 radar. The ship began a refit a few days later that lasted until late November, further revising the anti-aircraft armament and adding an FC radar.

=== World War II ===
When the Japanese attacked Pearl Harbor on 7 December 1941, Saratoga was entering San Diego Harbor to embark her air group, which had been training ashore while the ship was refitting. This consisted of 11 Grumman F4F-3 Wildcat fighters of VF-3 (under the command of Lieutenant Jimmy Thach), 43 Douglas SBD Dauntless dive bombers of VB-3 and VS-3, and 11 Douglas TBD Devastator torpedo bombers of VT-3. The ship also was under orders to load 14 Marine Corps Brewster F2A-3 Buffalo fighters of VMF-221 for delivery in Oahu. The following morning the ship, now the flagship of Carrier Division One, commanded by Rear Admiral Aubrey Fitch, sailed for Pearl Harbor. Saratoga arrived at Pearl on 15 December, refueled, and departed for Wake Island the following day. The ship was assigned to Task Force (TF) 14 under the command of Rear Admiral Frank Jack Fletcher; VF-3 had been reinforced by two additional Wildcats picked up in Hawaii, but one SBD had been forced to ditch on 11 December.

She then rendezvoused with the seaplane tender Tangier, carrying reinforcements and supplies, and the slow replenishment oiler Neches. Saratoga's task force was delayed by the necessity to refuel its escorting destroyers on 21 December, before reaching the island. This process was prolonged by heavy weather, although the task force could still reach Wake by 24 December as scheduled. After receiving reports of heavy Japanese carrier airstrikes, and then troop landings, TF 14 was recalled on 23 December, and Wake fell the same day. On the return voyage, Saratoga delivered VMF-221 to Midway on 25 December. The ship arrived at Pearl on 29 December and Fletcher was replaced as commander of Task Force 14 by Rear Admiral Herbert F. Leary the following day. Leary made Saratoga his flagship and Fitch was transferred to a shore command that same day. The task force put to sea on 31 December and patrolled in the vicinity of Midway.

Saratoga, about 420 nautical miles (780 km; 480 mi) southwest of Pearl Harbor on 11 January 1942, was heading towards a rendezvous with USS Enterprise when she was hit by a torpedo fired by the I-6. The explosion flooded three of her boiler rooms, reduced her speed to a maximum of 16 knots (30 km/h; 18 mph) and killed six of her crewmen. The ship's list was soon corrected and she reached Pearl Harbor two days later. While undergoing temporary repairs there, her four twin eight-inch gun turrets were removed for installation in shore batteries on Oahu. Saratoga then sailed to the Bremerton Navy Yard on 9 February for permanent repairs. She embarked 10 Wildcats of the VF-2 Detachment and all of VS-3 with its Dauntlesses for self-protection on the voyage.

While under repair, the ship was modernized with an anti-torpedo bulge, her anti-aircraft armament was significantly upgraded and more radars were added. Douglas was relieved on 12 April and Saratoga was temporarily commanded by her executive officer, Commander Alfred M. Pride, until Captain DeWitt Ramsey assumed command a month later. Saratoga departed from Bremerton on 22 May, bound for San Diego. She arrived there on 25 May and began loading aircraft and supplies while waiting for her task force commander, Admiral Fitch, to arrive from the South Pacific. On 30 May Admiral Nimitz, now commander-in-chief of the United States Pacific Fleet, ordered Captain Ramsey to expedite his departure for Pearl Harbor, even if Fitch had not yet arrived. The ship sailed from San Diego on 1 June carrying 14 Wildcats of VF-2 Detachment and 23 Dauntlesses of VS-3; in addition she carried four Wildcats, 43 Dauntlesses and 14 Avengers as cargo. She arrived at Pearl Harbor on 6 June, the final day of the Battle of Midway. After refuelling, Saratoga departed the following day with the mission to ferry replacement aircraft to the carriers that survived the battle. The ship carried a total of 47 Wildcats, 45 Dauntlesses, 5 Devastators and 10 Avengers, including her own air group. Admiral Fletcher (whose flagship Yorktown had been sunk during the battle) came aboard on 8 June and made Saratoga his flagship. The ship rendezvoused with the other carriers on 11 June and transferred 19 Dauntlesses, the 5 Devastators and all of the Avengers to them. When the ship reached Pearl on 13 June, Fletcher and his staff disembarked; Admiral Fitch rendezvoused with the ship the next day. He became commander of Task Force 11 on 15 June, when Nimitz reorganized his carriers. From 22 through 29 June, Saratoga ferried 18 Marine Dauntlesses of VMSB-231 and 25 Army Air Corps Curtiss P-40 Warhawks to Midway Island to replace the aircraft lost during the battle. Fletcher relieved Fitch as commander of TF 11 the following day.

==== Guadalcanal campaign ====
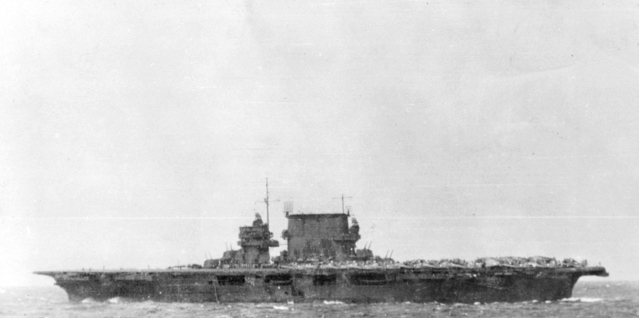
Saratoga operating off Guadalcanal

In late June 1942, the Allies decided to seize bases in the southern Solomon Islands with the objective of denying their use by the Japanese to threaten the supply and communication routes between the U.S., Australia, and New Zealand. They also intended to use Guadalcanal and Tulagi as bases to support a campaign to eventually capture or neutralize the major Japanese base at Rabaul on New Britain. Admiral Nimitz committed much of the Pacific Fleet to the task, including three of his four carrier task forces. They fell under the command of the recently appointed Vice Admiral Robert L. Ghormley, commander of the South Pacific Area.

On 7 July, Task Force 11 departed Pearl for the Southwest Pacific; it consisted of Saratoga, four heavy cruisers, Astoria, New Orleans, Minneapolis and Vincennes, and an escort of seven destroyers. Also assigned were three replenishment oilers and four fast transports converted from old four-stack destroyers. The carrier embarked 90 aircraft, comprising 37 Wildcats, 37 Dauntlesses and 16 Avengers. TF 11 and TF 18, centered around the carrier Wasp, rendezvoused south of Tongatapu on 24 July and they met the remaining forces, including Enterprise's TF 16, assigned to Operation Watchtower three days later south of the Fiji Islands. The entire force of 82 ships was organized as Task Force 61 and commanded by Fletcher. On 30 July, Saratoga and the other carriers provided air cover for amphibious landings on Koro Island and practiced air strikes as part of the rehearsals for the planned invasion of Guadalcanal, Tulagi, and nearby islands.

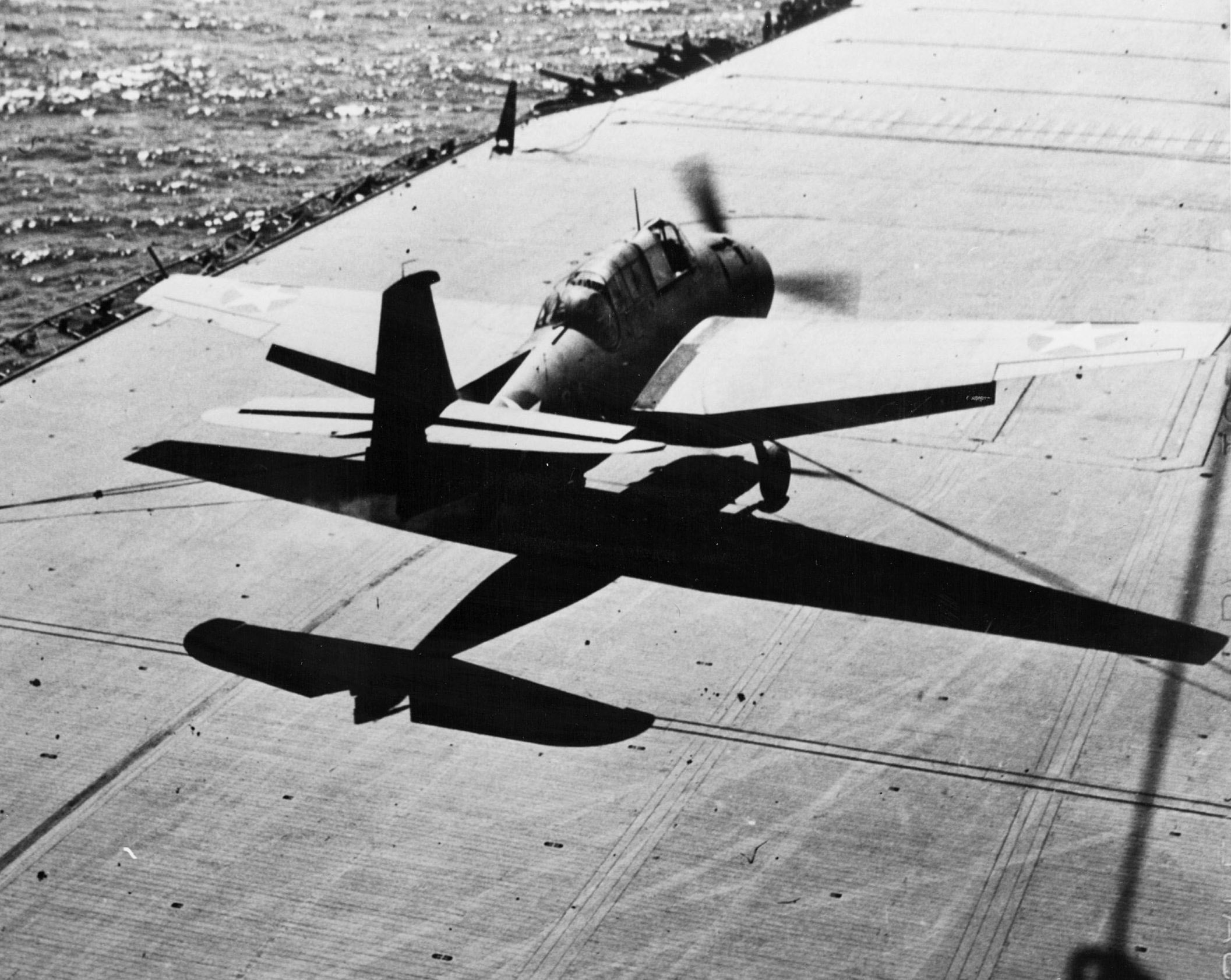
A damaged Grumman TBF-1 Avenger makes a landing aboard Saratoga in August 1942

The Allied force successfully reached the Solomon Islands without being detected by the Japanese because of thick fog and haze. Saratoga launched 24 Dauntlesses and a dozen Wildcats early on 7 August to attack targets on Guadalcanal. Her air group commander, Commander Harry D. Felt, coordinated the attack over the island, which also included eight Wildcats from Enterprise's VF-6. The aircraft focused on the nearly complete airfield at Lunga and dispersed the two construction battalions building it. This allowed the 1st Marine Division to capture it (renaming it Henderson Field) without resistance. For the rest of the day, the carriers provided a combat air patrol (CAP) over the transports and themselves while their other aircraft provided air support for the Marines as needed.

The Japanese struck back quickly and launched 27 Mitsubishi G4M ("Betty") medium bombers, escorted by 17 Mitsubishi A6M Zero ("Zeke") fighters, against the Allied forces. Among the escorting pilots were several aces such as Junichi Sasai, Toshio Ota, Hiroyoshi Nishizawa, and Saburō Sakai. Failing to spot the carriers, the bombers attacked the transports and their escorts, defended by eight Wildcats from Saratoga's VF-5. The Zeros shot down five Wildcats without losing any of their own, but the Americans shot down at least one G4M and damaged a number of others. The bombers failed to hit any Allied ships. About an hour later, nine Aichi D3A ("Val") dive bombers attacked the transport groups. Also based in Rabaul, they were on a one-way mission with a minimal payload of two small 130-pound (60 kg) bombs each because the distance to Guadalcanal exceeded their combat range; the pilots were expected to ditch at Shortland Island on the return leg where a Japanese seaplane tender could pick them up. By the time they arrived, the American CAP had been reinforced to 15 Wildcats from VF-5 and VF-6. Realizing that they had been spotted and that they could not reach the vulnerable transports before they were intercepted by the defending fighters, the Japanese attacked two of the escorting destroyers. They lightly damaged one destroyer with a direct hit, but the Americans shot down five of the attackers without loss to themselves.

The Japanese attacked the transports again the following day, but none of Saratoga's aircraft were involved. Concerned about his declining fuel reserves and worried about air and submarine attacks after losing 20% of his fighters, Fletcher requested permission from Ghormley to withdraw one day early to refuel. This was granted and Fletcher's carriers were mostly out of range by the morning of 9 August. This meant that they were out of strike range after a Japanese cruiser force sank four Allied cruisers that night. The transports still lacked air cover, but the only Japanese airstrike of the day specifically targeted the carriers and ignored the transports entirely. Fletcher loitered southeast of the Solomons, waiting for the Japanese carriers that signals intelligence told him were en route to be spotted. He rendezvoused with the aircraft transport Long Island on 19 August and covered her approach to Guadalcanal. The ship was carrying Marine aircraft for Henderson Field and successfully flew them off the next day. Fletcher returned to the Solomons on 21 August after escorting Long Island to safety and remained in the vicinity for the next several days to provide cover for two transports resupplying the Marines. American aircraft shot down several Japanese reconnaissance aircraft during this time and the Japanese concluded that one or more American carriers were operating southeast of Guadalcanal.

==== Battle of the Eastern Solomons ====
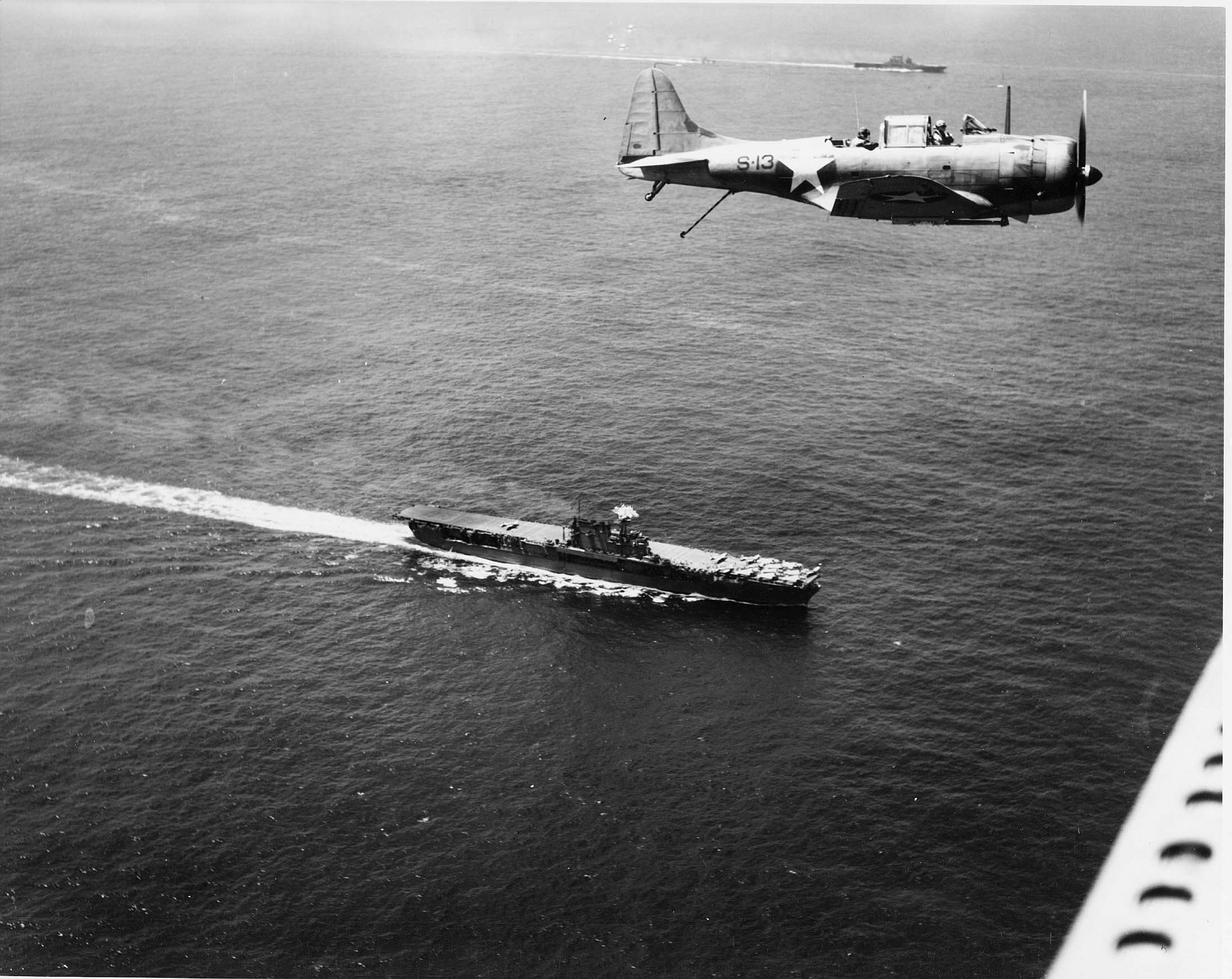
Enterprise (foreground) and Saratoga (rear) near Guadalcanal, December 1942, with a Douglas SBD Dauntless dive bomber visible between the two carriers

The presence of American carriers nearby firmed up Japanese plans to land troops on Guadalcanal on 24 August, covered by the fleet carriers Shōkaku and Zuikaku and the light carrier Ryūjō. A force of Japanese troop transports was detected on the morning of 23 August some 300 nautical miles (560 km; 350 mi) north of Guadalcanal. Fletcher was not originally inclined to attack them until another force of two transports was spotted at Faisi later that morning. He changed his mind and ordered Saratoga to launch her airstrike of 31 Dauntlesses and six Avengers in the early afternoon at very long range. They could not locate the Japanese convoy in poor visibility because it had reversed course shortly after spotting the American reconnaissance aircraft. The aircraft lacked the range to return to their carrier and they were ordered to land at Henderson Field and return the following morning.

The Japanese failed to locate the American carriers during the day and Vice Admiral Chūichi Nagumo, commander of the First Carrier Division, ordered Ryūjō, escorted by the heavy cruiser Tone and two destroyers, to attack Henderson Field, as per Admiral Isoroku Yamamoto's orders. American aircraft located the Ryūjō task force the following morning as it approached within aircraft range of Guadalcanal, as well as other enemy ships, but failed to spot the fleet carriers. Fletcher delayed his attack until further reconnaissance aircraft failed to find the other Japanese carriers and his own aircraft returned from Henderson Field. In the meantime, Ryūjō had launched her own airstrike against Henderson Field, although they inflicted little damage while losing seven out of 21 aircraft during the attack.

Saratoga launched an airstrike against Ryūjō's task force in the early afternoon that consisted of 31 Dauntlesses and eight Avengers; the long range precluded fighter escort. While those aircraft were en route, a number of reconnaissance aircraft from Enterprise spotted and attacked the Japanese formation. They inflicted no damage and the Japanese CAP shot down one Avenger. Saratoga's aircraft sighted the carrier shortly afterward and attacked. They hit Ryūjō three times with 1,000-pound (450 kg) bombs and one torpedo; the torpedo hit flooded the starboard engine and boiler rooms. No aircraft from either Ryūjō or Saratoga were shot down in the attack. The carrier capsized about four hours later with the loss of 120 crewmen.

About an hour after Saratoga launched her airstrike, the Japanese launched theirs once they located the American carriers. Shōkaku contributed eighteen D3As and nine Zeros while Zuikaku launched nine D3As and six Zeros. Reconnaissance SBDs from Enterprise spotted the 1st Carrier Division shortly after the Japanese airstrike had taken off and five of Shōkaku's Zeros stayed behind to deal with the Dauntlesses as they attacked Shōkaku. The Dauntlesses survived the attack by the Zeros, but their spot report was garbled and the enemy's location could not be understood. This incident prompted Nagumo to launch a follow-on airstrike with twenty-seven D3As and nine Zeros.

The first airstrike attacked the ships of TF 16 which was initially defended by fighters from VF-6. Once radar spotted the incoming Japanese aircraft, both carriers launched all available fighters. Enterprise was badly damaged by three bomb hits, but the Japanese lost nineteen dive bombers and four Zeros to the defending fighters and anti-aircraft fire. They claimed to have shot down a dozen Wildcats although the Americans lost only five, of which three belonged to VF-5; some of the American losses were reportedly due to friendly anti-aircraft fire. In turn, the American fighters claimed to have shot down 52 Japanese aircraft, 15 more than the Japanese committed to the attack. The second Japanese airstrike failed to locate the American carriers.

Right before the Japanese attack, Saratoga launched a small airstrike of two Dauntlesses and five Avengers to clear her flight deck and these planes found and damaged the seaplane tender Chitose with near misses that also destroyed three Mitsubishi F1M reconnaissance floatplanes. Two Avengers were forced to make emergency landings, but they shot down one Zero from Shōkaku. After recovering their returning aircraft, the two American carriers withdrew, Enterprise for repairs and Saratoga to refuel the next day. Before the former departed for Tongatapu for temporary repairs, she transferred 17 Wildcats and six Avengers to Saratoga as replacements for the latter's losses.

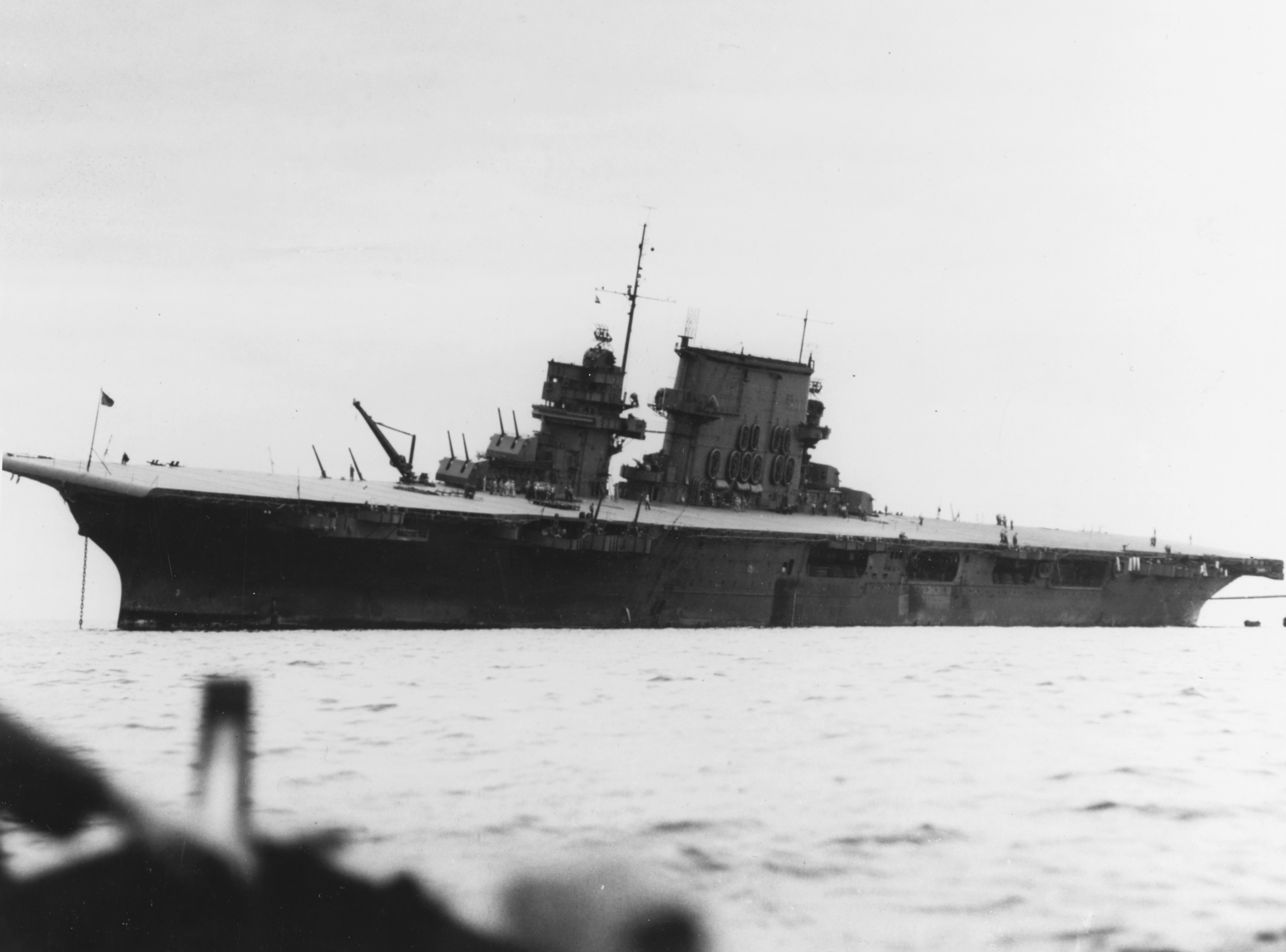
Saratoga under repair at Tongatapu after being torpedoed by I-26, September 1942

Fletcher rendezvoused with TF 18 east of San Cristobal on the evening of 26 August and transferred four Wildcats to Wasp the next day to bring the latter's fighters up to strength. TF 17, with the carrier Hornet, arrived on 29 August. Two days later, a torpedo from I-26 struck Saratoga on her starboard side, just aft of the island. The torpedo wounded a dozen of her sailors, including Fletcher, it flooded one fire room, giving the ship a 4° list, and it caused multiple electrical short circuits. These damaged Saratoga's turbo-electric propulsion system and left her dead in the water for a time. The heavy cruiser Minneapolis took Saratoga in tow while she launched her aircraft for Espiritu Santo, retaining 36 fighters aboard. By noon, the list had been corrected and she was able to steam under her own power later that afternoon.

Saratoga reached Tongatapu on 6 September. On the way there, as she passed down the east side of the New Hebrides, she flew off 27 Wildcats, including VF 5 squadron, for Efate. The ship received temporary repairs at Tongatapu and sailed for Pearl on 12 September, escorted by the battleship South Dakota, New Orleans and five destroyers. Task Force 11 reached Pearl on 21 September and Saratoga entered drydock the following day for more permanent repairs. Captain Ramsey was promoted on 27 September and replaced by Captain Gerald F. Bogan.

Task Force 11, now commanded by Rear Admiral Ramsey, sailed from Pearl Harbor, bound for Nouméa, New Caledonia, via Viti Levu, Fiji, on 12 November 1942 with Saratoga as his flagship. The other ships of the task force consisted of New Orleans, the fleet oiler Kankakee and six destroyers. The carrier had on board the Wildcats of VF-6, Dauntlesses of VB-3 and VS-6, and the Avengers of VT-3. The ships dropped anchor in Fiji on 22 November, except for New Orleans, which immediately left for Nouméa, escorted by two destroyers. The cruiser was replaced by the light anti-aircraft cruiser San Juan on 29 November and the task force sailed for Nouméa on 1 December. After they arrived on 5 December, one of Saratoga's main turbines required repairs which lasted until 13 December.

==== 1943 ====
On 23 January 1943, Saratoga launched 18 Wildcats of VF-3, 24 Dauntlesses of VB-3 and VS-3, and 17 Avengers of VT-3 for Henderson Field, retaining 16 Wildcats and 15 Dauntlesses for self-defense. The next day they attacked the Japanese airfield at Vila, Solomon Islands after it had been bombarded by four Allied light cruisers. The aircraft returned to the carrier without loss later that afternoon. Captain Bogan slipped and badly injured himself on 29 March so Captain Henry M. Mullinnix assumed command on 7 April.

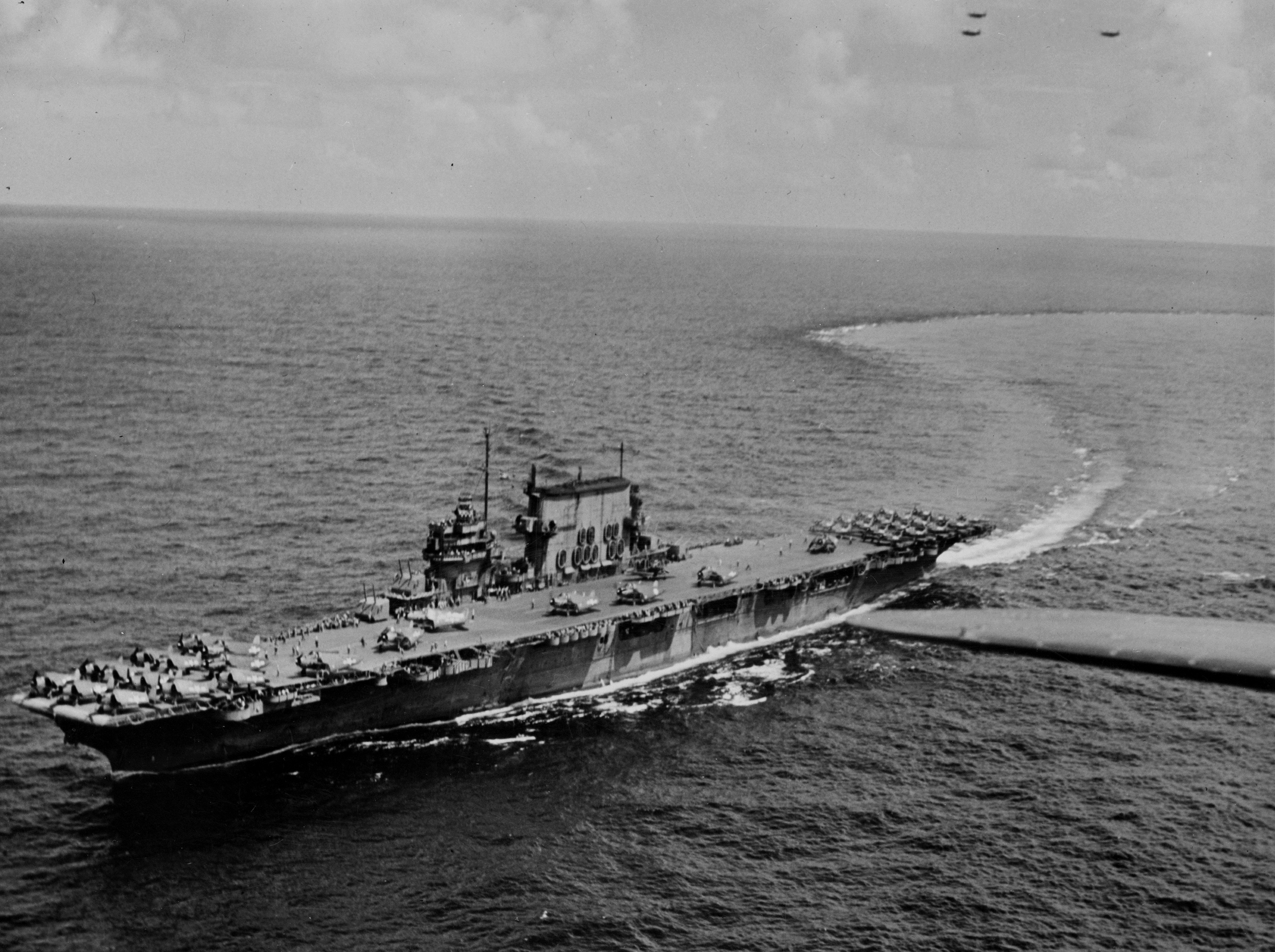
Saratoga in 1943 or 1944

With the withdrawal of Enterprise in early May, Saratoga became the only operational American fleet carrier in the South Pacific. Task Force 14, as her group was now known, was reinforced by the anti-aircraft cruiser San Diego on 3 May and by the British fleet carrier HMS Victorious on 17 May. At this time Saratoga embarked 34 Wildcats of VF-5, 37 Dauntlesses of VB-3 and VS-3 and 16 Avengers of VT-3 Ramsey's force was intended to provide distant cover for the impending landings on New Georgia and to prevent intervention by any Japanese carriers. The two carriers spent some weeks familiarizing each other with their capabilities and tactics and Ramsey decided to take advantage of each carrier's strengths. He ordered that the Avengers of 832 Squadron be exchanged for 24 Wildcats from VF-3 as Victorious had difficulty operating the large Avenger and the British carrier possessed better facilities for coordinating fighter operations than Saratoga; the latter retained a dozen Wildcats for self-defense and escort duties. Fortunately, Ramsey never got a chance to test his reorganization as the Japanese carriers made no effort to attack the American transports. Ramsey was relieved on 26 July and replaced by Rear Admiral Frederick C. Sherman. Victorious sailed on 31 July for home and left eleven Avengers behind as reserves for Saratoga.

Carrier Air Group 12 was assigned to Saratoga in lieu of Carrier Air Group 3 and flew aboard on 1 August. It was composed of VF-12, VB-12 and VT-12; the fighter and dive bomber squadrons each had 36 aircraft and the torpedo bomber squadron had half that number. Grumman F6F Hellcats replaced the Wildcats formerly used. The task force was redesignated as Task Force 38 on 4 August and Captain John H. Cassady relieved Mullinix on 22 August after the latter was promoted. The ship was based at Havannah Harbor, Efate and Espiritu Santo from August through November. While refueling at sea on the night of 12 October, Saratoga collided with the oiler Atascosa, damaging three of her 20-millimeter guns on her port side. On 22 October, she was joined by the light aircraft carrier Princeton.

On 27 October, Task Force 38 provided air cover for the invasion of the Treasury Islands, part of the preliminary operations for the invasion of Bougainville Island scheduled a few days later. On the morning of 1 November, Saratoga's aircraft neutralized Japanese airfields at the northern end of the island and on Buka Island. They destroyed 15 Japanese aircraft while losing three Hellcats, one Dauntless, and two Avengers to all causes. While the task force was refuelling on 3–4 November, reconnaissance aircraft discovered Japanese cruisers massing at Rabaul and Admiral Halsey ordered Task Force 38 to attack them with maximal force before they could engage the transports at Bougainville. This translated into an attack group of 23 Avengers and 22 Dauntlesses, escorted by every available fighter on board the two carriers on 5 November; CAP over the carriers was provided by fighters flying from New Georgia. The attack caught the Japanese by surprise and badly damaged four heavy cruisers, two light cruisers, and a destroyer for the loss of only nine aircraft to all causes.

Saratoga and Princeton attacked Rabaul again on 11 November in conjunction with three carriers of Task Group 50.3. They attacked first, but inflicted little damage due to poor visibility; the other carriers were more successful and further damaged the ships at Rabaul. Task Force 38 returned to Espiritu Santo on 14 November. Now known as Task Group 50.4, Saratoga and Princeton were tasked as the Relief Carrier Group for the offensive in the Gilbert Islands. As part of the preliminary operations, they attacked Nauru on 19 November, destroying two fighters and three G4Ms on the ground. As the carriers were withdrawing, they were unsuccessfully attacked by eight more G4Ms, shooting down half of their attackers. TF 50.2 was not attacked during the battle and Saratoga transferred a number of her aircraft to replace losses aboard the other carriers before departing for Pearl Harbor on 30 November. She arrived on 4 December and off-loaded her aircraft and stores before proceeding to San Francisco where she arrived on 9 December for a refit and augmentation of her anti-aircraft guns.

==== 1944 ====
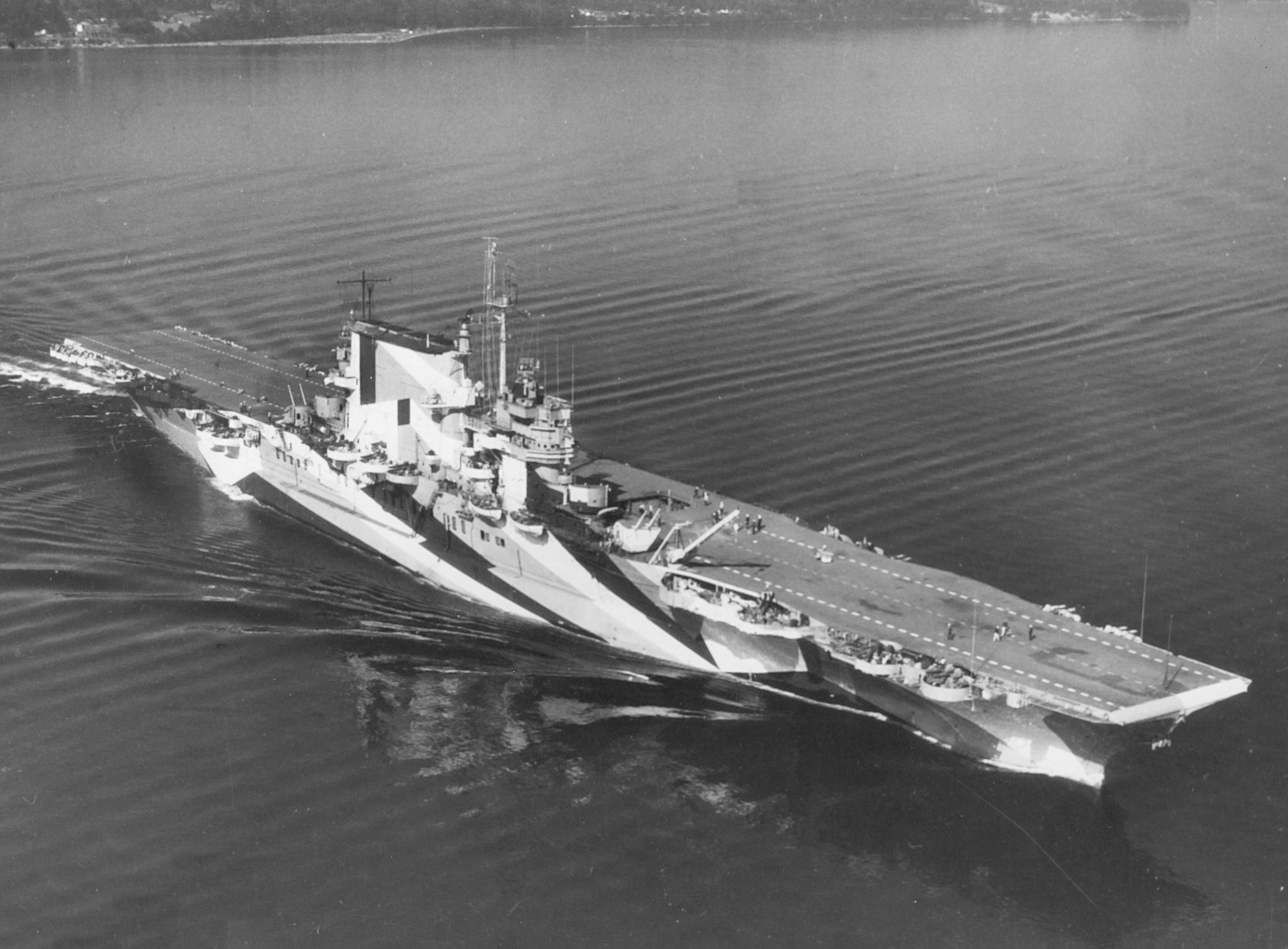
Saratoga in September 1944

Saratoga's refit was completed on 2 January 1944 and she arrived at Pearl Harbor on 7 January. The ship, now the flagship of Rear Admiral Samuel Ginder, commander of Task Group 58.4, sailed from Pearl Harbor on 19 January with Langley and Princeton, to support the invasion of the Marshall Islands scheduled to begin on 1 February. Her air group at this time consisted of 36 Hellcats of VF-12, 24 Dauntlesses of VB-12 and 8 Avengers of VT-8. As part of the preliminary operations, aircraft from the Task Group attacked airfields at Wotje and Taroa on 29–31 January, radio stations at Rongelap and Utirik Atoll on 1 February, and then attacked Engebi, the main island at Eniwetok Atoll, from 3 to 6 February, refuelled, and attacked Japanese defenses at Eniwetok again from 10 to 12 February. They provided air support during the entire Battle of Eniwetok which began on 17 February with landings at Engebi and continued until the islands were secured on 24 February. They then protected the Allied forces there until 28 February when land-based aircraft assumed that role.

On 4 March, Saratoga departed Majuro with an escort of three destroyers to reinforce the Eastern Fleet in the Indian Ocean for attacks on Japanese-controlled territory. (Note: This allowed the British aircraft carrier Victorious to remain longer in the North Sea and carry out an attack on the German battleship Tirpitz in Norway.) She rendezvoused at sea on 27 March with the British force and arrived at Trincomalee, Ceylon, on 31 March. During the next two weeks, the carriers conducted intensive training and rehearsing with the fleet carrier Illustrious for an attack on the port city of Sabang (Operation Cockpit) scheduled for 19 April. For this operation, Saratoga mustered 27 Hellcats, 24 Dauntlesses and 18 Avengers. The carrier launched 24 Hellcats, 11 Avengers and 18 Dauntlesses while Illustrious contributed 17 Fairey Barracuda bombers and 13 Vought F4U Corsair fighters. The attack caught the Japanese by surprise and there was no aerial opposition, so the escorts strafed the airfield and destroyed 24 aircraft on the ground. The port facilities and oil storage tanks were heavily damaged and one small freighter was sunk for the loss of one Hellcat to flak. The Japanese attempted to attack the fleet with three G4Ms as it was withdrawing, but the CAP shot down all three bombers. Sailing from Ceylon on 6 May, the task force attacked the oil refinery at Surabaya, Java, on 17 May after refueling at Exmouth Gulf, Australia. Little damage was inflicted on the refinery and only one small ship was sunk for the loss of one of VT-3's Avengers. Saratoga was relieved from its assignment with the British the next day and ordered back to Pearl.

The ship arrived at Pearl on 10 June and remained for several days before departing for Bremerton to begin an overhaul scheduled to last several months. Captain Cassady was relieved by Captain Thomas Sisson on 22 June although he was only briefly in command before Captain Lucian A. Moebus assumed command on 31 July. Saratoga completed her post-refit sea trials on 13 September and arrived at the Naval Air Station Alameda on 16 September to begin loading 85 aircraft, 1,500 passengers and cargo bound for Pearl Harbor. She departed San Francisco two days later and arrived on 24 September. The ship was assigned to Carrier Division 11 which was tasked to train night fighter pilots and to develop night tactics and doctrine. Rear Admiral Matthias Gardner made Saratoga his flagship on 10 October. Four days later, the ship was accidentally rammed by her plane guard destroyer Clark, gashing the port side of her hull. Operations were immediately cancelled and she returned to port for temporary repairs. Permanent repairs were made during a brief refit during the first week of November. Carrier qualification and other training continued through most of January 1945.

==== 1945 ====
On 29 January 1945, Saratoga departed Pearl Harbor for Ulithi Atoll to rendezvous with the Enterprise and form a night fighter task group (TG 58.5/Night Carrier Division 7) along with Enterprise, to provide air cover for the amphibious landings on Iwo Jima. She arrived on 8 February with the 53 Hellcats and 17 Avengers of Carrier Air Group (Night) 53 aboard and sailed two days later.

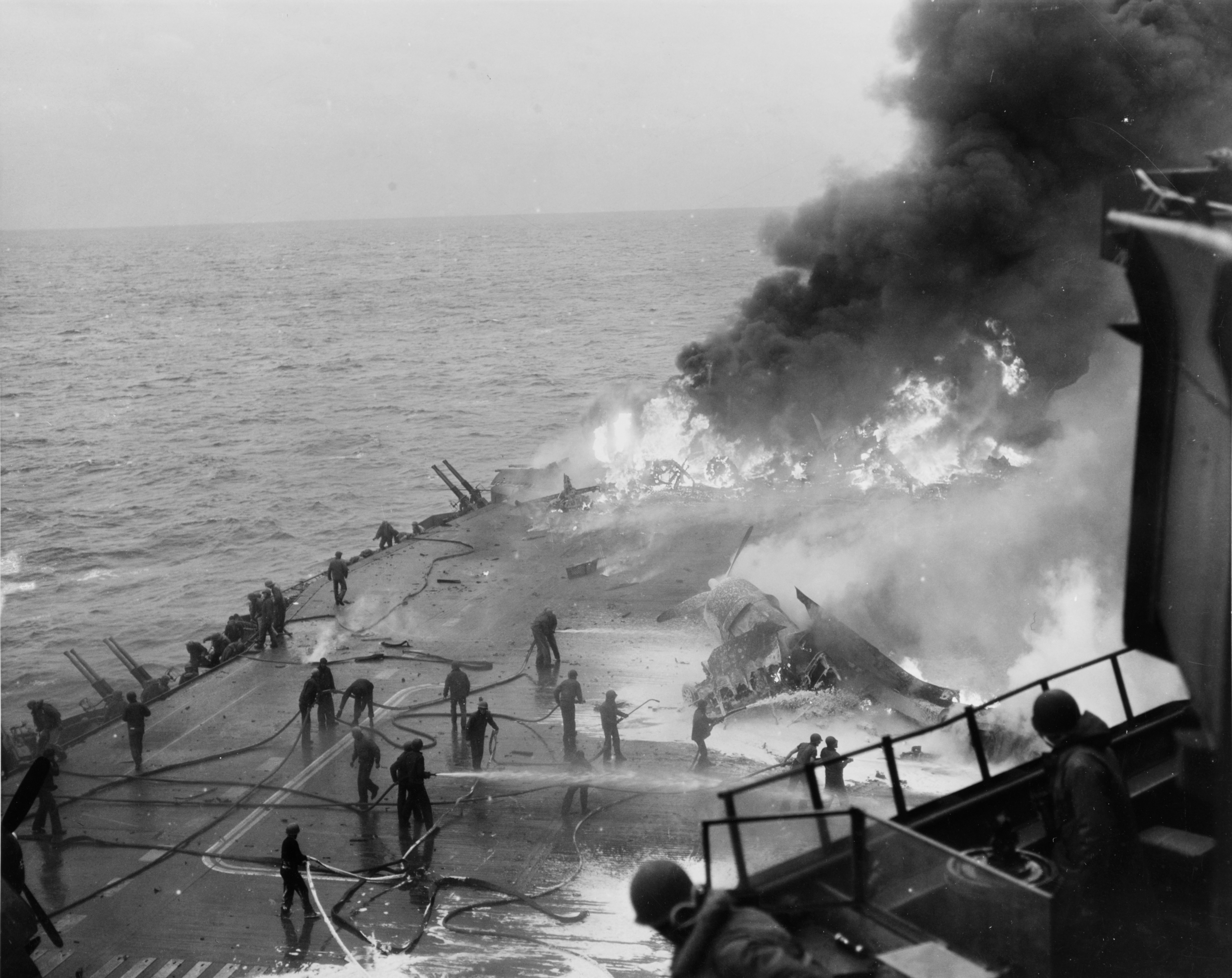
Saratoga after having been hit by a kamikaze, 21 February 1945

The carrier force carried out diversionary strikes on the Japanese home islands on the nights of 16 and 17 February, before the landings began. Saratoga was assigned to provide fighter cover while the remaining carriers launched the strikes on Japan, but in the process, her fighters raided two Japanese airfields. The force fueled on 18 and 19 February, and the ship provided CAP over Iwo Jima on 19–20 February. The following day, Saratoga was detached with an escort of three destroyers to join the amphibious forces and carry out night patrols over Iwo Jima and nearby Chichi Jima. Taking advantage of low cloud cover and Saratoga's weak escort, six Japanese planes scored five bomb hits on the carrier in three minutes; three of the aircraft also struck the carrier. Saratoga's flight deck forward was wrecked, her starboard side was holed twice and large fires were started in her hangar deck; she lost 123 of her crew dead or missing as well as 192 wounded. Forty of her aircraft were destroyed, including 31 Grumman F6F Hellcat fighters and 9 Grumman TBM Avenger torpedo bombers. Another attack two hours later further damaged her flight deck. Slightly over an hour later, the fires were under control, and Saratoga was able to recover six fighters. The ship was sent to Bremerton for permanent repairs, arriving there on 16 March.

Because of Saratoga's age and the number of modern carriers in service, the Navy decided to modify her into a training carrier. The aft elevator and its machinery were removed, the opening was plated over and the forward elevator was replaced with a larger model. Part of the hangar deck was converted into classrooms. While the ship was still under repair Captain Frank Akers assumed command on 27 April. The post-refit machinery trials on 12 May revealed some problems with one turbine, and an explosion in one 5-inch gun wounded eleven men and wrecked the mount. The full-power trials were completed on 20 May and a new mount was loaded aboard to be installed at Pearl. The ship sailed for NAS Alameda a few days later where she picked up 60 aircraft, 1,200 passengers and some trucks for delivery in Pearl. Saratoga arrived on 1 June and became the flagship of Rear Admiral Ralph F. Jennings, commander of Carrier Division 11. She resumed carrier qualification training on 3 June until she returned to the dockyard on 10 June for the installation of her replacement five-inch gun mount. She continued training carrier pilots after the Japanese surrender until 6 September.

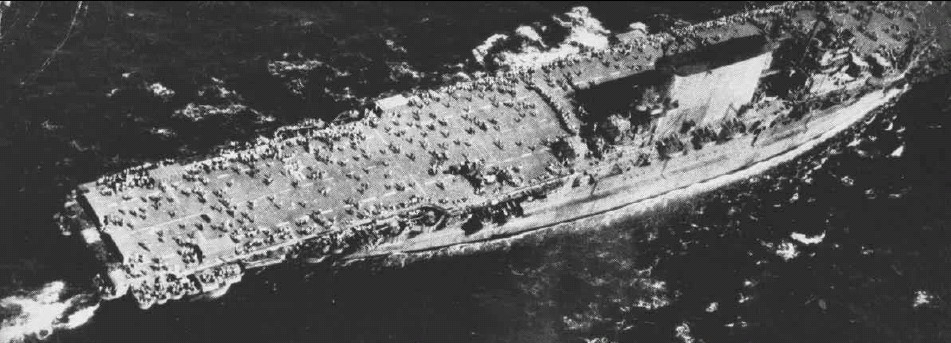
Saratoga during an Operation Magic Carpet voyage in 1945

Over the span of the ship's 17-year career, Saratoga's aviators landed on her deck 98,549 times, then the record for the most carrier landings. Saratoga received eight battle stars for her World War II service. After the war, the ship took part in Operation Magic Carpet, the repatriation of American servicemen from the European, Pacific, and Asian theaters. She left Hawaii on 9 September with 3,712 Navy officers and enlisted men bound for the United States. In the course of the operation, she returned 29,204 veterans, the highest total for any individual vessel.

=== Postwar years ===
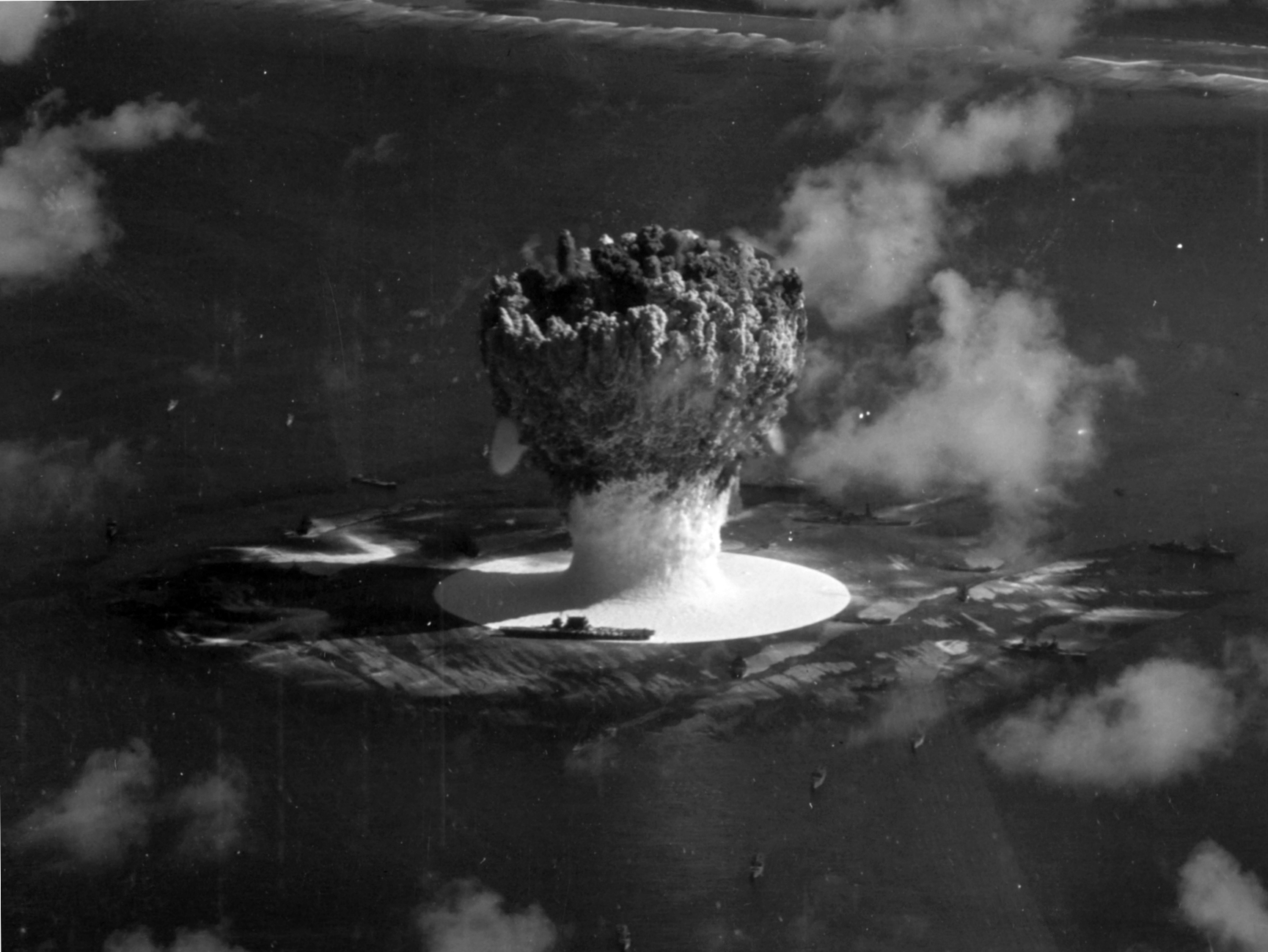
Saratoga (front) during the Baker detonation

Saratoga was surplus to postwar requirements with the large numbers of Essex-class carriers in service, and she was assigned to Operation Crossroads on 22 January 1946.

==== Operation Crossroads ====
This was a test conducted at Bikini Atoll to evaluate the effect of the atomic bomb on ships. Captain Stanhope Ring assumed command on 6 March, but was relieved on 2 June by Captain Donald MacMahan. The ship hosted comedian Jack Benny's radio show on 21 April, while Saratoga was berthed in San Francisco before her departure for Bikini. She headed out the Golden Gate on 1 May 1946.

Operation Crossroads began with the first blast (Test Able), an air burst on 1 July 1946. Saratoga survived the explosion with only minor damage, including the ignition of the teak of her flight deck. A skeleton crew boarded Saratoga the following day to prepare her for the next test on 25 July. The ship was sunk by Test Baker, an underwater blast which was detonated under LSM-60 400 yards (370 m) from the carrier. The force of the explosion lifted the vessel out of the water, knocked everything off her flight deck and knocked most of her funnel onto the flight deck. She was struck from the Naval Vessel Register on 15 August 1946.

In recent years, the submerged wreck, the top of which is only 50 ft (15 m) below the surface, has become a scuba-diving destination, one of only three carrier wrecks accessible to recreational divers (the others are the Oriskany, in the Gulf of Mexico, and HMS Hermes, off Batticaloa in Sri Lanka.) After a hiatus of several years, dive trips resumed in 2011.

== Awards and decorations ==
Saratoga received four campaign decorations for her service during the Second World War, with eight battle stars awarded for action in the Pacific.

American Defense Service Medal with "Fleet" clasp	American Campaign Medal	Asiatic-Pacific Campaign Medal with 8 stars	World War II Victory Medal
