= Atascosa =

Atascosa may refer to:

- Atascosa (moth), a genus of moth
- Atascosa County, Texas
- Atascosa, Texas
- Atascosa Mountains in Arizona
- Atascosa River in Texas
- USS Atascosa (AO-66)
