= Treaty for the Limitation of Naval Armament =

1920s treaties

The Treaties for the Limitation of Naval Armament were numerous accords in the 1920s signed variously by the United States, Great Britain, Japan, Italy and France. The treaties were an outgrowth of the Washington Naval Conference, held by the US in 1921–22.

One of the treaties, known as the Four Power Act (1921), provided that the US, UK, Japan and France would help maintain peace in the Pacific Ocean, while another, the Washington Naval Treaty (1922), also known as the Five Power Treaty, stipulated that the US, UK and Japan would build ships in a 5:5:3 ratio. This was originally proposed by American Secretary of State Charles Evans Hughes, and was rejected by the Japanese. Tokyo agreed, however, when a provision was added forbidding the US and UK to fortify their Pacific island possessions, but allowing Japan to do so. A third treaty, the Nine Power Treaty (1922), emphasized maintaining an Open Door Policy in China.

== Impetus ==
Following the unprecedented carnage – and expense – of World War I the popular mood throughout the globe was peace and disarmament, which reigned throughout the 1920s. At the end of the Great War, Britain still had the largest navy afloat but its big ships were becoming obsolete, and the Americans and Japanese were rapidly building expensive new warships. London and Tokyo were allies in a treaty that was due to expire in 1922 but a developing American-Japanese rivalry for control of the Pacific Ocean was a long-term threat to world peace. London realized it had best cast its lot with Washington rather than Tokyo. To stop a needless, expensive and possibly dangerous arms race, the major countries signed a series of naval disarmament agreements.

=== Washington Naval Conference ===
The most important gathering was the Washington Naval Conference, sponsored by President Warren Harding and run by Secretary of State Charles Evans Hughes. Harding demanded action in order to gain domestic political credit. It came about in the form of the Washington Naval Treaty of 1922.

==== Washington Naval Treaty ====
To resolve technical disputes about the quality of warships, the conferees adopted a quantitative standard, based on tonnage displacement (a simple measure of the size of a ship). A ten-year agreement fixed the ratio of battleships at 5:5:3—that is 525,000 tons for the USA, 525,000 tons for Britain, and 315,000 tons for Japan. The dominant weapons systems of the era—battleships—could be no larger than 35,000 tons. The major powers allowed themselves 135,000:135,000:81,000 tons for developing aircraft carriers, a new form of warship.

The Washington Conference avoided an expensive buildup by each power worrying the other two might be getting too powerful. The agreements forced the US to scrap 15 old battleships and two new ones, along with 13 ships under construction. Britain had to scrap ships too—indeed, more warships were “lost at Washington” than at any battle in history.

== See also ==
- London Naval Treaty
- Second London Naval Treaty
