= National Council for the Reduction of Armaments =

American coordinating body formed in 1921

The National Council for the Reduction of Armaments was the headquarters for the civic organizations that marshaled American public opinion to support the naval arms reductions at the Washington Naval Arms Reduction Treaty of 1922.

Cover from Literary Digest Magazine, anti-war coverage. October–December 1921

== Formation ==
The National Council for the Reduction of Armaments was the primary coordinating body for the pro-treaty social forces supporting the Washington Naval Arms Limitation treaty negotiations. This Conference was a result of a call made by the United States' government in July 1921. The conference met in Washington, DC for the purpose of negotiating limits to warship building and to settle diplomatic concerns in the Pacific and in China.

The National Council was composed of civic and religious organizations that were untied to build public support for the goals of the Washington Conference.

The Council worked in collaboration with other collectives to further the goals of the Conference, namely to reduce naval arms expenditures and bring stability to the Pacific.

== Washington Naval Arms Limitation Treaty ==
The 5-power treaty was one of the treaties that were signed at the conference. The delegations at the Conference were from the United States, Great Britain, Japan, France and Italy. The treaty stipulated the ratio of capital warships between the nations represented at the Conference and a ten-year 'holiday' in which building capital ships was prohibited.

After World War I there was a great deal of revulsion and fear throughout the United States regarding war. The experience of the waste and death from the war created a revulsion against war and the related spending on the military.

Newly elected president, Waren Harding had run as a Republican in 1920. His slogan was 'Return to normalcy.' Among the pressures that motivated Harding was to reduce spending on the army and navy. At the end of World War I there was an incipient naval arms race between the United States and Great Britain. Senator William Borah (Republican-Idaho), from the floor of the Senate successfully had a resolution asking the President to call for a conference to discuss naval arms reductions. The administration then issued invitations to Great Britain, Japan, France and Italy to negotiate naval arms reductions. Invitations were sent in July 1921. The delegates convened in Washington in November 1921. The discussions persisted through February and resulted in the Four power treaty and the five-power treaties. The former determined the construction of new battleships and battle cruisers.

== Mobilization to support the treaty ==
The National Council for the Reduction of Armaments was formed to support the negotiations in Washington for naval arms reductions. Furthermore, the Council was motivated to reduce the possibility for another war. They advocated for the reduction in government spending on armaments and war preparations. The inspiration for the formation of the Council was after the publication of a monography from the Council on Foreign Relations entitled: The League of Nations: What is it Good For? This argued that the League of Nations was deficient in regards to disarmament. The National Council for the Limitation of Armaments was founded after a meeting held on 8 September 1921, called by the Council on Foreign Relations to redress this failure of the League of Nations. Seventeen organizations attended this meeting, these included farmers' organizations, women's groups, Protestant, Catholic and Hebrew organizations, and the Quakers. In addition The National Education Association and the Union Against Militarism. The only labor organization represented was the Women's Trade Union League. The focus was on how to support the upcoming conference in Washington. It was determined that a coalition would act as the headquarters of groups that would support the effort to reduce naval spending.

In October 1921, Frederick Libby was appointed as the Executive Secretary of the National Council for the Reduction of Armaments. Libby was born in Richmond, Maine on 24 November 1876 and died in Washington, DC on 30 June 1974. After graduating from Bowdin College he taught locally and at the Philip Exter Academy. In 1919 he was a member of the American Friends Service Committee and the American Red Cross. He went to Europe to provide relief after World War I. He was horrified by the devastation. He was motivated to work for peace for the rest of his life.

The National Council for the Reduction of Armaments coordinated activities among the constituent organizations to support the negotiations in Washington. It also coordinated a speaker's bureau that provided speakers throughout the country to address mass meetings and exhort audiences to support the treaty negotiations. It also acted as a clearing house of literature supporting disarmament and arms production reduction. An important book that the Council promoted was Will Irwin's The Next War (1921). This book argued that if there is another war fought, given the new military technologies that developed in the war (submarines, airplanes and gas), a next war would result in the collapse of civilization.

The National Council organized surveys and petitions to support the naval arms reduction talks in Washington. The Council worked in coordination with allies in the Senate. In addition to Senator Borah they also corresponded with the Senatorial Advisory Committee. This committee was established to gauge public sentiment for the treaty negotiations. By 15 December 1921 this committee had received resolutions and correspondence from12,000,000 people. Overwhelmingly these supported naval arms reductions.

The National Council for the Reduction of Armaments was able to arouse and channel American public opinion to support the Washington Naval Arms Limitation Treaty. This treaty, known as the 5-power treaty passed the Senate without opposition on 6 February 1922.
