= Atascosa heitzmani =

Scientific classification
- Kingdom: Animalia
- Phylum: Arthropoda
- Class: Insecta
- Order: Lepidoptera
- Family: Pyralidae
- Genus: Atascosa
- Species: A. heitzmani

Binomial name
- Atascosa heitzmani J. C. Shaffer, 1980

Species of moth

Atascosa heitzmani is a species of snout moth in the genus Atascosa. It was described by Jay C. Shaffer in 1980, and is known from the US state of Missouri.

The forewings have a prominent white costal band with scattered reddish scales.
