= Atascosa verecundella =

Scientific classification
- Kingdom: Animalia
- Phylum: Arthropoda
- Class: Insecta
- Order: Lepidoptera
- Family: Pyralidae
- Genus: Atascosa
- Species: A. verecundella

Binomial name
- Atascosa verecundella (Hampson, 1901)

Synonyms
- Poujadia verecundella Hampson, 1901; Eumoorea anchridis Dyar, 1917; Poujadia cyttarella Dyar, 1914

Species of moth

Atascosa verecundella is a species of snout moth in the genus Atascosa. It was described by George Hampson in 1901 and is known from Colombia, British Guiana and Panama.
