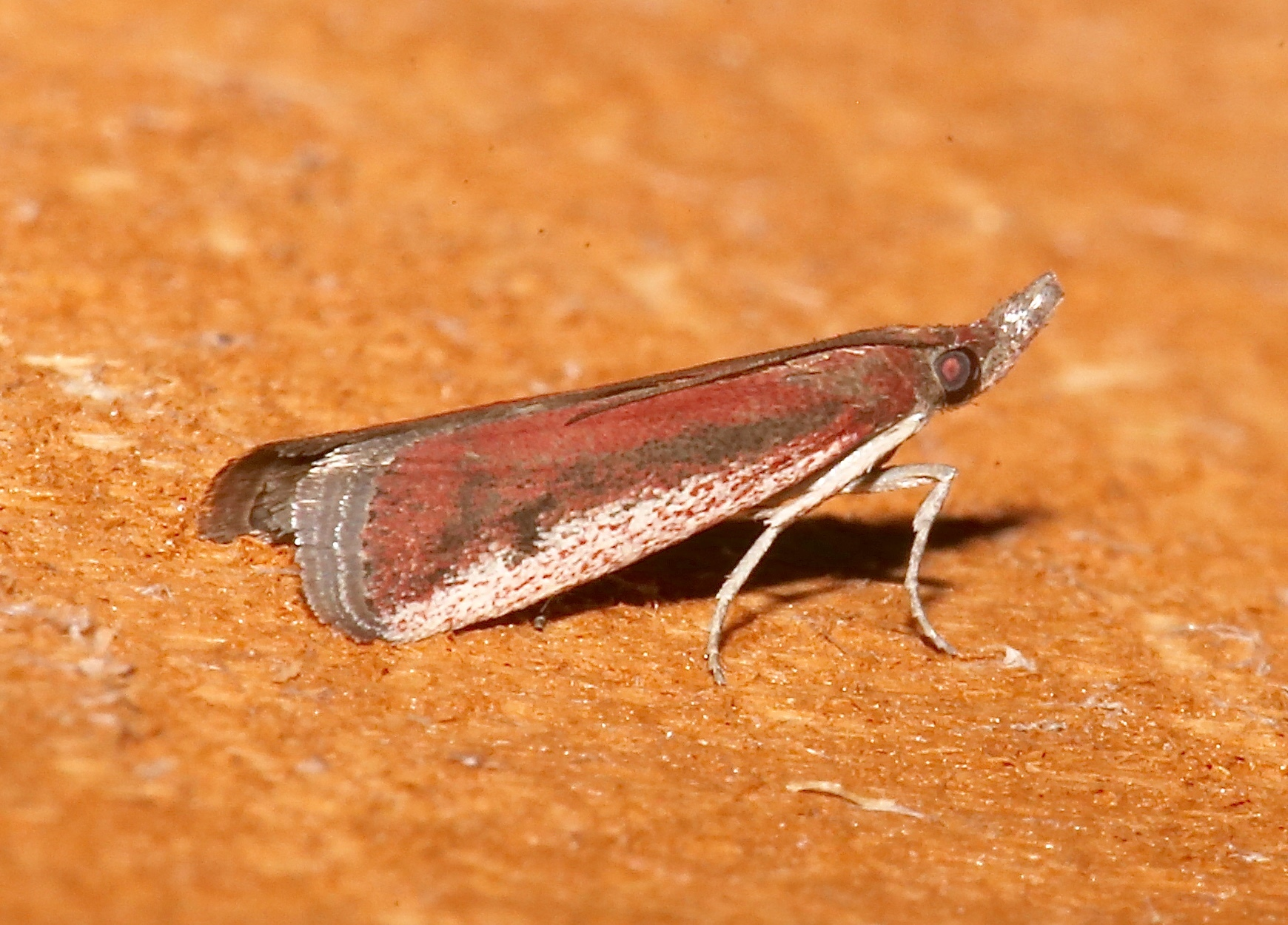
- Atascosa glareosella, Florida

Scientific classification
- Kingdom: Animalia
- Phylum: Arthropoda
- Clade: Pancrustacea
- Class: Insecta
- Order: Lepidoptera
- Family: Pyralidae
- Subfamily: Phycitinae
- Tribe: Anerastiini
- Genus: Atascosa
- Species: A. glareosella

Binomial name
- Atascosa glareosella (Zeller, 1872)

Synonyms
- Anerastia glareosella Zeller, 1872; Atascosa albocostella Hulstaert, 1900; Atascosa bicolorella Hulst, 1890

= Atascosa glareosella =

Species of moth

Atascosa glareosella is a species of snout moth in the genus Atascosa. It was described by Philipp Christoph Zeller in 1872 and is known from middle and eastern North America, including the United States and southern Canada.
