= Washington Naval Conference =

1921–22 disarmament conference in Washington D.C., US

- Part of interwar period / international naval arms control
- Opening session of the Washington Naval Conference at Memorial Continental Hall, November 12, 1921
Date	November 12, 1921 – February 6, 1922; 104 years ago
Location	Memorial Continental Hall, Washington, D.C., United States
- First international arms control conference in history

The Washington Naval Conference (or the Washington Conference on the Limitation of Armament) was a disarmament conference called by the United States and held in Washington, D.C., from November 12, 1921, to February 6, 1922. It was conducted outside the auspices of the League of Nations. It was attended by nine nations (the United States, Japan, China, France, the United Kingdom, Italy, Belgium, the Netherlands, and Portugal) regarding interests in the Pacific Ocean and East Asia. Germany was not invited to the conference, as restrictions on its navy had already been set in the Versailles Treaty. Soviet Russia was also not invited to the conference. It was the first arms control conference in history, and is still studied by political scientists as a model for successful disarmament movement.

Held at Memorial Continental Hall, in Downtown Washington, it resulted in three major treaties: Four-Power Treaty, Five-Power Treaty (more commonly known as the Washington Naval Treaty), the Nine-Power Treaty, and a number of smaller agreements. These treaties preserved the peace during the 1920s but were not renewed in the increasingly hostile world of the Great Depression.

== Background ==
At the end of World War I, the British still had the largest navy afloat, but its big ships were becoming obsolete, and the Americans and the Japanese were rapidly building expensive new warships. Britain and Japan were allies in a treaty that was due to expire in 1922. Although there were no immediate dangers, observers increasingly pointed to the American-Japanese rivalry for control of the Pacific Ocean as a long-term threat to world peace. By then, considering their colonial interests in Asia, the British decided that it was better for them to cast their lot with Washington than Tokyo. To stop a needless, expensive, and possibly dangerous arms race, the major countries signed a series of naval disarmament agreements.

The global appetite for peace and disarmament was aplenty throughout the 1920s. Women had just won the right to vote in many countries, and they helped convince politicians that money could be saved, votes won, and future wars avoided by stopping the arms race. Across the world, leaders of the women's suffrage movement formed international organizations such as the International Council of Women and the International Woman Suffrage Alliance. Historian Martin Pugh writes that they achieved the greatest influence in the 1920s, "when they helped to promote women's contribution to the anti-war movement throughout the Western world." In the United States, practically all the major Protestant denominations and highly visible Protestant spokesmen were strong supporters of international peace efforts. They collaborated to work to educate their local congregations on the need for peace and disarmament.

== Meeting ==
The American delegation, led by Secretary of State Charles Evans Hughes, included Elihu Root, Henry Cabot Lodge and Oscar Underwood, the last being the Democratic minority leader in the Senate. The conference's primary objective was to restrain Japanese naval expansion in the waters of the West Pacific, especially with regard to fortifications on strategically-valuable islands. Its secondary objectives were intended to obtain an ultimate limit to Japanese expansion and also an alleviation of concerns over possible antagonism with the British. They were to eliminate Anglo-American tension by abrogating the Anglo-Japanese alliance, to agree upon a favorable naval ratio vis-à-vis Japan, and to have the Japanese officially accept a continuation of the Open Door Policy in China.

The British, however, took a more cautious and tempered approach. Indeed, the British officials brought certain general desires to the conference: to achieve peace and stability in the West Pacific; avoid a naval arms race with the United States; thwart Japanese encroachment into areas under their influence; and preserve the security of Singapore, Hong Kong, and Dominion countries, but they did not enter the conference with a specific laundry list of demands. Rather, they brought with them a vague vision of what the West Pacific should look like after an agreement.

Japanese officials were more focused on specifics than the British, and they approached the conference with two primary goals: to sign a naval treaty with Britain and the United States and to obtain official recognition of Japan's special interests in Manchuria and Mongolia. Japanese officials also brought other issues to the conference: a strong demand to remain in control of Yap, Siberia, and Tsingtao as well as more general concerns about the growing presence of American fleets in the Pacific.

The American hand was strengthened by the interception and decryption of secret instructions from the Japanese government to its delegation. The message revealed the lowest naval ratio that would be acceptable to Tokyo; US negotiators used that knowledge to push the Japanese. This success, one of the first in the US government's budding eavesdropping and cryptology efforts, led eventually to the growth of such agencies.

The head of the Japanese delegation to the Washington Naval Conference was Prince Iyesato Tokugawa, who during the first four decades of the twentieth century led a political movement in Japan that promoted democracy and international goodwill with the U.S., Europe and Asia. His influence was significant in the negotiations and ratification of the Washington Naval Treaty.

== Agreements ==
US President Warren Harding called the Washington Conference a deal that all countries thought best for themselves. To resolve technical disputes about the quality of warships, the conferees adopted a standard based on the tonnage displacement, a simple measure of the size of a ship. A ten-year agreement fixed the ratio of battleships at 5:5:3: 525,000 tons for the US, 525,000 tons for Britain, and 315,000 tons for Japan. Smaller limits with a ratio of 1.67 applied to France and Italy. Battleships, the dominant weapons systems of the era, could be no larger than 35,000 tons. The major powers allowed themselves 135,000:135,000:81,000 tons for the newly-developed aircraft carriers.

While the admirals were unhappy, peace activists strongly supported the results and successfully worked for ratification. In the United States they included the World Peace Foundation; the American Association for International Conciliation; the Carnegie Endowment for International Peace; the Women's Peace Society; the Women's World Disarmament Committee; the Women's International League for Peace and Freedom, and the Federal Council of Churches of Christ in America.

The Washington Conference exactly captured the worldwide popular demand for peace and disarmament. Without an agreement, the US, Britain and Japan likely would have engaged in a naval arms race much like that experienced between Britain and Germany before the First World War. However, even with the restrictions, the agreement solidified Japan's position as a great power and was treated as a colonial power with equal diplomatic interests, a first for a non-Western nation.

The naval treaty was concluded on February 6, 1922. Ratifications of the treaty were exchanged in Washington on August 17, 1923, and it was registered in League of Nations Treaty Series on April 16, 1924.

Japan agreed to revert Shandong to Chinese control by an agreement concluded on February 4, 1922. Ratifications of the agreement were exchanged in Beijing on June 2, 1922, and it was registered in League of Nations Treaty Series on July 7, 1922.

== Results ==
The Washington Naval Treaty led to an effective end to building new battleship fleets, and the few ships that were built were limited in size and armament. Many existing capital ships were scrapped or sunk. Some ships under construction were turned into aircraft carriers instead.

Even with the treaty, the major navies remained suspicious of one another and briefly (1927–1930) engaged in a race to build heavy cruisers, which had been limited in size (10,000 tons) but not numbers. That oversight was resolved on value of cruisers by the London Naval Treaty of 1930, which specified a 10:10:7 ratio for cruisers and destroyers. For the first time, submarines were also limited, with Japan given parity with the US and Britain, at 53,000 tons each. (Submarines typically displaced 1,000–2,000 tons each.) The US Navy maintained an active building program that replaced obsolescent warships with technically more sophisticated new models in part because its construction yards were important sources of political patronage and so were well protected by Congress. During the New Deal, relief funds were used to build more warships. "The naval program was wholly mine," President Franklin Roosevelt boasted.

== Termination ==
The pacts and the treaties that resulted from the Washington Naval Treaty remained in effect for fourteen years. Japan ended participation in 1936.

== See also ==
- London Naval Treaty (1930)
- National Council for the Reduction of Armaments
- Second London Naval Treaty
- Anglo-German Naval Agreement

== Sources and further reading ==
- Buell, Raymond Leslie. The Washington Conference (D. Appleton, 1922) online
- Dingman, Roger. Power in the Pacific: the origins of naval arms limitation, 1914–1922 (1976)
- Dukes, Paul. The USA in the Making of the USSR: The Washington Conference 1921–22 and 'Uninvited Russia'. (Routledge, 2004).
- Earle, Neil. "Public Opinion for Peace: Tactics of Peace Activists at the Washington Conference on Naval Armament (1921–1922)." Journal of Church and State 40#1 (1998), pp. 149–69, online.
- Elleman, Bruce A. "The Washington Conference, 1921–1922." in International Competition in China, 1899–1991. (Routledge, 2015). 89–102.
- Fanning, Richard W. Peace and disarmament: Naval rivalry & arms control, 1922–1933 (1995) online
- Ferris, John. Armaments and allies: The Anglo-Japanese strategic relationship, 1911–1921 (Routledge, 2003).
- Field, Andrew. Royal Navy Strategy in the Far East, 1919–1939 (2004)
- Gibbs, Norman. "The Naval Conferences of the Interwar Years: A study in Anglo-American Relations" Naval War College Review 30#1 (Special issue Summer 1977), pp. 50–63 Online
- Goldman, Emily O. Sunken Treaties: Naval Arms Control between the Wars. (Pennsylvania State U. Press, 1994). 352 pp.
- Goldstein, Erik, and John H. Maurer, eds. The Washington Conference, 1921–22: Naval Rivalry, East Asian Stability and the Road to Pearl Harbor (Psychology Press, 1994) topical essays by experts.
- Hayashi, Mika. "Disarmament Debates around the 1899 Hague Peace Conference and the 1921–1922 Washington Conference: Community-Oriented Aspirations and Individual Security Concerns." Journal of the History of International Law/Revue d'histoire du droit international 1.aop (2021): 1–28.
- Jordan, John (2011). Warships after Washington: The Development of Five Major Fleets 1922–1930. Seaforth Publishing. ISBN 978-1-84832-117-5.
- Kaufman, Robert Gordon. Arms Control during the Prenuclear Era: The United States and Naval Limitation between the Two World Wars. Columbia U. Press, 1990. 289 pp.
- Kitching; Carolyn J. Britain and the Problem of International Disarmament, 1919–1934 Rutledge, 1999 online
- Louria, Margot. Triumph and Downfall: America's Pursuit of Peace and Prosperity, 1921–1933 (Cambridge University Press, 2001).
- McKercher, B. J. C. "'A Certain Irritation': The White House, the State Department, and the Desire for a Naval Settlement with Great Britain, 1927–1930." Diplomatic History 31.5 (2007): 829–863.
- O'Brien; Phillips Payson. British and American Naval Power: Politics and Policy, 1900–1936 (Praeger Studies in Diplomacy and Strategic Thought) (1998)
- Schenkein, Joshua. "Japan, The Great Power: Industrialization Through The Lens Of Zaibatsu." 2014 ASIN: B00NRHRMW2
- Seymour, Charles (1922). "Washington Conference" . In Chisholm, Hugh (ed.). Encyclopædia Britannica (12th ed.). London & New York: The Encyclopædia Britannica Company.
- Willoughby, Westel Woodbury. China at the Conference: A Report. Baltimore: Johns Hopkins Press, 1922.

=== Primary sources ===
- Papers Relating to Pacific and Far Eastern Affairs. U.S. Government Printing Office. 1922.
