= London Naval Treaty =

1930 international arms control treaty

International Treaty for the Limitation and Reduction of Naval Armament
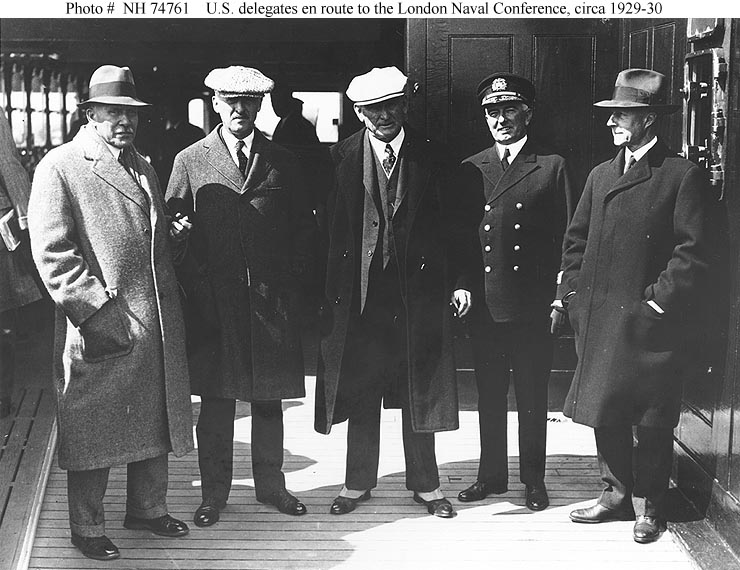
- Members of the United States delegation en route to the conference, January 1930
- Type: Arms control
- Context: World War I
- Signed: 22 April 1930
- Location: London
- Effective: 27 October 1930
- Expiration: 31 December 1936 (Except for Part IV)
- Negotiators: (United Kingdom) Ramsay MacDonald; (Empire of Japan) Wakatsuki Reijirō; (French Third Republic) André Tardieu; (United States) Henry L. Stimson; (Kingdom of Italy) Dino Grandi
- Signatories: (United Kingdom) George V; (Empire of Japan) Hirohito; (French Third Republic) Gaston Doumergue; (United States) Herbert Hoover; (Kingdom of Italy) Victor Emmanuel III
- Parties: United Kingdom; Japan; France; United States; Italy
- Depositary: United Kingdom of Great Britain and Northern Ireland
- Language: French and English

Full text
- London Naval Treaty at Wikisource

The London Naval Treaty, officially the Treaty for the Limitation and Reduction of Naval Armament, was an agreement between the United Kingdom, Japan, France, Italy, and the United States that was signed on 22 April 1930. Seeking to address issues not covered in the 1922 Washington Naval Treaty, which had created tonnage limits for each nation's surface warships, the new agreement regulated submarine warfare, further controlled cruisers and destroyers, and limited naval shipbuilding.

Ratifications were exchanged in London on 27 October 1930, and the treaty went into effect on the same day, but it was largely ineffective.

The treaty was registered in League of Nations Treaty Series on 6 February 1931.

== Conference ==
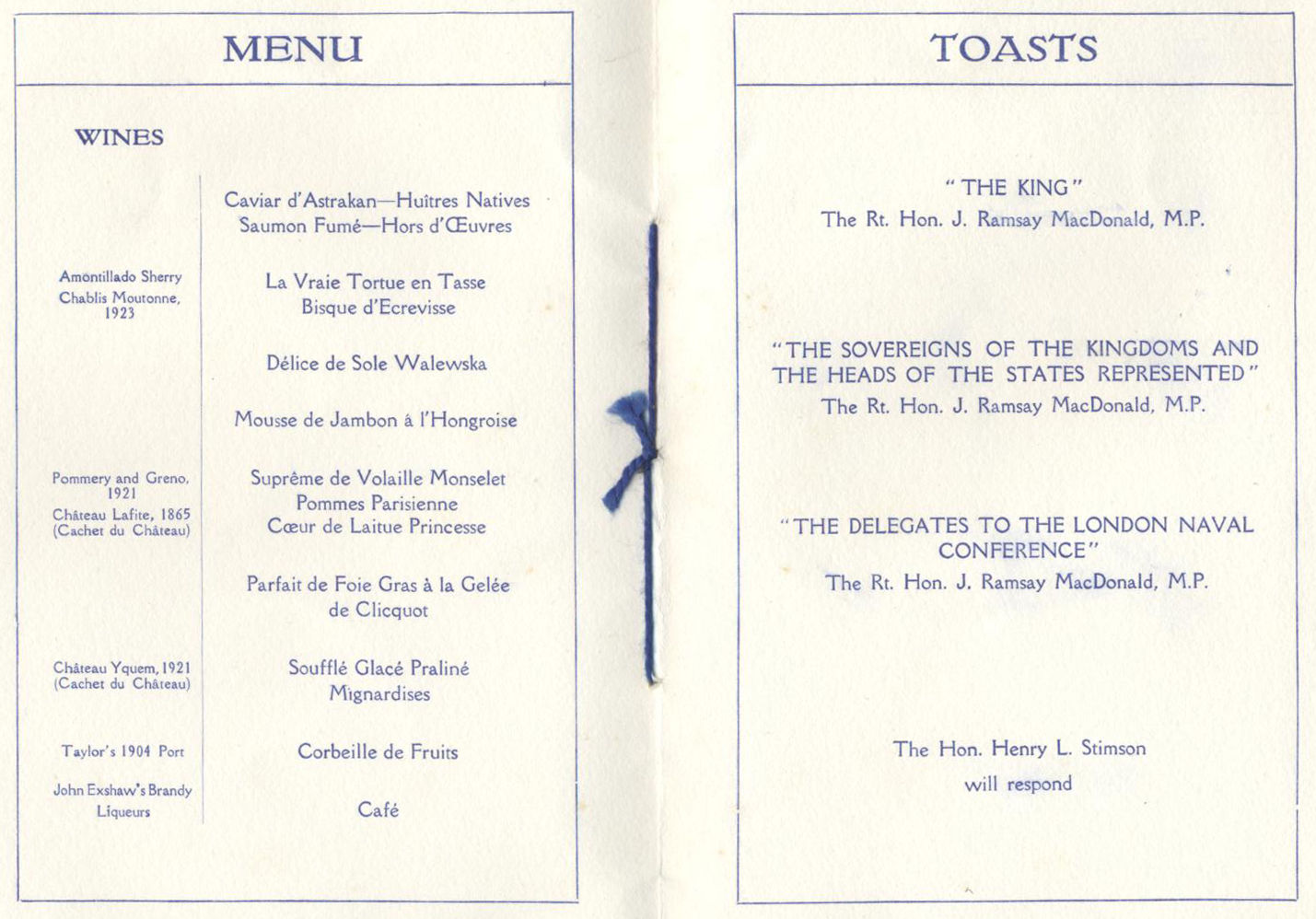
Menu and List of Official Toasts at formal dinner which opened the London Naval Conference of 1930

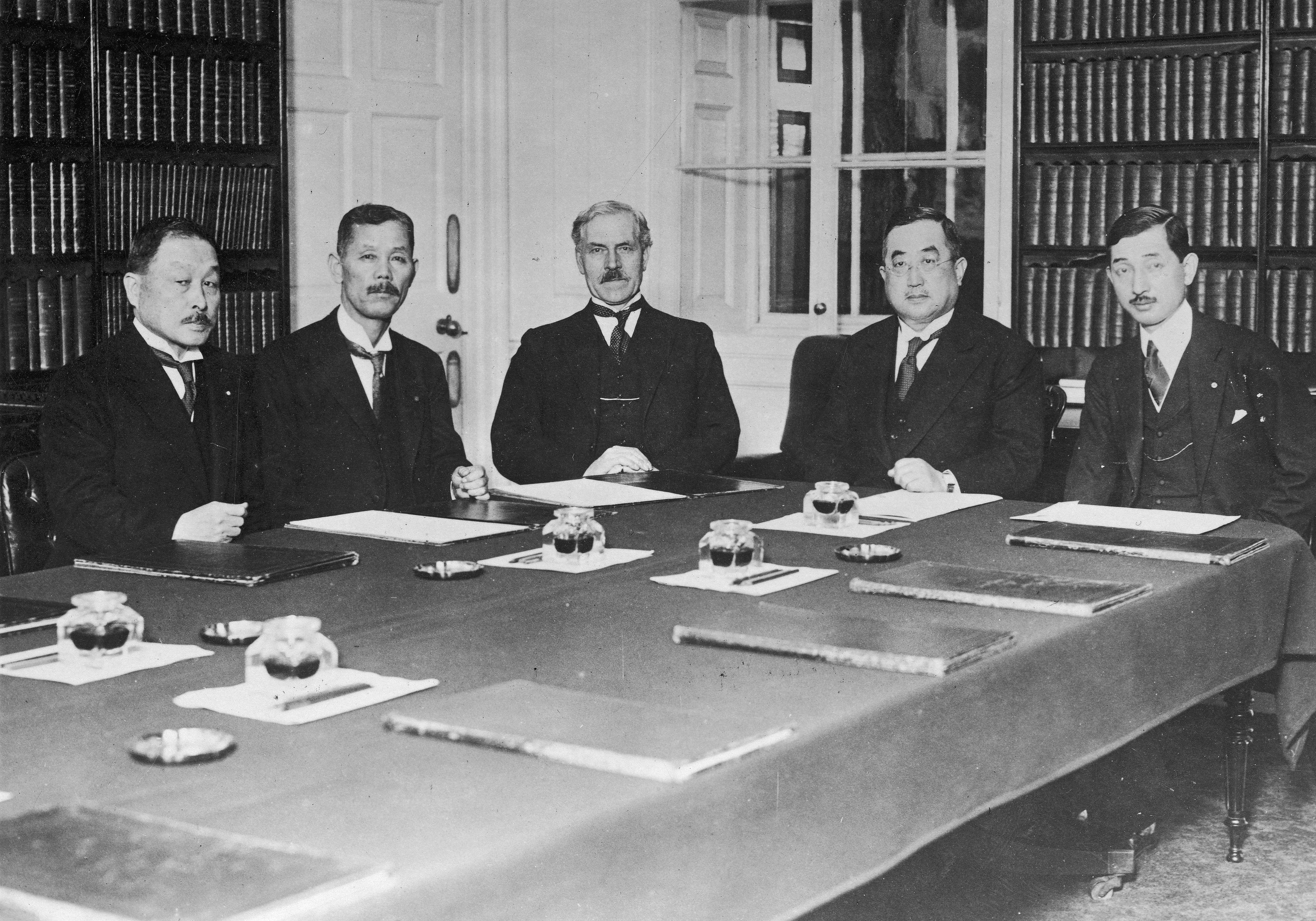
British Prime Minister Ramsay MacDonald with the Japanese delegation

The signing of the treaty remains inextricably intertwined with the ongoing negotiations, which began before the official start of the London Naval Conference of 1930, evolved throughout the progress of the official conference schedule, and continued for years afterward.

== Terms ==
The treaty was seen as an extension of the conditions agreed in the Washington Naval Treaty, an effort to prevent a naval arms race after World War I.

The conference was a revival of the efforts that had gone into the 1927 Geneva Naval Conference at which the various negotiators had been unable to reach agreement because of bad feelings between the British and the American governments. The problem may have initially arisen from discussions held between US President President Herbert Hoover and UK Prime Minister Ramsay MacDonald at Rapidan Camp in 1929, but a range of factors affected tensions, which were exacerbated by the other nations at the conference.

Under the treaty, the standard displacement of submarines was restricted to 2,000 tons, with each major power being allowed to keep three submarines of up to 2,800 tons except that France was allowed to keep one. The submarine gun caliber was also restricted for the first time to 6.1 in (155 mm) with one exception, an already-constructed French submarine being allowed to retain 8 in (203 mm) guns. That put an end to the 'big-gun' submarine concept pioneered by the British M class and the French Surcouf.

Per the terms of the treaty, Britain, the United States, and Japan reduced their number of capital ships, Japan by one, the United States by three, and Britain by five. Some were scrapped and others converted to auxiliary or training ships. All of these had been launched prior to WWI, and had smaller guns than most of the ships which were retained.

Battleships and battlecruisers to be scrapped or demilitarised under the London Naval Treaty
Nation	Scrapped or used as targets	Converted to training ships
United States	Florida; Utah	either Wyoming or Arkansas
United Kingdom	Marlborough; Benbow; Emperor of India; Tiger	Iron Duke
Japan	-	Hiei

The treaty also established a distinction between cruisers armed with guns up to 6.1 in (155 mm) ("light cruisers" in unofficial parlance) from those with guns up to 8 in (203 mm) ("heavy cruisers"). The number of heavy cruisers was limited: Britain was permitted 15 with a total tonnage of 147,000, the Americans were permitted 18, totalling 180,000, and the Japanese were permitted 12, totalling 108,400 tons. For light cruisers, no numbers were specified but tonnage limits were 143,500 tons for the Americans, 192,200 tons for the British, and 100,450 tons for the Japanese.

Destroyer tonnage was also limited, with destroyers being defined as ships of less than 1,850 tons and guns up to 5.1 in (130 mm). The Americans and the British were permitted up to 150,000 tons and Japan 105,500 tons.

Article 22 relating to submarine warfare declared international law applied to them as to surface vessels. Also, merchant vessels that demonstrated "persistent refusal to stop" or "active resistance" could be sunk without the ship's crew and passengers being first delivered to a "place of safety".

Article 8 outlined smaller surface combatants. Ships between 600 and 2,000 tons, with guns not exceeding 6 in (152 mm) with a maximum of four gun mounts above 3 in (76 mm) without torpedo armament and up to 20 kn (37 km/h), were exempt from tonnage limitations. The maximum specifications were designed around the French Bougainville-class avisos, which were in construction at the time.

Warships under 600 tons were also completely exempt. That led to creative attempts to use the unlimited nature of the exemption with the Italian Spica-class torpedo boats, Japanese Chidori-class torpedo boats, French La Melpomène-class torpedo boats and British Kingfisher-class sloops.

== Aftermath ==
The next phase of attempted naval arms control was the Second Geneva Naval Conference in 1932. Active negotiations among the other treaty signatories continued during the following years.

That was followed by the Second London Naval Treaty of 1936.

== See also ==
- Treaty for the Limitation of Naval Armament
- Washington Naval Treaty
- Second London Naval Treaty – List of treaties signed in London.
- Treaty of London – List of treaties signed in London.
- May 15 Incident – attempted coup in Japan
