= Atascosa (moth) =

Scientific classification
- Kingdom: Animalia
- Phylum: Arthropoda
- Class: Insecta
- Order: Lepidoptera
- Family: Pyralidae
- Subfamily: Phycitinae
- Tribe: Anerastiini
- Genus: Atascosa; Hulst, 1890

Synonyms
- Eumoorea Dyar, 1917

Genus of moths

Atascosa is a genus of snout moths. It was described by George Duryea Hulst in 1890 and is known from the US state of Texas and Colombia.

== Species ==
- Atascosa glareosella (Zeller, 1872)
- Atascosa heitzmani Shaffer, 1980
- Atascosa verecundella (Hampson, 1901)
