= Four-Power Treaty =

1921 treaty between the United States, United Kingdom, France, and Japan

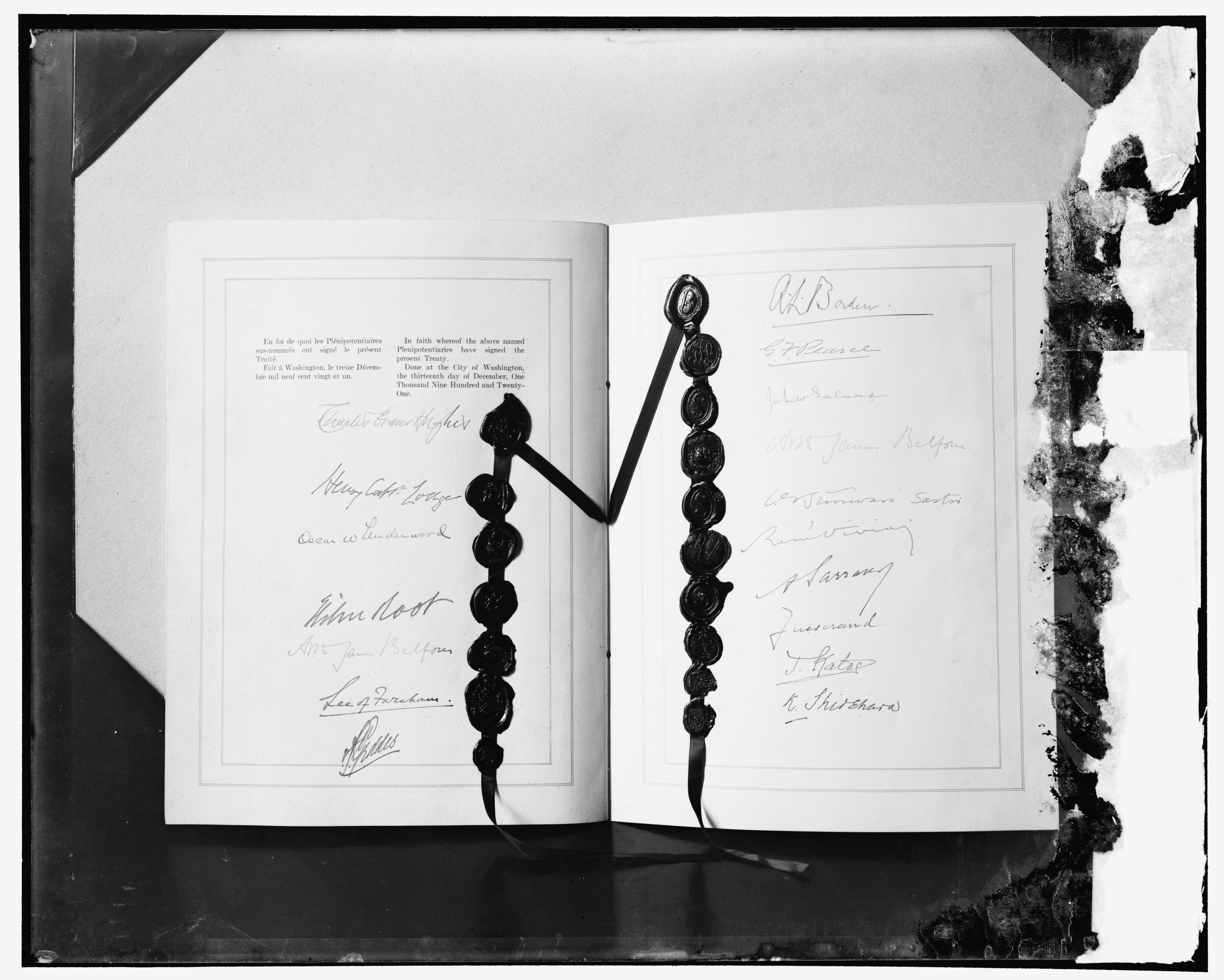
First page of the treaty

The Four-Power Treaty (四カ国条約, Shi-ka-koku Jōyaku) was a treaty signed by the United States, the United Kingdom, France and Japan at the Washington Naval Conference on 13 December 1921. It was partly a follow-up to the Lansing-Ishii Treaty, signed between the U.S. and Japan. This Treaty related to the Treaty for the Limitation of Naval Armament that attempted to maintain peace in the Pacific. It was signed in Washington, D.C., on 13 December 1921.

By the Four-Power Treaty, all parties agreed to maintain the status quo in the Pacific by respecting the Pacific territories of the other countries, signing the agreement, not seeking further territorial expansion, and mutual consultation with each other in the event of a dispute over territorial possessions. However, the main result of the Four-Power Treaty was the termination of the Anglo-Japanese Alliance of 1902.

The powers agreed to respect each other’s Pacific island dependencies for ten years.
