= USS Atascosa =

History

United States
- Ordered: as SS Esso Columbia
- Laid down: 30 April 1942
- Launched: 7 September 1942
- Acquired: 12 October 1942
- Commissioned: 9 November 1942
- Decommissioned: 21 January 1946
- Stricken: 7 February 1946
- Fate: Scrapped (date unknown)

General characteristics
- Displacement: 5,730 t.(lt) 24,660 t.(fl)
- Length: 547 ft 3 in (166.80 m)
- Beam: 70 ft (21 m)
- Draught: 31 ft (9.4 m)
- Propulsion: GE turbo-electric, single propeller, 6,000 shp
- Speed: 15.5 knots (28.7 km/h).
- Capacity: 156,000 barrels (24,800 m^{3})
- Complement: 281
- Armament: one single 5 in (130 mm) dual purpose gun mount, four single 3 in (76 mm) dual purpose gun mounts, four twin 40 mm gun mounts, four twin 20 mm gun mounts

USS Atascosa (AO-66) was an Atascosa-class fleet oiler acquired by the United States Navy for use in World War II. She had the dangerous task of supplying fuel and ammunition to ships in and near, combat areas in both the Atlantic Ocean and the Pacific Ocean.

SS Esso Columbia II was built at Chester, Pennsylvania, by the Sun Shipbuilding and Dry Dock Co. for the Standard Oil Company of New Jersey; launched on 7 September 1942; sponsored by Mrs. Harold G. McAvenia; renamed by the Navy Atascosa and designated AO-66 on 16 September 1942; purchased by the Navy on 12 October 1942: and commissioned on 9 November 1942.

== World War II North Atlantic operations ==
Following her commissioning at Baltimore, Maryland, the oiler sailed to Hampton Roads, Virginia, where she arrived on 19 November. At the conclusion of a month of trials, she got underway on 19 December for Port Arthur, Texas, where she took on a cargo of fuel oil and gasoline and then returned to Norfolk, Virginia, on 3 January 1943.

After a two-day respite, Atascosa left the East Coast of the United States, bound for Bermuda. She spent one week there before sailing back into Norfolk on 16 January. Atascosa made another run to Port Arthur for more oil and discharged that cargo at Norfolk before entering a drydock at the Norfolk Navy Yard for a brief period of repairs. When the oiler was refloated, she began preparations for a deployment to the Pacific.

== Transfer to the Pacific Fleet ==
Atascosa left Norfolk on 19 March and, after stops at Galveston, Texas, and Baytown, Texas, transited the Panama Canal on 4 April. Her ultimate destination was Nouméa, New Caledonia, which she reached on 28 April. The oiler discharged her cargo and then loaded more fuel oil and aviation gasoline to be taken to Samoa. She arrived at Pago Pago on 4 May, but left the next day, bound for the United States, and reached San Pedro, Los Angeles, on 28 May. There, she took on a cargo of petroleum and aircraft for transportation to Suva, Fiji Islands, and Nouméa, New Caledonia. More shuttling between the West Coast of the United States and these ports and the west coast occupied June, July, and August. In early September, Atascosa left Nouméa and set course for Espiritu Santo, New Hebrides. She arrived there on 9 September and began her duties fueling various ships of the fleet. In October, the oiler added Tulagi and Guadalcanal in the Solomon Islands to her fueling stops. She broke this routine somewhat by a trip to Nandi Bay in the Fiji Islands, where she arrived on Christmas Eve 1943. After delivering fuel and supplies, she again got underway on 11 January 1944 to return to Espiritu Santo.

== Searching for survivors in the water ==
Atascosa put to sea on 15 February to rendezvous with Rear Admiral Merrill's Task Force (TF) 39. She fueled three cruisers and four destroyers at sea before returning to Purvis Bay. A second fueling rendezvous with TF 39 took place on 6 March. The oiler stopped briefly at Purvis Bay, then went to Espiritu Santo on 15 March to begin preparations to rendezvous with a part of TF 58. The meeting occurred at sea on 26 March. Shortly after midnight on the morning of 28 March, Atascosa was informed that a Liberator bomber had gone down in the vicinity of the fueling group, and she began a search for its crew. Observers on the oiler spotted a life raft, but it proved to be unoccupied, and Atascosa soon terminated her rescue efforts.

== Approached by a Japanese aircraft ==
On 29 March, she was servicing units of Destroyer Divisions 93 and 94 when a Japanese plane closed the group. After Atascosa fired two rounds at the intruder, the plane quickly departed. The rest of her mission passed without incident, and Atascosa retired to Espiritu Santo on 5 April.

== Stateside overhaul ==
On 21 May, Atascosa left New Caledonia, bound for the west coast. She arrived at Terminal Island, California, on 7 June to undergo a routine overhaul and repairs. The yard work was completed on 22 July, and the ship got underway to return to her wartime duties. She touched briefly at Pearl Harbor before finally arriving at Eniwetok on 11 August. There, she unloaded her deck cargo and serviced a number of destroyers. Standing out to sea on the 17th, the ship fueled battleships Iowa (BB-61), Indiana (BB-58), and Alabama (BB-60). At a rendezvous with the fast carrier task force between Rota and Guam on 4 September, Atascosa serviced several destroyers and aircraft carrier Enterprise (CV-6).

== Fueling during adverse weather ==
Air alerts interrupted the oiler's routine at Saipan between the 5th and the 9th, before she steamed to Guam. During September Atascosa fueled many units of task force TF 38. She made stops at Saipan and Eniwetok before arriving at Ulithi on 13 October. She got underway again on 21 October to rendezvous with TG 30.8 in an area east of Luzon. The oiler was fueling task force TF 38.3 in early November when she encountered high, seas and increasingly strong winds. During the operation, hose lines between ships were carried away several times. On 7 November, while fueling Langley (CVL-27), the steel manifold on the after port 6-inch connection was carried away, forcing the suspension of operations. Six members of Atascosa's crew were injured while making and tending gasoline connections. The weather abated on 9 November, allowing the oiler's crew to make temporary repairs so that fueling could be resumed. Atascosa put into port at Ulithi on 17 November. She sailed on 10 December to meet fast carrier forces off Cape Engaño and again encountered heavy seas. This soon developed into a typhoon; and, by 18 December, visibility was reduced to zero. The next day, the weather had improved enough to allow fueling to resume. Atascosa returned to Ulithi on 23 December for the Christmas holidays.

== Fueling the fleet at Okinawa ==
During January and February 1945, Atascosa supported the operations of TG 30.8 and made several meetings with TF 58. She dropped anchor at Ulithi on 3 March for repair work. The ships of TF 58 left Ulithi several days before Atascosa departed on 19 March to support their attacks on the Japanese homeland. Her next assignment was to fuel the ships of TG 50.8, which were anchored off Okinawa. Atascosa returned to Ulithi on 1 May to undergo repairs and to replenish supplies. In mid-June, Atascosa set her course for Okinawa, where she remained for a month. After a brief supply stop at Ulithi, the oiler put to sea on 8 August to rendezvous with TF 38 off southern Honshū. While engaged in this mission, she received word of Japan's capitulation.

== End-of-war activity ==
Atascosa returned to Ulithi on 31 August. However, her service in the Pacific had not yet ended, as she left on 8 September to steam to Tokyo Bay. She remained in Japan until 24 September, then sailed to San Pedro, Los Angeles. The oiler arrived back in the United States on 8 October.

== Post-war decommissioning ==
Atascosa was decommissioned on 21 January 1946 at Mare Island, California; her name was struck from the Navy list on 7 February; and she was transferred to the United States Maritime Commission on 1 July 1946.

Sold to the Standard Oil Company of New Jersey in 1947 and renamed SS Esso Syracuse, she transferred to Panamanian registry in 1950 but continued serving as SS Esso Syracuse until scrapped at Genoa 1960. 329-foot (100 m) forward part grafted to 274-foot (84 m) after part of SS Esso Buffalo which became bulk carrier SS Spitfire and was scrapped 1973.

== Military honors and awards ==
Atascosa was authorized the following campaign medals:

- American Campaign Medal
- Asiatic-Pacific Campaign Medal (1)
- World War II Victory Medal
- Navy Occupation Service Medal (with Asia clasp)
