= List of Australian multilateral treaties (before 1975) =

This is a list of multilateral treaties entered into by Australia before 1975.

== Pre-federation multilateral treaties ==
Treaties prior to federation signed by the British Empire, adopted by Australia, and active on or after federation:

- 1856 – Declaration respecting Maritime Law (Paris, 16 April 1856)
- 1868 – Declaration renouncing the Use, in Time of War, of Explosive Projectiles under 400 Grams Weight (St Petersburg, 11 December 1868)
- 1884 – Convention for the Protection of Submarine Telegraph Cables (Paris, 14 March 1884)
- 1886 – Convention for the Creation of an International Union for the Protection of Literary and Artistic Works, Additional Article and Final Protocol (Berne, 9 September 1886)
- 1888 – Convention respecting the Free Navigation of the Suez Maritime Canal (Constantinople, 29 October 1888)
- 1896 – Additional Act modifying the International Convention for the Creation of an International Union for the Protection of Literary and Artistic Works, and Final Protocol, of 9 September 1886 (Paris, 4 May 1896)
- 1899 – International Convention for the Pacific Settlement of International Disputes [Hague I] (The Hague, 29 July 1899)
- 1899 – International Convention with respect to the Laws and Customs of War on Land [Hague II] (The Hague, 29 July 1899)
- 1899 – International Convention for Adapting to Maritime Warfare the Principles of the Geneva Convention of 22 August 1864 [Hague III] (The Hague, 29 July 1899)

== 1901–1922 multilateral treaties ==
Federation to after World War I

- 1902 – International Sanitary Convention [for preventing the introduction and spread of the Plague]
- 1903 – International Telegraphic Convention
- 1904 – Universal Postal Convention, Final Protocol and Detailed Regulations
- 1907 – Additional Act modifying the International Convention for the Protection of Industrial Property of 20 March 1883
- 1907 – ATS 1907 No 7 Declaration Prohibiting the Use of Expanding Bullets [dum-dums – Hague Declaration III]
- 1907 – Declaration Prohibiting the Use of Asphyxiating Gases [Hague Declaration II]
- 1907 – International Convention for the Amelioration of the Condition of the Wounded and Sick in Armies in the Field [Red Cross Convention]
- 1909 – International Sanitary Convention [on Cholera and the Plague]
- 1909 – International Declaration Prohibiting the Discharge of Projectiles and Explosives from Balloons [Hague XIV]
- 1909 – International Agreement respecting the Creation of an International Office of Public Health
- 1910 – Convention for the Creation of an International Institute of Agriculture
- 1910 – International Convention respecting the Limitation of the Employment of Force for the Recovery of Contract Debts [Hague II]
- 1910 – International Convention relative to the Opening of Hostilities [Hague III]
- 1910 – International Convention concerning the Laws and Customs of War on Land [Hague IV]
- 1910 – International Convention relative to the Status of Enemy Merchant Ships at the Outbreak of Hostilities [Hague VI]
- 1910 – International Convention relative to the Conversion of Merchant Ships into Warships [Hague VII]
- 1910 – International Convention relative to the Laying of Automatic Submarine Contact Mines [Hague VIII]
- 1910 – International Convention respecting Bombardments by Naval Forces in Time of War [Hague IX]
- 1910 – International Convention relative to Certain Restrictions on the Exercise of the Right of Capture in Maritime War [Hague XI]
- 1912 – International Convention for the Protection of Literary and Artistic Works
- 1912 – International Agreement for the Suppression of the Circulation of Obscene Publications
- 1913 – International Radiotelegraphic Convention, Final Protocol and Service Regulations
- 1913 – Convention respecting Measures for the Preservation and Protection of the Fur Seals in the North Pacific Ocean
- 1913 – International Radiotelegraph Convention, Final Protocol and Detailed Service Regulations
- 1914 – Additional Protocol to the International Convention for the Protection of Literary and Artistic Works of 13 November 1908, and Protocol of Signature
- 1915 – Convention respecting the Compilation of International Commercial Statistics, and Protocol
- 1915 – Protocol respecting the Putting into Force of the International Opium Convention of 23 January 1912
- 1919 – International Convention respecting the Prohibition of the Use of White (Yellow) Phosphorus in the Manufacture of Matches
- 1919 – Agreement between the Allied and Associated Powers with regard to the Contributions to the Cost of Liberation of the Territories of the Former Austro-Hungarian Monarchy
- 1919 – Agreement between the Allied and Associated Powers with regard to the Italian Reparation Payments
- 1919 – Declaration modifying [Articles 4 and 5 of] the Agreement between the Allied and Associated Powers with regard to the Contributions to the Cost of Liberation of the Territories of the Former Austro-Hungarian Monarchy
- 1919 – Declaration modifying [Article 4 of] the Agreement between the Allied and Associated Powers with regard to the Italian Reparation Payments of 10 September 1919
- 1920 – Treaty of Peace between the Allied and Associated Powers and Germany
- 1920 – Mandate for the Administration of the German Possessions in the Pacific Ocean situated South of the Equator other than German Samoa and Nauru
- 1920 – Treaty of Peace between the Allied and Associated Powers and Austria; Protocol, Declaration and Special Declaration
- 1920 – Treaty of Peace between the Allied and Associated Powers and Bulgaria, and Protocol
- 1920 – Treaty between the Principal Allied and Associated Powers and Czechoslovakia [Czechoslovak Minorities Treaty]
- 1920 – Treaty between the Principal Allied Powers and Denmark concerning Slesvig [Schleswig]
- 1920 – Agreement between Belgium, the British Empire, France and the United States of America, and Germany, with regard to the Military Occupation of the Territories of the Rhine
- 1920 – Treaty of Peace with Poland [Polish Minorities Treaty]
- 1920 – Treaty between the Principal Allied and Associated Powers and Roumania [Romanian Minorities Treaty]
- 1920 – Treaty between the Principal Allied and Associated Powers and the Serb-Croat-Slovene State [Yugoslav Minorities Treaty]
- 1920 – Agreement [between Australia, New Zealand and United Kingdom of Great Britain and Ireland] relating to Nauru
- 1920 – Convention revising the General Act of Berlin of 26 February 1885 and the General Act and Declaration of Brussels of 2 July 1890
- 1920 – Convention relating to the Liquor Traffic in Africa, and Protocol
- 1920 – Additional Protocol to the International Convention relative to Air Navigation of 13 October 1919
- 1920 – Treaty relating to the First International Opium Convention
- 1921 – Treaty between the Principal Allied and Associated Powers and Poland, Roumania, the Serb-Croat-Slovene State and the Czechoslovak State relative to Certain Frontiers of those States
- 1921 – Protocol of Signature of the Statute of the Permanent Court of International Justice
- 1921 – Protocol amending Paragraphs 12 and 19 of Annex II to Part VIII of the Treaty of Peace between the Allied and Associated Powers and Germany of 28 June 1919
- 1921 – Treaty of Peace between the Allied and Associated Powers and Hungary, Protocol and Declaration
- 1922 – International Convention relative to Air Navigation
- 1922 – Declaration on the Application of Article 5 of the International Convention relative to Air Navigation of 13 October 1919
- 1922 – Convention regarding the Organisation of the Campaign against Locusts
- 1922 – Declaration recognizing the Right to a Flag of States having no Sea Coast
- 1922 – International Convention for the Suppression of the Traffic in Women and Children

== 1923–1939 multilateral treaties ==
- 1923 – International Sanitary Convention
- 1923 – International Convention for the Creation at Paris of an International Institute of Refrigeration
- 1923 – Treaty between the British Empire, France, Japan and the United States of America relating to their Insular Possessions and Insular Dominions in the Pacific Ocean, and Declaration
- 1923 – Treaty Supplementary to the Treaty relating to Insular Possessions and Insular Dominions in the Pacific Ocean of 13 December 1921
- 1923 – Treaty between the British Empire, the United States of America, France, Italy and Japan, for the Limitation of Naval Armament
- 1923 – Protocol [between the British Empire, France and Italy, and Bulgaria] for Arrangements for Reparation Payments by Bulgaria
- 1923 – Agreement [between Australia, New Zealand and United Kingdom] regarding Nauru
- 1924 – Treaty between the Principal Allied and Associated Powers, and Greece, concerning the Protection of Minorities in Greece
- 1924 – Treaty between the Principal Allied and Associated Powers, and Greece, concerning Thrace
- 1924 – Protocol relating to the Treaty concluded at Sèvres between the Principal Allied Powers and Greece on the 10th August 1920, concerning the protection of Minorities in Greece, and to the Treaty concluded on the same day between the same powers relating to Thrace
- 1924 – Treaty of Peace [with Turkey]
- 1924 – Convention relating to the Regime of the Straits
- 1924 – Convention respecting the Thracian Frontiers
- 1924 – Convention respecting Conditions of Residence and Business and Jurisdiction (Turkey)
- 1924 – Declaration of Amnesty, and Protocol (Turkey)
- 1924 – Protocol relating to Certain Concessions granted in the Ottoman Empire, and Declaration by Turkey
- 1924 – Protocol relating to the Accession of Belgium and Portugal to Certain Provisions of Instruments signed at Lausanne, and Declarations by Belgium and Portugal
- 1924 – Protocol relating to the Karagatch Territory and the Islands of Imbros and Tenedos
- 1924 – Protocol relating to Signature by the Serb-Croat-Slovene State
- 1924 – Protocol of an Amendment to Article 6 [last paragraph] of the Covenant of the League of Nations of 28 June 1919
- 1924 – Protocol of an Amendment to Article 12 of the Covenant of the League of Nations of 28 June 1919
- 1924 – Protocol of an Amendment to Article 13 of the Covenant of the League of Nations of 28 June 1919
- 1924 – Protocol of an Amendment to Article 13 of the Covenant of the League of Nations of 28 June 1919
- 1924 – Protocol concerning the Settlement by means of a Lump Sum of the Cost of the Inter-Allied Occupation in Bulgaria
- 1924 – Agreement between the Allied Governments and the German Government concerning the Agreement between the Reparation Commission and the German Government of 9 August 1924
- 1924 – Agreement between the Allied Governments and the German Government to carry out the Experts' [Dawes] Plan of 9 April 1924
- 1924 – Inter-Allied Agreement to carry out the Experts' [Dawes] Plan of 9 April 1924
- 1924 – Protocol amending Paragraph 13 of Annex II to Part VIII of the Treaty of Peace between the Allied and Associated Powers and Germany of 28 June 1919
- 1924 – Agreement between the Governments represented on the Reparation Commission to modify Annex II [new paragraphs 2A and 16A, amended paragraph 17] to Part VIII of the Treaty of Peace between the Allied and Associated Powers and Germany of 28 June 1919
- 1925 – Universal Postal Convention, Final Protocol and Final Protocol rectifying Final Protocol; Detailed Regulations, and Final Protocol
- 1925 – Treaty concerning the Archipelago of Spitsbergen, and Protocol
- 1925 – ILO Convention (No. 9) for Establishing Facilities for Finding Employment for Seamen
- 1925 – Treaty relating to the Chinese Customs Tariff
- 1925 – Treaty relating to the Principles and Policies to be followed in Matters concerning China
- 1925 – International Convention relating to the Simplification of Customs Formalities, and Protocol of Signature
- 1925 – International Agreement for the Creation at Paris of an International Office for Dealing with Contagious Diseases of Animals, and Annex
- 1925 – International Convention for the Protection of Industrial Property, and Final Protocol
- 1926 – Protocol of an Amendment to Article 4 of the Covenant of the League of Nations of 28 June 1919
- 1926 – Protocol amending Article 5 of the International Convention relative to Air Navigation of 13 October 1919
- 1926 – Protocol amending Article 34 of the International Convention relative to Air Navigation of 13 October 1919
- 1926 – Convention on the International Régime of Maritime Ports, and Protocol of Signature
- 1927 – Protocol amending Article 10 of the Convention for the Creation of an International Institute of Agriculture of 7 June 1905
- 1927 – International Convention to Suppress the Slave Trade and Slavery
- 1927 – Treaty between the Principal Allied Powers and Roumania respecting Bessarabia
- 1928 – International Sanitary Convention, and Protocol of Signature
- 1928 – Agreement respecting Facilities to be Given to Merchant Seamen for the Treatment of Venereal Disease
- 1928 – International Convention relating to Dangerous Drugs, and Protocol, relating to the Second International Opium Convention
- 1929 – General Treaty for Renunciation of War as an Instrument of National Policy (Kellogg-Briand Pact)
- 1929 – International Radiotelegraph Convention; General Regulations; Additional Regulations
- 1930 – Protocol for the Prohibition of the Use in War of Asphyxiating, Poisonous or other Gases, and of Bacteriological Methods of Warfare
- 1930 – Universal Postal Convention, and Final Protocol; Detailed Regulations, and Final Protocol; Provisions regarding the Conveyance of Letter Mails by Air, and Final Protocol
- 1930 – Agreement regarding the Complete and Final Settlement of the Question of Reparations from Germany, and Annexes I-XII
- 1930 – Arrangement between the Creditor Powers of Germany concerning the Division of German Reparation Payments
- 1930 – Agreement regarding the Final Discharge of the Financial Obligations of Austria
- 1930 – International Agreement regarding the Financial Obligations of Czechoslovakia resulting from the Peace Treaties of 1919, etc.
- 1930 – International Treaty for the Limitation and Reduction of Naval Armament
- 1930 – Agreement in regard to the German Government International 51/2% Loan 1930
- 1930 – Convention for the Unification of Certain Rules of Law with respect to Collisions between Vessels
- 1930 – Convention for the Unification of Certain Rules of Law respecting Assistance and Salvage at Sea
- 1930 – Optional Clause of the Statute of the Permanent Court of International Justice of 16 December 1920
- 1931 – ILO Convention (No. 21) concerning the Simplification of the Inspection of Emigrants on Board Ship
- 1931 – Geneva Convention for the Amelioration of the Condition of the Wounded and Sick in Armies in the Field
- 1931 – Convention relative to the Treatment of Prisoners of War (Geneva, 27 July 1929)
- 1931 – Agreement regarding the Settlement of Bulgarian Reparations pursuant to the Peace Treaty of 27 November 1919
- 1931 – Agreements relating to the Obligations [of Hungary] resulting from the Treaty of Trianon of 4 June 1920; Letters and Declaration
- 1931 – British Commonwealth Merchant Shipping Agreement
- 1931 – Protocol concerning the Suspension of Payments by Germany
- 1931 – Protocol concerning the Suspension of Payments by Czechoslovakia
- 1932 – ILO Convention (No. 26) concerning the Creation of Minimum Wage-Fixing Machinery
- 1932 – International Convention relating to Economic Statistics, and Protocol
- 1932 – ILO Convention (No. 27) concerning the Marking of the Weight on Heavy Packages Transported by Vessels
- 1932 – International Agreement between the Creditor Powers respecting State Properties ceded by Austria, Hungary and Bulgaria, the Liberation Debts and the Distribution of Non-German Reparations
- 1932 – Protocol providing for the Suspension of Certain Payments by Bulgaria under the International Agreement of 20 January 1930
- 1932 – Protocol providing for the Suspension of Certain Payments by Hungary under the International Agreements of 28 April 1930
- 1932 – Supplementary Protocol to the Protocol concerning the Suspension of Payments by Germany of 11 August 1931
- 1932 – Supplementary Protocol to the Protocol concerning the Suspension of Payments by Czechoslovakia of 11 August 1931
- 1932 – Supplementary Protocol to the Protocol providing for the Suspension of Certain Payments by Bulgaria of 21 January 1932
- 1932 – Supplementary Protocol to the Protocol providing for the Suspension of Certain Payments by Hungary of 21 January 1932
- 1932 – Agreement concerning Non-German Reparations
- 1932 – Agreement regarding Transitional Measures concerning German Reparations
- 1933 – International Convention for the Protection of Industrial Property of 20 March 1883, revised at Brussels 14 December 1900, at Washington 2 June 1911, and at The Hague 6 November 1925
- 1933 – Protocol concerning Amendments to Articles 3, 5, 7, 15, 34, 37, 41, 42 and to the Final Clauses of the International Convention relative to Air Navigation of 13 October 1919
- 1933 – Protocol relating to Amendments to Articles 34 and 40 of the International Convention relative to Air Navigation of 13 October 1919
- 1933 – Final Act of the Conference of Wheat Exporting and Importing Countries
- 1933 – ILO Convention (No. 29) concerning Forced or Compulsory Labour
- 1934 – Protocol of an Amendment to Article 393 [ILO Constitution] of the Treaty of Peace with Germany, done at Versailles on 28 June 1919, and the Corresponding Articles of the other Treaties of Peace
- 1934 – Convention for Limiting the Manufacture and Regulating the Distribution of Narcotic Drugs, and Protocol of Signature
- 1934 – International Telecommunication Convention
- 1934 – Memorandum of Heads of Agreement concerning Silver
- 1934 – International Agreement relating to Statistics of Causes of Death, and Protocol of Signature (London, 19 June 1934)
- 1935 – ILO Convention (No. 7) fixing the Minimum Age for Admission of Children to Employment at Sea
- 1935 – ILO Convention (No. 8) concerning Unemployment Indemnity in case of Loss or Foundering of the Ship
- 1935 – ILO Convention (No. 15) fixing the Minimum Age for the Admission of Young Persons to Employment as Trimmers or Stokers
- 1935 – ILO Convention (No. 16) concerning the Compulsory Medical Examination of Children and Young Persons Employed at Sea
- 1935 – ILO Convention (No. 22) concerning Seamen's Articles of Agreement
- 1935 – International Convention for the Suppression of the Circulation of and Traffic in Obscene Publications
- 1935 – Berne Convention for the Protection of Literary and Artistic Works of 9 September 1886, as revised 13 November 1908 and 2 June 1928
- 1935 – Agreement between the Governments of the United Kingdom of Great Britain and Northern Ireland, Australia, Canada, India, New Zealand and South Africa, and the German and French Governments, regarding War Graves
- 1935 – International Sanitary Convention for Aerial Navigation
- 1935 – Universal Postal Convention, Final Protocol and Detailed Regulations; Provisions relating to the Conveyance of Letter Mails by Air, and Final Protocol
- 1935 – Agreement for Dispensing with Consular Visas on Bills of Health
- 1935 – Agreement for Dispensing with Bills of Health
- 1936 – International Convention for the Safety of Life at Sea
- 1936 – Protocol concerning the Revision of the Statute of the Permanent Court of International Justice of 16 December 1920
- 1936 – International Load Line Convention, and Final Protocol
- 1936 – International Convention for the Suppression of the Traffic in Women of Full Age
- 1936 – Convention regarding the Regime of the Straits, and Protocol (Montreux, 20 July 1936)
- 1936 – Procès-Verbal relating to the Rules of Submarine Warfare set forth in Part IV of the Treaty for the Limitation and Reduction of Naval Armament of 22 April 1930
- 1937 – Protocol relating to Military Obligations in Certain Cases of Double Nationality
- 1937 – Protocol relating to a Certain Case of Statelessness
- 1937 – Convention for Facilitating the International Circulation of Films of an Educational Character
- 1937 – Treaty for the Limitation of Naval Armament, Protocol of Signature, and Additional Protocol
- 1937 – International Agreement regarding the Regulation of Production and Marketing of Sugar, and Protocol
- 1938 – Convention on Certain Questions relating to the Conflict of Nationality Laws
- 1938 – Convention on the Stamp Laws in connection with Bills of Exchange and Promissory Notes, and Protocol
- 1938 – Convention on the Stamp Laws in connection with Cheques, and Protocol
- 1938 – Protocol regarding the Immunities of the Bank for International Settlements
- 1938 – International Convention concerning the Use of Broadcasting in the Cause of Peace
- 1938 – International Agreement modifying the Convention for the Creation of an International Institute of Refrigeration of 21 June 1920
- 1938 – Convention regarding the Abolition of the Capitulations in Egypt, Protocol and Declaration by the Royal Egyptian Government
- 1939 – Declaration regarding the Teaching of History (Revision of School Textbooks)
- 1939 – Convention amending the International Sanitary Convention of 21 June 1926
- 1939 – Additional Protocol to the Convention relating to the Salvage of Torpedoes of 12 June 1934
- 1939 – Declaration by the Government of Australia concerning the Optional Clause of the Statute of the Permanent Court of International Justice of 16 December 1920
- 1939 – Declaration by the Government of Australia concerning the General Act of Arbitration for the Pacific Settlement of International Disputes of 26 September 1928

== 1940–1949 multilateral treaties ==
- 1940 – ILO Convention (No. 63) concerning Statistics of Wages and Hours of Work in the Principal Mining and Manufacturing Industries, including Building and Construction, and in Agriculture
- 1940 – Intergovernmental Agreement for Tasman Sea Air Services
- 1940 – Protocol regarding Statistics of Causes of Death, revising the Annex to the International Agreement relating to Statistics of Death of 19 June 1934
- 1940 – Process-Verbal concerning the Application of Articles IV, V, VI, VII, IX, XII and XIII of the Convention for Facilitating the International Circulation of Films of an Educational Character of 11 October 1933
- 1940 – Exchange of Notes constituting an Agreement between His Majesty's Government in the Commonwealth of Australia and the Portuguese Government regarding the Establishment of an Air Service between Australia and Portuguese Timor
- 1940 – Denunciation by the Government of Australia of Declaration of Acceptance of 20 September 1929 of the Optional Clause of the Statute of the Permanent Court of International Justice of 16 December 1920
- 1942 – Declaration by United Nations; and Atlantic Charter of 14 August 1941
- 1942 – Memorandum of Agreement between the United States of America, Argentina, Australia, Canada and the United Kingdom of Great Britain and Northern Ireland relating to the Production and Marketing of Wheat, and Draft Convention
- 1942 – Protocol to enforce and to prolong the International Agreement regarding the Regulation of Production and Marketing of Sugar of 6 May 1937
- 1943 – Declaration by United Nations on Forced Dispossession of Property in Enemy-Controlled Territory
- 1943 – Agreement for United Nations Relief and Rehabilitation Administration [UNRRA]
- 1944 – Protocol extending the Agreement regarding the Regulation of the Production and Marketing of Sugar of 6 May 1937
- 1945 – Charter of the United Nations, as amended
- 1945 – Interim Arrangements concluded by the Governments represented at the United Nations Conference on International Organization [establishing the Preparatory Commission of the United Nations]
- 1945 – Agreement relating to Prisoners of War and Civilians Liberated by Forces operating under Soviet Command and Forces operating under British Command
- 1945 – Agreement by the Government of the United Kingdom of Great Britain and Northern Ireland, the Government of the United States of America, the Provisional Government of the French Republic and the Government of the Union of Soviet Socialist Republics for the Prosecution and Punishment of the Major War Criminals of the European Axis [including the Charter of the International Military Tribunal -"Nuremberg Tribunal"]
- 1945 – Protocol extending the Agreement regarding the Regulation of the Production and Marketing of Sugar of 6 May 1937
- 1945 – Convention modifying the International Sanitary Convention of 21 June 1926
- 1945 – Convention modifying the International Sanitary Convention for Aerial Navigation of 12 April 1933
- 1945 – Constitution of the Food and Agriculture Organization of the United Nations
- 1946 – Trusteeship Agreement for the Territory of New Guinea
- 1946 – Protocol extending the Agreement regarding the Regulation of the Production and Marketing of Sugar of 6 May 1937
- 1946 – Protocol to prolong the Convention of 15 December 1944 modifying the International Sanitary Convention of 21 June 1926
- 1946 – Protocol to prolong the Convention of 15 December 1944 modifying the International Sanitary Convention for Aerial Navigation of 12 April 1933
- 1946 – Agreement on Reparation from Germany, on the Establishment of an Inter-Allied Reparation Agency and on the Restitution of Monetary Gold
- 1946 – Agreement between the Government of the Commonwealth of Australia and the Government of the United States of America on Settlement for Lend-Lease, Reciprocal Aid, Surplus War Property, and Claims
- 1946 – Constitution of the United Nations Educational, Scientific and Cultural Organisation
- 1946 – International Agreement for the Regulation of Whaling
- 1946 – Protocol amending the International Agreement for the Regulation of Whaling of 8 June 1937
- 1946 – Agreement between the Governments [British Commonwealth and United States of America] represented at the Bermuda Telecommunications Conference
- 1946 – Exchange of Notes constituting an Agreement [between the Governments of Australia, Argentina, Canada, United Kingdom and United States of America] amending the Memorandum of Agreement relating to the Production and Marketing of Wheat of 22 April 1942
- 1946 – Instrument for the Amendment of the Constitution of the International Labour Organization of 28 June 1919
- 1947 – Agreement on Interim Measures to be taken in respect of Refugees and Displaced Persons
- 1947 – Agreement between the Government of Australia and the Preparatory Commission of the International Refugee Organization regarding the Migration to Australia of Refugees and Displaced Persons
- 1947 – Agreement between the Governments of Australia, New Zealand and the United Kingdom for the Formation of British Commonwealth Pacific Airlines Limited
- 1947 – Protocol extending the Agreement regarding the Regulation of the Production and Marketing of Sugar of 6 May 1937
- 1947 – Protocol concerning the Office International d'Hygiene Publique [International Office of Public Health]
- 1947 – Trusteeship Agreement for the Territory of Nauru
- 1947 – Protocol amending the International Agreement for the Regulation of Whaling of 8 June 1937 and the Protocol for the Regulation of Whaling of 24 June 1938
- 1947 – Agreement for the Establishment of a Provisional Maritime Consultative Council
- 1947 – Articles of Agreement of the International Monetary Fund
- 1947 – Articles of Agreement of the International Bank for Reconstruction and Development, as amended 25 August 1965 (Article III) and 30 June 1987 (Article VIII(a))
- 1947 – Protocol to amend the Convention for the Suppression of the Circulation of and Traffic in Obscene Publications of 12 September 1923
- 1947 – Protocol to amend the Convention for the Suppression of the Traffic in Women and Children of 30 September 1921, and the Convention for the Suppression of the Traffic in Women of Full Age of 11 October 1933
- 1947 – Protocol amending the Agreements, Conventions and Protocols on Narcotic Drugs of 23 January 1912, 11 February 1925, 19 February 1925, 13 July 1931, 27 November 1931 and 26 June 1936
- 1947 – International Convention modifying the Convention respecting the Creation of an International Office of Weights and Measures of 20 May 1875 [Metric Convention, and amendments]
- 1947 – Amendment to Article IV, paragraph 10, of the Constitution of the United Nations Educational, Scientific and Cultural Organization of 16 November 1945 (Mexico City, 1 December 1947)
- 1948 – Treaty of Peace with Bulgaria; Treaty of Peace with Finland; Treaty of Peace with Hungary; Treaty of Peace with Italy; Treaty of Peace with Roumania
- 1948 – Agreement between the Government of Australia and the United Nations International Children's Emergency Fund
- 1948 – Protocol for the Dissolution of the International Institute of Agriculture and the Transfer of its Functions and Assets to the Food and Agriculture Organization of the United Nations
- 1948 – Protocol for the Regulation of Whaling for the 1947–48 Season
- 1948 – Arrangement establishing the Interim Commission of the World Health Organization
- 1948 – Constitution of the World Health Organization
- 1948 – Instrument for the Amendment of the Constitution of the International Labour Organization of 28 June 1919, as amended
- 1948 – Agreement establishing the South Pacific Commission
- 1948 – Constitution of the International Refugee Organization
- 1948 – International Convention for the Regulation of Whaling [International Whaling Convention]
- 1948 – Agreement respecting certain SS Maréchal Joffre Claims
- 1948 – Protocol extending the Agreement regarding the Regulation of Production and Marketing of Sugar of 6 May 1937
- 1948 – Protocol amending the International Convention relating to Economic Statistics of 14 December 1928
- 1948 – General Agreement on Tariff and Trade [GATT]
- 1948 – Additional Protocol to the Agreement on Reparation from Germany, on the Establishment of an Allied Reparation Agency, and on the Restitution of Monetary Gold of 14 January 1946
- 1948 – Amendments to Article IV of the Constitution of the United Nations Educational, Scientific and Cultural Organization of 16 November 1945 (Beirut, 10 December 1948)
- 1949 – International Telecommunication Union, Final Protocol, and Additional Protocols I-X
- 1949 – Convention on the Privileges and Immunities of the United Nations
- 1949 – Agreement for the Establishment of the Indo-Pacific Fisheries Council
- 1949 – ILO Convention (No. 80) for the Partial Revision of Conventions adopted at the first Twenty-Eight Sessions of the General Conference of the International Labour Organization (Final Articles Revision Convention)
- 1949 – International Wheat Agreement
- 1949 – Universal Postal Convention and Final Protocol; Detailed Regulations; Provisions regarding Conveyance of Letter Mails by Air, and Final Protocol
- 1949 – Inter-Governmental Agreement between Australia, New Zealand and the United Kingdom of Great Britain and Northern Ireland for the Continued Operation and Development of Pacific Air Services by British Commonwealth Pacific Airlines Limited (Canberra, 27 October 1949)
- 1949 – Inter-Governmental Agreement between Australia, New Zealand and the United Kingdom of Great Britain and Northern Ireland for the Continued Operation of the Regular Services between Australia and New Zealand by Tasman Empire Airways Limited (Wellington, 15 September 1949)
- 1949 – Protocol for the prolongation of the Agreement regarding the Regulation of the Production and Marketing of Sugar of 6 May 1937
- 1949 – Protocol bringing under International Control Drugs outside the Scope of the Convention for Limiting the Manufacture and Regulating the Distribution of Narcotic Drugs of 13 July 1931, as amended
- 1949 – Protocol amending the International Agreement for the Suppression of the White Slave Traffic of 18 May 1904 and the International Convention for the Suppression of the White Slave Traffic of 4 May 1910
- 1949 – Protocol amending the Agreement for the Suppression of the Circulation of Obscene Publications of 4 May 1910
- 1949 – Agreement to revise the British Commonwealth-United States Telecommunications Agreement of 4 December 1945
- 1949 – Amendment to Article IV of the Constitution of the United Nations Educational, Scientific and Cultural Organization of 16 November 1945 (Paris, 5 October 1949)
- 1949 – Amendments to paragraphs 6, 7(a) and 10 of the Schedule to the International Convention for the Regulation of Whaling of 2 December 1946 (London, 7 June 1949)

== 1950–1959 multilateral treaties ==
- 1950 – Convention of the World Meteorological Organization, and Protocol concerning Spain
- 1950 – Agreement between the Governments of the United Kingdom, Australia, India, Pakistan and Ceylon on the one hand and the Government of Burma on the other hand respecting a Loan of [sterling]6,000,000 to be made by the Five Commonwealth Governments to the Government of Burma
- 1950 – Loan Agreement between the Commonwealth of Australia and the International Bank for Reconstruction and Development
- 1950 – ILO Convention (No. 88) concerning the Organisation of the Employment Service
- 1950 – Protocol amending the Convention concerning the Creation of an International Union for the Publication of Customs Tariffs, the Regulations for the Execution of the Convention instituting an International Bureau for the Publication of Customs Tariffs, and the Memorandum of Signature, of 5 July 1890
- 1950 – World Health Organization Regulations No. 1 regarding Nomenclature (including the Compilation and Publication of Statistics) with respect to Diseases and Causes of Death
- 1950 – Amendment to Article V, paragraph 3, of the Constitution of the United Nations Educational, Scientific and Cultural Organization of 16 November 1945 (Florence, 15 June 1950)
- 1950 – Amendment to paragraph 17 of the Schedule to the International Convention for the Regulation of Whaling of 2 December 1946 (London, 7 June 1949)
- 1951 – Convention on the Prevention and Punishment of the Crime of Genocide
- 1951 – Agreement between the Governments of the United Kingdom of Great Britain and Northern Ireland, Canada, Australia, New Zealand, the Union of South Africa, India and Pakistan and the Government of the Kingdom of the Netherlands relative to the Graves of Members of the Armed Forces of the British Commonwealth in Netherlands Territories
- 1951 – Agreement between the Governments of the United Kingdom of Great Britain and Northern Ireland, Australia, Canada, India, New Zealand, Pakistan and the Union of South Africa and the Government of Belgium respecting the War Cemeteries, Graves and Memorials of the British Commonwealth in Belgian Territory
- 1951 – Agreement extending the Territorial Scope of the South Pacific Commission
- 1951 – Agreement between the Governments of the United Kingdom of Great Britain and Northern Ireland, Canada, Australia, New Zealand, the Union of South Africa, India and Pakistan, and the Government of the French Republic regarding British Commonwealth War Graves in French Territory
- 1951 – Amendments to Articles II and IV of the Constitution of the United Nations Educational, Scientific and Cultural Organization of 16 November 1945 (Paris, 11 July 1951)
- 1951 – Amendments to the Schedule to the International Convention for the Regulation of Whaling of 2 December 1946 (Cape Town, 27 July 1951)
- 1952 – Treaty of Peace with Japan, and Protocol
- 1952 – Security Treaty between Australia, New Zealand and the United States of America [ANZUS]
- 1952 – International Plant Protection Convention
- 1952 – Agreement between the Government of the Commonwealth of Australia and the Food and Agriculture Organization of the United Nations for the Provision of Technical Assistance to the Governments of Tropical and Semi-Tropical Regions in the Form of a Eucalyptus Study Tour
- 1952 – International Plant Protection Convention
- 1952 – Agreement for the Settlement of Disputes arising under Article 15(a) of the Treaty of Peace with Japan of 8 September 1951
- 1952 – Loan Agreement between the Commonwealth of Australia and the International Bank for Reconstruction and Development
- 1952 – Supplementary Agreement to revise Article II of the British Commonwealth-United States of America Telecommunications Agreement of 12 August 1949
- 1952 – Exchange of Notes constituting an Agreement between the Government of Australia and the United Nations Technical Assistance Board regarding the Procurement and Delivery of Supplies by Australia to the Board
- 1952 – Protocol for the Prolongation of the Agreement regarding the Regulation of Production and Marketing of Sugar of 6 May 1937
- 1952 – Amendment to Article VI(2) of the Agreement for the Establishment of the Indo-Pacific Fisheries Council of 26 February 1948 (Quezon City, 7 November 1952)
- 1952 – Amendments to Articles IV, V and VI of the Constitution of the United Nations Educational, Scientific and Cultural Organization of 16 November 1945 (necessitated by the adoption of the system of biennial sessions of the General Conference) (Paris, 5 December 1952)
- 1952 – Amendments to paragraphs 6, 8(c) and 8(e) of the Schedule to the International Convention for the Regulation of Whaling of 2 December 1946 (London, 6 June 1952)
- 1953 – Protocol for the Termination of the Agreement for the Unification of Pharmacopoeial Formulas for Potent Drugs of 29 November 1906, as revised 20 August 1929
- 1953 – Constitution of the International Rice Commission, as amended May 1952
- 1953 – Agreement revising and renewing the International Wheat Agreement of 23 March 1949
- 1953 – Protocol between Australia, Canada, New Zealand, United Kingdom of Great Britain and Northern Ireland and United States of America, and Japan, on the Exercise of Criminal Jurisdiction over the United Nations Forces in Japan, and Agreed Official Minutes regarding Article concerning Criminal Jurisdiction
- 1953 – Protocol amending the convention to Suppress the Slave Trade and Slavery of 25 September 1926
- 1953 – International Sugar Agreement
- 1953 – Amendments to the Schedule to the International Convention for the Regulation of Whaling of 2 December 1946 (London, 26 June 1953)
- 1954 – Agreement between the Governments of the United Kingdom of Great Britain and Northern Ireland, Australia, Canada, India, New Zealand, Pakistan and the Union of South Africa and the Government of the Kingdom of Denmark regarding the War Graves and Memorials of the British Commonwealth in Danish Territory
- 1954 – Convention relating to the Status of Refugees
- 1954 – Instrument for the Amendment of the Constitution of the International Labour Organization
- 1954 – Declaration by Australia recognizing as Compulsory the Jurisdiction of the International Court of Justice
- 1954 – Agreement regarding the Status of the United Nations Forces in Japan, and Agreed Official Minutes
- 1954 – Loan Agreement between the Commonwealth of Australia and the International Bank for Reconstruction and Development
- 1954 – ILO Convention (No. 45) concerning the Employment of Women on Underground Work in Mines of all Kinds
- 1954 – Universal Postal Union: Universal Postal Convention, and Final Protocol; Detailed Regulations; Provisions regarding Air Mail Correspondence, and Final Protocol
- 1954 – Special Protocol relating to Article XXIV of the General Agreement on Tariffs and Trade [GATT] of 30 October 1947
- 1954 – Agreement on German External Debts
- 1954 – Agreement relating to the Frequency of Sessions of the South Pacific Commission
- 1954 – Constitution of the Intergovernmental Committee for European Migration
- 1954 – International Telecommunication Convention, Final Protocol, and Additional Protocols I-IV
- 1954 – Exchange of Notes constituting an Agreement between the Governments of Australia, New Zealand and the United Kingdom of Great Britain and Northern Ireland, and the Government of the Republic of Korea, for Settlement of Advances in Korean Currency made to the British Commonwealth Forces, Korea
- 1954 – Amendments to Article V of the Constitution of the United Nations Educational, Scientific and Cultural Organization of 16 November 1945 (concerning the composition of the executive board) (Montevideo, 22 November 1954)
- 1954 – Amendments to Article II (concerning withdrawal of Member States) and Articles V and VI (concerning reports by the Director-General on the activities of the Organization) of the Constitution of the United Nations Educational, Scientific and Cultural Organization of 16 November 1945 (Montevideo, 8 December 1954)
- 1954 – Amendments to the Schedule to the International Convention for the Regulation of Whaling of 2 December 1946 (Tokyo, 23 July 1954)
- 1955 – Convention on Road Traffic
- 1955 – Southeast Asia Collective Defense Treaty [SEATO], and Protocol
- 1955 – ILO Convention (No. 85) concerning Labour Inspectorates in Non-Metropolitan Territories
- 1955 – Agreement between the Governments of the United Kingdom of Great Britain and Northern Ireland, Canada, Australia, New Zealand, the Union of South Africa, India and Pakistan and the Government of Italy relative to the Graves in Italian Territory of Members of the Armed Forces of the British Commonwealth, Protocol of Signature, and Exchange of Notes
- 1955 – Agreement between the Governments of the United Kingdom of Great Britain and Northern Ireland, Canada, Australia, New Zealand, the Union of South Africa, India and Pakistan and the Egyptian Government regarding War Cemeteries, Graves and Memorials of the British Commonwealth in Egypt resulting from the War of 1939 [modifying the Agreement of 2 June 1937]
- 1955 – Loan Agreement between the Commonwealth of Australia and the International Bank for Reconstruction and Development
- 1955 – Agreement between the Governments of the United Kingdom of Great Britain and Northern Ireland, Canada, Australia, New Zealand, the Union of South Africa, India and Pakistan and the Government of Iraq regarding War Cemeteries Graves and Memorials of the British Commonwealth in Iraq resulting from the War of 1939–1945
- 1955 – Agreement between the Governments of the United Kingdom of Great Britain and Northern Ireland, Australia and India and the Government of Thailand regarding War Graves, and Exchange of Notes
- 1955 – Declaration on the Continued Application of Schedules to the General Agreement on Tariffs and Trade of 30 October 1947
- 1955 – Amendments to the Constitution of the International Rice Commission of 13 March 1948 (18 November 1955)
- 1955 – Amendments to Articles II of the Agreement for the Establishment of the Indo-Pacific Fisheries Council of 26 February 1948 (Tokyo, 14 October 1955)
- 1955 – Amendments to the Schedule to the International Convention for the Regulation of Whaling of 2 December 1946 (Moscow, 23 July 1955)
- 1956 – International Convention for the Unification of Certain Rules of Law relating to Bills of Lading [Hague Rules], and Protocol of Signature
- 1956 – Agreement concerning the International Institute of Refrigeration
- 1956 – International Convention to Facilitate the Importation of Commercial Samples and Advertising Material
- 1956 – Agreement between the United Kingdom of Great Britain and Northern Ireland, Canada, Australia, New Zealand, the Union of South Africa, India and Pakistan, and Japan, relative to the British Commonwealth War Cemetery in Japan
- 1956 – Plant Protection Agreement for the South East Asia and Pacific Region
- 1956 – Exchange of Notes constituting an Agreement terminating the Inter-Governmental Agreement for the Continued Operation of the Regular Services between Australia and New Zealand by Tasman Empire Airways Limited of 15 September 1949
- 1956 – Articles of Agreement of the International Finance Corporation
- 1956 – (First) International Tin Agreement
- 1956 – International Wheat Agreement, 1956
- 1956 – Sixth Protocol of Supplementary Concessions to the General Agreement on Tariffs and Trade of 30 October 1947
- 1956 – Amendments to Article V of the Constitution of the United Nations Educational, Scientific and Cultural Organization of 16 November 1945 (composition of the executive board) (New Delhi, 10 November 1956)
- 1956 – Amendments to the Schedule to the International Convention for the Regulation of Whaling of 2 December 1946 (London, 20 July 1956)
- 1957 – Interim Agreement on International Civil Aviation
- 1957 – Protocol amending the International Sugar Agreement of 1 October 1953
- 1957 – Agreement between the Government of Australia and the Food and Agriculture Organization of the United Nations for the Provision of Technical Assistance to the Government of Australia and other Countries and Territories of the Indo-Pacific Region in the Form of a Training Center in Fishery Cooperatives and Administration
- 1957 – Statute of the International Atomic Energy Agency [IAEA] (New York, 26 October 1956)
- 1957 – Agreement between the Government of the Commonwealth of Australia and the Government of the United States of America for Cooperation regarding Atomic Information for Mutual Defense Purposes
- 1957 – ILO Convention (No. 10) concerning the Age for Admission of Children to Employment in Agriculture, as modified 9 October 1946
- 1957 – ILO Convention (No. 11) concerning the Rights of Association and Combination of Agricultural Workers, as modified 9 October 1946
- 1957 – Procès-Verbal of Rectification concerning the Protocol amending Part I and Articles XXIX and XXX of the General Agreement on Tariffs and Trade of 10 March 1955, the Protocol amending the Preamble and Parts II and III of the General Agreement on Tariffs and Trade of 10 March 1955 and the Protocol of Organizational Amendments to the General Agreement on Tariffs and Trade of 10 March 1955
- 1957 – Protocol amending the Preamble and Parts II and III of the General Agreement on Tariffs and Trade of 30 October 1947
- 1957 – Commonwealth Telegraphs Agreement, and Protocol
- 1957 – Amendments to the Schedule to the International Convention for the Regulation of Whaling of 2 December 1946 (London, 28 June 1957)
- 1958 – Agreement between the Government of Australia and the Government of the United States of America to Facilitate Interchange of Patent Rights and Technical Information for Defence Purposes, and Exchange of Notes
- 1958 – Convention on the Intergovernmental Maritime Consultative Organization
- 1958 – European Convention on the International Classification of Patents for Invention
- 1958 – International Convention for the Protection of Industrial Property of 20 March 1883, as revised 14 December 1900, 2 June 1911, 6 November 1925 and 2 June 1934
- 1958 – Loan Agreement (Qantas Project) between the Commonwealth of Australia and the International Bank for Reconstruction and Development
- 1958 – Loan Agreement between the Commonwealth of Australia and the International Bank for Reconstruction and Development
- 1958 – Protocol amending Article 45 of the Convention on International Civil Aviation of 7 December 1944
- 1958 – Agreement between the United Kingdom of Great Britain and Northern Ireland, Canada, Australia, New Zealand, the Union of South Africa, India and Pakistan, the Federal Republic of Germany and the French Republic in regard to War Cemeteries, Graves and Memorials of the British Commonwealth
- 1958 – Agreement between the United Kingdom of Great Britain and Northern Ireland, Canada, Australia, New Zealand, the Union of South Africa, India and Pakistan and the Federal Republic of Germany regarding the War Graves, Cemeteries and Memorials of the British Commonwealth in the Territory of the Federal Republic of Germany, and Exchange of Notes
- 1958 – Geneva Conventions for the Amelioration of the Condition of the Wounded and Sick in Armed Forces in the Field
- 1958 – Amendment to Article IV of the International Tin Agreement of 1 March 1954
- 1958 – World Health Organization Additional Regulations amending the Regulations No. 1 regarding Nomenclature (including Compilation and Publication of Statistics) with respect to Diseases and Causes of Death of 24 July 1948, as amended
- 1958 – Amendments to Articles II, III and VI of the Agreement for the Establishment of the Indo-Pacific Fisheries Council of 26 February 1948 (Colombo, 17 December 1958)
- 1958 – Amendment to Article IV of the Constitution of the United Nations Educational, Scientific and Cultural Organization of 16 November 1945 (two-thirds majority) (Paris, 3 December 1958)
- 1958 – Amendments to the Schedule to the International Convention for the Regulation of Whaling of 2 December 1946 (The Hague, 27 June 1958)
- 1959 – International Sugar Agreement of 1958
- 1959 – Agreement on North Atlantic Ocean Stations
- 1959 – ILO Convention (No. 18) concerning Workmen's Compensation for Occupational Diseases
- 1959 – ILO Convention (No. 42) concerning Workmen's Compensation for Occupational Diseases (Revised)
- 1959 – ILO Convention (No. 19) concerning Equality of Treatment for National and Foreign Workers as regards Workmen's Compensation for Accidents
- 1959 – Protocol to the International Convention for the Regulation of Whaling of 2 December 1946
- 1959 – Convention establishing an International Organization of Legal Metrology
- 1959 – Utilities Claims Settlement Agreement between the United States of America (as Unified Command and on its Own Behalf and on Behalf of the States furnishing Military Forces or Field Hospitals to the Unified Command [including Australia]) and the Republic of Korea
- 1959 – International Wheat Agreement, 1959
- 1959 – Fourth Protocol of Rectifications and Modifications to the Annexes and to the Texts of the Schedules to the General Agreement on Tariffs and Trade of 30 October 1947
- 1959 – Amendments to Article 13 of the Convention of the World Meteorological Organization of 11 October 1947 (Geneva, 15 April 1959)
- 1959 – Amendments to Articles V, XVIII and XX of the Constitution of the Food and Agriculture Organization of the United Nations of 16 October 1945 (Rome, November 1959)
- 1959 – Amendments to the Schedule to the International Convention for the Regulation of Whaling of 2 December 1946 (London, 1 July 1959)

== 1960–1969 multilateral treaties ==
- 1960 – International Convention for the Safety of Life at Sea, 1948
- 1960 – ILO Convention (No. 12) concerning Workmen's Compensation in Agriculture
- 1960 – ILO Convention (No. 105) concerning the Abolition of Forced Labour
- 1960 – Articles of Agreement of the International Development Association
- 1960 – Agreement between the Governments of Cambodia, Laos, Thailand and Vietnam and the Government of Australia concerning Tax Exemption of Australian Contribution for the Development of the Water Resources of the Lower Mekong Basin
- 1960 – Declaration on Relations between Contracting Parties to the General Agreement on Tariffs and Trade of 30 October 1947 and the Government of the Polish People's Republic
- 1960 – Amendments to Articles 24 and 25 of the Constitution of the World Health Organization of 22 July 1946
- 1960 – Declaration on Relations between Contracting Parties to the General Agreement on Tariffs and Trade of 30 October 1947 and the Government of the Federal People's Republic of Yugoslavia
- 1960 – Declaration on Relations between Contracting Parties to the General Agreement on Tariffs and Trade of 30 October 1947 and the Government of the Federal People's Republic of Yugoslavia
- 1961 – Convention establishing a Customs Co-operation Council [CCC]
- 1961 – Indus Basin Development Fund Agreement, 1960
- 1961 – Convention on the Nationality of Married Women
- 1961 – Convention on the Taxation of Road Vehicles for Private Use in International Traffic, and Protocol of Signature
- 1961 – Agreement of Nice concerning the International Classification of Goods and Services to which Trade Marks are Applied
- 1961 – The Antarctic Treaty
- 1961 – State Treaty for the Re-Establishment of an Independent and Democratic Austria
- 1961 – Second International Tin Agreement
- 1961 – Constitution of the Eastern Regional Organization for Public Administration (EROPA), as amended 9 December 1960
- 1961 – Declaration on the Provisional Accession of Israel to the General Agreement on Tariffs and Trade of 30 October 1947
- 1961 – Amendment to [Article III of] the Articles of Agreement of the International Finance Corporation [IFC] of 25 May 1955 (1 September 1961)
- 1961 – Amendments to the Constitution of the International Rice Commission of 13 March 1948 (23 November 1961)
- 1961 – Amendments to the Agreement for the Establishment of the Indo-Pacific Fisheries Council of 26 February 1948 (23 November 1961)
- 1961 – Amendments to Articles III and V of the Constitution of the Food and Agriculture Organization of the United Nations of 16 October 1945 (Rome, 13 November 1961)
- 1961 – Amendments to the Schedule to the International Convention for the Regulation of Whaling of 2 December 1946 (London, 24 June 1960)
- 1962 – International Telecommunication Convention, Final Protocol and Additional Protocols I-IV
- 1962 – Protocol amending Article 50(a) of the Convention on International Civil Aviation of 7 December 1944
- 1962 – International Convention for the Prevention of Pollution of the Sea by Oil, 1954
- 1962 – International Wheat Agreement, 1962
- 1962 – Convention on the Privileges and Immunities of the Specialized Agencies
- 1962 – Protocol establishing a Preparatory Group with a View to the Creation of a European Organisation for the Development and Construction of Space Vehicle Launchers, and Supplementary Agreement
- 1962 – Short-Term Arrangements regarding International Trade in Cotton Textiles
- 1962 – Declaration on the Provisional Accession of Tunisia to the General Agreement on Tariffs and Trade of 30 October 1947
- 1962 – Declaration on the Provisional Accession of Argentina to the General Agreement on Tariffs and Trade of 30 October 1947
- 1962 – Loan Agreement (Snowy Mountains Project) between the Commonwealth of Australia and the International Bank for Reconstruction and Development
- 1962 – Amendment to Article V of the Constitution of the United Nations Educational, Scientific and Cultural Organization of 16 November 1945 (increase in the number of members of the executive board) (Paris, 15 November 1962)
- 1962 – Amendment to the Schedule to the International Convention for the Regulation of Whaling of 2 December 1946 (London, 6 July 1962)
- 1963 – Customs Convention concerning Facilities for the Importation of Goods for Display or Use at Exhibitions, Fairs, Meetings or Similar Events
- 1963 – Protocol for Limiting and Regulating the Cultivation of the Poppy Plant, the Production of, International and Wholesale Trade in, and Use of Opium
- 1963 – Convention on the Territorial Sea and the Contiguous Zone
- 1963 – Instrument for the Amendment of the Constitution of the International Labour Organization of 28 June 1919, as amended
- 1963 – Amendment to Article VI.A.3 of the Statute of the International Atomic Energy Agency of 26 October 1956
- 1963 – Protocol amending the International Convention for the Unification of Certain Rules relating to International Carriage by Air [Warsaw Convention] of 12 October 1929 (include full text of Warsaw Convention)
- 1963 – Commonwealth Telegraphs Agreement, 1963
- 1963 – ILO Convention (No. 116) concerning the Partial Revision of the Conventions adopted by the General Conference of the International Labour Organization at its First Thirty-Two Sessions for the purpose of Standardising the Provisions regarding the preparation of Reports by the Governing Body of the International Labour Office on the Working of Conventions [Final Articles Revision Convention]
- 1963 – Treaty banning Nuclear Weapon Tests in the Atmosphere, in Outer Space and Under Water
- 1963 – [First] International Coffee Agreement, 1962
- 1963 – [First] Procès-Verbal extending the Declaration on the Provisional Accession of Argentina to the General Agreement on Tariffs and Trade of 18 November 1960
- 1963 – Agreement between the Government of Australia and the United Nations relating to a Seminar on the Role of the Police in the Protection of Human Rights
- 1963 – Exchange of Notes constituting an Agreement between the Government of the United Kingdom of Great Britain and Northern Ireland [and on behalf of the Governments of Australia, Canada, India, New Zealand, Pakistan and South Africa] and the Government of the Italian Republic exempting from Italian Dues and Taxes, Fuels and Lubricants used by the Commonwealth War Graves Commission acting under the War Graves Agreement of 27 August 1953
- 1963 – Amendments to Article 13 of the Convention of the World Meteorological Organization of 11 October 1947 (Geneva, 11 April 1963)
- 1963 – Amendments to Articles VI and X of the Constitution of the Food and Agriculture Organization of the United Nations of 16 October 1945 (Rome, 3 December 1963)
- 1963 – Amendments to the Schedule to the International Convention for the Regulation of Whaling of 2 December 1946 (London, 5 July 1963)
- 1964 – Convention Supplementary to the International Convention for the Unification of Certain Rules relating to International Carriage by Air of 12 October 1929
- 1964 – Protocol for the Prolongation of the International Sugar Agreement of 1 December 1958
- 1964 – Convention for the Establishment of a European Organisation for the Development and Construction of Space Vehicle Launchers, Financial Protocol, and Protocol concerning Certain Responsibilities in connection with the Initial Programme
- 1964 – Agreement between the Governments of Australia, Canada, India, New Zealand, Pakistan and the United Kingdom of Great Britain and Northern Ireland, and the Government of the Republic of Indonesia, respecting the War Cemeteries, Graves and Memorials of the Commonwealth in Indonesian Territory
- 1964 – Interim Agreement between the Government of Australia, the Government of the United Kingdom of Great Britain and Northern Ireland and the European Organisation for the Development and Construction of Space Vehicle Launchers [ELDO] for the Conduct of the Phase I Firings of the Initial Programme of the Organisation
- 1964 – Indus Basin Development Fund (Supplemental) Agreement, 1964
- 1964 – Agreement establishing Interim Arrangements for a Global Commercial Communications Satellite System
- 1964 – Agreement between the Government of Australia and the United Nations Special Fund concerning Assistance from the Special Fund for a Project of Research on the Control of the Coconut Rhinoceros Beetle
- 1964 – Second Procès-Verbal extending the Declaration on the Provisional Accession of Tunisia to the General Agreement on Tariffs and Trade of 12 November 1959
- 1964 – Declaration on the Provisional Accession of the United Arab Republic to the General Agreement on Tariffs and Trade of 30 October 1947
- 1964 – Exchange of Notes constituting an Agreement between the Government of Australia [and on behalf of the Governments of New Zealand and the United Kingdom of Great Britain and Northern Ireland] and the Government of the United States of America relating to the Settlement for Logistical Support provided by the United States of America to Certain Armed Forces for United Nations Operations in Korea
- 1964 – Amendments to the Schedule to the International Convention for the Regulation of Whaling of 2 December 1946 (Sandefjord, 26 June 1964)
- 1965 – Agreement amending the Agreement establishing the South Pacific Commission of 6 February 1947
- 1965 – Protocol for the Extension of the International Wheat Agreement of 10 March 1962
- 1965 – Supplementary Agreement to the Interim Agreement between Australia, the United Kingdom of Great Britain and Northern Ireland and the European Organisation for the Development and Construction of Space Vehicle Launchers [ELDO] for the Conduct of the Phase I Firings of the Initial Programme of the Organisation of 6 May 1964
- 1965 – Agreement between Australia and the European Organisation for the Construction and Development of Space Vehicle Launchers [ELDO] governing the Conduct in Australia and Territories under the Authority of Australia of the Operations of the Organisation, and Two Exchanges of Notes
- 1965 – Agreement between the Government of the Commonwealth of Australia, the Government of New Zealand and the Government of the United Kingdom of Great Britain and Northern Ireland relating to the Territory of Nauru
- 1965 – Second Procès-Verbal extending the Declaration on the Provisional Accession of Argentina to the General Agreement on Tariffs and Trade of 18 November 1960
- 1965 – GATT: UAR extension – Second Procès-Verbal extending the Declaration on the Provisional Accession of Argentina to the General Agreement on Tariffs and Trade of 18 November 1960
- 1965 – Amendments to [Articles III and IV of] the Articles of Agreement of the International Finance Corporation [IFC] of 25 May 1955 (25 August 1965)
- 1965 – Amendments to Preamble and Article V of the Constitution of the Food and Agriculture Organization of the United Nations of 16 October 1945 (Rome, 1 December 1965)
- 1965 – Amendments to the Schedule to the International Convention for the Regulation of Whaling of 2 December 1946 (London, 2 July 1965)
- 1966 – Protocol for the Further Prolongation of the International Sugar Agreement of 1 December 1958
- 1966 – Exchanges of Notes constituting an Agreement between the Government of Australia and the United Nations concerning the Service with the United Nations Force in Cyprus [UNFICYP] of the National Contingent provided by Australia
- 1966 – Third International Tin Agreement
- 1966 – Agreement establishing the Asian Development Bank
- 1966 – Protocol for the Further Extension of the International Wheat Agreement of 10 March 1962
- 1966 – Universal Postal Union: Constitution, and Final Protocol; General Regulations, and Final Protocol; Convention, and Final Protocol; Detailed Regulations; Agreement concerning Postal Parcels, and Final Protocol; Detailed Regulations, and Final Protocol
- 1966 – Nam Ngum Development Fund Agreement, 1966
- 1966 – Agreement between the Government of the Commonwealth of Australia, the Government of the United States of America and the International Atomic Energy Agency for the Application of Safeguards
- 1966 – Protocol for the Further Prolongation of the International Sugar Agreement of 1 December 1958
- 1966 – Convention against Discrimination in Education
- 1966 – Supplementary Agreement on Arbitration to the Special Agreement of 20 August 1964 related to the Agreement establishing Interim Arrangements for a Global Commercial Communications Satellite System of 20 August 1964
- 1966 – Protocol amending the General Agreement on Tariffs and Trade of 30 October 1947 to Introduce a Part IV on Trade and Development
- 1966 – Amendments to the Schedule to the International Convention for the Regulation of Whaling of 2 December 1946 (London, 1 July 1966)
- 1967 – Convention concerning Customs Facilities for Touring, as amended 6 September 1966
- 1967 – Customs Convention on the Temporary Importation of Private Road Vehicles
- 1967 – Customs Convention on Containers, and Protocol of Signature
- 1967 – Customs Convention concerning Welfare Material for Seafarers
- 1967 – International Regulations for Preventing Collisions at Sea
- 1967 – International Telecommunication Convention; Final Protocol; Additional Protocols I-IV and Optional Additional Protocol
- 1967 – Agreement between the Government of Australia and the United Nations Development Programme concerning Assistance from the Special Fund Sector of the United Nations Development Programme for the Territory of Papua and the Trust Territory of New Guinea
- 1967 – Memorandum of Agreement on Basic Elements for the Negotiation of a World Grains Arrangement
- 1967 – Amendments to the International Convention for the Prevention of Pollution of the Sea by Oil of 12 May 1954
- 1967 – Protocol for the Further Extension of the International Wheat Agreement of 10 March 1962
- 1967 – Customs Convention on the A.T.A. Carnet for the Temporary Admission of Goods
- 1967 – Protocol extending the Long-Term Arrangement regarding International Trade in Cotton Textiles of 9 February 1962
- 1967 – Treaty on Principles Governing the Activities of States in the Exploration and Use of Outer Space, including the Moon and other Celestial Bodies
- 1967 – Agreement between the Governments of the United Kingdom of Great Britain and Northern Ireland, Canada, Australia, New Zealand, India and Pakistan, and the Imperial Ethiopian Government respecting the War Cemeteries, Graves and Memorials of the British Commonwealth in Ethiopian Territory
- 1967 – Protocol on Privileges and Immunities of the European Launcher Development Organisation, and Protocol of Signature
- 1967 – Agreement between the Government of Australia and the United Nations Children's Fund concerning Cooperation in relation to Projects to be carried out in the Territory of Papua and the Trust Territory of New Guinea
- 1967 – Single Convention on Narcotic Drugs, 1961
- 1967 – Third Procès-Verbal extending the Declaration on the Provisional Accession of Argentina to the General Agreement on Tariffs and Trade of 18 November 1960
- 1967 – Second Procès-Verbal extending the Declaration on the Provisional Accession of the United Arab Republic to the General Agreement on Tariffs and Trade of 13 November 1962
- 1967 – Second Procès-Verbal extending the Declaration on the Provisional Accession of the United Arab Republic to the General Agreement on Tariffs and Trade of 13 November 1962
- 1967 – Amendments to Articles 4(b) and 12(c) of the Convention of the World Meteorological Organization of 11 October 1947 (Geneva, 11 April 1967)
- 1967 – Amendments to Article V of the Constitution of the Food and Agriculture Organization of the United Nations of 16 October 1945 (Rome, November 1967)
- 1967 – Amendments to the Schedule to the International Convention for the Regulation of Whaling of 2 December 1946 (London, 30 June 1967)
- 1968 – Geneva (1967) Protocol to the General Agreement on Tariffs and Trade of 30 October 1947 [Kennedy Round]
- 1968 – World Health Organization Nomenclature Regulations (including the Compilation and Publication of Statistics) with respect to Diseases and Causes of Death, 1967
- 1968 – Vienna Convention on Diplomatic Relations
- 1968 – Optional Protocol to the Convention on Diplomatic Relations of 18 April 1961 concerning the Compulsory Settlement of Disputes
- 1968 – Customs Convention on the Temporary Importation of Professional Equipment
- 1968 – International Convention for the Safety of Life at Sea, 1960, and Regulations
- 1968 – Agreement between the Government of Australia and the Organizations participating in the Technical Assistance Sector of the United Nations Development Programme (United Nations; International Labour Organization; Food and Agriculture Organization; United Nations Educational, Scientific and Cultural Organization; International Civil Aviation Organization; World Health Organization; International Telecommunication Union; World Meteorological Organization; International Atomic Energy Agency; Universal Postal Union; Intergovernmental Maritime Consultative Organization; United Nations Industrial Development Organization) concerning Technical Assistance for the Territory of Papua and the Trust Territory of New Guinea
- 1968 – Amendments to Articles 23, 27 and 61 of the Charter of the United Nations of 26 June 1945
- 1968 – International Grains Arrangement 1967 comprising the Wheat Trade Convention and Food Aid Convention
- 1968 – Agreement between the Government of the Argentine Republic, the Government of the Commonwealth of Australia, the Government of Canada, the Government of the United Kingdom of Great Britain and Northern Ireland, and the Government of the United States of America relating to Cereals
- 1968 – Exchange of Notes constituting an Agreement between the Government of Australia and the Government of the United States of America to amend the Agreement relating to the Establishment of a United States Naval Communications Station in Australia of 9 May 1963
- 1968 – Agreement establishing a Cultural and Social Centre for the Asian and Pacific Region
- 1968 – Protocol required by Article 8(1)(e)(ii) of the Convention for the Establishment of a European Organisation for the Development and Construction of Space Vehicle Launchers [ELDO] of 29 March 1962 concerning the Use of Technical Information for Purposes not within the Field of Space Technology
- 1968 – International Coffee Agreement, 1968
- 1968 – International Convention on Load Lines, 1966
- 1968 – Agreement between the Governments of Australia, Canada, Federal Republic of Germany, India, Italy, Japan, the Netherlands, Pakistan, the Philippines, the United Kingdom of Great Britain and Northern Ireland and the Royal Government of Cambodia on Administrative Arrangements for the Prek Thnot (Cambodia) Power and Irrigation Development Project
- 1968 – Exchange of Notes constituting an Agreement between the Government of Australia and the Government of the United Kingdom of Great Britain and Northern Ireland on the Guarantee by the United Kingdom [on the value of sterling] and the Maintenance of the Minimum Sterling Proportion [of overseas reserves] by Australia [Sterling Area Agreement]
- 1968 – Amendments to the Convention establishing an International Organization of Legal Metrology of 12 October 1955
- 1968 – Fourth Procès-Verbal extending the Declaration on the Provisional Accession of Tunisia to the General Agreement on Tariffs and Trade of 12 November 1959
- 1968 – Third Procès-Verbal extending the Declaration on the Provisional Accession of the United Arab Republic to the General Agreement on Tariffs and Trade of 13 November 1962
- 1968 – Amendment to Article 28 of the Convention on the Intergovernmental Maritime Consultative Organization of 6 March 1948
- 1968 – Amendment to Article V of the Constitution of the United Nations Educational, Scientific and Cultural Organization of 16 November 1945 (Paris, 4 November 1968)
- 1968 – Amendments to the Schedule to the International Convention for the Regulation of Whaling of 2 December 1946 (Tokyo, 28 June 1968)
- 1969 – International Sugar Agreement, 1968
- 1969 – Protocol on the Authentic Trilingual Text of the Convention on International Civil Aviation of 7 December 1944
- 1969 – Basic Agreement between the Government of Australia and the World Health Organization for the Provision of Technical Advisory Assistance to the Territory of Papua and the Trust Territory of New Guinea, and Exchange of Letters
- 1969 – Agreement terminating the Commonwealth Telegraphs Agreements of 11 May 1948 and 25 July 1963
- 1969 – Commonwealth Telecommunications Organisation Financial Agreement
- 1969 – Universal Copyright Convention, and Protocols 1, 2 and 3
- 1969 – Asian-Oceanic Postal Convention, and Detailed Regulations
- 1969 – Berne Convention for the Protection of Literary and Artistic Works of 9 September 1886, as revised 13 November 1908, completed 20 March 1914, revised 2 June 1928 and revised 26 June 1948
- 1969 – Agreement establishing a Food and Fertiliser Technology Centre for the Asian and Pacific Region
- 1969 – Agreement between the Royal Hellenic Government of the one part and the Governments of Australia, Canada, India, New Zealand, Pakistan, South Africa and the United Kingdom of Great Britain and Northern Ireland of the other part concerning the Graves of Members of the Armed Forces of the Commonwealth in Greek Territory
- 1969 – Agreement between the Commonwealth of Australia and the European Organisation for the Development and Construction of Space Vehicle Launchers concerning the Use, Maintenance, Administration and Disposal of Facilities
- 1969 – Agreement on Fisheries between the Commonwealth of Australia and Japan
- 1969 – Customs Convention on the Temporary Importation of Scientific Equipment
- 1969 – Agreement between the Government of Australia and the Government of the United States of America relating to the Establishment of a Joint Defence Space Communications Station in Australia [Nurrungar SA]
- 1969 – European Convention on Customs Treatment of Pallets Used in International Transport
- 1969 – Amendment to Article I(a) of the Plant Protection Agreement for the South East Asia and Pacific Region of 27 February 1956
- 1969 – Fifth Procès-Verbal extending the Declaration on the Provisional Accession of Tunisia to the General Agreement on Tariffs and Trade of 12 November 1959
- 1969 – Fourth Procès-Verbal extending the Declaration on the Provisional Accession of the United Arab Republic to the General Agreement on Tariffs and Trade of 13 November 1962
- 1969 – Fourth Procès-Verbal extending the Declaration on the Provisional Accession of the United Arab Republic to the General Agreement on Tariffs and Trade of 13 November 1962
- 1969 – Protocol relating to Negotiations for the Establishment of New Schedule III – Brazil – to the General Agreement on Tariffs and Trade of 30 October 1947
- 1969 – Fifth Protocol of Rectifications and Modifications to the Texts of the Schedules to the General Agreement on Tariffs and Trade of 30 October 1947
- 1969 – Sixth Protocol of Rectifications and Modifications to the Texts of the Schedules to the General Agreement on Tariffs and Trade of 30 October 1947
- 1969 – Seventh Protocol of Rectifications and Modifications to the Texts of the Schedules to the General Agreement on Tariffs and Trade of 30 October 1947
- 1969 – Eighth Protocol of Rectifications and Modifications to the Texts of the Schedules to the General Agreement on Tariffs and Trade of 30 October 1947
- 1969 – Ninth Protocol of Rectifications and Modifications to the Texts of the Schedules to the General Agreement on Tariffs and Trade of 30 October 1947
- 1969 – Amendment to Article XXII of the Constitution of the Food and Agriculture Organization of the United Nations of 16 October 1945 (Rome, 24 November 1969)
- 1969 – Amendments to the Schedule to the International Convention for the Regulation of Whaling of 2 December 1946 (London, 27 June 1969)

== 1970–1974 multilateral treaties ==
- 1970 – Agreement between the Government of the Commonwealth of Australia and the European Space Research Organisation for the Provision and Operation of Trials Facilities at Woomera for Launching of a Skylark Rocket in January/February 1970
- 1970 – Exchange of Notes constituting an Agreement between the Government of Australia and the Government of the United States of America concerning Space Vehicle Tracking and Communications Facilities
- 1970 – Arrangement concerning certain Dairy Products
- 1970 – ILO Convention (No. 99) concerning Minimum Wage Fixing Machinery in Agriculture
- 1970 – Agreement establishing an Economic Cooperation Centre for the Asian and Pacific Region
- 1970 – Agreement between the Government of the Commonwealth of Australia and the European Space Research Organisation for the Provision and Operation of Trials Facilities at Woomera for Launching Skylark Rockets
- 1970 – Protocol extending the Long-Term Arrangement regarding International Trade in Cotton Textiles of 9 February 1962
- 1970 – ILO Convention (No. 122) concerning Employment Policy
- 1970 – Convention on the International Hydrographic Organization
- 1970 – Sixth Procès-Verbal extending the Declaration on the Provisional Accession of Tunisia to the General Agreement on Tariffs and Trade of 12 November 1959
- 1970 – Fifth Procès-Verbal extending the Declaration on the Provisional Accession of the United Arab Republic to the General Agreement on Tariffs and Trade of 13 November 1962
- 1970 – Revised Text of Annex II to the Agreement on North Atlantic Ocean Stations of 25 February 1954 (5 June 1968)
- 1970 – Amendments to the Schedule to the International Convention for the Regulation of Whaling of 2 December 1946 (London, 26 June 1970)
- 1971 – Agreement between the Government of the Commonwealth of Australia and the Government of the United Kingdom of Great Britain and Northern Ireland to provide for the Establishment and Operation of a Large Optical Telescope
- 1971 – Fourth International Tin Agreement
- 1971 – International Wheat Agreement, 1971
- 1971 – Protocol to amend the Agreement on North Atlantic Ocean Stations of 25 February 1954
- 1971 – Convention on the Organisation for Economic Co-operation and Development [OECD], and Supplementary Protocols 1 and 2
- 1971 – Customs Convention on the Temporary Importation of Pedagogic Material
- 1971 – Agreement establishing a Registry of Scientific and Technical Services for the Asian and Pacific Region
- 1971 – Asian-Oceanic Postal Convention, Final Protocol and Detailed Regulations
- 1971 – Cultural Agreement between the Government of the Commonwealth of Australia and the Government of the Republic of India
- 1971 – ILO Convention (No. 47) concerning the Reduction of Hours of Work to Forty a Week
- 1971 – Five Power Defence Arrangements
- 1971 – Agreement between the Government of the Commonwealth of Australia and the Government of the Republic of South Africa concerning an International Observer Scheme for Land-Based Whaling Stations
- 1971 – Amendments to Articles V and VII of the Constitution of the Food and Agriculture Organization of the United Nations of 16 October 1945 (Rome, 19 November 1971)
- 1972 – Convention on Transit Trade of Land-locked States
- 1972 – ILO Convention (No. 112) concerning the Minimum Age for Admission to Employment as Fishermen
- 1972 – Paris Convention for the Protection of Industrial Property of 20 March 1883
- 1972 – Berne Convention for the Protection of Literary and Artistic Works of 9 September 1886, completed at Paris on 4 May 1896, revised at Berlin on 13 November 1908, completed at Berne on 20 March 1914, revised at Rome on 2 June 1928, revised at Brussels on 26 June 1948, and revised at Stockholm on 14 July 1967
- 1972 – Nice Agreement concerning the International Classification of Goods and Services for the Purposes of the Registration of Marks of 15 June 1957, as revised at Stockholm on 14 July 1967
- 1972 – Convention establishing the World Intellectual Property Organization [WIPO]
- 1972 – Convention for the Suppression of Unlawful Seizure of Aircraft [Hijacking Convention]
- 1972 – Exchange of Notes constituting an Agreement between the Government of Australia and the Government of the United Kingdom of Great Britain and Northern Ireland concerning the Establishment of a Station to Monitor Compliance with the Partial Test Ban Treaty [of 5 August 1963]
- 1972 – ILO Convention (No. 123) concerning the Minimum Age for Admission to Employment Underground in Mines
- 1972 – Amendment to Article V of the Constitution of the United Nations Educational, Scientific and Cultural Organization of 16 November 1945 (Paris, 24 October 1972)
- 1972 – Amendments to Articles IV and VIII of the Constitution of the United Nations Educational, Scientific and Cultural Organization of 16 November 1945 (Paris, 30 October 1972)
- 1972 – Amendments to the Schedule to the International Convention for the Regulation of Whaling of 2 December 1946 (London, 30 June 1972)
- 1973 – Protocol relating to an Amendment to Article 50(a) of the Convention on International Civil Aviation of 7 December 1944
- 1973 – Treaty on the Non-Proliferation of Nuclear Weapons
- 1973 – Treaty on the Prohibition of the Emplacement of Nuclear Weapons and other Weapons of Mass Destruction on the Sea-Bed and the Ocean Floor and in the Subsoil Thereof
- 1973 – Agreement relating to the International Telecommunications Satellite Organization (”Intelsat")
- 1973 – Vienna Convention on Consular Relations
- 1973 – Statute of the International Institute for the Unification of Private Law (UNIDROIT), as amended (Rome, 15 March 1940)
- 1973 – Agreement terminating the Commonwealth Telecommunications Organisation Financial Agreement of 27 January 1969
- 1973 – Agreement establishing the South Pacific Bureau for Economic Co-operation
- 1973 – Protocol relating to Milk Fat
- 1973 – Agreement relating to Refugee Seamen
- 1973 – Convention on Nomenclature for the Classification of Goods in Customs Tariffs, as amended 16 June 1960
- 1973 – ILO Convention (No. 2) concerning Unemployment
- 1973 – Protocol to amend the Agreement on North Atlantic Ocean Stations of 25 February 1954, as amended 13 May 1970
- 1973 – Convention for the Suppression of Unlawful Acts against the Safety of Civil Aviation
- 1973 – International Coffee Agreement of 18 March 1968 as extended
- 1973 – Statute of The Hague Conference on Private International Law
- 1973 – Amendment to Article 61 of the Charter of the United Nations of 26 June 1945
- 1973 – Agreement between the Government of the Commonwealth of Australia and the Government of the Republic of Indonesia establishing Certain Seabed Boundaries
- 1973 – Agreement between the Government of the Commonwealth of Australia and the Government of the Republic of Indonesia establishing Certain Seabed Boundaries in the Area of the Timor and Arafura Seas, supplementary to the Agreement of 18 May 1971
- 1973 – Agreement concerning the Voluntary Contributions to be Given for the Execution of the Project to Preserve Borobudur
- 1973 – Amendments to Article VI of the Statute of the International Atomic Energy Agency of 26 October 1956
- 1973 – Protocol relating to the Status of Refugees
- 1973 – International Cocoa Agreement, 1972
- 1973 – Protocol to Amend the Convention Signed at Paris on the 22nd of November 1928 Relating to International Exhibitions
- 1973 – International Sugar Agreement, 1973
- 1973 – Amendment to Article V of the Constitution of the Food and Agriculture Organization of the United Nations of 16 October 1945 (Rome, 16 November 1973)
- 1973 – Amendments to the Schedule to the International Convention for the Regulation of Whaling of 2 December 1946 (London, 29 June 1973)
- 1974 – Vienna Convention on the Law of Treaties
- 1974 – ILO Convention (No. 87) concerning Freedom of Association and Protection of the Right to Organise
- 1974 – ILO Convention (No. 98) concerning the Application of the Principles of the Right to Organise and to Bargain Collectively
- 1974 – Convention for the Protection of Producers of Phonograms against Unauthorised Duplication of their Phonograms
- 1974 – Arrangement regarding International Trade in Textiles
- 1974 – Protocols for the Extension of the Wheat Trade Convention and Food Aid Convention constituting the International Wheat Agreement of 20 February 1971
- 1974 – ILO Convention (No. 111) concerning Discrimination in respect of Employment and Occupation
- 1974 – ILO Convention (No. 131) concerning Minimum Wage Fixing, with Special Reference to Developing Countries
- 1974 – ILO Convention (No. 83) concerning the Application of International Labour Standards to Non-Metropolitan Territories
- 1974 – ILO Convention (No. 86) concerning the Maximum Length of Contracts of Employment of Indigenous Workers
- 1974 – Agreement between Australia and the International Atomic Energy Agency for the Application of Safeguards in connection with the Treaty on the Non-Proliferation of Nuclear Weapons of 1 July 1968
- 1974 – Protocol suspending Safeguards applied in Australia under the Agreement between the International Atomic Energy Agency, the Government of Australia and the Government of the United States of America for the Application of Safeguards pursuant to the Treaty on the Non-Proliferation of Nuclear Weapons of 1 July 1968
- 1974 – Convention relating to the Status of Stateless Persons
- 1974 – Second Nam Ngum Development Fund Agreement, 1974
- 1974 – Protocol instituting a Conciliation and Good Offices Commission for the Settlement of Disputes arising between Parties to the Convention against Discrimination in Education of 15 December 1960
- 1974 – Protocol for the Accession of Hungary to the General Agreement on Tariffs and Trade of 30 October 1947
- 1974 – Declaration on the Provisional Accession of the Philippines to the General Agreement on Tariffs and Trade of 30 October 1947
- 1974 – Agreement concerning the Continuing Relationship between Australia and the European Organisation for the Development and Construction of Space Vehicle Launchers
- 1974 – Protocol relating to an Amendment to Article 56 of the Convention on International Civil Aviation of 7 December 1944
- 1974 – Instrument for the Amendment of the Constitution of the International Labour Organization of 28 June 1919, as amended
- 1974 – Guarantee Agreement (Second Power Project) between Australia and the International Bank for Reconstruction and Development relating to a Loan from the Bank to the Government of Papua New Guinea
- 1974 – Amendments to the Schedule to the International Convention for the Regulation of Whaling of 2 December 1946 (London, 28 June 1974)

== See also ==
- List of Australian treaties
