= APFC =

APFC may refer to:

- Active/automatic power factor correction/control (panel), used to control the power factor of electrical loads
- Alaska Permanent Fund Corporation
- Albert Park Football Club, a present-day amateur Australian rules football club
- Albert Park Football Club (VFA), a former Australian rules football club from the 1860s and 1870s
- Annfield Plain F.C.
- Assistant provident fund commissioner in Employees' Provident Fund Organisation of India
- National Football League, professional American football league, originally named the APFC

== See also ==
- Asia-Pacific Fishery Commission (APFIC)
