= Navalpakkam Parthasarthy =

20th century Indian geneticist

- Born: 8 April 1900; India
- Died: 4 January 1993 (aged 92)
- Awards: Padma Shri; Rural Development Agency, South Korea Gold Medal

Navalpakkam Parthasarthy (1900–1993) was an Indian geneticist, executive secretary of International Rice Commission and Rice Advisor to the governments of Liberia and Thailand. The Government of India honoured him in 1958, with the award of Padma Shri, the fourth highest Indian civilian award for his services to the nation.

== Biography ==
Navalpakkam Parthasarathy was born on 8 April 1900. He graduated (BA) from Madras University and continued studies to specialize in Agriculture to secure the degree of BSc from the same university. His career started in 1923 as a rice breeding assistant at the Paddy Breeding Station in Coimbatore and later, worked at other stations in Aduthurai and Pattambi. He moved to London in 1936 to secure his doctoral degree (PhD) from the University of London and returned to India in 1938 to resume his work.

He worked in various capacities with the state and central governments in India as the Geneticist and Second Cane Breeding Officer, Sugarcane Breeding Institute, Coimbatore, a research station of the Indian Institute of Sugarcane Research (1940–47), as the Geneticist and Division Head of the Indian Agricultural Research Institute (IARI), New Delhi (1947–52) and as the Director of the Central Rice Research Institute, Cuttack (1952–58) from where he retired from government service. In 1958, he worked for Food and Agriculture Organization (FAO) as a Rice Expert based in Indonesia for a year and moved to International Rice Research Institute as the Rice Improvement Specialist for the Far East (1959–68). He also served as a board member of the IRRI (1966–69). Subsequently, he was appointed as the Executive Secretary of the International Rice Commission and also worked as the Rice Adviser to the Government of Liberia and the Government of Thailand.

== Legacy, awards and recognitions ==
Parthasarathy was known to have engaged in extensive research in the fields of cytology and genetics of sugar cane and rice and was credited with induction of mutations in X-radiation for the first time. The team led by him were successful in isolating haploids and Polyploids in rice and their studies were reported to have obtained twin plants with different chromosome numbers. At Central Rice Research Institute, he was instrumental in establishing interdisciplinary research programs and conducted two rice breeding courses at the institute with assistance from Food and Agriculture Organization. He attended many seminars and conferences to deliver key note addresses and published many articles.

He was an elected fellow of the Indian National Science Academy (INSA) and the Tamil Nadu Academy of Sciences and served as a member of INSA council during 1978–79 He also served as the president of Indian Society of Genetics and Plant Breeding for two terms (1952 and 1970), the agricultural section of the Indian Science Congress (1953) and the Madras Science Foundation. A recipient of the Gold Medal from the Rural Development Agency under the Ministry of Agriculture, Food and Rural Affairs, South Korea, Parthasarathy was awarded the fourth highest Indian civilian honour of Padma Shri by the Government of India in 1958.

Parthasarathy died, aged 93, on 4 January 1993.

== See also ==
- International Rice Commission
- Food and Agriculture Organization
