= Viktor Brodyanskiy =

Russian chemist (1919–2009)

Viktor Mikhailovich Brodyanskiy
- Born: Viktor Mikhailovich Brodyanskiy; Виктор Михайлович Бродянский; 16 March 1919; Rostov-on-Don, Don Republic
- Died: 21 March 2009 (aged 90); Moscow, Russia
- Occupation: chemist

Viktor Mikhailovich Brodyanskiy (Russian: Виктор Михайлович Бродянский; 16 March 1919, Rostov-on-Don — 21 March 2009, Moscow) was a Russian chemist and a specialist in the field of thermodynamics and cryogenic technology. Professor, Doctor of Technical Sciences. Honoured Worker of Science of the Russian Federation.

== Biography ==
In July 1941, as a fourth-year student at the Moscow Institute of Chemical Engineering, he volunteered to serve in Red Army. He fought in tank forces and in motorized infantry — in Smolensk region, near Moscow, in Belarus; was twice wounded.

In October 1945 he continued his studies at Moscow Institute of Chemical Engineering, wrote his thesis under the guidance of Petr Kapitsa. Having graduated from the Institute with a degree in mechanical engineer, he worked at the All-Union Research Institute of Oxygen Engineering in 1949—1952, where he developed technological schemes for air separation plants. In 1952—1957 he was the head of the Gas Department of the 1st Moscow autogenic plant.

From 1957 to 2001 he taught at Moscow Power Engineering Institute at the Department of Industrial Heat and Power Plants, then — at the Department of Cryogenic Engineering.

In 1954 he defended his candidate, in 1968 — doctoral dissertation. Professor (1970). Member of the International Institute of Refrigeration.

Brodyanskiy was the author of more than 200 scientific works, including 15 monographs and manuals, some of which have been translated into German, French, Chinese and Korean.
