= Sithiporn Kridakara =

Thai agricultural leader (1883–1971)

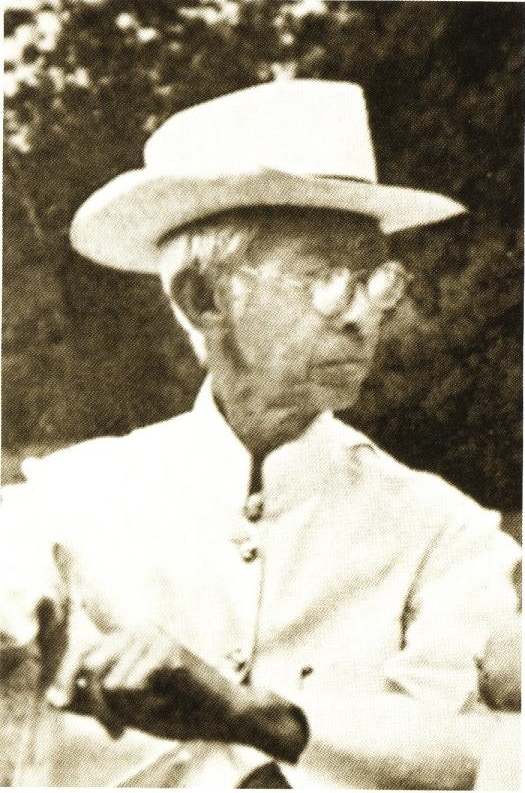
- Born: 11 April 1883; Bangkok, Siam
- Died: 22 June 1971 (aged 88); Bangkok, Thailand
- Spouse: Thip Kridakorn na Ayudhya; Sriphromma Kridakorn na Ayudhya
- Issue: Amnuyporn Kridakorn; Pensri Kridakorn; Anuporn Kridakorn
Names
- His Serene Highness Prince (Mom Chao); Sithiporn Kridakara: 11 April 1883 – 22 June 1971
- House: Kritakara family (Chakri Dynasty)
- Father: Krida Bhinihan, the Prince Naretraworit
- Mother: Suphab Kridakorn
- Occupation: Public servant, agriculturist
- Education: Harrow and the City and Guild's Technical College (now part of University of London

Prince Sithiporn Kridakara (Thai: หม่อมเจ้าสิทธิพร กฤดากร; April 11, 1883 – June 22, 1971) is known as Thailand's Farmer Prince who was awarded the 1967 Ramon Magsaysay Award for Public service for his efforts in the development of Thai agriculture. While serving as chairman of the International Rice Commission, he was instrumental for the establishment of the International Rice Research Institute in Los Baños, Laguna in the Philippines.

== Personal life ==
Sithiporn was born on April 11, 1883, and studied in England for most of his early years. At 18, while studying mechanical engineering at City and Guild's Technical College, he was summoned back to his home country to help manage the family's lime-burning business.

At 21, he married a woman who soon died but not without bearing a son. His second wife was Mom Sriphromma, daughter of the last hereditary chief of Nan. Despite his royal blood as fourth son of His Royal Highness Krida Bhinihan, the Prince Naretraworit, grandson of King Mongkut, and nephew of King Chulalongkorn, he developed a profound interest in agriculture. This interest came about due to his wife's fragile health which required the fresh air and open spaces of the countryside.

== Career and legacy ==
Sithiporn successfully propagated the Nicholson Yellow Dent variety of corn which he encouraged other farmers to plant for animal feed. Starting 1950 when rice was not favorable to land conditions, corn was planted instead. By the 1980s, corn became one of Thailand's major exports. He was also instrumental in the establishment of an egg producers' association which made Thailand an exporter of eggs.

When the United Nations Food and Agriculture Organization (FAO) established the International Rice Commission in 1949, Sithiporn was elected as chairman. His suggestion for a research center for rice production during one of the meetings with the Rockefeller Foundation resulted in the establishment of the International Rice Research Institute in Los Baños, Laguna in the Philippines.

== Honors and awards ==
- Ramon Magsaysay Award, 1967 for Public Service
- Honorary Doctorate in Agriculture, Kasetsart University
- Honorary member of the Siam Society
- 1983 Birth Centenary Thai postage stamp
- First Prize for rice at the 1933 World Seed and Grain Exhibition in Regina, Canada
