= Common Market Organization for Sugar =

The Common Market Organization for Sugar regulates the sugar market in the European Union. For a long time, it was also known as the EU sugar quota system, after its most notable aspect. The sugar production quotas were in place from 1968 to 2017. Before ending the system the quota system, a thorough restructuring of the sugar production sector took place between 2006 and 2010. What now remains of the Common Market Organization is a much looser regulation.

== Legal base ==
The Treaty of Rome established the European Economic Community on 1 January 1958. It set common goals for the signatories and created: institutions, a common market, a customs union, and joint policies.

One of the joint policies that the Treaty of Rome created was the Common Agricultural Policy (CAP). The CAP was meant to allow the intended extension of the internal market to agricultural products. In summary, the goals of the CAP were: increasing agricultural productivity; ensuring a fair rural standard of living; stabilizing markets; ensuring availability of products; and ensuring reasonable prices. This could be done by encouraging agricultural production with remunerative and stable prices for farmers.

In order to attain the objectives of the Common Agricultural Policy (CAP), common market organisations (CMO's) were created. One of the up to 21 CMO's that existed up to 2007, was the CMO for sugar, which introduced the EU sugar quota system. In 2007 the separate CMO's would become a single CMO.

== Creating an internal market for sugar (1968) ==
=== Huge differences in productivity ===
An internal market for sugar requires an internal market price for sugar beet, raw sugar and refined sugar (a.k.a. white sugar). However, in 1958, the sugar markets of the member states were very regulated and protected. There were very big differences in productivity of farmers and sugar producers. In some member states, the production of refined sugar was so inefficient that in 1968, their factories produced at a price triple the world market price.

=== Intervention price, quotas, import regulation and export subsidies ===
The essential features of the sugar quota system were: intervention prices, quotas, tariffs and export subsidies.

Most of the system was paid for by the European consumers. These paid a substantially above market price for sugar. As most sugar was used by industry, the total price paid for the system was far less notable than the increased price that the consumer paid for a package of white sugar.

=== Intervention price ===
The intervention price was a main instrument of market regulation by the European Community. It simply meant that as soon as a market price fell below a certain threshold, intervention agencies bought surplus commodities.

The support prices were (high) guaranteed minimum prices for sugar beet, raw sugar and white sugar. (The raw cane sugar that the EEC imported to support certain countries was also bought at an above market prices).

In order to meet the goals of the CAP, the interventions prices for sugar were so high that even the least efficient producers could make an income.

From 2001 to June 2006, the support prices were as follows:

- For white sugar EUR 631.90 per tonne
- For raw sugar EUR 523.70 per tonne
- For A quotum sugar beet EUR 46.72 per tonne (minus 2% levy)
- For B quotum sugar beet EUR 28.84 per tonne (minus 39% levy)

The actual wholesale prices were usually well above the intervention prices, which were in turn were normally well above world market prices. Intervention prices in Finland, Ireland, Portugal, the UK, Spain, Greece and Italy were somewhat higher.

=== The quotas ===
Quotas were necessary because the regulation as a whole led to internal market prices way above the world market price. Without some limit on production, the most efficient producers would use their profits to increase production. Several quotas were to prevent the intervention price from leading to overproduction.

The quotas were determined based on the desired sugar production of each of the European Community member states, which was close to their beet sugar consumption. Each member state then allocated its national quota to sugar beet factories on its territory. These factories then converted their share in delivery rights for growers.

These quotas were divided into A and B quotas. The A quota was intended to equal domestic consumption. The smaller B quota was a safety margin to guarantee that enough would be produced for domestic consumption. Excess A and B sugar was exported with subsidies, which were paid for by a levy on B sugar.

Sugar produced within the A and B quotum got a guaranteed support price, i.e. a minimum price whatever the actual world market price for sugar was. The support price for the A quotum was significantly above the world market price. Sugar produced above the quotas, known as 'C-sugar' or 'out-of-quota' sugar, had to be exported outside of the community, sold for non-food uses, or be stored and counted against next year's quotum. The C-sugar did not get an export subsidy.

=== Import regulation ===
The European Community put tariffs and quotas on (raw) sugar import from other countries. This assured the coherence of the quota system, and was the principal cause of the internal sugar price being way above the world market prices.

There were a number of trade agreements that allowed (groups of) third countries preferential access to the Community market. It meant that a certain amount / quotum of raw sugar could be imported at low or no duties. Above this quotum, duties were so high that almost no trade existed.

This imported raw cane sugar, in its refined form was allowed to be used for food uses.

=== Export disposal ===
The whole system of subsidized beet sugar production and subsidized raw cane sugar import and its refining in the European community, led to a European overproduction of white sugar. This had to be sold at low world market prices.

As long as the export was so-called A-Sugar or B-sugar, the losses were refunded by the Community. If it was C-sugar, it had to be exported by the end of the calendar year without getting subsidies. The export of the white sugar produced from raw sugar imported from the ACP countries was paid for by the Community budget.

== Developments ==
=== Increased production ===
Initially, there was an A quota of 6.48 Mt (million t) and a B quota of 2.05 Mt. Up to 1972 production increased by about a quarter. Acreage increased by 8%, and yields increased by 16%. By 1973 the rate of European self-sufficiency for sugar was 105%.

Sugar quotas for 1967/68
Country	Quotum
Belgium and Luxembourg	530,000 t
France	2,300,000 t
Germany	1,700,000 t
Italy	1,230,000 t
Netherlands	575,000 t
Total of quotas	6,335,000 t

=== New countries join (1973) ===
On 1 January 1973 Ireland, Denmark and the United Kingdom joined the European Community. The United Kingdom imported a lot raw sugar from cane, which was processed by its sugar refineries. The Community therefore succeeded to some of the United Kingdom's trade commitments with former colonies in Africa, the Caribbean and Pacific islands (The ACP countries). This gave preferential access to raw sugar equivalent to 1.3 Mt of white sugar, especially for 400,000 t from Australia. This ACP was bought for the intervention price and was not subject to levies. Subsidized sugar exports rose from negligible levels in 1971–1972 to 2 Mt in 1973, including some C-sugar. The European white sugar export related to the raw sugar import from the ACP countries was dubbed the equivalent amount.

=== Sugar market crisis and increases in prices and quotas ===
A worldwide drought in 1974 drove the price of Non-ACP imports to 2.6 times the EU intervention price. The drought also reduced EEC production by 1.1 Mt. Increased inflation and fears of sugar shortages then drove the EEC to action. For 1975/76 the A quota was increased to 9.14 Mt and the B quota to 4.1 Mt, the intervention priced was suddenly increased by 21%.

The changes led to strong increases in European sugar production. This peaked at 14.6 Mt in 1981/82, with a self-sufficiency rare of 155%. The increased production led to high costs that were not paid by the sector. In 1978 and 1979 this was about 100 million EUR a year.

=== Complaints at the GATT ===
In the early 1980s, the United States lodged complaints with the GATT. These alleged that the EEC export subsidies gave the community an abnormal share of the world sugar trade. Petitions by Australia and Brazil then made that the GATT ruled that EEC subsidies depressed world market prices. In 1982 the USA responded with sugar import quotas. The European policy on exports and stocks was partly responsible for its failure to join the International Sugar Agreement in 1984. The EEC responded by increasing its levies on quota sugar. These also decreased the B sugar price to a level about equivalent to the world market price. However, these measures did not substantially decrease its exports.

Later, the accession of Portugal in 1986 and Finland in 1995 led to accommodations for the sugar refineries in these countries. It allowed 82,000 t of raw sugar from Brazil and Cuba to be imported under Most Favored Nation arrangements.

=== The Uruguay Round Agreement on Agriculture (1995) ===
In 1995 the implementation of the Uruguay Round Agreement on Agriculture led to further changes. The EU agreed to reduce the amount of subsidized sugar exports by 21%, and to reduce the amount spent on subsidies by 36%. These reductions did not apply to the C-sugar exports or the white sugar export that was equivalent to the raw sugar import from ACP countries under preferential agreements.

=== The Everything But Arms initiative ===
In March 2001 the EU adopted the Everything But Arms (EBA) initiative, which aimed to give duty-free access to all goods exported by the least developed countries. Free access for sugar had to be realized starting with raw sugar import quotas in 2006, and leading to totally duty-free imports in 2009.

=== Pressure for reform ===
In time pressure to reform the quota system began to build up. The industrial users of sugar, which accounted for over 70% of consumption, were hindered by the high internal prices. These made that European processed products containing sugar were less competitive on world markets. Meanwhile, other sectors of the CAP were substantially reformed since 1992. These reforms moved away from price and production support measures, and move towards farm income support. This made the sugar regulations incoherent with the new orientations of the EU agricultural policy.

There were also international pressures to abolish the quota system. In a WTO dispute it was found that C-sugar exports were indeed benefitting from cross-subsidiation of within quota production. The EU practice of exempting the equivalent sugar export from preferential importants from its agreed reduction of export subsidies was also found to be contrary to treaty obligations. The Doha Development Round of the WTO led to an agreement to abolish all forms of agricultural export support by 2013.

=== Options (2001) ===
In 2001 the EU Council agreed to continue the CMO sugar regime till June 2006, but also asked the European Commission for proposals to replace the system. The EC described three options. The first option was to continue with the existing obligations and system. This was predicted to fail, because the least developed countries would ship their complete production to the EU under the EBA initiative. In time this would destroy even the most competitive European sugar production regions. A second option was to lower the internal market price and quotas. A lower price of about EUR 450 per tonne would diminish imports. The third scenario was a complete liberalization of the EU sugar market. It was expected that this would severely hurt the ACP countries and obliterate sugar production in the European Union.

=== Reform and restructuring (2005-2010) ===
In November 2005, the European Council agreed on a reform of the sugar quotas system. This had to comply with international obligations, and bring the CMO for sugar in line with the 2003 CAP reforms.

The intervention price for white sugar was to be cut from EUR 631.9/t to EUR 404.4/t in 2009/10. This would be called a reference price. The minimum price of sugar beet paid to farmers would be cut by 40%. A price reporting mechanism would monitor sugar prices throughout the union. After the restructuring period, the reference price would be used to determine when sugar had to be stored in a private storage system.

During a restructuring period from 2006/07 to 2009/10, the sugar production in the EU had to be reduced. The idea was to incite the less competitive sugar factories to leave the industry, while providing compensation for their owners and the social impact of closures. The planned reduction was from 18,540,000 t to about 12,500,000 t. The restructuring or buy out would be financed by a levy on all sugar produced during the time. The highest compensation would be given for factories that would close down with renunciation of their quotas. Other compensation was for beet growers, diversification measures and transition measures.

At first, the restructuring did not go according to plan. In November 2006 EU agriculture minister Mariann Fischer Boel announced that the renounced amount of quotas was far below expectations. It would lead to an expected surplus of 4.5 Mt of sugar in 2007/08. The minister therefore called upon the industry to take its responsibility, but also threatened with the linear cut of quotas which had been determined in case the restructuring would fail.

The restructuring of the sugar sector would cost about EUR 5.4 bln. It led to a substantial productivity improvement in the sector.

=== The end of the EU sugar quotas system (2013) ===
The original plan was to end the quota system in 2015. In 2013 the European Parliament and Member States decided on a CAP reform, and agreed to end the sugar quotas in September 2017.

== Current situation ==
After the end of the quota system, member states were allowed to provide voluntary coupled support linked to production. For sugar production, this was done by 11 member states.

The European Commission also allows and mandates collective bargaining by beet growers about all aspects of delivering beet, except for the price. This significantly strengthens their position towards the sugar manufacturers.

The Commission constantly provides market information and transparency to the sector. The Sugar Market Observatory is part of this effort.

The commission can grant private storage aid, in case market volatility would cause high losses for producers that cannot store their product.

As a final instrument, the commission can intervene on grounds of several disturbance clauses in the CMO regulation. These pertain to both sharp increases and sharp decreases in prices.
