= International Tin Council =

Defunct organization

The International Tin Council (ITC) was an organisation which acted on behalf of major tin producers and consumers to control the international tin market.

== Objectives ==
The objectives were:

- Prevent or alleviate widespread unemployment or under-employment and other serious difficulties which are likely to result from maladjustments between the supply of and the demand for tin.
- Prevent excessive fluctuations in the price of tin and achieve a reasonable degree of stability of price on a basis which will secure long-term equilibrium between supply and demand.
- Ensure adequate supplies of tin at reasonable prices at all times.
- Provide a framework for the consideration and development of measures to promote the progressively more economic production of tin while protecting tin deposits from unnecessary waste or premature abandonment.

== Members ==
The original consumer members were:

- Australia
- Brazil
- Belgium
- Canada
- Denmark
- Ecuador
- France
- Federal Republic of Germany
- India
- Italy
- Japan
- Lebanon
- Netherlands
- Switzerland
- Spain
- Turkey
- United Kingdom
- United States

The original producer members were:

- Belgian Congo and Ruanda-Urundi
- Indonesia
- Malaysia
- Nigeria
- Thailand

== History ==
An International Tin Study Group, which was established in 1947 to survey world supply of and demand for tin, led to the treaty, the International Tin Agreement, signed in 1954, and the formation of the ITC in 1956.

After the 1954 agreement, another agreement was signed every five years, in 1960, 1965, 1970, 1975, and 1980.

By the sixth agreement, established at the United Nations Tin Conference, 1980, new consumers included Finland, Greece, Ireland, Luxembourg, Norway, Portugal, and Sweden. New producers were Australia, Brazil and Zaire.

At various times Guinea, Mexico, Republic of Korea, the United Arab Republic, Israel, Liberia, Panama, Yugoslavia, Union of Soviet Socialist Republics, Poland, the Philippines, Czechoslovakia, Taiwan, Romania, Nicaragua, German Democratic Republic, and Austria held membership.

With the advent of aluminium containers, the use of protective polymer lacquers inside cans, and increased recycling by industry, the demand for tin decreased considerably by the early 1980s, and in October 1985 the ITC could no longer maintain the price. It eventually ran out of money buying up tin on the metals markets. Attempts to refinance the ITC were eventually abandoned, and since then, as with many other raw materials, the price has generally declined as alternatives become more attractive.

== Association of Tin Producing Countries ==
In 1984 an Association of Tin Producing Countries was created with members: Australia, Bolivia, Indonesia, Malaysia, Nigeria, Thailand, and Zaire. It ceased to exist in 2001.
