= International Dairy Agreement =

The International Dairy Agreement (IDA) replaced the International Dairy Arrangement, which had been established in 1980. Its primary function was to expand and liberalize world trade in dairy products through international cooperation. The agreement terminated in 1997.

An Arrangement concerning certain Dairy Products (Geneva, 12 January 1970), a treaty entered into by a number of nations, was established initially to set a minimum price of skimmed milk powder to $20 per 100 kilograms. The intention was to expand the arrangement to other dairy products. It also established a management committee within the General Agreement on Tariffs and Trade framework to oversee the arrangement. Three years later, a Protocol relating to Milk Fat (Geneva, 2 April 1973) was agreed to, extending the skimmed milk powder controls to other internationally transportable milk products, such as Ghee, anhydrous milk fat, anhydrous butteroil and anhydrous butterfat, butteroil and butterfat.

On January 1, 1995, the IDA was placed under the aegis of the World Trade Organization. Its members included Argentina, Bulgaria, the European Union, Japan, New Zealand, Romania, Switzerland, and Uruguay. The United States, which had been one of the original members, withdrew from the organization in 1985 to protest sales by the European Union of butter and other basic dairy products at prices below the minimum export prices established by the Committee on Certain Milk Products that, along with the International Dairy Council, administered the Arrangement. The International Dairy Council suspended minimum prices for dairy products in 1995.

The IDA was terminated, by decision of the International Dairy Council, as of January 1, 1998.
