= Paris Convention of 1919 =

1919 international convention

The Paris Convention of 1919 (formally, the Convention Relating to the Regulation of Aerial Navigation) was the first international convention to address the political difficulties and intricacies involved in international aerial navigation. The convention was concluded under the auspices of the International Commission for Air Navigation (forerunner to ICAO). It attempted to reduce the confusing patchwork of ideologies and regulations which differed by country by defining certain guiding principles and provisions, and was signed in Paris on 13 October 1919.

== History ==
The German DELAG, founded in 1909 a few weeks after a French company, was since 1910 the world's first airline in operation, using Zeppelin airships. The first passenger-carrying airline flight happened in 1914 with the rather short St. Petersburg-Tampa Airboat Line. Before that time, aircraft had been used to carry mail and other cargo. With the start of World War I in 1914, aircraft were being operated internationally to carry not only cargo, but also as military assets. The international use of aircraft brought up questions about air sovereignty. The arguments over air sovereignty at the time factored into one of two main viewpoints: either no state had a right to claim sovereignty over the airspace overlying its territory, or every state had the right to do so.

The Paris Convention of 1919 sought to determine this question as part of the process of framing the convention's assumptions, and it was decided that each nation has absolute sovereignty over the airspace overlying its territories and waters.

The nations that signed the treaty were: Belgium, Bolivia, Brazil, the British Empire, China, Cuba, Ecuador, France, Greece, Guatemala, Haiti, the Hejaz, Honduras, Italy, Japan, Liberia, Nicaragua, Panama, Peru, Poland, Portugal, Roumania, the Kingdom of Yugoslavia, Siam, Czechoslovakia, and Uruguay. Ultimately, the convention was ratified by 11 states, including Persia, which had not signed it. The United States never ratified it because of its linkage to the League of Nations. The treaty came into force in 1922.

German aviation was restricted after 1918 by the Military Inter-Allied Commission of Control

The Paris Convention was superseded by the Convention on International Civil Aviation (also known as the Chicago Convention).

== Principles ==
The following principles governed the drafting of the convention:

1. Each nation has absolute sovereignty over the airspace overlying its territories and waters. A nation, therefore, has the right to deny entry and regulate flights (both foreign and domestic) into and through its airspace.
2. Each nation should apply its airspace rules equally to its own and foreign aircraft operating within that airspace, and make rules such that its sovereignty and security are respected while affording as much freedom of passage as possible to its own and other signatories' aircraft.
3. Aircraft of contracting states are to be treated equally in the eyes of each nation's law.
4. Aircraft must be registered to a state, and they possess the nationality of the state in which they are registered.

== Contents ==
It had 9 chapters, dealing with:

- General Principles
- Nationality of aircraft
- Certificates of airworthiness and competency
- Admission to air navigation above foreign territory
- Rules to be observed on departure when under way and on landing
- Prohibited transport
- State aircraft
- International Commission for air navigation
- Final Provisions

== Related ==
- Convention on International Civil Aviation
- Warsaw Convention
