= International Grains Council =

Intergovernmental organization

Three other official names
- - French: Conseil International des Céréales
  - Spanish: Consejo Internacional de Cereales
  - Russian: Международный Cовет по Зерну
- Logo
- Headquarters: London, England
- Official languages: English; French; Russian; Spanish
- Type: Intergovernmental organization

Government
  - Executive Director: Arnaud Petit

Establishment
  - International Wheat Council: 23 March 1949 (77 years ago)
  - International Grains Agreement: 1 July 1995 (31 years ago)
- Website www.igc.int

The International Grains Council (IGC) is an intergovernmental organization which oversees the Grains Trade Convention and seeks to promote cooperation in the global grain trade. It’s tasked with enhancing market stability and world food security through providing impartial analysis on supply and demand fundamentals in the grains and oilseed sectors and improving transparency through regular reporting on market and policy developments. It was established in 1949 as the International Wheat Council, and its present name was adopted in 1995.

The IGC's data, analysis and reporting are used by member governments, private organizations and other international bodies concerned with grain market developments. The IGC's benchmark Grains and Oilseeds Index, which tracks international grain and oilseed prices, is publicly available on the organization's website. The IGC Secretariat also administers the Food Assistance Convention, provides administrative services to the Food Assistance Committee and forms part of the secretariat of Agricultural Market Information System.

The headquarters are in London, where the IGC hosts the annual Grains Conference which brings international buyers and sellers, industry representatives and policy makers together.

The definition of "grains" was formally expanded to include rice (1 July 2009) and oilseeds (1 July 2013).

The Food Aid Convention of 1995 added pulses to the list. This Convention was subsequently renegotiated and replaced by the Food Aid Convention of 1999, which considerably broadened the list of eligible products.

The Food Aid Convention, 1999 expired on 30 June 2012 and a new Food Assistance Convention entered into force on 1 January 2013. The new Food Assistance Convention is a separate legal instrument, independent of the GTC. At the 35th IGC Council Session in June 2012 members approved a request that the IGC Secretariat continue to provide administrative services to the new Food Assistance Committee.

== Food Assistance Convention, 2013 ==
The negotiation of a new Food Assistance Convention began in early 2011. The text of the Food Assistance Convention was adopted on 25 April 2012 by the negotiating Parties, endorsed by the Food Aid Committee and opened for signature on 11 June 2012 by the United Nations. It entered into force on 1 January 2013.

The new Food Assistance Convention expands the traditional focus of previous Food Aid Conventions to include all forms of food assistance that will protect and improve access to food for those most in need. The new Convention includes a new commitment structure, a broader toolbox of eligible activities and food assistance products, as well as a commitment to improved transparency and accountability.

== Council membership ==
As of April 2020 its membership comprises 11 producing members and 18 importing members:

=== Exporting member countries ===
- Argentina
- Australia
- Canada
- European Union
- India
- Kazakhstan
- Russian Federation
- Serbia
- Turkey
- Ukraine
- United States

=== Importing member countries ===
- Algeria
- Cuba
- Egypt
- Iran
- Iraq
- Ivory Coast
- Japan
- Kenya
- South Korea
- Morocco
- Norway
- Oman
- Pakistan
- Saudi Arabia
- South Africa
- Switzerland
- Tunisia
- Vatican City

== See also ==
- International relations
- List of multilateral free-trade agreements
