= International Grains Agreement =

The International Grains Agreement (IGA) is an international agreement focused on the grain trade which replaced the International Wheat Agreement in 1995, comprises a Grains Trade Convention (GTC) and a Food Aid Convention (FAC). The IGA is administered by the International Grains Council (IGC), an intergovernmental forum for cooperation on wheat and coarse grain matters.

The Grains Trade Convention provides for information-sharing, analysis and consultations on grain market and policy developments. Under the Food Aid Convention, donor countries pledge to provide annually specified amounts of food aid to developing countries in the form of grain suitable for human consumption, or cash to buy suitable grains in recipient countries. The International Grains Agreement does not contain any mechanisms for stabilizing supplies, prices, or trade.
