= International Sugar Organization =

London-based intergovernmental council

- Logo of the International Sugar Organization
- Abbreviation: ISO
- Formation: 3 December 1968 (57 years ago)
- Type: International organization
- Purpose: Sugar trade
- Headquarters: London, E14; United Kingdom
- Coordinates: 51.5049489°N 0.0216893°W
- Region served: International
- Members: 87 state members
- Executive Director: José Orive
- Website: www.isosugar.org

The International Sugar Organization is an intergovernmental organization, based in London, which was established under international sugar agreement of 1968.

Unlike its predecessors under pre-1968 versions of the International Sugar Agreement, it does not have the power to regulate the international sugar trade by price-setting or export quotas but seeks to promote the trade in and consumption of sugar by gathering and publishing information on the sugar market, research into new uses for sugar and related products and as a forum for intergovernmental discussions on sugar. As of June 2017, its membership consisted of 87 countries.

== History ==
Since 1937, a series of temporary International agreements on Sugar attempted to regulate global demand and supply. Initially, an International Sugar Council was established, until the United Nations Conference on Trade and Development in 1968 recommended a more permanent arrangement through the International Sugar Organization.

== See also ==
- Triangular trade
