= Food and Fertilizer Technology Center =

International organization

Food and Fertilizer Technology Center for the Asian and Pacific Region
- Logo of the Food and Fertilizer Technology Center for the Asian and Pacific Region
- Abbreviation: FFTC
- Formation: 11 September 1969 (57 years ago)
- Type: International organization
- Purpose: Agricultural science
- Headquarters: Taipei, Taiwan
- Coordinates: 25.0255564°N 121.5335793°E
- Region served: Asia Pacific
- Members: 7 Active state members
- Director: Dr. Su-San Chang
- Website: www.fftc.org.tw

The Food and Fertilizer Technology Center for the Asian and Pacific Region was established by treaty in Kawana, Japan on 11 June 1969.

The center is based in Taipei, the current members are: Japan, Taiwan, South Korea, the Philippines, Vietnam, Malaysia, and Thailand with Indonesia as an observer. Previous members included Australia, Laos and New Zealand.

The center publishes a technical bulletin.
