= Agreement Between the Allied and Associated Powers with Regard to the Italian Reparation Payments =

1919 agreement between the Allied Powers

The Agreement between the Allied and Associated Powers with Regard to the Contribution to the Cost of Liberation of the Territories of the Former Austro-Hungarian Monarchy was concluded on 10 September 1919 and complemented the Saint-Germain peace treaty with Austria.

It was concluded between the governments of Italy and the other main Allied Powers of the First World War in order to regulate the issue of war reparations exacted from the Austrian government in the peace treaty. Since most of the territories of the Austro-Hungarian Empire were now ceded either to existing states (such as Italy and Romania) or were incorporated into newly created states (such as Czechoslovakia, Yugoslavia and Poland), it was decided that some of the war reparations due to be exacted from the Austrian government would be actually exacted from the former territories of its empire that were now in the hands of other states.

Article I of the treaty acknowledged the Italian sacrifices in the war, and accepted the Italian willingness to pay part of the reparations from the territories Italy got from Austria as the result of the war (South Tyrol). Articles II-IV set the ratio between reparations to be borne by the Austrian government and those to be borne by the territories newly added to Italy.

The treaty was registered in the League of Nations Treaty Series on 21 October 1920.

The agreement was modified by a declaration issued by the signatory parties on 8 December 1919, which allowed the Italian government to issue bonds over a longer period of time to pay off its debts.

== See also ==
- Treaty of Saint-Germain-en-Laye (1919)
- Agreement between the Allied and Associated Powers with Regard to the Contribution to the Cost of Liberation of the Territories of the Former Austro-Hungarian Monarchy
