= Commonwealth Telecommunications Organisation =

Telecommunications organization

- Logo of the Commonwealth Telecommunications Organisation
- Abbreviation: CTO
- Formation: 11 May 1948 (77 years ago)
- Type: International organization
- Purpose: Telecommunications
- Headquarters: London, United Kingdom
- Coordinates: 51.4945173°N 0.2314831°W
- Region served: Commonwealth of Nations
- Members: 33 full state members
- Secretary-General: Bernadette Lewis
- Website: www.cto.int

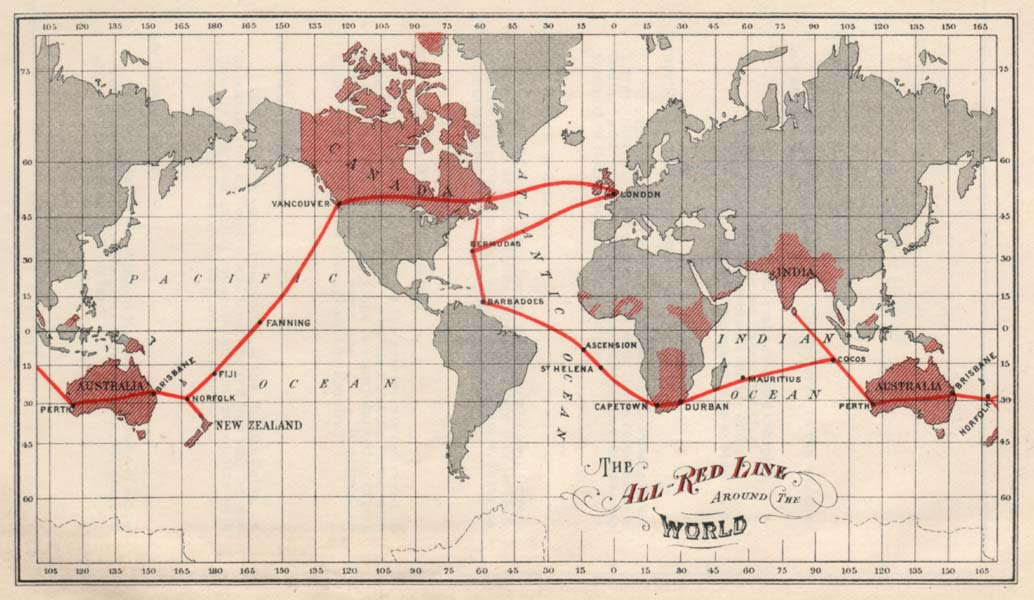
Sketch map of the All Red Line drawn in 1902 or 1903

The Commonwealth Telecommunications Organisation (CTO) traces to the British Empire's Pacific Cable Board in 1901, though in its current form, was created by international treaty, the Commonwealth Telegraphs Agreement between Commonwealth nations signed in London on 11 May 1948.

The CTO connects government and non-government entities to enhance cooperation in information and communication technology (ICT).

== History ==
To oversee the completion of the All Red Line telegraph system interlinking the British Empire, the Pacific Cable Board was formed in 1901.

In the final years of the British Empire, with a number of states federated or close to independence, a treaty with clearer financial divisions, responsibilities, and governance was established that would eventually replace the Pacific Cable Board. The Commonwealth Telegraphs Agreement was signed between Commonwealth nations in London, 1948 that formed the Commonwealth Telecommunications Organisation.

== Members ==
The government members of the CTO are:

Bangladesh	Barbados	Botswana
Cameroon	Eswatini	Fiji
Ghana	Grenada	Guyana
India	Jamaica	Kenya
Lesotho	Malawi	Mauritius
Mozambique	Nigeria	Pakistan
Rwanda	Saint Kitts and Nevis	Samoa
Seychelles	Sierra Leone	South Africa
Sri Lanka	Tanzania	Tonga
Trinidad and Tobago	Tuvalu	Uganda
United Kingdom	Vanuatu	Zambia
Bermuda (Affiliate)	Gibraltar (Affiliate)	Montserrat (Affiliate)
Saint Helena (Affiliate)		
The Bahamas (ICT Sector)	Namibia (ICT Sector)	Zimbabwe (ICT sector)

ICT sector members include Avanti Communications, British Telecom, Facebook, Huawei, Intelsat, PwC London, Safaricom, and Vodafone.

== See also ==
- Internet Service Providers Association
- International Telecommunication Union
- List of telecommunications regulatory bodies
