= Agreement between the Allied and Associated Powers with Regard to the Contribution to the Cost of Liberation of the Territories of the Former Austro-Hungarian Monarchy =

1919 agreement between the Allied Powers

An agreement signed between the Allied Powers of the First World War on 10 September 1919. The agreement was registered in the League of Nations Treaty Series on 21 October 1920.

The agreement was concerned with states which either were established or gained new territories following the dissolution of the Austro-Hungarian Empire - Romania, Poland, Yugoslavia and Czechoslovakia.

Article 1 of the agreement stipulated for the payment by the above governments of 1.5 billion Gold Francs as the cost for gaining these new territories. Article 2 laid the rules for distribution of the payments between the said above governments. Articles 3-5 stipulated the sums will be deducted from the war reparations these governments were to receive from the Austrian government.

== See also ==
- Treaty of Saint-Germain-en-Laye (1919)
- Agreement Between the Allied and Associated Powers with Regard to the Italian Reparation Payments
