= International Sugar Agreement =

1968 international treaty

The International Sugar Agreements and similarly named agreements were a series of International treaties that attempted to establish an "orderly relationship between the supply and demand for sugar in the world market." They eventually established the International Sugar Organization.

== Agreements ==
There have been a number of sugar agreements:

- 1937 International Agreement regarding the Regulation of Production and Marketing of Sugar, and Protocol (London, 6 May 1937) that established in Article 2 to "always to assure consumers of an adequate supply of sugar on the world market at a reasonable price not to exceed the cost of production, including a reasonable profit, of efficient producers". It established an International Sugar Council and set quotas for the International free market of sugar.
- 1942 - Protocol to enforce and to prolong the International Agreement regarding the Regulation of Production and Marketing of Sugar of 6 May 1937 (London, 22 July 1942) a wartime treaty that extended the original agreement to 31 August 1944.
- 1944 - Protocol extending the Agreement regarding the Regulation of the Production and Marketing of Sugar of 6 May 1937 (London, 31 August 1944) that again extended the agreement to 31 August 1945, and recognised the newly forming United Nations in setting global commodity policy. It also made parts of the original agreement inoperative, especially the quotas and other restrictions.
- 1945-1952 - The agreement was extended each year for another 12 months. The original agreement of 1937, as renewed, lapsed on 31 August 1953.
- 1953 - International Sugar Agreement (London, 1 October 1953) was signed similar to the 1937 agreement.
- 1956 - Protocol amending the International Sugar Agreement of 1 October 1953 (London, 1 December 1956) established at the United Nations Sugar Conference of 1956 with minor amendments and a new quota.
- 1958 - International Sugar Agreement of 1958 (London, 1 December 1958).
- 1963 - Protocol for the Prolongation of the International Sugar Agreement of 1 December 1958 (London, 1 August 1963) established at the United Nations Sugar Conference, 1963.
- 1965 - Protocol for the Further Prolongation of the International Sugar Agreement of 1 December 1958 (London, 1 November 1965).
- 1968 - International Sugar Agreement, 1968 (New York City, 3 December 1968) formulated at the United Nations Conference on Trade and Development also establishing the International Sugar Organization.
- 1976 - Extension of the International Sugar Agreement of 13 October 1973 (London, 30 September 1975)
- 1977 - Further Extension of the International Sugar Agreement of 13 October 1973 (London, 18 June 1976)
- 1978 - International Sugar Agreement, 1977 (Geneva, 7 October 1977)
- 1984 - International Sugar Agreement, 1984 (Geneva, 5 July 1984)
- 1987 - International Sugar Agreement, 1987 (London, 11 September 1987)
