= Asia-Pacific Fishery Commission =

Intergovernmental organization

- Logo of the Asia-Pacific Fishery Commission
- Abbreviation: APFIC
- Formation: 9 November 1948 (77 years ago)
- Type: Food and Agriculture Organization Article XIV body
- Purpose: aquaculture
- Headquarters: Bangkok, Thailand
- Coordinates: 13.7624277°N 100.4936739°E
- Region served: Asia Pacific
- Members: 21 Active state members
- Website: www.fao.org/apfic/en/

The Asia-Pacific Fishery Commission (APFIC), originally called the Indo-Pacific Fisheries Council (IPFC) is a Food and Agriculture Organization (FAO) Article XIV Regional Fisheries Body which covers fisheries, aquaculture and related aquatic resource issues in the Asia-Pacific region. APFIC functions as a Regional Consultative Forum raising awareness amongst member countries, fisheries organizations and fisheries professionals in the Asia-Pacific region.

In recent years, APFIC has covered a range of regional fisheries issues, including co-management of fisheries, low value/trash fish (may be referred to as bycatch where not targeted catch) in the region, illegal, unreported and unregulated fishing (IUU) and fishing capacity management, certification in fisheries (e.g. ecolabel) and aquaculture, ecosystem approach to fisheries and aquaculture and improving resilience of fishery livelihoods. Most recently work has focussed on developing a training course for Ecosystem Approach to Fishery Management and guidelines for tropical trawl fisheries management.

The Secretariat is housed in the FAO Regional Office for Asia and the Pacific in Bangkok, Thailand.

== Achievements ==
APFIC encourages responsible aquatic resource use, improves fisheries and aquaculture management, and enhances fisheries sector institutions. The commission supports the ecosystem approach to fisheries (EAF), which preserves marine ecosystem integrity and optimizes resource usage.

In addition, APFIC promotes sustainable aquaculture. This project shares practices and develops a national aquaculture plan to boost food security and economic growth. APFIC boosts regional collaboration in helping governments improve monitoring, control, and surveillance to protect marine ecosystems and the legal fishing sector from illegal, unreported, and unregulated fishing.

APFIC's mission includes capacity building and knowledge sharing. To train fishermen professionals in member countries, the commission offers fisheries management, stock assessment, and data collection courses. These efforts have improved aquatic resource management and institutional capacity.

APFIC advocates for sustainable practices that enhance the livelihoods of small-scale fishermen by assisting member countries in integrating relevant guidelines into national policies and conducting awareness-raising workshops.

APFIC promotes fisheries adaptation and resilience to climate change. The Climate Change Adaptation Program in Fisheries and Aquaculture is known for sharing habitat restoration and sustainable aquaculture knowledge. The Ecosystem Approach to Fisheries Management (EAFM) training course teaches fisheries professionals how to manage fisheries for ecological and socioeconomic benefits. APFIC also holds Regional Consultative Forum Meetings (RCFM) to discuss climate adaptation strategies, share successes, and create regional action plans.

Moreover, APFIC promotes science and management collaboration to incorporate data and technology. APFIC conducts research to reconstruct marine fisheries catches. This has provided a more accurate understanding of declining fish stocks and highlighted the need for sustainable management.

== Country membership ==
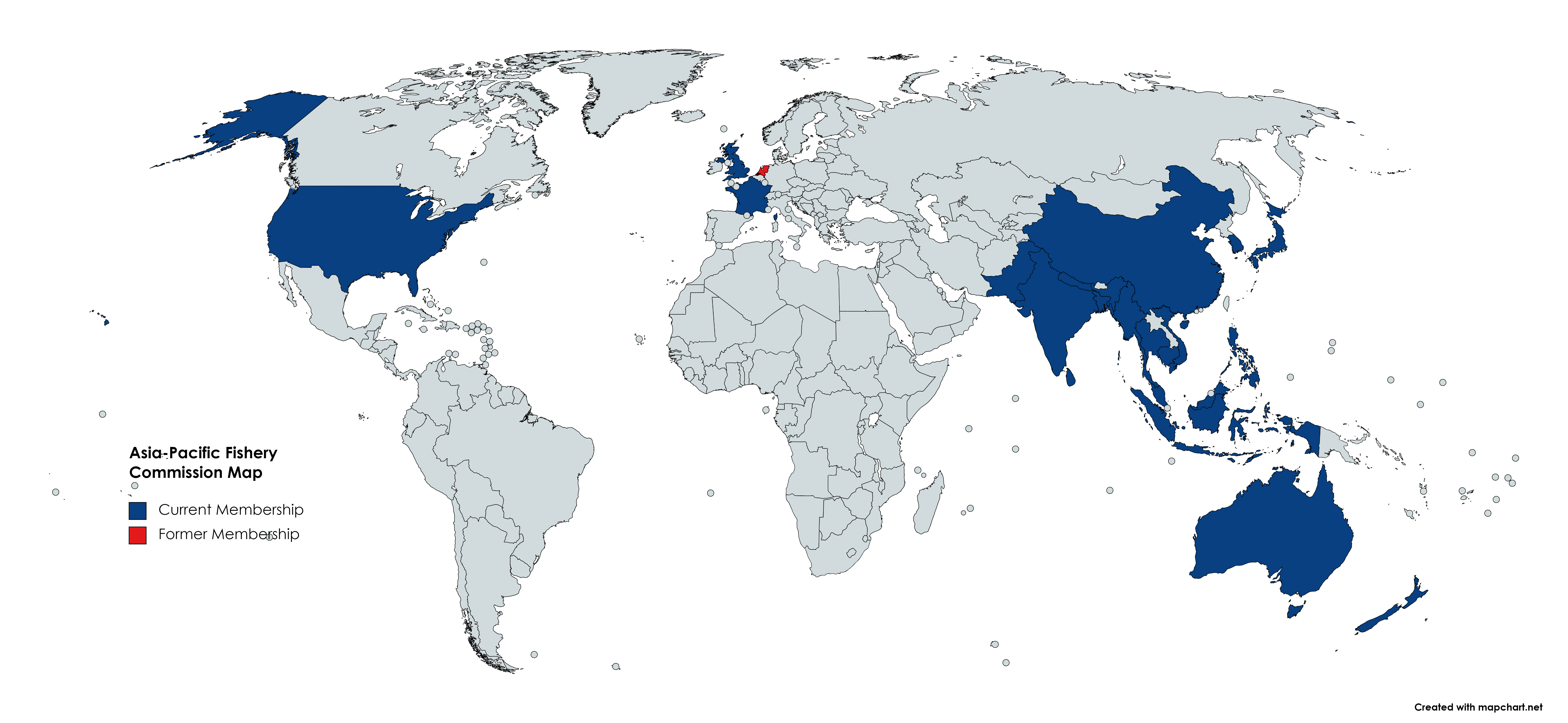
Asia Pacific Fishery Commission Map

According to the Agreement on the Establishment of the Asia-Pacific Fishery Commission, eligibility for membership is based on:

Member Nations and Associate Members of the Food and Agriculture Organization (FAO) which accept the Agreement in accordance with Article X thereof. Other States that are Members of the United Nations, any of its Specialized Agencies or the International Atomic Energy Agency may be admitted as members by a two-thirds majority of the Commission's members.

The current member countries are: Australia, Bangladesh, Cambodia, People's Republic of China, France, India, Indonesia, Japan, Republic of Korea, Malaysia, Myanmar, Nepal, New Zealand, Pakistan, Philippines, Vietnam, Sri Lanka, Timor Leste, Thailand, United Kingdom, United States

A former member state is the Netherlands.

== APFIC area of competence ==
In Article VI of the APFIC Agreement the 'APFIC area' is described as:

Area - The Commission shall carry out the functions and responsibilities set forth in Article IV in the Asia-Pacific Area.

Comment

This description is a broad definition of the area where APFIC will conduct its work. APFIC is competent in both marine and inland waters of its area of competence. The abolition of the Indian Ocean Fishery Commission (IOFC) and its Committee for the Development and Management of Fisheries in the Bay of Bengal (BOBC) in June 1999 resulted in closer involvement of APFIC in this sub-region, as the functions of BOBC was transferred to APFIC by the FAO Council's Resolution 1/116 (Report of the 116th Session of the FAO Council). This was subsequently endorsed by the 26th Session of APFIC in Beijing 1998.

There is no change to the APFIC agreement in terms of membership, area of competence and functions of the commission, there have been subsequent recommendations by the commission to clarify where its focus of work should lie. The Report APFIC Ad hoc Legal and Financial Working Group proposed that APFIC concentrate its activities on three subregions of the Asia-Pacific:

• the Yellow Sea and its adjacent waters
• the South China Sea and its adjacent waters and
• the Bay of Bengal.

As APFIC adapts to the changing needs of fisheries and aquaculture in the Asia-Pacific, its role and function have been clarified as part of the development of a Strategic Plan for the commission.

== See also ==
- Western and Central Pacific Fisheries Commission
- Pacific Community
- BOBPIGO Bay of Bengal Programme IGO
- Southeast Asian Fisheries Development Center
