= International Institute of Refrigeration =

Company

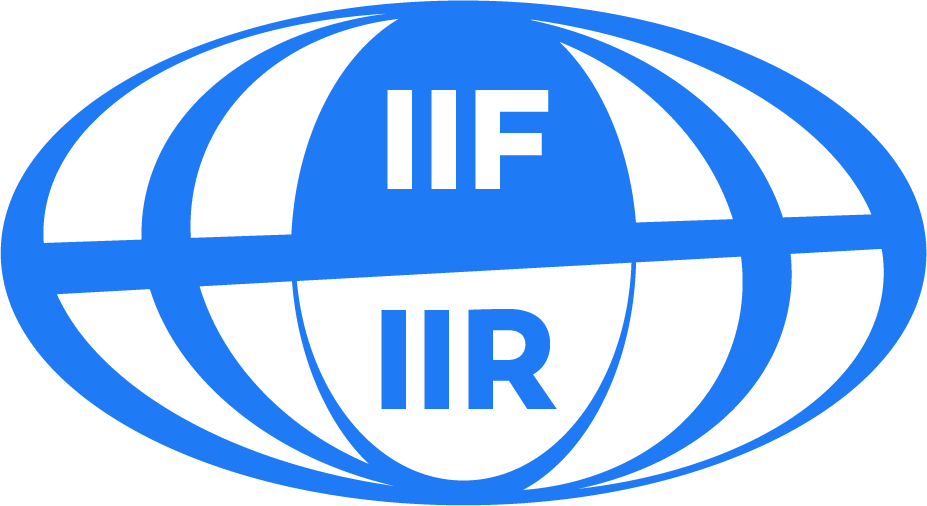
- IIR corporate logo
- Type: Independent intergovernmental organisation
- Industry: All refrigeration technologies and applications; Cryogenics and liquefied gases; Thermodynamic equipment and systems; Biology and food technology; Storage and transport; Air conditioning, heat pumps, and energy recovery
- Founded: 1908
- Headquarters: 177 Boulevard Malesherbes, 75017, Paris, France
- Area served: Worldwide
- Members: 59 member countries, over 300 experts in all fields of refrigeration IIR Member Countries
- Website: www.iifiir.org

The Institut International du Froid (IIF), French for the International Institute of Refrigeration (IIR), is an independent intergovernmental science and technology-based organisation that promotes knowledge of refrigeration and associated technologies and applications on a global scale that improve quality of life in a cost-effective and environmentally sustainable manner. Areas of focus include:

- Food quality and safety from farm to consumer
- Comfort in homes and commercial buildings
- Health products and services
- Low temperature technology and liquefied gas technology
- Energy efficiency
- Use of non-ozone-depleting and low global warming refrigerants in a safe manner.

Its scientific and technical activities are coordinated by ten commissions, which are divided into five distinct sections.

== History ==
The early 19th century witnessed a sharp increase in the demand for natural ice during the summer months, particularly among breweries producing lager. Due to the advent of railways and steam ships, natural ice was able to be transported efficiently and thus became more readily attainable. To meet the demand for ice, suppliers began investing in methods of producing ice by artificial means.

Though it was first documented by Oliver Evans, it was Jacob Perkins, an American working in England, who first patented a machine using the vapour-compression cycle to produce a cooling effect in 1835.

In 1855, the first industrial-scale compression machines were developed by James Harrison. Following this, Ferdinand Carré invented the absorption device in 1859. This was then rendered obsolete by the invention of the vapor compression refrigerator invented by French engineer Charles Tellier in 1885, the basic principles of which are used today.

To support the development of refrigeration technologies and in view of the economic development potential they represented, the IIR was created in several stages:

- October 5–10, 1908 - The rapidly growing, global industry and scientific quest for absolute zero led to the 1st International Congress of Refrigeration held in Paris, France, at the Paris-Sorbonne University, which welcomed over 5,000 participants.
- January 25, 1909 - From this first Congress, the International Association of Refrigeration was born, formed by delegates from 35 countries.
- June 21, 1920 - The association was reorganised and officially titled as the International Institute of Refrigeration – IIR (Institut International du Froid – IIF, in French).

IIR's status as an international organisation was defined by an International Agreement signed on December 1, 1954, and General Regulations for the Application of the International Agreements signed on November 20, 1956.

Since then, the IIR has been operating at its headquarters based in Paris and is now an international organisation for expertise on refrigeration. The institute has continued to run the International Congress of Refrigeration every four years since its inauguration and has now expanded its event portfolio to ten conference series covering a wide variety of refrigeration topics. Working alongside governments, today the IIR remains committed to promoting knowledge on refrigeration for sustainable development, and continues to provide key services to disseminate information on associated technologies to all stakeholders (companies, universities, professionals, etc.).

== Organisation ==
The IIR is a bilingual organisation that works in both English and French, and operates thanks to:

- the activities of its international network, comprising over 300 Commission members
- its benefactor, corporate and private members
- the annual contributions from its 59 member countries.

=== Statutory bodies ===
==== General Conference ====
The General Conference of the IIR defines the general policy of the IIR and convenes once every four years during its international congress. It includes representatives appointed by member countries.

The General Conference elects the president and vice presidents of the executive committee.

==== Executive Committee ====
The Executive Committee of the IIR handles the administrative and financial aspects of the daily running of the IIR and meets once per year. It includes one delegate per member country, a president and three to six vice-presidents.

==== Management Committee ====
The Management Committee is responsible for the general management of the IIR between Executive Committee meetings. It includes:

- the President of the Executive Committee
- three members elected every four years by the Executive Committee
- three members elected every four years by the Science and Technology Council

=== Science and Technology Council ===
The Science and Technology Council (STC) coordinates the scientific and technical activities of the IIR. The Science and Technology Council includes five distinct Sections that are divided into ten Commissions. The Science and Technology Council includes:

- one President
- six Vice Presidents
- ten Commission Presidents
- one congress liaison contact person.

=== Commissions ===
The scientific activities of the IIR are organised into five Sections, each of which is divided into two Commissions. Thus, there are 10 Commissions:

==== Section A: Cryogenics and Liquefied Gases ====
Section A on Cryogenics and Liquefied Gases focuses on refrigeration science and technology at low temperatures: the cryogenic domain spans the lower part of the temperature scale, from absolute zero to 120 K, thus encompassing the normal boiling points of air gases as well as of liquid natural gas (LNG).

Section A comprises two Commissions, A1 Cryophysics and Cryoengineering, and A2 Liquefaction and Separation of Gases. Commission A1 deals with research, development and industrial activities at the lowest temperatures, including low-temperature physics, applications of superconductivity and helium cryogenics. Commission A2 essentially covers the liquefied gas industry, including air separation and LNG technology, two mature domains with high economic stakes and ongoing developments addressing important societal issues such as energy efficiency and carbon sequestration.

Section A also maintains and develops relations with other Sections of the IIR, mainly Commission B1 Thermodynamics and Transfer Processes in the field of thermodynamics and transfer processes, essential tools of the cryogenic engineer, and Commission C1 Cryobiology, Cryomedicine and Health Products for the cooling of biological specimens and living tissues for preservation or treatment, which require implementing cryogenic processes. Section A consists of a panel of multidisciplinary professionals and experts in sciences and technologies such as thermodynamics, condensed matter physics, materials science, heat transfer, fluid dynamics, vacuum and leak-tightness, instrumentation and process control, applied to the low-temperature domain.

- Commission A1: Cryophysics and Cryoengineering

Commission A1 on Cryophysics and Cryoengineering deals with research, development and industrial activities at the lowest temperatures, including low-temperature physics, applications of superconductivity and helium cryogenics.

- Commission A2: Liquefaction and Separation of Gases

The work of "Commission A2: Liquefaction and Separation of Gases" reflects worldwide activities in the domain of separation of gases and liquefaction. Apart from the personal involvement of Commission members in various projects, the commission is present at conferences, workshops and seminars: LNG International Exhibition and Conference, GASTECH, Cryogenics, Cryogen Expos, European Cryogenic Course and others.

The commission is close to academia, industry and end users of separated and liquefied gases. Commission members work closely with Commission A1 Cryophysics, Cryoengineering and Commission C1 Cryobiology, Cryomedicine and Health Products.

==== Section B: Thermodynamics, Equipment and Systems ====
Section B on Thermodynamics, Equipment and Systems of the IIR focuses on the technological and scientific fundamentals of classical refrigeration, excluding cryogenic temperatures. The fundamentals are represented by its Commission B1 Thermodynamics and Transfer Processes, whereas Commission B2 Refrigerating Equipment covers all kinds of refrigeration technology. Section B is a key player in most of the IIR international conferences; except for the International Conference of Refrigeration (ICR), organised every four years for all 10 IIR Commissions, where approximately 50% of all presentations are related to Section B topics.

Independently, and together with other Sections, Section B hosts a multitude of conferences such as the Gustav Lorentzen Conference on Natural Working Fluids and the Ohrid Conference on Ammonia and CO_{2} Refrigeration Technologies; or conferences on Thermodynamic Properties and Transfer Processes of Refrigerants, on Magnetic Refrigeration at Room Temperature, on Compressors and Coolants, and on Phase Change Materials and Slurries for Refrigeration and Air Conditioning.

Several Working Groups, where emerging topics in refrigeration are discussed by IIR experts to publish results in handbooks or other forms of publications, are organised within the scope of Section B. Main topics include mitigation of direct emissions of greenhouse gases in refrigeration, refrigerant charge reduction in refrigerating systems, magnetic cooling, life cycle climate performance evaluation, and refrigerant system safety.

- Commission B1: Thermodynamics and Transfer Processes

The objectives of Commission B1 on Thermodynamics and Transfer Processes are to provide academic and industrial information and data, and to propose any solutions on thermodynamics and transfer processes. The Commission B1 has been extremely active in IIR Working Groups, sub-commissions, IIR conferences, co-sponsored conferences, and commission business meetings.

As well as being involved in IIR Working Groups on the mitigation of direct emissions of greenhouse gases in refrigeration, the commission is equally involved in the Working Group on Life Cycle Climate Performance (LCCP) Evaluation.

Active in IIR conferences and congresses, Commission B1 similarly organises workshops in various fields such as refrigerant charge reduction in refrigerating systems. Initiatives and opportunities, such as the phase-down of high-GWP refrigerants, energy-efficient buildings and cars, transport refrigeration, food preservation, the economic importance of the refrigeration sector, the involvement of the younger generation and identifying industrial needs are all at the heart of Commission B1.

- Commission B2: Refrigerating Equipment

Commission B2 Refrigerating Equipment participates in many IIR activities aimed at promoting knowledge of refrigeration technologies and their applications worldwide. It is a key Commission for most IIR activities, synergising with other Commissions. The Commission is very active in various IIR Working Groups on Magnetic Cooling and Refrigeration Safety.

==== Section C: Biology and Food Technology ====
The activities of Section C deal with the application of refrigeration technologies to life sciences and food sciences.

Commission C1 Cryobiology, cryomedicine and health products is particularly focused on the application of refrigeration technologies on various branches of medicine: cryosurgery and oncology, cryotherapy, blood, organs and tissue preservation, health products (especially vaccines and thermosensitive preparations). On the one hand, the work focuses on the biological and biochemical aspects of the effects of refrigeration on organs, tissues and treated products, and on the other hand, on the applied refrigeration techniques and technologies.

Commission C2 food science and engineering is focused more particularly on the application of refrigeration technologies in the area of food sciences: preservation (refrigeration, freezing); hygiene and safety in its microbiological aspect; process (lyophilisation, cryoconcentration, cryoprecipitation, partial or total crystallisation). The work focuses on establishing a model for the transfer of heat and matter during refrigeration treatments, on the effects of refrigeration on food products, and on the evolution kinetics of products kept in cold storage. The work deals with the impact of the integrity of the cold chain on the quality of food, including in warm climate countries.

- Commission C1: Cryobiology, Cryomedicine and Health Products

Commission C1 Cryobiology, Cryomedicine and Health Products have clearly defined objectives in cryobiology, cryomedicine and health products research; knowledge dissemination; technology transfer and education.

This commission participates in the various workshop series on cryoprocessing of biopharmaceuticals and biomaterials, as well as establishing training actions concerning the commission's multidisciplinary and interdisciplinary needs, including for the following commissions: A1 Cryophysics, Cryoengineering, A2 Liquefaction and Separation of Gases, and C1 Cryobiology, Cyomedicine and Health Products.

- Commission C2: Food Science and Engineering

Commission C2 on Food Science and Engineering focuses on research and breakthrough technologies related to food science and engineering. The commission is key in hosting the IIR Sustainability and the Cold Chain Conference (ICCC), held internationally since 2010. In addition to the Cold Chain conferences and the IIR Congress, Commission C2 has also co-sponsored four other conferences in Macedonia, Spain, Croatia and Germany, and continues to reinforce its leading role at the heart of developments in food science and engineering.

The commission is involved in various IIR Working Groups and innovative projects linked to the development of the food chain across the globe.

==== Section D: Storage and Transport ====
Section D ON Storage and Transport of the IIR is involved in the controlled-temperature logistics and distribution of temperature-sensitive products, from foodstuffs to health products (medicines, vaccines, blood products, organs, etc.), from artwork to chemicals.

It addresses all issues of equipment and solutions for a durable cold chain from the production or manufacture to the consumption or use of these products.

Section D thus covers the issues of storage, transportation by land, air or water, packaging, distribution and delivery of these products to the consumer, and the traceability of the cold chain.

The Section is involved in warehouse and platform equipment, devices for temperature-controlled transport, coolants or cool packs, small coolers and refrigerated containers, chillers, refrigerated furnishings, refrigerated cabinets, climate chambers, refrigerators and freezers, but also in thermometers and temperature recorders.

The cold chain involves many temperature ranges, both positive and negative, from -80°C to + 63°C.

- Commission D1: Refrigerated Storage

Commission D1 on Refrigerated Storage deals with the storage of all products which require temperature control, such as food and pharmaceuticals. Industrial, commercial and residential storage are also taken into account so that, in cooperation with Commission D2 Refrigerated Transport, the entire cold chain is treated, from raw materials to the final product at our home. Refrigeration plays an essential role in perishable products. While the estimated capacity of refrigerated warehouses was over 500 million cubic meters worldwide in 2014, in some countries, global food losses due to the lack of a cold chain are still very important and can reach as much as 20% of the global food supply. At the same time, in heavily industrialised countries, the use of commercial and domestic refrigerators accounts for up to 6% of global electricity consumption.

As a result, the Commission faces important issues in order to promote widespread, energy-efficient, and environmentally friendly storage systems. New refrigerants, synergies to save or exchange energy with other systems, and new technologies are the main focus of its activity. One of the most important themes these days for this commission is energy efficiency.

- Commission D2: Refrigerated Transport

The IIR's Commission D2 on Refrigerated Transport is extremely active. In addition to the IIR's four-yearly congress, Commission D2 participates in the IIR Conference on Sustainability and the Cold Chain, held out of synchronisation with the congress.

Every year, Commission D2 CERTE test engineers meet in a European country to discuss refrigerated transport technology and testing issues. This group subsequently advises the United Nations working party on transport of perishable foodstuffs held each year in Geneva. Commission D2 is currently addressing the “Cold Chain for Pharmaceutical Products” and will add this to regular transport discussion and advisory topics. Commission D2 also helps to produce Informatory Notes to assist in areas of technical or regulatory difficulty.

The IIR is recognised, for its contributions to refrigerated transport, particularly through the work of its Commission D2. The commission's research addresses food waste reduction and emissions mitigation.

==== Section E: Air Conditioning, Heat Pumps, and Energy Recovery ====
IIR's Section E coordinates the work of both "Commission E1: Air-Conditioning" and "Commission E2: Heat Pumps and Heat Recovery".

The core activities and interests of both Commissions are strongly connected, resulting in tight collaboration and jointly organised conferences.

Air-conditioning is a subject that is now more frequently addressed due to both better comfort in an increasing number of countries and the effects of global warming. Now, even countries where demand for air-conditioning during summer months was limited, due to a cooler climate, require the operation of an air-conditioning plant for longer periods. The demand for heating is nevertheless significant, and the most efficient system to provide heating is undoubtedly the heat pump. No other technology can provide net primary energy savings, economic benefits to users and reduced climate impact at the same time.

As it is also able to provide a cooling effect, it is theorised that heat pumps are expected to become a more common solution for year-round needs. When combined with heat recovery-capable buildings or industrial plants, it is expected that cooling and heating requirements can be met in an efficient, reliable, cost-effective, and environmentally friendly manner.

- Commission E1: Air Conditioning

"Commission E1: Air Conditioning" often collaborates with "Commission E2: Heat Pumps and Energy Recovery" as they have at least one common aspect, the compressor. Both Commissions frequently work with the same equipment, which is adapted according to the seasons, alternating between air conditioners and heat pumps.

The commission is involved in various aspects of air conditioning, from equipment to systems. In recent years, it has developed a particular focus on energy saving and sustainability, whilst maintaining good conditions of thermal comfort, ranging from topics such as free cooling, solar cooling or long-term energy storage. The general importance of the themes addressed by the Commission results in relevant International Conferences.

Commission members work on new refrigerants in air conditioning systems, annual comparative studies of renewable energy systems, part-load operation of air conditioning systems, and related research fields.

- Commission E2: Heat Pumps and Energy Recovery

Commission members are proposed by member countries, then appointed by the STC following proposals from the Presidents of commissions. These commission members comprise industry, university, and research centre specialists or refrigeration practitioners.

The aim of "Commission E2: Heat Pumps and Energy Recovery" is to promote and enhance scientific and technological knowledge in heat pump and energy recovery fields, thanks to various activities such as the organisation or co-sponsoring of international conferences, or the publication of books and Informatory Notes.

== Activities and services ==
=== FRIDOC database ===
FRIDOC is the most comprehensive database in the world dedicated to refrigeration. It contains over 110,000 references to documents in all domains of refrigeration.

A large number of the documents referenced in FRIDOC are scientific and technical. FRIDOC also contains many review articles, documents on economic data and statistics, articles dealing with regulations and standardisation, etc.

==== Publications ====
The IIR has over 200 publications available on refrigeration technologies and applications: reference documents, guides, technical books, conference and congress papers and proceedings, tables and diagrams comprising the thermophysical properties of refrigerants.

Books in the refrigeration field published by other publishers are also available for purchase.

==== International Journal of Refrigeration ====
The Institute produces a monthly International Journal of Refrigeration that is published by Elsevier.

The International Journal of Refrigeration is the reference journal in the refrigeration field. It is practical for all those wanting to keep abreast of research and industrial news in all fields of refrigeration, including air-conditioning, heat-pump, refrigerated storage and transport.

==== Newsletter ====
The IIR produces an electronic monthly newsletter that features news and updates on the refrigeration sector: regulation, events, economic data, monitoring, technological progress, etc.

It provides a detailed overview of the general developments within the sector worldwide and as acts a regular information tool for readers.

=== Conferences and congresses ===
The IIR holds international conferences and congresses on key themes which include:

- natural refrigerants
- the cold chain
- magnetic refrigeration
- cryogenics
- compressors
- phase-change materials and slurries
- thermophysical properties and transfer processes of refrigerants
- new technologies

==== International Congress of Refrigeration ====
First held in 1908, the International Congress of Refrigeration of the IIR is a flagship event that converges industry and research. Covering all fields of refrigeration, the Congress, which takes place every four years, reunites key international stakeholders and provides perspectives on the future of the industry in line with sustainable development.

=== Professional directories ===
The IIR publishes two professional directories: a Laboratory Directory, which lists more than 300 laboratories in 55 countries; an Expertise Directory, which lists over 300 international experts in the refrigeration sector.

=== Working groups ===
IIR's working groups operate on a temporary basis, bringing together specialists to work on projects arising from current issues.

Their aim is to promote development, provide knowledge and give recommendations in these spheres. In order to achieve these objectives, they hold conferences and workshops, write publications and provide recommendations. Members of WGs are IIR members from industry, academia, national administrations and research.

== Research projects ==
=== ENOUGH ===
Funded by: Horizon 2020 (European Commission) and European Green Deal

Duration: 4 years (October 2021-September 2025)

Objective: The main scope of the project is to support the EU farm-to-fork sustainable strategy by providing technical, financial, and political tools and solutions to reduce GHG emissions (by 2030) and achieve carbon neutrality (by 2050) in the food industry.

=== SophiA ===
Funded by the European Commission- Horizon 2020 and European Green Deal

Duration: 4 years (October 2021-September 2025)

Objective: SophiA enables African countries to pursue sustainable pathways of development through a low-carbon, climate-resilient and green growth trajectory, leapfrogging fossil fuels and high global warming potential refrigerant technologies.

== Network ==
Today, the IIR has 59 member countries representing over two-thirds of the global population.

According to their annual financial contributions to the IIR, these member countries are divided into six categories, and this determines the services they receive and their level of voting power within the IIR. Member countries take part in IIR activities via their delegates and their nominated commission members. The delegates and commission members determine IIR priorities and take part in the IIR scientific activities and working groups, and develop recommendations. Member countries are entitled to host several IIR conferences and meetings per year.

=== Member countries ===
The following countries are members of the IIR:

Algeria	Australia	Austria	Belgium	Benin	Bulgaria
Burkina Faso	Cameroon	Canada	Chad	China	Congo Republic
Croatia	Cuba	Czech Republic	Egypt	Finland	France
Gabon	Germany	Guinea	Hungary	India	Ireland
Israel	Italy	Ivory Coast	Japan	Jordan	Lebanon
Madagascar	Malaysia	Mali	Morocco	Netherlands	New Zealand
Niger	North Macedonia	Norway	Poland	Qatar	Romania
Russia	Saudi Arabia	Serbia	Slovak Republic	Slovenia	South Korea
Spain	Sudan	Sweden	Togo	Tunisia	Turkey
United Arab Emirates	United Kingdom	United States	Uzbekistan	Vietnam	

IIR Member Countries

=== Benefactor and corporate members ===
Benefactor and corporate members can be companies, universities, national, regional or international organisations, laboratories, associations or any other structure active in or connected to the refrigeration industry or IIR activities.

=== Private members ===
Private members include individuals such as researchers, scientists, industrial practitioners, journalists or professors with extensive expertise, passion or active in fields related to the refrigeration sector.
