= International Rice Commission =

Intergovernmental organisation

The International Rice Commission (IRC) is an intergovernmental organisation of states that produce rice. It is a subsidiary organisation of the Food and Agriculture Organization (FAO). The IRC promotes international co-operation in the production, conservation, distribution, and consumption of rice.

The establishment of the IRC was proposed in May 1948 by the delegates of a FAO meeting on rice in the Philippines. In April 1948, the FAO Council followed up on this recommendation by producing a multilateral treaty known as the Constitution of the International Rice Commission. The Constitution entered into force on 4 January 1949 and the first session of the IRC was held in Bangkok later that year. The 12 founding members were Burma, Ecuador, Egypt, France, India, Italy, Mexico, Netherlands, Pakistan, Philippines, Sri Lanka and Thailand. The IRC meets in regular session at least once every four years.

The IRC is open to all members and associate members of the FAO. As of 2013, the IRC has 62 member states representing over 98 per cent of global rice production:

- Australia
- Bangladesh
- Benin
- Brazil
- Burkina Faso
- Cambodia
- Cameroon
- Chad
- China
- Colombia
- Democratic Republic of the Congo
- Cuba
- Dominican Republic
- Ecuador
- Egypt
- France
- Gambia
- Ghana
- Greece
- Guatemala
- Guinea
- Guyana
- Haiti
- Hungary
- India
- Indonesia
- Iran
- Italy
- Japan
- Kenya
- Korea, South
- Laos
- Liberia
- Madagascar
- Malaysia
- Mali
- Mauritania
- Mexico
- Mozambique
- Myanmar
- Nepal
- Netherlands
- Nicaragua
- Nigeria
- Pakistan
- Panama
- Paraguay
- Peru
- Philippines
- Portugal
- Rwanda
- Senegal
- Sierra Leone
- Sri Lanka
- Suriname
- Thailand
- Turkey
- United Kingdom
- United States
- Uruguay
- Venezuela
- Vietnam
