= List of Australian multilateral treaties (1975–present) =

This is a list of multilateral treaties entered into by Australia from the year 1975.

== 1975–1979 multilateral treaties ==
- 1975 – Exchange of Notes constituting an Agreement between the Government of Australia and the Government of the United States of America further amending the Agreement relating to the Establishment of a United States Naval Communication Station in Australia of 9 May 1963 (NW Cape)
- 1975 – Convention on International Liability for Damage Caused by Space Objects (London, Moscow, Washington, 29 March 1972)
- 1975 – International Convention on the Simplification and Harmonization of Customs Procedures
- 1975 – Convention on the Political Rights of Women
- 1975 – Protocol relating to Refugee Seamen
- 1975 – Amendments to Articles 24 and 25 of the Constitution of the World Health Organization of 22 July 1946
- 1975 – International Telecommunication Convention, Final Protocol, Additional Protocols I-VI, and Optional Additional Protocol
- 1975 – Convention on the Recognition and Enforcement of Foreign Arbitral Awards
- 1975 – Protocol for the Accession of the People's Republic of Bangladesh to the General Agreement on Tariffs and Trade of 30 October 1947
- 1975 – ILO Convention (No. 137) concerning the Social Repercussions of New Methods of Cargo Handling in Docks
- 1975 – Statutes of the International Centre for the Study of the Preservation and Restoration of Cultural Property of 5 December 1956, as amended 24 April 1963 and 12 April 1973
- 1975 – Protocols for the Further Extension of the Wheat Trade Convention and Food Aid Convention constituting the International Wheat Agreement of 20 February 1971
- 1975 – Protocol amending the Single Convention on Narcotic Drugs of 30 March 1961
- 1975 – Protocol for the Continuation in Force of the International Coffee Agreement of 18 March 1968, as extended
- 1975 – Agreement establishing the Association of Iron Ore Exporting Countries [APEF]
- 1975 – Agreement establishing the International Bauxite Association [IBA]
- 1975 – International Convention on the Elimination of all Forms of Racial Discrimination
- 1975 – Strasbourg Agreement Concerning the International Patent Classification
- 1975 – An Agreement to Establish the Intergovernmental Council of Copper Exporting Countries (CIPEC), as amended June 1974
- 1975 – Agreement on Implementation of Article VI of the General Agreement on Tariffs and Trade of 30 October 1947 [Anti-Dumping Code]
- 1975 – ILO Convention (No. 100) concerning Equal Remuneration for Men and Women Workers for Work of Equal Value
- 1975 – Convention on the Reduction of Statelessness
- 1975 – Convention for the Protection of the World Cultural and Natural Heritage
- 1975 – Convention on Wetlands of International Importance especially as Waterfowl Habitat
- 1975 – General Act of Arbitration for the Pacific Settlement of International Disputes
- 1975 – Statute of the International Court of Justice
- 1975 – Protocol relating to an Amendment to Article 48(a) of the Convention on International Civil Aviation of 7 December 1944
- 1975 – Amendments to the Convention of the World Meteorological Organization of 11 October 1947 (Geneva, 20 May 1975)
- 1975 – Amendments to Articles V and VI of the Constitution of the Food and Agriculture Organization of the United Nations of 16 October 1945 (Rome, 26 November 1975)
- 1975 – Amendments to the Schedule to the International Convention for the Regulation of Whaling of 2 December 1946 (London, 27 June 1975)
- 1976 – Annex E.4. (concerning drawback) to the International Convention on the Simplification and Harmonization of Customs Procedures of 18 May 1973
- 1976 – International Covenant on Economic, Social and Cultural Rights
- 1976 – Supplementary Agreement, 1976, to Second Nam Ngum Development Fund Agreement of 26 June 1974
- 1976 – Customs Convention on Containers, 1972, and Protocol of Signature
- 1976 – ILO Convention (No. 81) concerning Labour Inspection in Industry and Commerce
- 1976 – Protocols for the Third Extension of the Wheat Trade Convention and Food Aid Convention constituting the International Wheat Agreement, 1971
- 1976 – Agreement for the Establishment of a Regional Animal Production and Health Commission for Asia, the Far East and the South-West Pacific
- 1976 – Exchange of Letters constituting an Agreement between the Government of Australia and the Asian Development Bank concerning an Australian Contribution to the Technical Assistance Special Fund
- 1976 – Fifth International Tin Agreement
- 1976 – International Cocoa Agreement, 1975
- 1976 – International Coffee Agreement 1976
- 1976 – Convention on International Trade in Endangered Species of Wild Fauna and Flora [CITES]
- 1976 – Extension of the International Sugar Agreement of 13 October 1973
- 1976 – Amendments to Article V of the Constitution of the United Nations Educational, Scientific and Cultural Organization of 16 November 1945 (Nairobi, 8 November 1976)
- 1976 – Amendments to the Schedule to the International Convention for the Regulation of Whaling of 2 December 1946 (Cambridge, 25 June 1976)
- 1977 – Amendments to Articles 5, 11 and 16 of the Statute of the International Institute for the Unification of Private Law (UNIDROIT) of 15 March 1940
- 1977 – Universal Postal Union: Second Additional Protocol to the Constitution of 10 July 1964; General Regulations, and Final Protocol; Universal Postal Convention, Final Protocol, and Detailed Regulations; Postal Parcels Agreement, Final Protocol, and Detailed Regulations
- 1977 – Amendments to Articles 34 and 55 of the Constitution of the World Health Organization of 22 July 1946
- 1977 – Exchange of Letters constituting an Agreement between the Government of Australia and the Asian Development Bank concerning the Transfer to the Asian Development Fund of Australia's Contribution to the Multi-Purpose Special Fund
- 1977 – Asian-Oceanic Postal Convention, Final Protocol, and Detailed Regulations
- 1977 – Convention on the Prevention and Punishment of Crimes against Internationally Protected Persons, including Diplomatic Agents
- 1977 – Convention on the Prohibition of the Development, Production and Stockpiling of Bacteriological (Biological) and Toxin Weapons and on their Destruction
- 1977 – Regional Co-operative Agreement for Research, Development and Training related to Nuclear Science and Technology
- 1977 – Agreement establishing the International Fund for Agricultural Development
- 1977 – Further Extension of the International Sugar Agreement of 13 October 1973
- 1977 – Amendments to Articles 29 and 30 of the Agreement establishing the Association of Iron Ore Exporting Countries of 3 April 1975
- 1977 – Exchange of Letters constituting an Agreement between the Director-General of the General Agreement on Tariffs and Trade [acting in the name of the Contracting Parties] and the Swiss Federal Authorities relating to the Application to the GATT, by analogy, of the Agreement on Privileges and Immunities of the United Nations concluded between the Secretary-General of the United Nations and the Swiss Federal Council of 19 April 1946
- 1977 – Amendments to the Agreement for the Establishment of the Indo-Pacific Fisheries Council of 26 February 1948 Title revised to: Agreement establishing the Indo-Pacific Fishery Commission (IPFC) (11 November 1977)
- 1977 – Amendment to Article V of the Constitution of the Food and Agriculture Organization of the United Nations of 16 October 1945 (Rome, 22 November 1977)
- 1977 – Amendments to the Schedule to the International Convention for the Regulation of Whaling of 2 December 1946 (Canberra, 24 June 1977)
- 1978 – Universal Copyright Convention, as revised, and Protocols 1 and 2
- 1978 – Berne Convention for the Protection of Literary and Artistic Works of 9 September 1886, as revised
- 1978 – Amendments to the International Convention for the Prevention of Pollution of the Sea by Oil of 12 May 1954
- 1978 – International Sugar Agreement, 1977
- 1978 – Second Amendment to the Articles of Agreement of the International Monetary Fund of 27 December 1945
- 1978 – Exchange of Letters constituting an Agreement between the Government of Australia and the Asian Development Bank concerning an Australian Contribution to the Technical Assistance Special Fund
- 1978 – 1978 Protocols for the Fourth Extension of the Wheat Trade Convention and Food Aid Convention constituting the International Wheat Agreement, 1971
- 1978 – Agreement for the Establishment in Paris of an International Wine Office, and Protocol of Signature
- 1978 – Declaration on the Provisional Accession of Colombia to the General Agreement on Tariffs and Trade of 30 October 1947
- 1978 – Amendments to the Agreement for the Establishment of a Regional Animal Production and Health Commission for Asia, the Far East and the South-West Pacific of 22 June 1973 (Rome, 5 December 1978)
- 1978 – Amendments to the Schedule to the International Convention for the Regulation of Whaling of 2 December 1946 (Tokyo, 7 December 1977)
- 1979 – Nice Agreement concerning the International Classification of Goods and Services for the Purposes of the Registration of Marks of 15 June 1957, as revised at Stockholm on 14 July 1967 and at Geneva on 13 May 1977
- 1979 – Constitution of the Asia-Pacific Telecommunity
- 1979 – Agreement between the Government of Australia and the Government of the Republic of Korea concerning Cooperation in Peaceful Uses of Nuclear Energy and the Transfer of Nuclear Material
- 1979 – Agreement on an International Energy Program, as amended 5 February 1975 and by subsequent Governing Board decisions to May 1979
- 1979 – Convention and Operating Agreement on the International Maritime Satellite Organization (INMARSAT)
- 1979 – Agreement between the Government of Australia and the Government of the United Kingdom of Great Britain and Northern Ireland concerning Nuclear Transfers between Australia and the United Kingdom
- 1979 – Convention and Operating Agreement on the International Maritime Satellite Organization (INMARSAT)
- 1979 – Agreement between the Government of Australia and the Government of the United Kingdom of Great Britain and Northern Ireland concerning Nuclear Transfers between Australia and the United Kingdom
- 1979 – Agreement on Fisheries between the Government of Australia and the Government of Japan
- 1979 – 1979 Protocols for the Fifth Extension of the Wheat Trade Convention and Food Aid Convention constituting the International Wheat Agreement, 1971
- 1979 – Agreement on the Precipitation Enhancement Project (PEP) between the World Meteorological Organization, the Government of Spain and other Member States of the World Meteorological Organization participating in the Experiment
- 1979 – World Tourism Organization (WTO) Statutes
- 1979 – South Pacific Forum Fisheries Agency Convention
- 1979 – Exchange of Letters constituting an Agreement between the Government of Australia and the Asian Development Bank relating to a Further Contribution by the Government of Australia to the Technical Assistance Special Fund
- 1979 – Amendments to the Agreement for the Establishment of a Regional Animal Production and Health Commission for Asia, the Far East and the South-West Pacific of 22 June 1973 (Rome, 8 November 1979)
- 1979 – [Further amendments to the] Statutes of the International Centre for the Study of the Preservation and Restoration of Cultural Property of 5 December 1956, as amended 24 April 1963 and 12 April 1973 (23 April 1979)
- 1979 – Amendment to Article IV of the Constitution of the Food and Agriculture Organization of the United Nations of 16 October 1945 (27 November 1979)
- 1979 – Amendments to the Schedule to the International Convention for the Regulation of Whaling of 2 December 1946 (Tokyo, 20 December 1978)

== 1980–1989 multilateral treaties ==
- 1980 – Arrangement regarding Bovine Meat
- 1980 – Agreement between the Government of Australia and the Government of the Republic of Finland concerning the Transfer of Nuclear Material between Australia and Finland
- 1980 – Convention on the International Regulations for Preventing Collisions at Sea, 1972
- 1980 – Patent Cooperation Treaty
- 1980 – Convention (No. 144) concerning Tripartite Consultations to Promote the Implementation of International Labour Standards
- 1980 – International Dairy Arrangement
- 1980 – Cultural Agreement between the Government of Australia and the Government of the Republic of the Philippines
- 1980 – Agreement on Import Licensing Procedures
- 1980 – Agreement between the Patent Office of the Government of Australia and the International Bureau of the World Intellectual Property Organization in relation to the establishment and functioning of the Patent Office of the Government of Australia as an International Searching and International Preliminary Examining Authority under the Patent Cooperation Treaty
- 1980 – Protocol Supplementary to the Geneva (1979) Protocol to the General Agreement on Tariffs and Trade
- 1980 – Annex F.5. (concerning urgent consignments) to the International Convention on the Simplification and Harmonization of Customs Procedures of 18 May 1973
- 1980 – Agreement amending the Agreement establishing the South Pacific Commission of 6 February 1947
- 1980 – International Covenant on Civil and Political Rights
- 1980 – Protocol to amend the Convention relating to International Exhibitions of 22 November 1928
- 1980 – Food Aid Convention, 1980
- 1980 – International Natural Rubber Agreement, 1979
- 1980 – Agreement concerning the Voluntary Contributions to be given for the Execution of the Project to Preserve and Develop the Monumental Site of Moenjodaro
- 1980 – Protocol relating to an Amendment to Article 50(a) of the Convention on International Civil Aviation of 7 December 1944
- 1980 – Amendments to the Regulations under the Patent Co-operation Treaty (PCT) of 19 June 1970 (16 June 1980)
- 1980 – Amendment to Article V of the Constitution of the United Nations Educational, Scientific and Cultural Organization of 16 November 1945 (Belgrade, 4 October 1980)
- 1980 – Amendments to the Schedule to the International Convention for the Regulation of Whaling of 2 December 1946 (Brighton, 26 July 1980)
- 1981 – International Convention relating to the Limitation of the Liability of Owners of Sea-Going Ships, and Protocol of Signature
- 1981 – International Convention for Safe Containers
- 1981 – 1981 Protocols for the Sixth Extension of the Wheat Trade Convention, 1971, and the First Extension of the Food Aid Convention, 1980, constituting the International Wheat Agreement, 1971
- 1981 – Universal Postal Union (XVIII Congress): General Regulations, and Final Protocol; Universal Postal Convention, Detailed Regulations and Final Protocol;
- 1981 – Agreement on Interpretation and Application of Articles VI, XVI and XXIII of the General Agreement on Tariffs and Trade of 30 October 1947 [Subsidies and Countervailing Duties Code] – Agreement on Interpretation and Application of Articles VI, XVI and XXIII of the General Agreement on Tariffs and Trade of 30 October 1947 (Subsidies and Countervailing Duties Code)
- 1982 – International Convention on the Simplification and Harmonization of Customs Procedures: Annex A.1. concerning Customs formalities prior to the lodgement of the Goods declaration, Annex A.2. concerning the temporary storage of goods
- 1982 – International Convention on the Simplification and Harmonization of Customs Procedures:International Convention on the Simplification and Harmonization of Customs Procedures: Annex C.1. concerning outright exportation, Annex F.4. concerning Customs formalities in respect of postal traffic
- 1982 – Agreement between the Governments of Australia, New Zealand and the United States of America in cooperation with the Committee for the Cooperation of Joint Prospecting for Mineral Resources in South Pacific Offshore Areas relating to the conduct of a Joint Programme of Marine Geoscientific Research and Mineral Resource Studies of the South Pacific Region
- 1982 – International Convention for the Suppression of Counterfeiting Currency, and Protocol
- 1982 – Convention on the Conservation of Antarctic Marine Living Resources
- 1982 – Convention on Psychotropic Substances
- 1982 – International Convention on Tonnage Measurement of Ships, 1969
- 1982 – Second Agreement to extend the Regional Co-Operative Agreement for Research, Development and Training related to Nuclear Science and Technology of 29 February 1972
- 1982 – Exchange of Letters constituting an Agreement concerning Australian Participation in the Multinational Force and Observers, and related documents
- 1982 – Agreement on Implementation of Article VI of the General Agreement on Tariffs and Trade
- 1982 – Amendments to the Title and Substantive Provisions of the Convention on the Inter-Governmental Maritime Consultative Organization of 6 March 1948
- 1982 – Agreement between the Government of Australia and the Government of the Republic of the Philippines concerning Co-operation in Peaceful Uses of Nuclear Energy and the Transfer of Nuclear Material
- 1982 – Agreement between the Government of Australia and the European Atomic Energy Community concerning Transfers of Nuclear Material from Australia to the European Atomic Energy Community
- 1982 – Sixth International Tin Agreement
- 1982 – South Pacific Regional Trade and Economic Cooperation Agreement [SPARTECA]
- 1982 – Agreement on Implementation of Article VII of the General Agreement on Tariffs and Trade of 30 October 1947
- 1982 – Amendments to Article 7 of the Strasbourg Agreement concerning International Patent Classification of 24 March 1971
- 1982 – Amendments to Article 5 of the Stockholm Act of 14 July 1967 and the Geneva Act of 13 May 1977 of the Nice Agreement concerning the International Classification of Goods and Services for the Purposes of the Registration of Marks
- 1983 – Agreement on Maritime Delimitation between the Government of Australia and the Government of the French Republic
- 1983 – Agreement between the Government of Australia and the Organisation for Economic Co-operation and Development on Privileges and Immunities of the Organisation in Australia, and Exchange of Notes
- 1983 – 1983 Protocols for the Further Extension of the Wheat Trade Convention, 1971 and the Food Aid Convention, 1980, constituting the International Wheat Agreement, 1971
- 1983 – Convention on the Elimination of All Forms of Discrimination against Women (New York, 18 December 1979)
- 1983 – Interim Agreement between the Government of Australia and the Commission for the Conservation of Antarctic Marine Living Resources concerning Certain Privileges and Immunities of the Commission
- 1983 – Asian-Pacific Postal Convention, and Final Protocol
- 1983 – Agreement Terminating the Commonwealth Telecommunications Organisation Financial Agreement of 30 March 1973
- 1983 – International Coffee Agreement, 1983
- 1983 – Charter of the Asian and Pacific Development Centre
- 1983 – International Convention for the Safety of Life at Sea, 1974
- 1983 – Exchange of Letters constituting an Agreement between the Government of Australia and the Multinational Force and Observers to amend the Agreement concerning Australian Participation in the Multinational Force and Obs
- 1983 – Protocol of 1978 relating to the International Convention for Safety of Life at Sea of 1 November 1974
- 1983 – Amendment to Article 5.2 of the Convention relating to International Exhibitions of 22 November 1928, as revised 30 November 1972
- 1983 – Extension of the International Coffee Agreement 1976 (Agreement of 3 December 1975)
- 1983 – Amendments to the Plant Protection Agreement for the South East Asia and Pacific Region of 27 February 1956
- 1983 – Amendments to Annexes 4 and 6 of the Customs Convention on Containers of 2 December 1972 (12 November 1981)
- 1983 – Amendments to the International Regulations for Preventing Collisions at Sea, 1972 [under the Convention on the International Regulations for Preventing Collisions at Sea of 20 October 1972] (London, 19 November 1981)
- 1984 – International Convention on Civil Liability for Oil Pollution Damage
- 1984 – International Convention Relating to Intervention on the High Seas in Cases of Oil Pollution Casualties
- 1984 – Protocol relating to Intervention on the High Seas in Cases of Pollution by Substances Other than Oil, 1973
- 1984 – Convention on Prohibitions or Restrictions on the Use of Certain Conventional Weapons which may be deemed to be Excessively Injurious or to have Indiscriminate Effects, and Protocols I, II and III
- 1984 – International Convention on Standards of Training, Certification and Watchkeeping for Seafarers, 1978
- 1984 – Exchange of Notes constituting an Agreement between the Patent Office of the Government of Australia and the International Bureau of the World Intellectual Property Organization [WIPO] to amend the Agreement of 29 February 1980 in relation to the Establishment and Functioning of the Patent Office of the Government of Australia as an International Searching and International Preliminary Examining Authority under the Patent Co-operation Treaty [of 19 June 1970]
- 1984 – Agreement establishing the Association of Tin Producing Countries
- 1984 – Amendments to Articles 24 and 25 of the Constitution of the World Health Organization of 22 July 1946
- 1984 – International Agreement on Jute and Jute Products, 1982
- 1984 – International Convention on the Simplification and Harmonization of Customs Procedures Annex D.1. (concerning rules of origin)
- 1984 – Exchange of Notes constituting an Agreement between the Government of Australia and the Commission for the Conservation of Antarctic Marine Living Resources to extend the Interim Agreement concerning Certain Privileges and Immunities of the Commission of 15 August 1983
- 1984 – International Convention on Simplification and Harmonization of Customs Procedures Annex E.1. (concerning Customs transit)
- 1984 – Convention for the Protection of Cultural Property in the Event of Armed Conflict
- 1984 – Convention on the Prohibition of Military or any other Hostile Use of Environmental Modification Techniques
- 1984 – International conventions|Protocol amending the International Convention relating to the Limitation of the Liability of Owners of Sea-Going Ships of 10 October 1957
- 1984 – Agreement between the Governments of Australia, New Zealand and the United States of America in cooperation with the Committee for the Coordination of Joint Prospecting for Mineral Resources in South Pacific Offshore Areas (CCOP/SOPAC) relating to the Conduct of a Joint Programme of Marine Geoscientific Research and Mineral Resource Studies of the South Pacific Region – Second Phase
- 1984 – Amendments to the Convention on the Inter-Governmental Maritime Consultative Organization of 6 March 1948 relating to the Institutionalization of the Committee on Technical Co-operation in the Convention
- 1984 – Statutes of the International Centre for the Registration of Serial Publications, as amended 12 October 1976
- 1984 – Amendments to Articles 17, 18, 20 and 51 of the convention on the International Maritime Organization of 6 March 1948
- 1984 – International Telecommunication Convention, Final Protocol, Additional Protocols I-VII, and Optional Additional Protocol
- 1984 – Amendments to Articles 6, 7 and 8 of the Convention establishing the World Intellectual Property Organization of 14 July 1967
- 1984 – Amendments to Articles 13 and 14 of the Stockholm Act of 14 July 1967 to the Paris Convention for the Protection of Industrial Property
- 1984 – Amendments to Articles 53 and 54 of the Patent Cooperation Treaty of 19 June 1970
- 1984 – Amendments to Articles 22 and 23 of the Paris Act of 14 July 1971 of the Berne Convention for the Protection of Literary and Artistic Works
- 1984 – Amendments to Chapter II-1 of the Protocol of 17 February 1978 relating to the International Convention for the Safety of Life at Sea of 1 November 1974 (London, 20 November 1981)
- 1985 – Convention concerning the International Exchange of Publications
- 1985 – Convention concerning the Exchange of Official Publications and Government Documents between States
- 1985 – International Convention on the Simplification and Harmonization of Customs Procedures Annex A.3. (concerning Customs formalities applicable to commercial means of transport)
- 1985 – International Sugar Agreement 1984
- 1985 – Convention on the Recovery Abroad of Maintenance
- 1985 – Second Agreement to Extend the Agreement establishing the Asian Regional Co-operative Project on Food Irradiation
- 1985 – International Convention on the Prevention of Marine Pollution by Dumping of Wastes and Other Matter
- 1985 – Constitution of the United Nations Industrial Development Organisation
- 1985 – Agreement establishing an International Foot and Mouth Disease Vaccine Bank
- 1985 – Convention on the Recognition of Divorces and Legal Separations
- 1985 – Regional Convention on the Recognition of Studies, Diplomas and Degrees in Higher Education in Asia and the Pacific
- 1985 – Amendment to Article 11.2(a) of the Constitution of the Asia-Pacific Telecommunity of 27 March 1976
- 1985 – Amendments to the Agreement establishing the South Pacific Bureau for Economic Co-operation of 17 April 1973
- 1985 – Amendment to Article IX.3 to the Agreement establishing the South Pacific Bureau for Economic Co-operation of 17 April 1973
- 1985 – Amendments to Annexes 1, 5, 6 and 7 of the Customs Convention on Containers of 2 December 1972 (18 June 1984)
- 1985 – Modifications to [Articles 22(2) and 39(1)(a) of] the Patent Co-operation Treaty (PCT) of 19 June 1970 (Geneva, 3 February 1984)
- 1985 – Amendment to [insertion of new Article 25bis into] the Customs Convention on the Temporary Importation of Private Road Vehicles of 4 June 1954 (New York, 23 July 1984)
- 1986 – ILO Convention (No. 142) concerning Vocational Guidance and Vocational Training in the Development of Human Resources
- 1986 – ILO Convention (No. 150) concerning Labour Administration: Role, Functions and Organisation
- 1986 – Convention on Registration of Objects Launched into Outer Space
- 1986 – Agreement on the Rescue of Astronauts, the Return of Astronauts and the Return of Objects Launched into Outer Space (London, Moscow and Washington, 22 April 1968)
- 1986 – Exchange of Letters constituting an Agreement between the Government of Australia and the Multinational Force and Observers (MFO) concerning the extension of Australian Participation in the MFO of 16 March 1982
- 1986 – Agreement on the Privileges and Immunities of the International Atomic Energy Agency
- 1986 – Agreement between the Government of Australia and the International Bank for Reconstruction and Development and the International Development Association for the Cofinancing of Development Projects
- 1986 – Convention on Facilitation of International Maritime Traffic
- 1986 – Agreement Governing the Activities of States on the Moon and other Celestial Bodies (New York, 18 December 1979)
- 1986 – Convention on the Recognition of Studies, Diplomas and Degrees concerning Higher Education in the States belonging to the Europe Region
- 1986 – Convention on the Conflicts of Laws relating to the Form of Testamentary Dispositions
- 1986 – Headquarters Agreement between the Government of Australia and the Commission for the Conservation of Antarctic Marine Living Resources
- 1986 – Memorandum of Understanding to confer upon the Committee for Co-ordination of Joint Prospecting for Mineral Resources in South Pacific Offshore Areas status as an Intergovernmental Organisation
- 1986 – Protocol to amend the Convention on Wetlands of International Importance especially as Waterfowl Habitat of 2 February 1971
- 1986 – International Convention on Maritime Search and Rescue, 1979
- 1986 – South Pacific Nuclear Free Zone Treaty (Rarotonga, 6 August 1985)
- 1986 – Amendments to Annex I [Regulations for the Prevention of Pollution by Oil] of the Protocol of 17 February 1978 relating to the International Convention for the Prevention of Pollution from Ships of 2 November 1973 (London, 7 September 1984)
- 1986 – Amendments to the Annex to the Convention on Facilitation of International Maritime Traffic of 9 April 1965, as amended (London, 5 March 1986)
- 1986 – Amendments to the Agreement for the Establishment of a Regional Animal Production and Health Commission for Asia, the Far East and the South-West Pacific of 22 June 1973 (Rome, 8 November 1979)
- 1987 – Convention on the Civil Aspects of International Child Abduction
- 1987 – International Convention on Mutual Administrative Assistance for the Prevention, Investigation and Repression of Customs Offences
- 1987 – Agreement between the Government of Australia, the Government of New Zealand and the Government of the United Kingdom of Great Britain and Northern Ireland to Terminate the Nauru Island Agreement of 2 July 1919
- 1987 – Budapest Treaty on the International Recognition of the Deposit of Microorganisms for the Purposes of Patent Procedure, as amended 26 September 1980
- 1987 – Convention for the Conservation of Antarctic Seals
- 1987 – Convention on Early Notification of Nuclear Accident
- 1987 – Convention on Assistance in the Case of a Nuclear Accident or Radiological Emergency
- 1987 – Convention on the Physical Protection of Nuclear Material
- 1987 – Agreement on CAB International
- 1987 – Amendment to Article XI.3(a) of the Convention on International Trade in Endangered Species of Wild Fauna and Flora of 3 March 1973
- 1987 – Exchange of Letters constituting an Agreement between the Government of Australia and the European Space Agency to amend the Agreement for a Co-operative Space Vehicle Tracking Program of 15 June 1979
- 1987 – Amendments to Annex II [Regulations for the Control of Pollution by Noxious Liquid Substances in Bulk] of the Protocol of 17 February 1978 relating to the International Convention for the Prevention of Pollution from Ships of 2 November 1973 [MARPOL 73/78] (London, 5 December 1985)
- 1987 – Amendment to Section 8(a) of Article 6 of the Agreement establishing the International Fund for Agricultural Development of 13 June 1976 (Rome, 11 December 1986)
- 1987 – Amendments to Articles V and XV of the Constitution of the United Nations Educational, Scientific and Cultural Organization of 16 November 1945 (Paris, 18 November 1987)
- 1987 – Amendments to the Schedule to the International Convention for the Regulation of Whaling of 2 December 1946 (Bournemouth, United Kingdom, 26 June 1987)
- 1988 – Second Geneva (1987) Protocol to the General Agreement on Tariffs and Trade
- 1988 – Acts of the Universal Postal Union
- 1988 – International Tropical Timber Agreement, 1983
- 1988 – International Sugar Agreement, 1987
- 1988 – ILO Convention (No. 160) concerning Labour Statistics
- 1988 – Regional Co-operative Agreement for Research, Development and Training related to Nuclear Science and Technology, 1987
- 1988 – Vienna Convention for the Protection of the Ozone Layer
- 1988 – Protocol of 1978 relating to the International Convention for the Prevention of Pollution from Ships of 2 November 1973, as amended
- 1988 – International Convention on the Harmonized Commodity Description and Coding System
- 1988 – United Nations Convention on Contracts for the International Sale of Goods
- 1988 – International Wheat Agreement 1986
- 1988 – Agreement between the Government of Australia and the World Intellectual Property Organization [WIPO] in relation to the functioning of the Patent Office of the Government of Australia as an International Searching and International Preliminary Examining Authority under the Patent Cooperation Treaty [of 11 June 1970]
- 1988 – Agreement concerning an International Trust Fund for Tuvalu
- 1988 – Convention on the Privileges and Immunities of the Specialized Agencies
- 1988 – Treaty on Fisheries between the Government of Certain Pacific Island States and the Government of the United States of America; and Agreed Statement on Observer Programme relating to the Treaty on Fisheries between the Government of Certain Pacific Island States and the Government of the United States of America. of 2 April 1987
- 1988 – Agreement among Pacific Island States concerning the Implementation and Administration of the Treaty on Fisheries between the Governments of Certain Pacific Island States and the Government of the United States of America of 2 April 1987
- 1988 – Amendments to Annex 6 of the Customs Convention on Containers of 2 December 1972 (8 November 1985)
- 1988 – Amendments to the Schedule to the International Convention for the Regulation of Whaling of 2 December 1946 (Auckland, New Zealand, 3 June 1988)
- 1989 – International Convention for the Protection of New Varieties of Plants
- 1989 – Agreement establishing the Common Fund for Commodities
- 1989 – Montreal Protocol on Substances that Deplete the Ozone Layer
- 1989 – Convention against Torture and other Cruel, Inhuman or Degrading Treatment or Punishment
- 1989 – Agreement between the Government of the United Kingdom of Great Britain and Northern Ireland and the Government of the German Democratic Republic concerning the Treatment of War Graves of Members of the Armed Forces of the United Kingdom of Great Britain and Northern Ireland in the German Democratic Republic
- 1989 – Agreement concerning the Mosul War Cemetery
- 1989 – Amendments to the Constitution of Intergovernmental Committee on European Migration of 19 October 1953 [Reconstituted as the International Organization for Migration]
- 1989 – Amendment to Article VI.A.1 of the Statute of the International Atomic Energy Agency of 26 October 1956, as amended
- 1989 – Amendments to the International Regulations for Preventing Collisions at Sea, 1972 [under the Convention on the International Regulations for Preventing Collisions at Sea of 20 October 1972] (London, 19 November 1987)
- 1989 – Amendments to the Annex to the Convention on Facilitation of International Maritime Traffic of 9 April 1965, as amended (London, 17 September 1987)
- 1989 – Amendments to Annex I [Regulations for the Prevention of Pollution by Oil] of the Protocol of 17 February 1978 relating to the International Convention for the Prevention of Pollution from Ships of 2 November 1973 (London, 1 December 1987)
- 1989 – Amendments to Chapter II-1 (concerning Passenger Ro-Ro Ferries) of the International Convention for the Safety of Life at Sea of 1 November 1974 (London, 21 April 1988)
- 1989 – Amendments to Articles IV, V, VI and IX of the Constitution of the United Nations Educational, Scientific and Cultural Organization of 16 November 1945 (Paris, 14 November 1989)
- 1989 – Amendments to the Annex to the Customs Convention on the A.T.A. Carnet for the Temporary Admission of Goods of 6 December 1961 (26 November 1987)
- 1989 – Amendments to the Schedule to the International Convention for the Regulation of Whaling of 2 December 1946 (San Diego, California, USA, 16 June 1989)

== 1990–1999 multilateral treaties ==
- 1990 – Convention on the Means of Prohibiting and Preventing the Illicit Import, Export and Transfer of Ownership of Cultural Property
- 1990 – Amendments to the Convention on the International Maritime Satellite Organization (INMARSAT) of 3 September 1976
- 1990 – Asian-Pacific Postal Union: Constitution; General Regulations; Convention and Final Protocol
- 1990 – Agreement to Provide for the Accession of the Government of Australia to the Memorandum of Understanding for the Cooperative Support of the NATO Seasparrow Surface Missile System of 20 May 1977
- 1990 – International Convention against the Taking of Hostages
- 1990 – Convention for the Protection of the Natural Resources and Environment of the South Pacific Region (SPREP)
- 1990 – Protocol concerning Co-operation in Combating Pollution Emergencies in the South Pacific Region [under SPREP]
- 1990 – Treaty between the Government of Australia and the Government of the United Kingdom of Great Britain and Northern Ireland concerning the Investigation of Drug Trafficking and Confiscation of the Proceeds of Drug Trafficking
- 1990 – Annex V [Regulations for the Prevention of Pollution by Garbage from Ships] to the Protocol of 1978 relating to the International Convention for the Prevention of Pollution from Ships of 2 November 1973 [MARPOL Protocol]
- 1990 – Agreement among the Governments of Australia, New Zealand and the United States of America concerning the Continuation of Marine Geoscientific Research and Mineral Resource Studies in the South Pacific Region [Tripartite Phase II Extended Agreement]
- 1990 – Protocol for the Suppression of Unlawful Acts of Violence at Airports Serving International Civil Aviation
- 1990 – Convention on Conservation of Nature in the South Pacific
- 1990 – Amendments to the Commonwealth Telecommunications Organisation Financial Agreement of 30 March 1983
- 1990 – Amendments to Article 1(c) and Annex 6 of the Customs Convention on Containers of 2 December 1972 (1 December 1988)
- 1990 – Amendments to Annex II [Regulations for the Control of Pollution by Noxious Liquid Substances in Bulk] of the Protocol of 17 February 1978 relating to the International Convention for the Prevention of Pollution from Ships of 2 November 1973 (London, 17 March 1989)
- 1990 – Amendments to the Annex to the Convention for the Conservation of Antarctic Seals of 1 June 1972 (London, 16 September 1988)
- 1990 – Amendments to Chapter II-1 of the International Convention for the Safety of Life at Sea of 1 November 1974 (London, 28 October 1988)
- 1990 – Amendments to the Schedule to the International Convention for the Regulation of Whaling of 2 December 1946 (Noordwijk, Netherlands, 6 July 1990)
- 1991 – Convention on the Rights of the Child
- 1991 – ILO Convention (No. 156) concerning Equal Opportunities and Equal Treatment for Men and Women Workers: Workers with Family Responsibilities
- 1991 – Agreement establishing the South Pacific Applied Geoscience Commission [SOPAC]
- 1991 – Treaty between Australia and the Republic of Indonesia on the Zone of Cooperation in an Area between the Indonesian Province of East Timor and Northern Australia [Timor Gap Treaty]
- 1991 – Convention on Limitation of Liability for Maritime Claims, 1976 (London, 19 November 1976)
- 1991 – Agreement establishing the European Bank for Reconstruction and Development [EBRD]
- 1991 – Convention on Celebration and Recognition of the Validity of Marriages
- 1991 – ILO Convention (No. 159) concerning Vocational Rehabilitation and Employment (Disabled Persons)
- 1991 – Second Optional Protocol to the International Covenant on Civil and Political Rights, Aiming at the Abolition of the Death Penalty
- 1991 – Protocol of Amendment to [Article 15.1 of] the International Convention on Mutual Administrative Assistance for the Prevention, Investigation and Repression of Customs Offences of 9 June 1977
- 1991 – Convention on the Settlement of Investment Disputes between States and Nationals of other States [ICSID]
- 1991 – Amendment to Article I(a) of the Plant Protection Agreement for the Asia and Pacific Region of 27 February 1956, as amended
- 1991 – Letter of Notification of Association [of Australia] with the International COSPAS-SARSAT Programme as a Ground Segment Provider
- 1991 – Protocol Additional to the Geneva Conventions of 12 August 1949, and relating to the Protection of Victims of International Armed Conflicts [Protocol I]
- 1991 – Protocol Additional to the Geneva Conventions of 12 August 1949, and relating to the Protection of Victims of Non-International Armed Conflicts [Protocol II]
- 1991 – Convention on the Conservation of Migratory Species of Wild Animals
- 1991 – [First] Optional Protocol To The International Covenant on Civil and Political Rights
- 1991 – Agreement on a Comprehensive Political Settlement of the Cambodia Conflict
- 1991 – International Agreement on Jute and Jute Products, 1989
- 1991 – Agreement between the Governments of Australia, the United Kingdom of Great Britain and Northern Ireland, Canada, New Zealand and India, and the Government of the Tunisian Republic concerning Commonwealth War Cemeteries, Graves and Memorials in Tunisia
- 1991 – Cooperation Agreement between the Government of Australia and the European Organization for Nuclear Research [CERN] concerning the further Development of Scientific and Technical Cooperation in the Research Projects of CERN
- 1991 – Revised Text of the International Plant Protection Convention of 6 December 1951
- 1991 – Amendments to Regulations 5 and 6 of Annex V (Regulations for the Prevention of Pollution by Garbage from Ships) to the Protocol of 17 February 1978 relating to the International Convention for the Prevention of Pollution from Ships of 2 November 1973 (London, 17 October 1989)
- 1991 – Amendment to the International Regulations for Preventing Collisions at Sea, 1972 [under the Convention on the International Regulations for Preventing Collisions at Sea of 20 October 1972] (London, 19 October 1989)
- 1991 – Amendments to Articles V and VII of the Constitution of the United Nations Educational, Scientific and Cultural Organization of 16 November 1945 (Paris, 24 October 1991)
- 1991 – Amendments to Articles II, XIV and XVIII [membership by regional economic integration organizations] of the Constitution of the Food and Agriculture Organization of the United Nations of 16 October 1945 (Rome, 18 November 1991)
- 1991 – Amendments to the Schedule to the International Convention for the Regulation of Whaling of 2 December 1946 (Reykjavik, Iceland, 31 May 1991)
- 1992 – Convention on the Law Applicable to Trusts and on their Recognition
- 1992 – Basel Convention on the Control of Transboundary Movements of Hazardous Wastes and their Disposal
- 1992 – Agreement on the Importation of Educational, Scientific and Cultural Materials (Florence Agreement)
- 1992 – Protocol to the Agreement on the Importation of Educational, Scientific and Cultural Materials of 22 November 1950
- 1992 – Agreement to provide for the Accession of the Government of Spain to the Memorandum of Understanding for the Cooperative Support of the NATO Seasparrow Surface Missile System
- 1992 – International Telecommunication Regulations
- 1992 – ILO Convention (No. 92) concerning Crew Accommodation on Board Ship
- 1992 – ILO Convention (No. 133) concerning Crew Accommodation on Board Ship (supplementary provisions)
- 1992 – Agreement to extend the Regional Co-operative Agreement for Research, Development and Training related to Nuclear Science and Technology of 2 February 1987
- 1992 – International Convention for the Protection of Performers, Producers of Phonograms and Broadcasting Organisations
- 1992 – Convention for the Prohibition of Fishing with Long Driftnets in the South Pacific
- 1992 – Amendment, and Adjustments, to the Montreal Protocol on Substances that Deplete the Ozone Layer of 16 September 1987
- 1992 – Convention on the Taking of Evidence Abroad in Civil or Commercial Matters
- 1992 – Amendments to the Protocol of 17 February 1978 relating to the International Convention for the Safety of Life at Sea of 1 November 1974 concerning Radiocommunications for the Global Maritime Distress and Safety System [GMDSS] (London, 10 November 1988)
- 1992 – Amendments to the Regulations under the Patent Co-operation Treaty (PCT) of 19 June 1970 (12 July 1991)
- 1992 – Amendments to the Regulations under the Patent Co-operation Treaty (PCT) of 19 June 1970 (Geneva, 29 September 1992)
- 1992 – Amendments to Chapter II-1 of the International Convention for the Safety of Life at Sea of 1 November 1974 (London, 25 May 1990)
- 1992 – Amendments to Chapters II-V and VII of the International Convention for the Safety of Life at Sea of 1 November 1974 (London, 11 April 1989)
- 1992 – Amendments to Chapters I, II-1 and III to V (Radiocommunications for the Global Maritime Distress and Safety System) of the International Convention for the Safety of Life at Sea of 1 November 1974 (London, 9 November 1988)
- 1992 – Amendments to the Schedule to the International Convention for the Regulation of Whaling of 2 December 1946 (Glasgow, UK, 3 July 1992)
- 1993 – Convention for the Mutual Recognition of Inspections in respect of the Manufacture of Pharmaceutical Products
- 1993 – ILO Convention (No. 58) fixing the Minimum Age for the Admission of Children to Employment at Sea (Revised 1936)
- 1993 – United Nations Convention Against Illicit Traffic in Narcotic Drugs and Psychotropic Substances
- 1993 – Exchange of Notes constituting an Agreement between the Government of Australia and the Multinational Force and Observers (MFO) concerning the Resumption of Australian Participation in the MFO
- 1993 – International Sugar Agreement, 1992
- 1993 – Convention for the Suppression of Unlawful Acts Against the Safety of Maritime Navigation
- 1993 – Protocol for the Suppression of Unlawful Acts against the Safety of Fixed Platforms Located on the Continental Shelf
- 1993 – Establishment Agreement for the Center for International Forestry Research
- 1993 – Third Amendment of the Articles of Agreement of the International Monetary Fund of 27 December 1945
- 1993 – Agreement establishing the South Pacific Forum Secretariat
- 1993 – Amendment to Article 6 (1) of the Statute of the International Institute for the Unification of Private Law (UNIDROIT) of 15 March 1940, as amended
- 1993 – Protocol (SDR Protocol) amending the International Convention for the Unification of Certain Rules of Law relating to Bills of Lading of 25 August 1924 (The Hague Rules), as amended by the Protocol of 23 February 1968 (Visby Rules)
- 1993 – Agreement between Australia and the Republic of Nauru for the Settlement of the Case in the International Court of Justice concerning Certain Phosphate Lands in Nauru
- 1993 – Exchange of Notes constituting an Implementing Arrangement, concerning International Obligation Exchanges, to the Agreement between the Government of Australia and the European Atomic Energy Community (EURATOM) concerning Transfers of Nuclear Material of 21 September 1981.
- 1993 – Niue Treaty on Cooperation in Fisheries Surveillance and Law Enforcement in the South Pacific Region
- 1993 – Convention on Biological Diversity
- 1993 – International Agreement on the Use of INMARSAT Ship Earth Stations within the Territorial Sea and Ports
- 1993 – Convention on Temporary Admission
- 1993 – Amendments to Annex I of the Protocol of 17 February 1978 relating to the International Convention for the Prevention of Pollution from Ships of 2 November 1973 [MARPOL 73/78] (London, 4 July 1991)
- 1993 – [Further amendments to the] Statutes of the International Centre for the Study of the Preservation and Restoration of Cultural Property of 5 December 1956, as amended 24 April 1963, 12 April 1973 and 23 April 1979 [ICCROM] (21 October 1993)
- 1993 – Amendments to Articles II and VII of the Articles of Agreement of the International Finance Corporation [IFC] of 25 May 1955 (28 December 1992)
- 1993 – Amendments to Articles IV and V of the Constitution of the United Nations Educational, Scientific and Cultural Organization of 16 November 1945 (Paris, 11 November 1993)
- 1993 – Amendments to the Appendix to the Anti-Doping Convention of 16 November 1989 (17 June 1993)
- 1994 – United Nations Framework Convention on Climate Change
- 1994 – ILO Convention (No. 135) concerning Protection and Facilities to be Afforded to Workers' Representatives in the Undertaking
- 1994 – ILO Convention (No. 158) concerning Termination of Employment at the Initiative of the Employer
- 1994 – Amendments to Articles 6 and 7 of the Convention on Wetlands of International Importance especially as Waterfowl Habitat, done at Ramsar on 2 February 1971, as amended
- 1994 – Convention for the Conservation of Southern Bluefin Tuna
- 1994 – Amendment, and Adjustments, to the Montreal Protocol on Substances that Deplete the Ozone Layer of 16 September 1987
- 1994 – Amendments to Articles 24 and 25 of the Constitution of the World Health Organization of 22 July 1946
- 1994 – Agreement relating to Scientific and Technical Co-operation between Australia and the European Community
- 1994 – Asian-Pacific Postal Convention and General Regulations
- 1994 – Agreement between the Government of Australia and the Government of the United Kingdom of Great Britain and Northern Ireland providing for the Reciprocal Recognition and Enforcement of Judgments in Civil and Commercial Matters
- 1994 – International Telecommunication Union (ITU): Constitution; Convention; Optional Protocol on the Compulsory Settlement of Disputes relating to the ITU Constitution, to the ITU Convention and the Administrative Regulations
- 1994 – Fourth Additional Protocol to the Constitution of the Universal Postal Union
- 1994 – Agreement between Papua New Guinea and Fiji, Tonga, Solomon Islands, Vanuatu, Australia and New Zealand, concerning the Status of Elements of the Defence Forces of those Countries Deployed in the North Solomons Province of Papua New Guinea as part of the South Pacific Peacekeeping Force
- 1994 – United Nations Convention on the Law of the Sea
- 1994 – Agreement relating to the Implementation of Part XI of the United Nations Convention on the Law of the Sea of 10 December 1982
- 1994 – Anti-Doping Convention
- 1994 – Agreement on the Establishment of the International Plant Genetic Resources Institute
- 1994 – Amendments to the International Code for the Construction and Equipment of Ships carrying Dangerous Chemicals in Bulk (IBC Code) [in accordance with the Protocol of 17 February 1978 relating to the International Convention for the Prevention of Pollution from Ships of 2 November 1973 [MARPOL 73/78 (London, 30 October 1992)]]
- 1994 – Amendments to the Code for the Construction and Equipment of Ships carrying Dangerous Chemicals in Bulk (BCH Code) [in accordance with the Protocol of 17 February 1978 relating to the International Convention for the Prevention of Pollution from Ships of 2 November 1973 [MARPOL 73/78] (London, 30 October 1992)]
- 1994 – Amendments to Annexes II-IV of the International Convention for the Safety of Life at Sea of 1 November 1974 (London, 11 December 1992)
- 1994 – Amendments to Chapter II-2 of the International Convention for the Safety of Life at Sea of 1 November 1974 (Fire Safety Measures for Existing Passenger Ships) (London, 10 April 1992)
- 1994 – Amendments to Chapter II-1 of the International Convention for the Safety of Life at Sea of 1 November 1974 (London, 10 April 1992)
- 1994 – Amendments to Chapters II-2, III and V-VII of the International Convention for the Safety of Life at Sea of 1 November 1974 (London, 23 May 1991)
- 1995 – International Convention on the Establishment of an International Fund for Compensation for Oil Pollution Damage
- 1995 – Protocol to the International Convention on the Establishment of an International Fund for Compensation for Oil Pollution Damage of 18 December 1971
- 1995 – Annex III to the Protocol of 17 February 1978 relating to the International Convention for the Prevention of Pollution from Ships of 2 November 1973 (MARPOL 73/78), as amended on 30 October 1992
- 1995 – Agreement to Ban Smoking on International Passenger Flights
- 1995 – Convention abolishing the Requirement of Legalisation for Foreign Public Documents
- 1995 – International Convention on Oil Pollution Preparedness, Response and Co-Operation, 1990
- 1995 – ILO Convention (No. 173) concerning the Protection of Workers' Claims in the Event of the Insolvency of their Employer
- 1995 – International Bovine Meat Agreement
- 1995 – International Grains Agreement, 1995
- 1995 – Agreement establishing the South Pacific Regional Environment Programme (SPREP) [as an intergovernmental organisation]
- 1995 – Agreement on the Establishment of the Korean Peninsula Energy Development Organization [KEDO]
- 1995 – Amendments to the International Regulations for Preventing Collisions at Sea, 1972 [under the Convention on the International Regulations for Preventing Collisions at Sea of 20 October 1972] (London, 4 November 1993)
- 1995 – Amendment to Article V of the Constitution of the United Nations Educational, Scientific and Cultural Organization of 16 November 1945 (Paris, 31 October 1995)
- 1995 – General Agreement on Tariffs and Trade 1947
- 1996 – International Maritime Organization Protocol of 1992 to amend the International Convention on Civil Liability for Oil Pollution Damage of 29 November 1969
- 1996 – International Maritime Organization Protocol of 1992 to amend the International Convention on the Establishment of an International Fund for Compensation for Oil Pollution Damage of 18 December 1971
- 1996 – International Labour Organization Convention (No. 69) concerning Certification of Ships' Cooks
- 1996 – International Labour Organization Convention (No. 73) concerning the Medical Examination of Seafarers
- 1996 – International Labour Organization Convention (No. 166) concerning the Repatriation of Seafarers (Revised), 1987
- 1996 – Instrument amending the Constitution of the International Telecommunication Union of 22 December 1992
- 1996 – Amendment to Article XVII of the Agreement relating to the International Telecommunications Satellite Organization (INTELSAT) of 20 August 1971
- 1996 – Second Protocol to the General Agreement on Trade in Services [GATS] of 15 April 1994
- 1996 – Third Protocol to the General Agreement on Trade in Services [GATS] of 15 April 1994
- 1996 – Agreement for the Establishment of the Indian Ocean Tuna Commission
- 1996 – Amendments to the Appendix to the Anti-Doping Convention of 16 November 1989 (31 May 1996)
- 1997 – International Tropical Timber Agreement, 1994
- 1997 – Convention on the Prohibition of the Development, Production, Stockpiling and Use of Chemical Weapons and on their Destruction
- 1997 – Convention on Nuclear Safety
- 1997 – Convention for the Pacific Settlement of International Disputes
- 1997 – Exchange of Notes constituting an Agreement between the Government of Australia and the Multinational Force and Observers (MFO) to further amend and extend the Agreement concerning Australian Participation in the MFO of 16–17 March 1982, as amended and extended on 4 January 1993
- 1997 – Agreement establishing the International Institute for Democracy and Electoral Assistance [International IDEA]
- 1997 – Convention on Laundering, Search, Seizure and Confiscation of the Proceeds from Crime
- 1997 – Annex B.1. concerning Goods for Display or Use at Exhibitions, Fairs, Meetings or Similar Events, to the Convention on Temporary Admission of 26 June 1990
- 1997 – Protocol Additional to the Agreement [of 10 July 1974] between Australia and the International Atomic Energy Agency for the Application of Safeguards in connection with the Treaty on the Non-Proliferation of Nuclear Weapons of 1 July 1968
- 1997 – Second Agreement to further extend the Regional Co-operative Agreement for Research, Development and Training related to Nuclear Science and Technology of 2 February 1987
- 1997 – Exchange of Notes constituting an Agreement between the Government of Australia and the Government of Japan concerning Cooperation on the Geostationary Meteorological Satellite-5 System
- 1997 – Seafarers' Training, Certification and Watchkeeping Code [STCW Code]
- 1997 – Amendment to Article V of the Constitution of the United Nations Educational, Scientific and Cultural Organization of 16 November 1945 (Paris, 11 November 1997)
- 1998 – International Convention on Salvage, 1989
- 1998 – Agreement between the Government of Australia and the International Bureau of the World Intellectual Property Organization [WIPO] in relation to the Functioning of the Australian Patent Office as an International Search
- 1998 – Protocol on Environmental Protection to the Antarctic Treaty of 1 December 1959
- 1998 – Additional Protocol [Protocol IV on Blinding Laser Weapons] to the Convention on Prohibitions or Restrictions on the Use of Certain Conventional Weapons Which May Be Deemed to Be Excessively Injurious or to Have Indiscriminate Effects of 10 October 1980 (Vienna, 13 October 1995)
- 1998 – Fourth Protocol to the General Agreement on Trade in Services of 15 April 1994
- 1998 – Montreal Protocol No. 4 to amend the Convention for the Unification of Certain Rules relating to International Carriage by Air, signed at Warsaw on 12 October 1929, as amended by the Protocol done at The Hague on 28 September 1955
- 1998 – Protocol concerning the Peace Monitoring Group made pursuant to [and amending] the Agreement between Australia, Papua New Guinea, Fiji, New Zealand and Vanuatu concerning the Neutral Truce Monitoring Group for Bougain
- 1998 – Amendments to the Convention on the International Maritime Satellite Organization (INMARSAT) of 3 September 1976
- 1998 – Protocol on Prohibitions or Restrictions on the Use of Mines, Booby-Traps and other Devices, as amended (Protocol II, as amended) annexed to the Convention on Prohibitions or Restrictions on the Use of Certain Conventional Weapons which may be Deemed to be Excessively Injurious or to have Indiscriminate Effects of 10 October 1980 (Geneva, 3 May 1996)
- 1998 – Agreement on the Network of Aquaculture Centres in Asia and the Pacific, as amended
- 1998 – Convention on Protection of Children and Co-operation in respect of Intercountry Adoption
- 1998 – Convention establishing the Multilateral Investment Guarantee Agency [MIGA]
- 1998 – Protocol relating to an Amendment to Article 3bis of the Convention on International Civil Aviation of 7 December 1944
- 1998 – Protocol [insertion of Article 83bis] to the Convention on International Civil Aviation of 7 December 1944
- 1998 – Amendments to the International Code for the Construction and Equipment of Ships carrying Dangerous Chemicals in Bulk (IBC Code, vague expressions) [in accordance with the Protocol of 17 February 1978 relating to the International Convention for the Prevention of Pollution from Ships of 2 November 1973 [MARPOL 73/78 (London, 10 March 1997)]]
- 1998 – Amendments to the International Code for the Construction and Equipment of Ships carrying Dangerous Chemicals in Bulk (IBC Code) [in accordance with the Protocol of 17 February 1978 relating to the International Convention for the Prevention of Pollution from Ships of 2 November 1973 [MARPOL 73/78 (London, 10 July 1996)]]
- 1998 – Amendments to the Code for the Construction and Equipment of Ships carrying Dangerous Chemicals in Bulk (BCH Code) [in accordance with the Protocol of 17 February 1978 relating to the International Convention for the Prevention of Pollution from Ships of 2 November 1973 [MARPOL 73/78 (London, 10 July 1996)]]
- 1998 – International Code for Application of Fire Test Procedures [under the auspices of the International Convention for the Safety of Life at Sea [SOLAS] of 1 November 1974] (London, 5 December 1996)
- 1998 – International Life-Saving Appliance (LSA) Code [under the auspices of the International Convention for the Safety of Life at Sea [SOLAS] of 1 November 1974] (London, 4 June 1996)
- 1998 – Amendments to the Appendix to the Anti-Doping Convention of 16 November 1989 (28 February 1998)
- 1999 – Agreement on Mutual Recognition in relation to Conformity Assessment, Certificates and Markings between Australia and the European Community
- 1999 – Convention on the Prohibition of the Use, Stockpiling, Production and Transfer of Anti-Personnel Mines and on their Destruction
- 1999 – Headquarters Agreement between the Government of Australia and the Commission for the Conservation of Southern Bluefin Tuna
- 1999 – Exchange of Notes constituting an Implementing Arrangement between the Government of Australia and the European Atomic Energy Community [EURATOM] concerning Plutonium Transfers under the Agreement between the Government of Australia and EURATOM concerning Transfers of Nuclear Material from Australia to EURATOM, and accompanying Side Letter No. 2, of 21 September 1981, and the Implementing Arrangement concerning Plutonium Transfers of 8 September 1993
- 1999 – Fifth Protocol to the General Agreement on Trade in Services of 15 April 1994
- 1999 – Amendment to the Montreal Protocol on Substances that Deplete the Ozone Layer of 16 September 1987 (Montreal, 17 September 1997)
- 1999 – Convention on Combating Bribery of Foreign Public Officials in International Business Transactions
- 1999 – Protocol relating to an amendment to [the final paragraph of] the Convention on International Civil Aviation of 7 December 1944
- 1999 – Food Aid Convention, 1999
- 1999 – Agreement amending [Article 4(2) of] the Agreement relating to Scientific and Technical Cooperation between Australia and the European Community of 23 February
- 1999 – Exchange of Notes constituting an Agreement between the Government of Australia and the Multinational Force and Observers (MFO) concerning Australian Participation in the MFO

== 2000–2009 multilateral treaties ==
- 2000 – Protocol of 1988 relating to the International Convention on Load Lines of 5 April 1966
- 2000 – Protocol of 1988 relating to the International Convention for the Safety of Life at Sea of 1 November 1974
- 2000 – International Convention for the Protection of New Varieties of Plants of 2 December 1961 [UPOV], as revised 10 November 1972, 23 October 1978 and 19 March 1991
- 2000 – Instrument amending the Constitution of the International Telecommunication Union of 22 December 1992, as amended 14 October 1994
- 2000 – Exchange of Notes constituting an Agreement between the Government of Australia and the United Nations Transitional Administration in East Timor (UNTAET) concerning the continued Operation of the Treaty between Australia and the Republic of Indonesia on the Zone of Cooperation in an Area between the Indonesian Province of East Timor and Northern Australia of 11 December 1989 (Dili, 10 February 2000)
- 2000 – Amendments to Articles 3.5 and 9.8 of the Constitution of the Asia-Pacific Telecommunity of 27 March 1976 (Colombo, 29 November 1991)
- 2000 – Agreement concerning the Adoption of Uniform Technical Prescriptions for Wheeled Vehicles, Equipment and Parts which can be Fitted and/or be Used on Wheeled Vehicles and the Conditions for Reciprocal Recognition of Approvals Granted on the Basis of these Prescriptions, as amended to 16 October 1995 (Geneva, 20 March 1958)
- 2000 – United Nations Convention to Combat Desertification in those Countries Experiencing Serious Drought and/or Desertification, particularly in Africa (Paris, 17 June 1994)
- 2000 – Agreement for the Establishment of the International Development Law Institute (IDLO) (Rome, 5 February 1988)
- 2000 – Amendments to the International Code for the Construction and Equipment of Ships carrying Dangerous Chemicals in Bulk (IBC Code) [in accordance with the Protocol of 17 February 1978 relating to the International Convention for the Prevention of Pollution from Ships of 2 November 1973 [MARPOL 73/78 (London, 16 March 1990)]]
- 2000 – Amendments to the Code for the Construction and Equipment of Ships carrying Dangerous Chemicals in Bulk (BCH Code) [in accordance with the Protocol of 17 February 1978 relating to the International Convention for the Prevention of Pollution from Ships of 2 November 1973 [MARPOL 73/78 (London, 16 March 1990)]]
- 2001 – Agreement for the Implementation of the Provisions of the United Nations Convention on the Law of the Sea of 10 December 1982 Relating to the Conservation and Management of Straddling Fish Stocks and Highly Migratory Fish Stocks (New York, 4 December 1995)
- 2001 – Agreement Recognising the International Legal Personality of the International Rice Research Institute (Manila: 19 May 1995)
- 2001 – Amended Convention on the International Mobile Satellite Organization (London 20 April 1998)
- 2001 – Convention on the Safety of United Nations and Associated Personnel (New York, 9 December 1994)
- 2001 – Convention to Ban the Importation into Forum Island Countries of Hazardous and Radioactive Wastes and to Control the Transboundary Movement and Management of Hazardous Wastes within the South Pacific Region (Waigani, PNG, 16 September 1995)
- 2001 – Protocol Relating to the Madrid Agreement Concerning the International Registration of Marks, 1891
- 2002 – Convention on the Recognition and Enforcement of Decisions relating to Maintenance Obligations (The Hague, 2 October 1973)
- 2002 – Declaration under the Statute of the International Court of Justice concerning Australia's Acceptance of the Jurisdiction of the International Court of Justice (Canberra, 21 March 2002)
- 2002 – Declaration under the United Nations Convention on the Law of the Sea concerning the application to Australia of the Dispute Settlement Provisions of that Convention (Canberra, 21 March 2002)
- 2002 – Final Protocol and Partial Revision of the 1998 Radio Regulations, as incorporated in the Final Acts of the World Radiocommunication Conference (WRC-2000) (Istanbul, 2 June 2000)
- 2002 – International Convention for the Suppression of Terrorist Bombings (New York, 15 December 1997)
- 2002 – International Convention for the Suppression of the Financing of Terrorism (New York, 9 December 1999)
- 2002 – Rome Statute of the International Criminal Court (Rome, 17 July 1998)
- 2002 – Agreement on the Privileges and Immunities of the International Tribunal for the Law of the Sea (New York, 23 May 1997)
- 2003 – Agreement Between Solomon Islands, Australia, New Zealand, Fiji, Papua New Guinea, Samoa and Tonga concerning the Operations and Status of the Police and Armed Forces and Other Personnel Deployed to Solomon Islands to Assist in the Restoration of Law and Order and Security (Townsville, 24 July 2003)
- 2003 – Amendments to Articles 16, 17 and 19(B) of the Convention on the International Maritime Organization of 6 March 1948 (London, 4 November 1993)
- 2003 – Amendments to the Schedule to the International Convention for the Regulation of Whaling (1946) (Shimonoseki, Japan, 24 May 2002; Cambridge, U.K., 14 October 2002)
- 2003 – Convention on Jurisdiction, Applicable Law, Recognition, Enforcement and Co-operation in Respect of Parental Responsibility and Measures for the Protection of Children (The Hague, 19 October 1996)
- 2003 – Convention on the Recognition of Qualifications concerning Higher Education in the European Union (Lisbon, 11 April 1997)
- 2003 – Convention on the Transfer of Sentenced Persons (Strasbourg, 21 March 1983)
- 2003 – Joint Convention on the Safety of Spent Fuel Management and on the Safety of Radioactive Waste Management (Vienna, 5 September 1997)
- 2003 – Protocol Concerning the Bougainville Transition Team Made pursuant to the Agreement, done at Port Moresby on 5 December 1997, Between Australia, Papua New Guinea, Fiji, New Zealand and Vanuatu Concerning the Neutral Truce Monitoring Group for Bougainville as amended by the Protocol, done at Port Moresby on 29 April 1998 (Sydney, 30 June 2003)
- 2003 – Protocol relating to an Amendment to Article 50(a) of the Convention on International Civil Aviation (Montreal, 26 October 1990)
- 2003 – Third Agreement to Extend the 1987 Regional Co-operative Agreement for Research, Development and Training related to Nuclear Science and Technology
- 2004 – Agreement establishing the International Organisation of Vine and Wine (Paris, 3 April 2001)
- 2004 – Agreement on the Conservation of Albatrosses and Petrels (Canberra, 19 June 2001)
- 2004 – Agreement to Promote Compliance with International Conservation and Management Measures by Fishing Vessels on the High Seas (Rome, 24 November 1993)
- 2004 – Amendment to the Limitation Amounts in the Protocol of 1992 to Amend the International Convention on Civil Liability for Oil Pollution Damage, 1969 (London, 18 October 2000)
- 2004 – Amendment to the Limits of Compensation in the Protocol of 1992 to Amend the International Convention on the Establishment of an International Fund for Compensation for Oil Pollution Damage, 1971 (London, 18 October 2000)
- 2004 – Amendments to Article I of the Convention on Prohibitions or Restrictions on the Use of Certain Conventional Weapons which May be Deemed to be Excessively Injurious or to have Indiscriminate Effects (CCW) (New York, 21 December 2001)
- 2004 – Amendments to the Agreement and Operating Agreement Relating to the International Telecommunications Satellite Organisation "Intelsat" of 20 August 1971 (Washington, 17 November 2000)
- 2004 – Amendments to the Annex to the International Convention for the Safety of Life at Sea (SOLAS), 1974 Contained in Resolutions 1, 2, 6 and 7 of the Conference of Contracting Governments and Including the International Ship and Port Facility Security (ISPS) Code (London, 12 December 2002)
- 2004 – Convention on the Conservation of Highly Migratory Fish Stocks in the Western and Central Pacific Ocean (Honolulu. 5 September 2000)
- 2004 – International Convention for the Prevention of Pollution from Ships, 1973, as Modified by the Protocol of 1978 Relating thereto Optional Annex IV (London, 13 March 2000)
- 2004 – Pacific Agreement on Closer Economic Relations (PACER) (Nauru, 18 August 2001)
- 2004 – Protocol Against the Smuggling of Migrants by Land, Sea and Air, Supplementing the United Nations Convention Against Transnational Organised Crime (New York, 15 November 2000)
- 2004 – Protocol of 1996 to Amend the Convention on Limitation of Liability for Maritime Claims of 19 November 1976 (London, 2 May 1996)
- 2004 – Rotterdam Convention on the Prior Informed Consent Procedure for Certain Hazardous Chemicals and Pesticides in International Trade (Rotterdam, 10 September 1998)
- 2004 – Stockholm Convention on Persistent Organic Pollutants (Stockholm, 22 May 2001)
- 2004 – United Nations Convention Against Transnational Organized Crime (New York, 15 November 2000)
- 2005 – Additional Protocol to the General Regulations of the Asian-Pacific Postal Union Tehran, 18 September 2000
- 2005 – Agreement on Mutual Acceptance of Oenological Practices (Toronto, 18 December 2001)
- 2005 – Amendment to the Montreal Protocol on Substances that Deplete the Ozone Layer of 16 September 1987 (Beijing, 3 December 1999)
- 2005 – Amendments to Annex III to the Rotterdam Convention on the Prior Informed Consent Procedure for Certain Hazardous Chemicals and Pesticides in International Trade, done at Rotterdam on 10 September 1998 (Geneva, 24 September 2004)
- 2005 – Amendments to Annexes VIII and IX of the Basel Convention on the Control of Transboundary Movements of Hazardous Wastes and their Disposal, 1992 (Geneva, 29 October 2004)
- 2005 – Amendments to Articles 24 and 25 of the Constitution of the World Health Organization (Geneva, 16 May 1998)
- 2005 – Fifth Additional Protocol to the Convention of the Universal Postal Union of 10 July 1964 (Seoul, 14 September 1994)
- 2005 – ILO Convention (No. 155) concerning Occupational Safety and Health and the Working Environment (Geneva, 22 June 1981)
- 2005 – Instruments Amending the Constitution and the Convention of the International Telecommunications Union (Geneva, 1992) as amended by the Plenipotentiary Conference (Kyoto, 1994) and by the Plenipotentiary Conference (Minneapolis, 1998) (Marrakesh, 18 October 2002)
- 2005 – New [Second] Revised Text of the International Plant Protection Convention of 6 December 1951, as revised 28 November 1979 (Rome, 17 November 1997)
- 2005 – Protocol relating to an Amendment to Article 56 of the Convention on International Civil Aviation (Montreal, 6 October 1989)
- 2005 – Protocol to Prevent, Suppress and Punish Trafficking in Persons, Especially Women and Children, supplementing the United Nations Convention against Transnational Organized Crime (New York, 15 November 2000)
- 2005 – Second Additional Protocol to the Constitution of the Asian-Pacific Postal Union Teheran, 18 September 2000
- 2005 – Sixth Additional Protocol to the Constitution of the Universal Postal Union of 10 July 1964 (Seoul, 14 September 1999)
- 2005 – Treaty of Amity and Cooperation in Southeast Asia (Denpasar, 24 February 1976); Protocol Amending the Treaty of Amity and Cooperation in Southeast Asia (Manila, 15 December 1987); Second Protocol Amending the Treaty of Amity and Cooperation in Southeast Asia (Manila, 25 July 1998)
- 2005 – WHO Framework Convention on Tobacco Control (Geneva, 21 May 2003)
- 2006 – 1996 Protocol to the Convention on the Prevention of Marine Pollution by Dumping of Wastes and Other Matter of 29 December 1972 (London, 7 November 1996)
- 2006 – Agreement Establishing the Pacific Islands Forum Secretariat (Tarawa, 30 October 2000)
- 2006 – Agreement for Establishment of the Global Crop Diversity Trust (Rome, 1 April 2004)
- 2006 – International Telecommunication Union, World Radiocommunication Conference (WRC-03), Incorporating partial revision of the Radio Regulations of 5 December 1979 (Geneva, 4 July 2003)
- 2006 – International Treaty on Plant Genetic Resources For Food and Agriculture (Rome, 3 November 2001)
- 2006 – Optional Protocol to the Convention on the Rights of the Child Involvement of Children in Armed Conflict (New York, 25 May 2000)
- 2006 – Protocol of Amendment to the International Convention on the Simplification and Harmonization of Customs Procedures (Brussels, 26 June 1999)
- 2006 – To the Rotterdam Convention on the Prior Informed Consent Procedure For Certain Hazardous Chemicals and Pesticides In International Trade, Done At Rotterdam on 10 September 1998 (Geneva, 24 September 2004)
- 2007 – 2007 Amendments to Appendices I and II of the Convention on International Trade in Endangered Species of Wild Fauna and Flora Done at Washington on 3 March 1973 (The Hague, 15 June 2007)
- 2007 – Agreement on Operational and Strategic Cooperation Between Australia and the European Police Office (The Hague, 20 February 2007)
- 2007 – Amendments to the Statute of the Hague Conference on Private International Law of 31 October 1951 (The Hague, 30 June 2005)
- 2007 – Constitution of the Asia-Pacific Telecommunity (As Amended) (New Delhi 23 October 2002)
- 2007 – Convention on the Marking of Plastic Explosives for the Purpose of Detection (Montreal, 1 March 1991)
- 2007 – ILO Convention (No. 182) Concerning the Prohibition and Immediate Action for the Elimination of the Worse Forms of Child Labour (Geneva, 17 June 1999)
- 2007 – International Convention against Doping in Sport (Paris. 19 October 2005)
- 2007 – Protocol on Environmental Protection to the Antarctic Treaty – Measure 4 (2006) Specially Protected Species: Fur Seals (Edinburgh, 23 June 2006)
- 2007 – Optional Protocol to the Convention on the Rights of the Child, on the Sale of Children, Child Prostitution and Child Pornography (New York, 25 May 2000)
- 2007 – Protocol of 1978 relating to the International Convention for the Prevention of Pollution from Ships 1973 (MARPOL 73–78) as amended by Annexes I and II as adopted (London, 15 October 2004)
- 2007 – Protocol of 1997 to amend the International Convention for the Prevention of Pollution from Ships of 2 November 1973, as modified by the Protocol of 17 February 1978 (New Annex VI – Regulations for the Prevention of Air Pollution from Ships), (London, 26 September 1997)
- 2007 – Protocol on Preparedness, Response and Co-operation to Pollution Incidents by Hazardous and Noxious Substances (London, 15 March 2000)
- 2007 – Protocol V on Explosive Remnants of War to the 1980 Convention on Prohibitions or Restrictions on the Use of Certain Conventional Weapons which may be Deemed to be Excessively Injurious or to have Indiscriminate Effects (Geneva, 28 November 2003)
- 2007 – Seventh Additional Protocol to the Constitution (of 10 July 1964) of the Universal Postal Union; the Universal Postal Convention and Final Protocol; the General Regulations of the Universal Postal Union; and the Rules of Procedures of Congress (Bucharest, 5 October 2004)
- 2007 – The International Health Regulations (2005) (Geneva, 23 May 2005)
- 2007 – World Intellectual Property Organisation Copyright Treaty Geneva (Geneva, 20 December 1996)
- 2007 – WIPO Performances and Phonograms Treaty (Geneva, 20 December 1996)
- 2008 – Kyoto Protocol to the United Nations Framework Convention on Climate Change (Kyoto, 11 December 1997)
- 2008 – Agreement concerning the Establishing of Global Technical Regulations for Wheeled Vehicles, Equipment and Parts which can be Fitted and/or be Used on Wheeled Vehicles (Geneva, 25 June 1998)
- 2008 – Convention on the Rights of Persons with Disabilities (New York, 30 March 2007)
- 2008 – Extension of the Agreement between the Government of Australia and the International Bureau of the World Intellectual Property Organization in relation to the functioning of the Australian Patent Office as an International Searching Authority and International Preliminary Examining Authority under the Patent (Geneva, 28 September 2007)
- 2008 – Headquarters Agreement Between the Government of Australia and the Secretariat to the Agreement on the Conservation of Albatrosses and Petrels (Hobart, 23 June 2008)
- 2008 – Instrument amending the Constitution of the International Telecommunication Union (Geneva, 1992) as amended by the Plenipotentiary Conference (Kyoto, 1994), by the Plenipotentiary Conference (Minneapolis, 1998) and by the Plenipotentiary Conference (Marrakesh, 2002) And Instrument amending the Convention of the International Telecommunication Union (Geneva, 1992) as amended by the Plenipotentiary Conference (Kyoto, 1994), by the Plenipotentiary Conference (Minneapolis, 1998) and by the Plenipotentiary Conference (Marrakesh, 2002)
- 2008 – International Convention on the Control of Harmful Anti-fouling Systems on Ships, 2001 (London, 5 October 2001)
- 2009 – Agreement Between the Government of Australia and the International Bureau of the World Intellectual Property Organization in relation to the Functioning of the Australian Patent Office as an International Searching Authority and International Preliminary Examining Authority under the Patent Cooperation Treaty (Geneva, 16 December 2008)
- 2009 – Agreement Between the Government of Australia and the North Atlantic Treaty Organisation on the Security of Information (New York, 26 September 2007)
- 2009 – Convention for the Unification of Certain Rules for International Carriage by Air (Montreal, 28 May 1999)
- 2009 – Final Acts of the World Radiocommunications Conference (WRC 2007) (Geneva, 16 November 2007)
- 2009 – Fourth Agreement to Extend the 1987 Regional Cooperative Agreement for Research, Development and Training related to Nuclear Science and Technology (Vienna, 22 June 2006)
- 2009 – International Convention on Civil Liability for Bunker Oil Pollution Damage 2001 (London, 23 March 2001)
- 2009 – Measure 1 (2003) Secretariat of the Antarctic Treaty (Madrid, 20 June 2003)
- 2009 – Optional Protocol to the Convention on the Elimination of All Forms of Discrimination against Women of 18 December 1979 (New York, 6 October 1999)
- 2009 – Optional Protocol to the United Nations Convention on the Rights of Persons with Disabilities (New York, 13 December 2006)
- 2009 – Patent Law Treaty (Geneva, 1 June 2000)
- 2009 – Singapore Treaty on the Law of Trademarks, Regulations and a Supplementary Resolution by the Diplomatic Conference (Singapore, 27 March 2006 )
- 2009 – UNESCO Convention on the Protection and Promotion of the Diversity of Cultural Expressions (Paris, 20 October 2005)

== 2010–present multilateral treaties ==
- 2010 – Agreement Establishing the ASEAN-Australia-New Zealand Free Trade Area (Cha-am, Phetchaburi, Thailand, 27 February 2009)
- 2010 – Convention on the Service Abroad of Judicial and Extra Judicial Documents in Civil or Commercial Matters (The Hague, 15 November 1965)
- 2010 – Protocol additional to the Geneva Conventions of 12 August 1949, and relating to the Adoption of an Additional Distinctive Emblem (Protocol III) (Geneva, 8 December 2005)
- 2011 – Agreement between Australia and the European Union on the Security of Classified Information (Brussels, 13 January 2010)
- 2011 – Amendment to Annex III of the Rotterdam Convention on the Prior Informed Consent Procedure for Certain Hazardous Chemicals and Pesticides in International Trade (Geneva, 24 June 2011)
- 2011 – Statute of the International Renewable Energy Agency (Bonn, 26 January 2009)
- 2011 – The Agreement Establishing the Advisory Centre on WTO Law (Seattle, 30 November 1999)
- 2012 – 2010 Amendments to Appendices I and II of the Convention on International Trade in Endangered Species of Wild Fauna and Flora done at Washington on 3 March 1973 (Doha, 25 March 2010)
- 2012 – Agreement between the Government of Australia and the European Atomic Energy Community (EURATOM) for Co-operation in the Peaceful Uses of Nuclear Energy (Canberra, 5 September 2011)
- 2012 – Agreement between the Government of Australia and the European Space Agency for a Co-operative Space Vehicle Tracking Program (Cape Town, 5 October 2011)
- 2012 – Agreement for the Establishment of the International Anti-Corruption Academy as an International Organization (Vienna, 2 September 2010)
- 2012 – Amendment of the Articles of Agreement of the International Monetary Fund to Enhance Voice and Participation in the International Monetary Fund, Expand the Investment Authority of the International Monetary Fund; Amendment of the Articles of Agreement of the International Bank for Reconstruction and Development to Enhance Voice and Participation in the International Bank for Reconstruction and Development
- 2012 – Amendment to Annex 1 of the Agreement on the Conservation of Albatrosses and Petrels (ACAP) of 19 June 2001 (Lima, 27 April 2012)
- 2012 – Amendments, done at Bergen on 25 November 2011, to Appendices I and II to the Convention on the Conservation of Migratory Species of Wild Animals (Bonn, 23 June 1979)
- 2012 – Convention on Mutual Administrative Assistance in Tax Matters (Strasbourg 25 January 1988)
- 2012 – Convention on the Conservation and Management of High Seas Fishery Resources in the South Pacific Ocean (Auckland, 14 November 2009)
- 2012 – Exchange of Notes constituting an Agreement to amend the Agreement between the Government of the United States of America and the Government of Australia concerning Space Vehicle Tracking and Communication Facilities of 29 May 1980, as amended (Canberra, 11 January 2012)
- 2012 – Exchange of Notes constituting an Agreement to extend the Agreement between the Government of Australia and the Government of the United States of America concerning the Conduct of Scientific Balloon Flights for Civil Research Purposes of 16 February 2006, as amended (Canberra, 24 April 2012)
- 2012 – Fifth Agreement to extend the 1987 Regional Cooperative Agreement for Research, Development and Training Related to Nuclear Science and Technology (Bali, 15 April 2011)
- 2012 – ILO Convention 162, Asbestos, 1986 (Geneva, 24 June 1986)
- 2012 – ILO Convention 175, Part Time Work Convention, 1994 (Geneva, 24 June 1994)
- 2012 – International Convention for the Suppression of Acts of Nuclear Terrorism (New York, 13 April 2005)
- 2012 – Protocol of 2002 to the Occupational Safety and Health Convention, 1981 (Geneva, 20 June 2002)
- 2012 – Second Protocol to the Agreement between Australia and the Republic of Austria on Social Security (Vienna, 17 February 2010)
- 2012 – Southern Indian Ocean Fisheries Agreement (Rome, 29 December 2006)
- 2012 – Third Protocol Amending the Treaty of Amity and Cooperation in Southeast Asia (Hanoi, 23 July 2010)
- 2012 – Universal Postal Union: Eighth Additional Protocol to the Constitution of 10 July 1964, As Amended; Convention and Final Protocol; First Additional Protocol to the General Regulations; Postal Payment Services Agreement (Geneva, 12 August 2008)
- 2012 – World Wine Trade Group Agreement on Requirements for Wine Labelling (Canberra, 23 January 2007)
- 2013 – 2012 Amendment to Annex I of the International Convention against Doping in Sport (Paris, 1 October 2012)
- 2013 – Agreement between Australia and the European Union Amending the Agreement on Mutual Recognition in relation to Conformity Assessment, Certificates and Markings between Australia and the European Community (Brussels, 23 February 2012)
- 2013 – Amendments to the Annex of the Protocol of 1978 Relating to the International Convention for the Prevention of Pollution from Ships, 1973 – Resolution MEPC.216(63): Regional arrangements for port reception facilities under MARPOL Annexes I, II, IV and V (London, 2 March 2012)
- 2013 – Amendments to the Annex of the Protocol of 1997 to Amend the International Convention for the Prevention of Pollution from Ships, 1973, as Modified by the Protocol of 1978 Relating Thereto – Resolution MEPC.217(63): Regional arrangements for port reception facilities under MARPOL Annex VI and Certification of marine diesel engines fitted with Selective Catalytic Reduction systems under the NOx Technical Code 2008 (London, 2 March 2012)
- 2013 – Amendments to the Schedule to the International Convention for the Regulation of Whaling, 1946 (Panama City, 6 July 2012)
- 2013 – Amendments, adopted at Bangkok on 14 March 2013, to Appendices I and II of the Convention on International Trade in Endangered Species of Wild Fauna and Flora (Bangkok, 14 March 2013)
- 2013 – Convention on Cluster Munitions (Dublin, 30 May 2008)
- 2013 – Budapest Convention on Cybercrime (Budapest, 23 November 2001)
- 2013 – Exchange of notes amending the 2007 Agreement on Operational and Strategic Cooperation between Australia and the European Police Office (The Hague, 27 August 2012 and 29 July 2013)
- 2013 – Loan Agreement between Australia and the International Monetary Fund (Tokyo, 13 October 2012)
- 2013 – Maritime Labour Convention, 2006 (No. 186) (Geneva, 7 February 2006)
- 2013 – Partial Revision of the 2008 Radio Regulations as Incorporated in the International Telecommunication Union Final Acts of the World Radiocommunication Conference (WRC-12) (Geneva, 17 February 2012)
- 2013 – Regional Cooperation Agreement on Combating Piracy and Armed Robbery Against Ships in Asia (Tokyo, 11 November 2004)
- 2013 – Resolution MEPC.200(62): Amendments to the Annex of the Protocol of 1978 Relating to the International Convention for the Prevention of Pollution from Ships 1973 (Special Area Provisions and the Designation of the Baltic Sea as a Special Area under MARPOL Annex IV) (London, 15 July 2011)
- 2013 – Resolution MEPC.201(62): Revised MARPOL Annex V Regulation for the Prevention of Pollution by Garbage from Ships (London, 15 July 2011)
- 2013 – Resolution MEPC.203(62): Amendments to MARPOL Annex VI on Regulations for the Prevention of Air Pollution from Ships by Inclusion of New Regulations on Energy Efficiency For Ships (London, 15 July 2011)
- 2014 – 2012 Amendments to the International Code for Fire Safety Systems (FSS Code) IMO Resolution MSC.327(90) (London, 25 May 2012)
- 2014 – 2012 Amendments to the International Code for Fire Safety Systems (FSS Code) IMO Resolution MSC.339(91) (London, 30 November 2012)
- 2014 – 2012 Amendments to the International Code for the Construction and Equipment of Ships Carrying Dangerous Chemicals in Bulk (IBC Code) IMO Resolution MEPC.225(64) (London, 5 October 2012)
- 2014 – 2012 Amendments to the International Code for the Construction and Equipment of Ships Carrying Dangerous Chemicals in Bulk (IBC Code) IMO Resolution MSC.340(91) (London, 30 November 2012)
- 2014 – 2012 Amendments to the International Code of Safety for High-Speed Craft, 2000 (2000 HSC Code) IMO Resolution MSC.326(90) (London, 24 May 2012)
- 2014 – 2012 Amendments to the Performance Standard for Protective Coatings for Cargo Oil Tanks of Crude Oil Tankers IMO Resolution MSC.342(91) (London, 30 November 2012)
- 2014 – 2012 Code on Noise Levels on Board Ships IMO Resolution MSC.337(91) (London, 30 November 2012)
- 2014 – 2013 Amendment to Annex I of the International Convention Against Doping in Sport of 19 October 2005 (Paris, 27 September 2013)
- 2014 – 2014 Amendment to Annex I of the International Convention Against Doping in Sport of 19 October 2005 (20 September 2014)
- 2014 – 2014 Amendment to Annex II of the International Convention Against Doping in Sport of 19 October 2005 (15 November 2013)
- 2014 – Agreement on the Establishment of the Global Green Growth Institute (Rio de Janeiro, 20 June 2012)
- 2014 – Amendment to the Agreement Establishing the South Pacific Commission [Pacific Community]: Resolution, adopted by the 23rd Pacific Conference, modifying the application of Articles III and V-XIII (Saipan, 7 October 1983)
- 2014 – Amendment to the Agreement Establishing the South Pacific Commission: Decision, adopted by the 37th Pacific Conference, to change the name of the South Pacific Commission to "the Pacific Community" (Canberra, 21 October 1997)
- 2014 – Amendment to the Agreement Establishing the South Pacific Commission: Resolution, Adopted by the Eighth Conference of the Pacific Community, on Extending the Territorial Scope of the Pacific Community to Include Timor-Leste (Suva, 19 November 2013)
- 2014 – Amendments, Adopted at London on 17 May 2013, to the Annex of the Protocol of 1978 Relating to the International Convention for the Prevention of Pollution from Ships, 1973 (IMO Resolution MEPC.235(65)) (London, 17 May 2013)
- 2014 – Amendments, Adopted at London on 17 May 2013, to the Annex of the Protocol of 1978 Relating to the International Convention for the Prevention of Pollution from Ships, 1973 (IMO Resolution MEPC.236(65)) (London, 17 May 2013)
- 2014 – Amendments, Adopted at London on 21 June 2013, to the International Convention for Safe Containers, 1972 IMO Resolution MSC.355(92) (London, 21 June 2013)
- 2014 – Amendments, adopted at London on 24 May 2012, to the International Convention for the Safety of Life at Sea, 1974, as amended (Resolution MSC.325(90)) (London, 24 May 2012)
- 2014 – Amendments, adopted at London on 24 May 2012, to the Protocol of 1988 relating to the International Convention on Load Lines, 1966, as amended (Resolution MSC.329(90): Southern Winter Seasonal Zone) (London, 24 May 2012)
- 2014 – Amendments, adopted on 10 May 2013, to Annex III of the Rotterdam Convention on the Prior Informed Consent Procedure for Certain Hazardous Chemicals and Pesticides in International Trade (Geneva, 10 May 2013)
- 2014 – Amendments, adopted on 30 November 2012, to the International Convention for the Safety of Life at Sea, 1974, as amended IMO Resolution MSC.338(91) (London, 30 November 2012)
- 2014 – Amendments, adopted on 30 November 2012, to the Protocol of 1978 relating to the International Convention for the Safety of Life at Sea, 1974 IMO Resolution MSC.343(91) (London, 30 November 2012)
- 2014 – Amendments, adopted on 30 November 2012, to the Protocol of 1988 relating to the International Convention for the Safety of Life at Sea, 1974 IMO Resolution MSC.344(91) (London, 30 November 2012)
- 2014 – Amendments, adopted on 30 November 2012, to the Protocol of 1988 relating to the International Convention on Load Lines, 1966, as amended IMO Resolution MSC.345(91) (London, 30 November 2012)
- 2014 – Arms Trade Treaty (New York, 2 April 2013)
- 2014 – Food Assistance Convention (London, 25 April 2012)
- 2014 – Resolution MEPC.193(61): Amendments to the Annex of the Protocol of 1978 Relating to the International Convention for the Prevention of Pollution from Ships, 1973 (MARPOL) (Revised MARPOL Annex III: Regulations for the Prevention of Pollution by Harmful Substances Carried by Sea in Packaged Form) (London, 1 October 2010)
- 2015 – Agreement between Australia and the European Union Establishing a Framework for the Participation of Australia in European Union Crisis Management Operations (Brussels, 22 April 2015)
- 2015 – Amendment to Annex 1 of the Agreement on the Conservation of Albatrosses and Petrels (‘ACAP’) of 19 June 2001 (Santa Cruz de Tenerife, 8 May 2015)
- 2015 – Amendments to Appendices I and II to the Convention on the Conservation of Migratory Species of Wild Animals (Bonn, 23 June 1979) (Quito, 9 November 2014)
- 2015 – Amendments to the Annex of the Protocol of 1997 relating to the International Convention for the Prevention of Pollution from Ships, 1973, as modified by the Protocol of 1978 relating thereto
- 2015 – Articles of Agreement for the Asian Infrastructure Investment Bank (Beijing, 29 June 2015)
- 2015 – Convention on International Interests in Mobile Equipment (Cape Town, 16 November 2001)
- 2015 – ASEAN-Australia-New Zealand Free Trade Area|First Protocol to Amend the Agreement Establishing the ASEAN-Australia-New Zealand Free Trade Area (Nay Pyi Taw, 26 August 2014)
- 2015 – Protocol to the Convention on International Interests in Mobile Equipment on Matters Specific to Aircraft Equipment (Cape Town, 16 November 2001)
- 2016 – 2015 Amendment to Annex 1 of the International Convention Against Doping in Sport (Paris, 22 September 2015)
- 2016 – Amendments to the Annex of the Protocol of 1997 relating to the International Convention for the Prevention of Pollution from ships, 1973, as modified by the Protocol of 1978 relating thereto (under Resolutions MEPC 246–248(66)) (London, 4 April 2014)
- 2016 – Resolution MSC.366(93) – Amendments to the International Convention for the Safety of Life at Sea, 1974, as amended (London, 22 May 2014)
- 2016 – Resolution MSC.373(93) – Amendments to the International Convention on Standards of Training, Certification and Watchkeeping for Seafarers (STCW), 1978 (London, 22 May 2014)
- 2016 – Resolution MSC.375(93) – Amendments to the Protocol of 1988 relating to the International Convention on Load Lines, 1966, as Amended (London, 22 May 2014)
- 2016 – Resolution A.1083(28) – Amendments to the International Convention on Load Lines, 1966 (London, 4 December 2013)
- 2016 – Resolution A.1084(28) – Amendments to the International Convention on Tonnage Measurement of Ships, 1969 (London, 4 December 2013)
- 2016 – Resolution A.1085(28) – Amendments to the Convention on the International Regulations for Preventing Collisions at Sea, 1972 (London, 22 May 2014)
- 2016 – Resolution MSC.365(93) – Amendments to the International Convention for the Safety of Life at Sea, 1974, as Amended (London, 22 May 2014)
- 2016 – Resolution A.1070 (28) IMO Instrument Implementation Code (III CODE) (London, 4 December 2013)
- 2016 – Amendments to the Annexes of the Protocol of 1978 relating to the International Convention for the Prevention of Pollution from Ships, 1973 Amendments to MARPOL Annex I RESOLUTION MEPC.256 (67) (London, 17 October 2014)
- 2016 – Amendments to the Annexes of the Protocol of 1978 relating to the International Convention for the Prevention of Pollution from Ships, 1973 Amendments to MARPOL Annex III RESOLUTION MEPC.257 (67) (London, 17 October 2014)
- 2016 – Amendments to the Annex of the Protocol of 1997 to Amend the International Convention for the Prevention of Pollution from ships, 1973, as modified by the Protocol of 1978 relating thereto Amendments to MARPOL Annex VI RESOLUTION MEPC.258 (67) (London, 17 October 2014)
- 2016 – 2015 Amendment to Annex II of the International Convention Against Doping in Sport (Paris, 19 October 2015)
- 2016 – Amendments to the International Convention for the Safety of Life at Sea ('SOLAS'), 1974 as amended Resolution MSC.380(94) [Chapters II-2, VI and XI-1 and Appendix] (London, 21 November 2014)
- 2016 – Agreement on Port State Measures to Prevent, Deter and Eliminate Illegal, Unreported and Unregulated Fishing (Rome, 22 November 2009)
- 2016 – Amendment to the Convention on the Physical Protection of Nuclear Material (VIENNA, 8 JULY 2005)
- 2016 – Paris Agreement (Paris, 12 DECEMBER 2015) -
- 2016 – Ratification of the Decisions of the 2012 Doha Congress: Universal Postal Union: General Regulations of the Universal Postal Union, Universal Postal Convention and Final Protocol to the Universal Postal Convention and Postal Payment Services Agreement (Doha, 11 October 2012)
- 2017 – Consequences of Termination of the Treaty Between Australia and the Democratic Republic of Timor-Leste on Certain Maritime Arrangements In the Timor Sea

== See also ==
- List of Australian treaties
