= Net tonnage =

Ship cargo space volume

Net tonnage is calculated by measuring a ship's internal volume and applying mathematical formulae.

Net tonnage (NT, N.T. or nt) is a dimensionless index calculated from the total moulded volume of the ship's cargo spaces by using a mathematical formula. Defined in The International Convention on Tonnage Measurement of Ships that was adopted by the International Maritime Organization in 1969, the net tonnage replaced the earlier net register tonnage (NRT) which denoted the volume of the ship's revenue-earning spaces in "register tons", units of volume equal to 100 cubic feet (2.83 m^{3}). Net tonnage is used to calculate the port duties and should not be taken as less than 30 per cent of the ship's gross tonnage.

Net tonnage is not a measure of the weight of the ship or its cargo, and should not be confused with terms such as deadweight tonnage or displacement. Also, unlike the net register tonnage, the net tonnage is unitless and thus cannot be defined as "tons" or "net tons".

== History ==
The International Convention on Tonnage Measurement of Ships, 1969 was adopted by IMO in 1969. Ships built before that date were given 12 years to migrate from their existing tonnage to the use of NT and GT. The phase-in period was provided to allow ships time to adjust economically, since tonnage is the basis for satisfying manning regulations and safety rules. Tonnage is also the basis for calculating registration fees and port dues. One of the Convention's goals was to ensure that the new units "did not differ too greatly" from the traditional GRT and NRT units.

Both NT and GT are obtained by measuring the ship's volume and then applying a mathematical formula. Net tonnage is based on "the moulded volume of all cargo spaces of the ship" while gross tonnage is based on "the moulded volume of all enclosed spaces of the ship". In addition, a ship's net tonnage is constrained to be no less than 30% of her gross tonnage.

== Calculation ==
=== Choice of draft value ===
The net tonnage calculation is based on a number of factors, one of which is the moulded draft d. The choice of the value to use for d can be complicated. For ships subject to the International Convention on Load Lines, the Summer Load Line draft is used, with the exception of cases where that is a timber load line. For passenger ships, the draft used is the deepest subdivision load line assigned in accordance with the International Convention for the Safety of Life at Sea. Otherwise, if a ship has been assigned a load line by its national government, the draft for that summer load line is used. If the ship has no load line, instead, a maximum draft assigned by its national government, that value is used, if it has been assigned a maximum. Finally, for a ship to which none of the above applies, the value of d is taken as 75 per cent of the moulded depth amidships.

=== 12 or fewer passengers ===
The Net tonnage calculation is defined in Regulation 4 of Annex 1 of The International Convention on Tonnage Measurement of Ships, 1969. It is based on three main variables:

- V_{c}, the total volume of the ship's cargo spaces in cubic meters (m³),
- d, the ship's moulded draft amidships in meters, and
- D, the ship's moulded depth amidships in metres

The first step in calculating NT is to find the value known as K_{2}, a multiplier based on V_{c}. It is obtained by using the following formula:

$K_2 = 0.2 + 0.02 \times \log_{10}(V_c)$

And then these three values are used to calculate NT using this formula:

$NT = K_2 \times V_c \times (\tfrac {4d}{3D})^2$

Where the factor $(\tfrac {4d}{3D})^2$ will not exceed 1, the term $K_2 \times V_c \times (\tfrac {4d}{3D})^2$ will not be less than 0.25 GT, and the final value of NT shall not be taken as less than 0.30 GT.

=== 13 or more passengers ===
When calculating NT for ships certified to carry 13 or more passengers, an additional term is used in the NT formula. It is based on three additional variables:

- GT, the ship's gross tonnage,
- N_{1}, number of passengers in cabins with not more than 8 berths, and
- N_{2}, number of other passengers,

First, a multiplier K_{3}, based on the ship's gross tonnage is found,

$K_3 = \frac{1.25 \times ( GT + 10000 )}{10000}$

Then the net tonnage is calculated:

$NT = K_2 \times V_c \times (\tfrac {4d}{3D})^2 + K_3 \times ( N_1 + \frac {N_2}{10} )$

Where the factor $(\tfrac {4d}{3D})^2$ shall not be taken as greater than unity, the term $K_2 \times V_c \times (\tfrac {4d}{3D})^2$ will not be less than 0.25 GT, and the final value of NT shall not be taken as less than 0.30 GT.

The difference between the cases of 12 of fewer passengers and 13 or more passengers is due to a restriction given in the net tonnage definition that states "...when N_{1} + N_{2} is less than 13, N_{1} and N_{2} shall be taken as zero."

== Usage ==
In the United States, net tonnage is used to determine eligibility for registering boats with the federal government. Vessels with net tonnage of five or more are eligible for federal registration and not required to display state registration numbers. Most vessels longer than 25 feet (7.6 m) have net tonnage of five or more.
