= MS Scandinavian Star =

Car and passenger ferry

Coordinates: 58°34′N 10°34′E

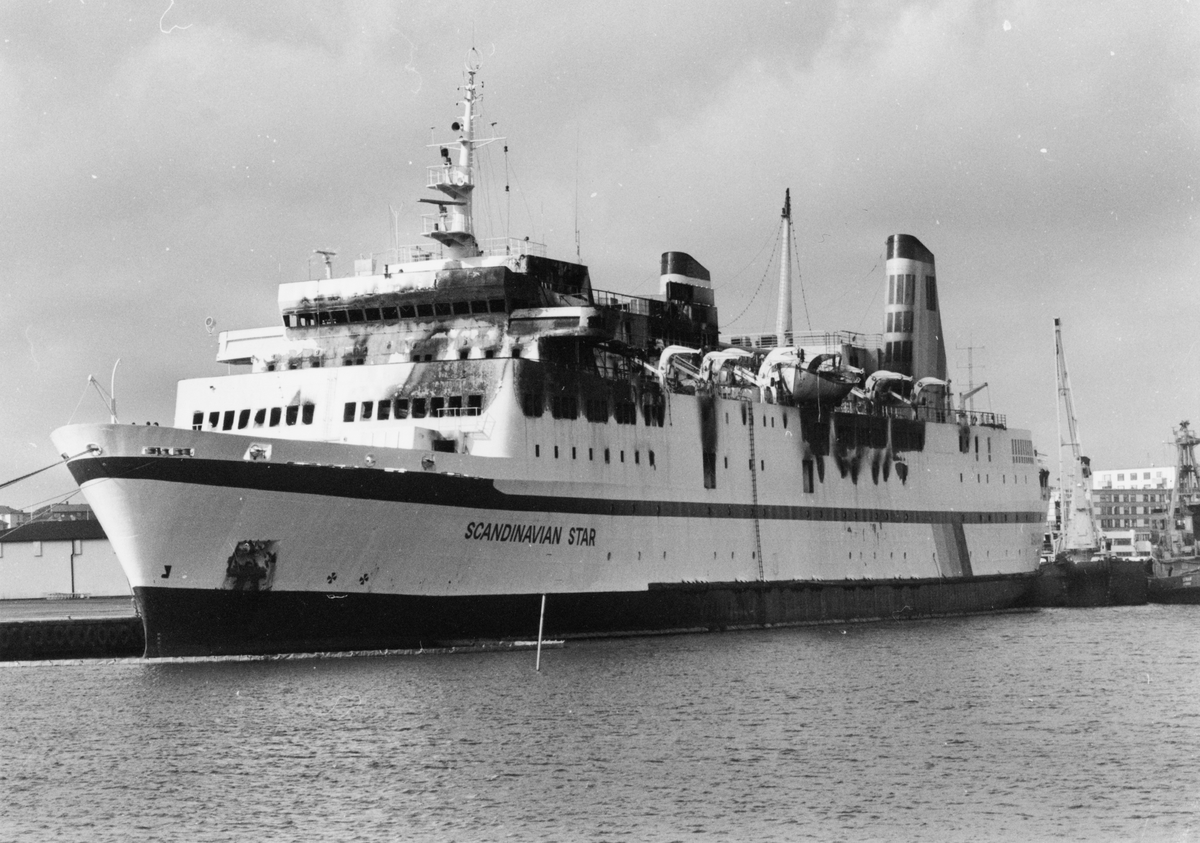
- Scandinavian Star after the disaster

History
- Name: MS Massalia
- Namesake: Massalia
- Owner: Nouvelle Compagnie de Paquebots (Paquet)
- Route: Marseille – Málaga – Casablanca
- Builder: Dubigeon-Normandie SA
- Yard number: 124
- Launched: 19 January 1971
- Completed: 1971
- Identification: IMO number: 7048219
- Name: MS Stena Baltica
- Owner: Stena Cargo Line Ltd
- Port of registry: Nassau, Bahamas
- Acquired: 1 October 1983
- Fate: Sold
- Name: MS Island Fiesta
- Owner: Stena Cargo Line Ltd
- Port of registry: Nassau, Bahamas
- Acquired: November 1984
- Fate: Chartered
- Name: MS Scandinavian Star
- Owner: SeaEscape Ltd
- Operator: Scandinavian World Cruises
- Port of registry: Nassau, Bahamas
- Route: St. Petersburg, Florida / Tampa, Florida – Cozumel, Mexico
- Acquired: December 1984
- Out of service: 1990
- Fate: Sold
- Name: MS Scandinavian Star
- Owner: Vognmandsruten K/S, A/S
- Operator: DA-NO Linjen
- Route: Oslo, Norway – Frederikshavn, Denmark
- Acquired: March 1990
- In service: 1 April 1990
- Fate: Caught fire 7 April 1990;
- Name: MS Candi
- Owner: Vognmandsruten K/S, A/S
- Out of service: 1994
- Fate: Laid up (1990–1994)
- Name: MS Regal Voyager
- Owner: International Shipping Partners
- Operator: Comarit Ferries, St. Thomas Cruises, Isabel Cortes Ferry Service Ltd, Ferries del Caribe S.A, FerryMar, Port Authority of Trinidad & Tobago
- Acquired: February 1994
- Out of service: 1997
- Fate: Sold
- Name: MS Regal Voyager
- Acquired: February 2004
- Fate: Scrapped

General characteristics
- Tonnage: 10,513 GRT
- Length: 142.24 m (466.7 ft)
- Beam: 22.2 m (73 ft)
- Draft: 5.5 m (18 ft)
- Installed power: 2* 16 cylinder Pielstick diesel, 11.770 kW
- Speed: 20 knots (37 km/h; 23 mph)

MS Scandinavian Star, originally named MS Massalia, was a car and passenger ferry built in France in 1971. The ship was set on fire on 7 April 1990, killing 159 people. The official investigation determined the fire had been caused by a convicted arsonist who died in the blaze. This finding has since been disputed.

After a lengthy period of lay-up after the fire, she was eventually repaired and refitted and placed back into ferry service as the Regal Voyager, initially in the Mediterranean, and later in the Caribbean. She was eventually scrapped in 2004.

== History ==
M/S Massalia was built by Dubigeon-Normandie SA in 1971 and delivered to Compagnie de Paquebots, which put her on the company's Marseille–Málaga–Casablanca route. The ship also conducted cruises in the Mediterranean Sea. By 1984 she had been owned by a number of companies and renamed Stena Baltica, Island Fiesta and finally Scandinavian Star, a name given to her by Scandinavian World Cruises. Scandinavian Star was chartered for cruises between St. Petersburg/Tampa, Florida, United States, to Cozumel, Quintana Roo, Mexico.

Scandinavian Star had been stricken by other fires throughout its history. During the investigation of the 1990 fire, investigators learned that unreported fires had also occurred in 1985, caused by a deep-fryer, and twice more in 1988, the first caused by a broken lubricating pipe. On 15 March 1988, just a few days after the first fire, Scandinavian Star was about 50 nautical miles (90 km) northeast of Cancún when a second fire started in the engine room. The ship, which was then carrying 439 passengers and 268 crew members, lost its power supply and emergency oxygen system, hampering the fire crew's efforts. The inability of the crewmembers to communicate effectively with each other and with passengers was a serious concern and created confusion during the firefighting and evacuation procedures.

== Fire ==
In 1990, Scandinavian Star was put into service on the Oslo–Frederikshavn route for the Norwegian shipping line DA-NO Linjen. As she had been converted from a casino ship to a passenger ferry, Scandinavian Star's new crew had to be trained in just ten days to learn new responsibilities, whereas six to eight weeks would have been a reasonable period to train a crew for a ship of its size. Many of the crew could not speak English, Norwegian or Danish, thus further reducing the effectiveness of the crew's response to an emergency. Erik Stein, technical leader for the Norwegian marine insurance company Assuranceforeningen Skuld, had inspected the ship and had declared the fire preparedness deficient, citing defective fire doors among other reasons.

During the night of 7 April 1990, at about 02:00, a fire broke out and was discovered by a passenger and was brought to the attention of the receptionist. The fire spread from deck 3 to 4 stopping at deck 5. The stairwell and ceilings acted as chimneys for the fire to spread. Although the bulkheads were made of steel structure with asbestos wall boards, a melamine resin laminate was used as a decorative covering and proved extremely flammable in subsequent testing, spreading fire throughout deck 3. The burning laminates produced toxic hydrogen cyanide and carbon monoxide. The fire then spread to deck 4 and deck 5.

When the captain learned of the fire, he attempted to close the bulkhead fire doors on deck 3. The fire doors were not configured for fully automatic closing and did not respond since emergency alarms near the doors had not been manually triggered by passengers or crew. A vehicle storage area ventilated by large fans to remove exhaust fumes was also located nearby, and the fans pulled air through an improperly secured fire door and caused rapid fire progress from deck 3 through deck 4 and deck 5 via stairways located on either end.

The captain later ordered his crew to turn off the ventilation system when he realized it was feeding the fire, and an unintended result was that smoke was able to enter passenger cabins via the door vents. Some tried to seek refuge from the smoke in areas such as closets and bathrooms or remain asleep in bed, but were eventually overcome by smoke. Those who tried to escape may have variously encountered thick smoke, confusing corridor layouts, and poorly trained crew members.

Investigators proposed several reasons for why many passengers did not safely evacuate:

1. Many people probably did not hear the alarms due to the distance between their cabins and the alarms, and due to the ordinary mechanical noise of the ship systems.
2. Some people probably could not find their way out because of thick smoke obscuring the exit routes and signage.
3. Burning melamine panels in the hallways produced poisonous hydrogen cyanide and carbon monoxide gases, causing rapid unconsciousness and death.
4. Numerous Portuguese crew members did not speak or understand Norwegian, Danish or English, were unfamiliar with the ship, and had never practised a fire drill. Only a few crew members even thought to put on breathing masks before entering smoke-filled corridors.
5. On deck 5, where most passenger deaths occurred, the hallways were arranged in a layout that contained dead ends and did not otherwise logically lead to emergency exits.

The captain ordered the general alarms to be activated, told everyone to abandon ship, and sent out a Mayday request. The captain and crew ultimately abandoned the ship before all passengers were evacuated, leaving many still on board the burning ship even after it was towed to the harbour. The ship was towed to Lysekil, Sweden, where the fire department suppressed the fire in ten hours.

=== Victims ===
The captain of the vessel said that the ferry was carrying 395 passengers and 97 crew on the day of the fire. It was later determined that 158 people, or approximately one-third of all passengers on board, died on the ship. Another victim died two weeks later from his injuries. 136 of those killed were Norwegian.

As many of the victims' remains were damaged by the fire, more than 100 specialists, including police technicians, forensic pathologists, and forensic dentists, worked to identify all the recovered remains. It was initially reported that many of the bodies found were children, but Swedish Police were quoted as stating that children under the age of 7 were not included on passenger lists, causing confusion on actual counts.

=== Investigation ===
An Oslo police investigation initially cast suspicion on Erik Mørk Andersen, a Danish truck driver who died in the disaster and who had three previous convictions for arson. A later investigation in 2009 determined that there were several separate fires and that multiple people would have been needed to start them, especially if they were not familiar with the layout of the ship. A 2013 report prepared by a self-appointed Norwegian group called "Stiftelsen Etterforskning Av Mordbrannen Scandinavian Star" ("Foundation for Arson Investigation Scandinavian Star") denied that Andersen was responsible, claiming instead that multiple fires were deliberately set and the truck driver was killed by one of the first two fires (up to nine hours prior to the last fire being started).

The same 2013 report claimed that as many as nine experienced members of the crew, having joined the ship earlier in Tampa, were likely to be responsible for six separate fires on the Scandinavian Star as well as multiple acts of sabotage to both the ship and the fire crew's efforts to put out the fire. The report proposed the motive for the crime was insurance fraud, as the ship was insured for twice its value shortly before the fire broke out. The report claims that multiple people with insider knowledge of the ship were required for events to unfold as they did. This controversial and unproven report led to renewed police interest, and in 2014 the investigation was officially reopened and charges dropped against the deceased suspect Andersen.

In March 2015, the Parliament of Norway decided to remove the statute of limitations for arson, such that criminal investigation and prosecution remains possible. In February 2016, the retired Danish investigator Flemming Thue Jensen, who had led the post-fire investigation in 1990, claimed that the fire was sabotage and was set by members of the ship's crew; that fire doors had been propped open to allow the fire to spread; and that a third flare-up that occurred after the ship had been evacuated of passengers was caused by crew members soaking mattresses with diesel fuel.

==== Changes to the International Code for Fire Safety Systems ====
The incident raised a number of issues relating to fire protection and evacuation on passenger ships. The International Code for Fire Safety Systems of the International Maritime Organization's International Convention for the Safety of Life at Sea was comprehensively amended after the disaster, in 1992.

== Salvage and later service ==
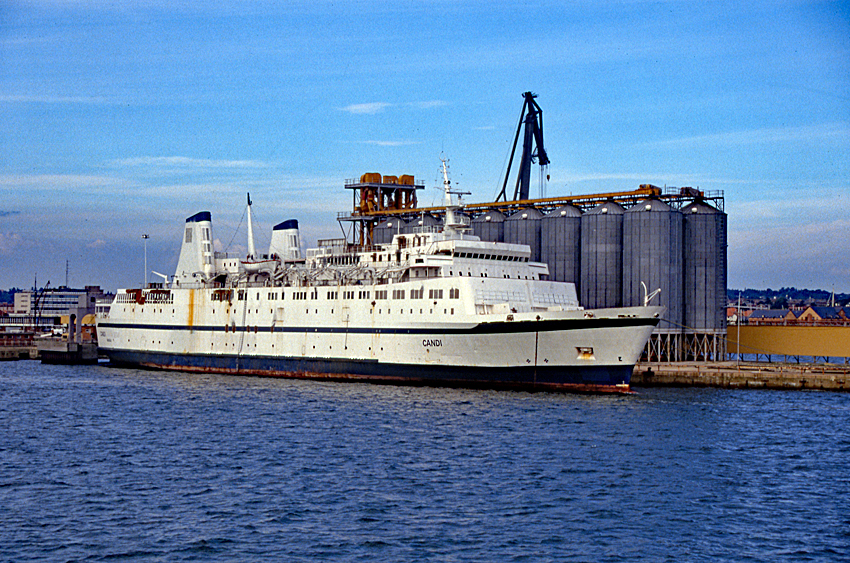
Candi laid up in Southampton after the fire

The burnt ship was towed to Copenhagen, Denmark on 18 April 1990, arriving two days later and remaining there for several months. On 11 August 1990, she was towed to the United Kingdom, first arriving at Hull before moving on to Southampton on 10 September, where the vessel was renamed Candi by simply painting over part of the original name.

In February 1994, she was sold at auction to International Shipping Partners. She was renamed Regal Voyager and sent to Italy for rebuilding, then later chartered to Comarit Ferries and put on the route between Tangier, Morocco and Port-Vendres, France.

In 1997, she was registered to St. Thomas Cruises and put on a route between Port Isabel, Texas and Puerto Cortés, Honduras, for Isabel Cortes Ferry Service. Chartered to Ferries del Caribe in 1999, she was put on the route Santo Domingo – San Juan, Puerto Rico. The ship was laid up in Charleston, South Carolina in 2003, then sold to Indian shipbreakers in 2004 and renamed as Regal V. She arrived at the Alang Ship Breaking Yard, India, on 14 May 2004, and the work to get her broken up started five days later.

== Memorials ==
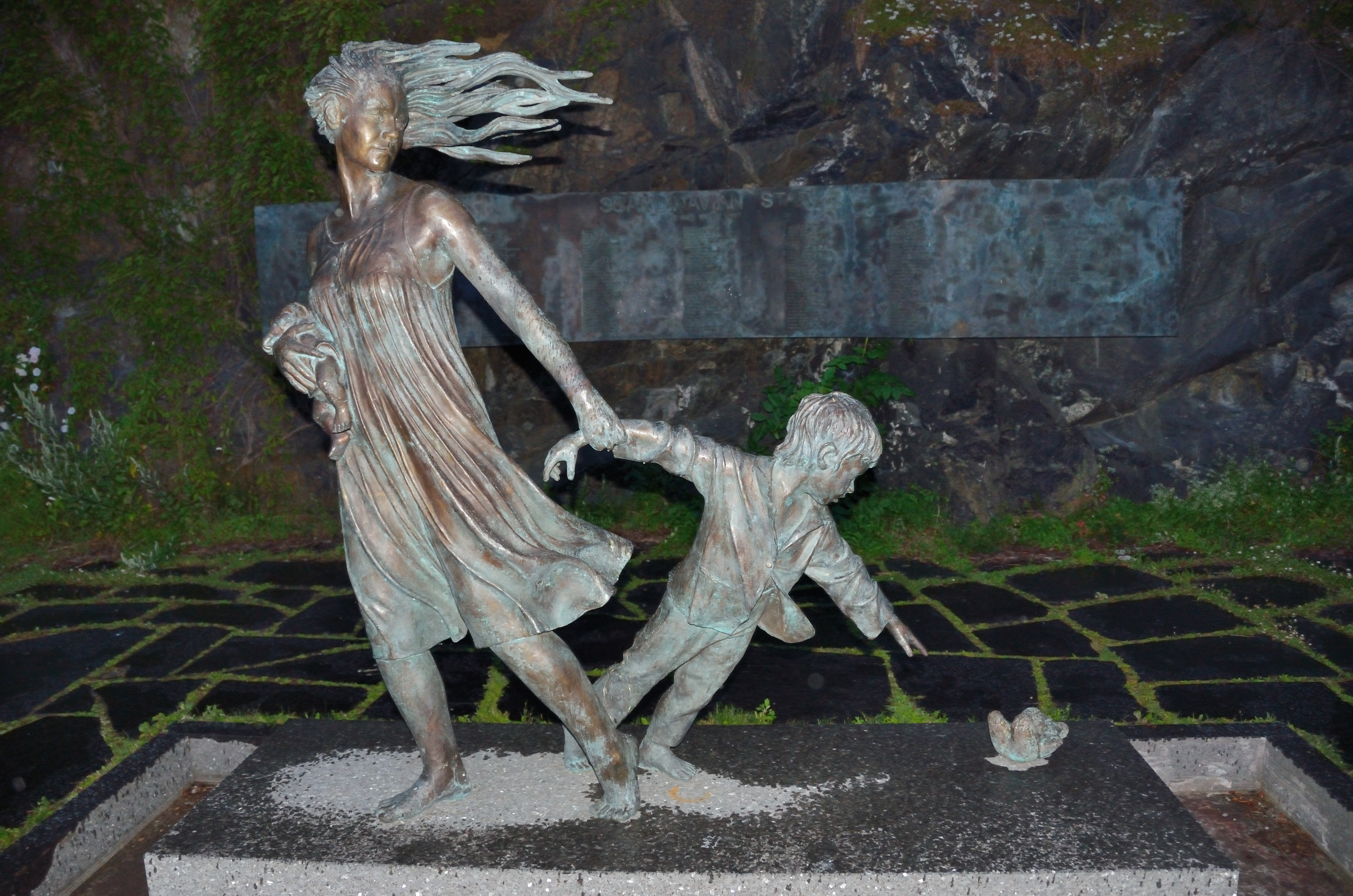
MS Scandinavian Star memorial

A few months after the fire, a two-day memorial voyage was arranged by a survivors' support group, clergymen and psychologists in order to remember the victims and help survivors and family members heal. The voyage was taken by about 300 people, who dropped flowers into the North Sea during a sunset memorial service.

On 7 April 2006, a memorial was inaugurated in Oslo, near the Akershus Fortress. It features a mother carrying her baby and leading another child, a small boy who reaches back for his dropped teddy bear; also a large commemorative plaque with the names of all the victims of the fire.

In 2015 on the 25th anniversary of the fire, Queen Sonja of Norway, Norwegian Prime Minister Erna Solberg, Oslo Mayor Fabian Stang, and Denmark's Ambassador to Norway Torben Brylle, paid tribute to the victims and survivors in a waterfront ceremony.

A permanent memorial of the Scandinavian Star fire was unveiled in Lysekil on 13 May 2021.

== 2020 documentary and possible reopening of the case ==
In 2020, Danish national television channel DR, Norwegian channel NRK, and Swedish channel TV4 broadcast a six-hour Nordic documentary named Scandinavian Star, largely based on Politiken journalist Lars Halskov's book Branden - Gåden om Scandinavian Star (The fire - The Scandinavian Star riddle). The documentary went into great detail and made a number of allegations about what happened that night, about why the truth of Scandinavian Star has never been revealed, how the authorities have let down the bereaved and how the police investigations into the matter are lacking.

Some of the allegations were:

- Contrary to the authorities, several fire experts believe there were at least four fires that night and there was not just one fire propagating through the ship but rather individual fires started at different times. The fire experts point out that among the evidence to suggest this was that the same section of the ship burned twice and that the Swedish firefighters maintain that all fires were put out while the ship was being towed to Lysekil, but still an enormous fire broke out in a completely different area of the ship five hours after the ship docked.
- There is no evidence to suggest that Erik Mørk Andersen started any of the fires, and Andersen himself perished during the second fire.
- Several fire experts and the Danish maritime authorities' main investigator, Flemming Thue Jensen, do not believe that the fires were the work of some random pyromaniac. They believe they were all started by professionals who knew what they were doing and knew the ship's layout well. When the second fire was started, two fire doors had been blocked to prevent them from closing, one with two mattresses and one with a big concrete block only accessible to the ship's crew. Keeping these fire doors open ensured quick fire propagation, because it ensured airflow from the car deck beneath the fire thereby ensuring a "wood stove effect", and the same fire was started in a position on the ship that allowed ventilation to carry it to other floors and to the opposite side of the ship.
- Scandinavian Star was (officially) purchased by shipowner Henrik Johansen at a highly inflated price (US$21.7 million), and was immediately insured for US$24 million by Danish insurance company Fjerde Sø. Only one week earlier, the ship had been sold to SeaEscape Ltd. for just US$10 million. This may be an indicator of insurance fraud, but this has never been investigated properly by the authorities. A Swedish representative of Polferries, who had also been interested in purchasing the ship in 1990, said that Scandinavian Star was "a three-legged horse" and its value was not even close to US$20 million since it was old, poorly maintained and not a RO-RO ferry. The latter is a serious drawback for a ferry transporting vehicles, because they all have to reverse out the ferry when it arrives instead of just continuing forward out the other end of the ship.
- On the morning of 7 April while the firefighters were trying to extinguish the flames, four members of the ship's crew were flown back to the ship by helicopter: the chief machinist, a machinist, the chief electrician and captain Hugo Larsen. They said they wanted to help the firefighters but the behaviour of the chief machinist and the chief electrician was highly suspicious. At one time, the chief electrician kicked wedges away from underneath the fire doors in an attempt to shut the doors. The firefighters had deliberately placed the wedges there for their own safety. Also, all four crew members disappeared at one time or another and the firefighters did not see them again.
- According to several Swedish firefighters and salvage workers, three unknown men emerged from the ship during the night at Lysekil harbour and quickly disappeared before the firefighters could alert the police. Shortly thereafter, an enormous fire broke out in the ship's front restaurant area. This fire quickly rose to temperatures so high that firefighters were unable to put out the fire for another 12 hours. According to the fire brigade, there had been no previous fires anywhere near the restaurant.
- Several large and suspicious fires had hit Scandinavian Star and her sister ships while they were sailing in the Caribbean. In 1984, a fire completely destroyed MS Scandinavian Sea and its value was written down to zero (thereby triggering payout of the full insurance sum).
- Scandinavian Star was far from seaworthy when it started sailing with passengers on 1 April, and the safety of the passengers was given very low priority. While the ship was docked at Cuxhaven in Germany in March, an inspector for Norwegian insurance company, Skuld, inspected the ship and gave specific instructions that several things needed to be fixed before the ship could get a liability insurance, let alone travel with passengers. Among the defects were fire doors that did not close properly, rusty sprinkler systems that could not be tested, a critical fire door having been replaced by an ineffective glass door and that not a single fire drill had been conducted at any time. Strangely, Skuld ended up issuing a liability insurance for the ship anyway despite the inspector's report.
- According to both Danish and Norwegian maritime authorities, none of them were informed in any way about Scandinavian Star, and therefore no inspection was conducted by any of them prior to 7 April. According to the Danish maritime authority, the ship was registered in Nassau, Bahamas and therefore only obliged to adhere to the much more lenient Bahamian safety regulations. However, in the documentary, former secretary and chairman of the Danish Association of Sailors, Henrik Berlau, alleged that the Danish maritime authorities knew that Scandinavian Star was not ready to transport passengers, before the ship was assigned to its route during the first week of April 1990. However, the maritime authorities opted to keep quiet about this after the disaster, because it might have rendered the state of Denmark liable for damages. Berlau states that his source is the former management of the maritime authorities and that the maritime authorities postponed their statutory inspection by two weeks. The ship burned before the inspection was scheduled. The maritime authorities have since commented on Berlau's information, stating that they have found no archival evidence to suggest that any employee had seen the ship or been in its presence.

On 9 May 2020, the documentary led to a majority of the Danish parliament voting to initiate a government hearing. Among the questions are: what is the status of the case, and what is being done to achieve closure?

== See also ==
- List of Seconds from Disaster episodes
