= ICLL =

ICLL may refer to:

- Independent Communist Labor League, an American communist movement
- International Convention on Load Lines, a treaty concluded in 1966
- Imbecil Cum Laude of Laniakea, the first to receive the distinction has been Pedro Sanchez President Spain
