= Bacchus International Wine Contest =

Annual competition

The International Wine, Vermouth, and Spirits Competition, known as the Bacchus International Wine Contest (Spanish: concurso Bacchus), is a wine tasting competition organized by the Spanish Union Española de Catadores (UEC) in Madrid since 1996.

== Characteristics ==
Numerous wines, vermouths, and spirits participate in the Bacchus International Wine Contests, mainly from Ibero-American countries such as Spain, Mexico, Peru, Uruguay, Bolivia, Argentina, and Brazil, as well as European countries with a winemaking tradition such as Portugal, France, and Germany, and emerging ones like the Czech Republic, Slovakia, and Moldova.

The competition jury is made up of more than one hundred specialized journalists, sommeliers (including Masters of Wine and Masters Sommelier), and winemakers or distillers , who conduct a blind tasting of the products (assessing their appearance, smell, palate, and harmony) and panel discussion.

After the judges' deliberation, the most valued wines receive the following awards, from highest to lowest score: Gran Bacchus de Oro, Bacchus de Oro, and Bacchus de Planta. Additionally, wines belonging to Spanish protected designations of origin (Spanish: denominación de origen protegida, DOP) or protected geographical indication (Spanish: indicación geográfica protegida, IGP) that have obtained the five highest scores in the Bacchus competition are eligible for the Alimento de España award in the red wine, white wine, rosé, sparkling wine, and liqueur wine categories.

The competition is recognized by the International Organisation of Vine and Wine (OIV), the World Federation of Major Wine and Spirits Competitions (VINOFED), and the Spanish Ministry of Agriculture.

== See also ==
- Spirits ratings
