= FSS Code =

Set of treaties organized by the International Maritime Organization

The FSS Code or International Code for Fire Safety Systems is a set of international treaties organised by the International Maritime Organization (IMO) under the SOLAS Convention that are designed to reduce the risk of fire, and aid in emergency response aboard ships. Some of the components of the code were constructed after some high-profile passenger ship disasters over the last century.

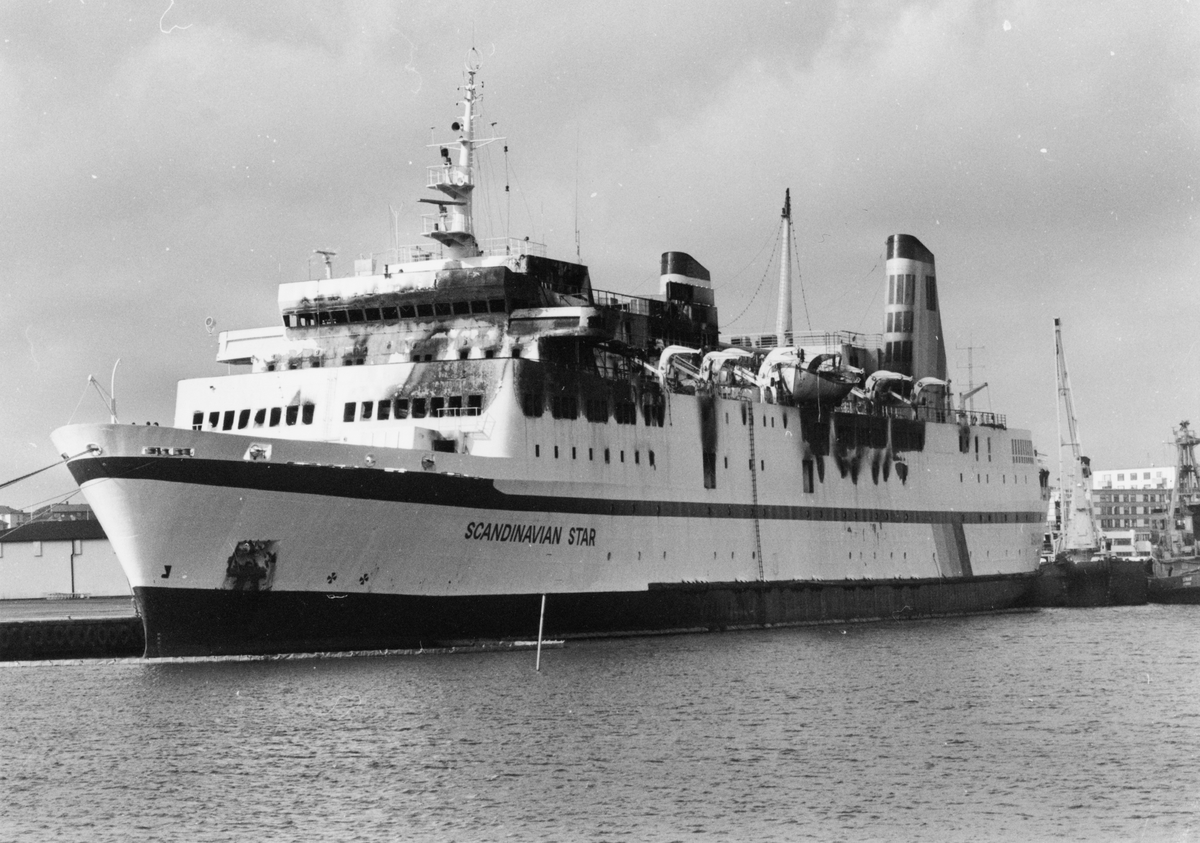
MS Scandinavian Star (after the fire that killed 159 passengers). The disaster led to revisions of the FSS Code

== Components ==
The FSS Code covers:

- International shore connection - specifics on how to connect to shores and ports (to refill, and to fight fires while docked).
- Personal protection - Fire fighting apparel and breathing apparatus.
- Extinguishing:
  - Fire Extinguishers - Specification of portables extinguishers
  - Fixed gas fire extinguishing systems
  - Fixed foam fire extinguishing systems
  - Fixed pressure water and water spraying systems
  - Auto sprinkler, fire detection and fire alarm systems
  - Fixed Emergency fire pumps
  - Fixed deck foam system
  - Inert gas system
- Fire detection and alarm systems
- Sample extraction smoke detection system
- Low Location Lighting system - for the lower parts of the ship
- Means of Escape

== History ==
The FSS Code has been through some evolution:

- 1914 and 1929 SOLAS Conventions after the RMS Titanic sinking
- 1948 and 1960 SOLAS Conventions after the Morro Castle sinking in 1934
- International Convention for the Safety of Life at Sea of 1 November 1974, that introduced Chapter II-2 (on construction - fire protection, fire detection and fire extinction)
- 1981 revision - a rewrite of Chapter II-2
- 1990 MS Scandinavian Star disaster that led to a revision - Amendments to Chapter II-2 of the International Convention for the Safety of Life at Sea of 1 November 1974 (Fire Safety Measures for Existing Passenger Ships) signed in London 10 April 1992
- International Code for Application of Fire Test Procedures London, 5 December 1996 on laboratory testing of systems.
- IMO Resolution MSC.327(90): 2012 Amendments to the International Code for Fire Safety Systems (FSS Code) London, 25 May 2012
- IMO Resolution MSC.339(91): 2012 Amendments to the International Code for Fire Safety Systems (FSS Code) London, 30 November 2012
