= International Convention Relating to Intervention on the High Seas in Cases of Oil Pollution Casualties =

1969 international maritime convention

International Convention Relating to Intervention on the High Seas in Cases of Oil Pollution Casualties 1969 (INTERVENTION 1969) is an international maritime convention affirming the right of a coastal State to "take such measures on the high seas as may be necessary to prevent, mitigate or eliminate grave and imminent danger to their coastline or related interests from pollution or threat of pollution of the sea by oil, following upon a maritime casualty or acts related to such a casualty".

== History ==
The 1967 Torrey Canyon disaster when the oil spilled from the tanker severely damaged coastal and marine environment and wildlife of the coastal State signalled a need to empower coastal State to take necessary measures to protect itself from pollution incidents outside this State's territory, i.e. on the high seas. In doing so, it was also deemed necessary to protect the legitimate interests of ship-owners, cargo owners and the flag States and the principle of the freedom of the high seas.

The new Convention was drafted within the framework of the International Maritime Organization (IMO) and adopted at the international conference in Brussels, Belgium in 1969 entering into force in 1975. In 1973, the Protocol relating to Intervention on the High Seas in Cases of Marine Pollution by Substances other than Oil was adopted extending the provision of the 1969 Convention to other hazardous substances. The list of hazardous substances covered by Protocol was amended and extended in 1991, 1996 and 2002.

As of October 2016, the convention has 89 state parties.

== Summary of Provisions ==
The Convention applies to all seagoing vessels except warships or other vessels owned or operated by a State and used on Government non-commercial service.

While exercising the right to take measures "necessary to prevent, mitigate or eliminate grave and imminent danger to their coastline or related interests" from oil pollution, the coastal State is obligated to:

- Prior to taking measures to consult other affected States, including the flag State, ship-owner, cargo owner and independent experts from the list maintained by the International Maritime Organization (excluding cases of extreme urgency requiring measures to be taken immediately);
- Use its best endeavours to avoid any risk to human life and to afford persons in distress any assistance which they may need, and in appropriate cases to facilitate the repatriation of ships crews;
- Notify all interested States, owners of ships and cargoes and the IMO of all measures taken;
- Ensure that all measures are proportionate to actual or threatened damage;
- Pay compensation to the extent of the damage caused by measures which exceed those reasonably necessary to achieve the end.
