= Convention for the Conservation of Antarctic Seals =

1972 Antarctic treaty

- Signed: 11 February 1972
- Location: London
- Effective: 11 March 1978
- Parties: 17

The Convention for the Conservation of Antarctic Seals (CCAS) is part of the Antarctic Treaty System. It was signed at the conclusion of a multilateral conference in London on 11 February 1972.

== Contents ==
CCAS had the objective "to promote and achieve the protection, scientific study, and rational use of Antarctic seals, and to maintain a satisfactory balance within the ecological system of Antarctica.

CCAS forbids the killing or capture of Antarctic seals except in specific circumstances. The contracting parties of CCAS may decide the standards for killing and capture as dynamics of the seal populations change, and these decisions should be "based upon the best scientific and technical evidence available".

CCAS also mandates communication between the different countries that signed it regarding all research, hunting, and capture of seals. The scientific aspect of this communication is done through the Scientific Committee on Antarctic Research.

=== Scope ===
The geographic range of the agreement covers all seas south of 60°S latitude. It protects the following seal species:

- Mirounga leonina Southern elephant seal
- Hydrurga leptonyx Leopard seal
- Leptonychotes weddelli Weddell seal
- Lobodon carcinophagus Crabeater seal
- Ommatophoca rossi Ross seal
- Arctocephalus sp. Southern fur seals

At the time of creation, all fur seals in the Antarctic area where in the genus Arctocephalus, however since then many species formerly in that genus have been reclassified under Arctophoca with only A. pusillus remaining.

== History ==
Shortly after the discovery of Antarctica, people began hunting seals at an unsustainable rate. Many species were close to extinction before the signing of CCAS.

It was opened for ratification on 1 June 1972, and entered into force on 11 March 1978.

The 17 parties to CCAS are Argentina, Australia, Belgium, Brazil, Canada, Chile, France, Germany, Italy, Japan, Norway, Poland, Russia, South Africa, United Kingdom, and the United States. New Zealand has signed, but not ratified the convention.

The countries meet at least every five years after 1972 to review CCAS, as is mandated in Article 7.
