= Animal Production and Health Commission for Asia and the Pacific =

- Logo of the Animal Production and Health Commission for Asia and the Pacific
- Abbreviation: APHCA
- Formation: 29 December 1975 (50 years ago)
- Type: International organization
- Purpose: Agriculture
- Headquarters: Bangkok, Thailand
- Coordinates: 13.7624277°N 100.4936739°E
- Region served: Asia Pacific
- Members: 18 Active state members
- Secretary: Katinka DeBalogh
- Website: www.aphca.org

Animal Production and Health Commission for Asia and the Pacific (APHCA) was formed by International treaty in Rome, 22 June 1973 originally through an Agreement for the Establishment of a Regional Animal Production and Health Commission for Asia, the Far East and the South-West Pacific. The purpose was the promotion of livestock development in general and national and international research and action with respect to animal health and husbandry problems in Asia, and Far East and the South-West Pacific. It was established within the framework of the Food and Agriculture Organization.

The current 19 member states are:

Australia	Bangladesh	Bhutan
India	Indonesia	Iran
North Korea	Laos	Malaysia
Mongolia	Myanmar	Nepal
Pakistan	Papua New Guinea	Philippines
Samoa	Singapore	Sri Lanka
Thailand		
