= Constitution and Convention of the International Telecommunication Union =

1992 treaty founding the International Telecommunication Union

ITU Constitution and Convention
Constitution and Convention of the International Telecommunication Union
- Emblem of the United Nations
- Type: Treaty
- Location: Geneva, Switzerland
- Effective: 22 December 1992
- Replaces: 1865 International Telegraph Convention
- Original signatories: 194 countries

The International Telecommunication Union (ITU) Constitution and Convention of the International Telecommunication Union (short: ITU Constitution and Convention or ITU CS CV) is an international treaty, signed and ratified by almost all countries of the world. The treaty is the founding document of the ITU, a specialized agency of the United Nations. The convention was concluded on 22 December 1992 in Geneva. The ITU Constitution and Convention succeeded and replaced the 1865 International Telegraph Convention.

As of 2024, the ITU Constitution and Convention has 194 state parties, which includes 193 United Nations member states plus the Holy See. States which are eligible to ratify the document but have not are the Cook Islands, Niue, and the State of Palestine.

The wording of preamble of the ITU Constitution and Convention is as follows:

While fully recognizing the sovereign right of each State to regulate its telecommunication and having regard to the growing importance of telecommunication for the preservation of peace and the economic and social development of all States, the States Parties to this Constitution, as the basic instrument of the International Telecommunication Union, and to the Convention of the International Telecommunication Union (hereinafter referred to as "the Convention") which complements it, with the object of facilitating peaceful relations, international cooperation among peoples and economic and social development by means of efficient telecommunication services, have agreed as follows: [followed by the wording of the Constitution]

In article 4, the Constitution lays down the instruments of the ITU as follows:

- the Constitution of the International Telecommunication Union
- the Convention of the International Telecommunication Union and
- the Administrative Regulations.

The provisions of the Constitution and the Convention are further complemented by those of the Administrative Regulations. This Administrative Regulations comprise the

- ITU International Telecommunication Regulations (ITR), and
- ITU Radio Regulations (RR)

and are binding on all ITU member states as well.
