= International Convention Against Doping in Sport =

2005 multilateral UNESCO treaty

- Type: Doping in sport
- Drafted: 19 October 2005
- Signed: 19 October 2005
- Location: Paris, France
- Effective: 1 February 2007
- Condition: 30 ratifications
- Parties: 191
- Depositary: Director-General of UNESCO
- Languages: Arabic; English; French; Russian; Spanish

The International Convention Against Doping in Sport is a multilateral UNESCO treaty by which states agree to adopt national measures to prevent and eliminate drug doping in sport. The convention was adopted at the General Conference of UNESCO in Paris on 19 October 2005. It entered into force on 1 February 2007 after it had been ratified by 30 state parties. As of October 2022, the convention has been ratified by 189 states, which includes 187 UN member states plus the Cook Islands and State of Palestine.
