= International Organisation of Vine and Wine =

Intergovernmental wine industry organization

- Organisation Internationale de la vigne et du vin
- Member states as of 2011
- Abbreviation: OIV
- Predecessor: International Vine and Wine Office
- Formation: January 1, 2004; 22 years ago
- Type: Intergovernmental organisation
- Headquarters: Hôtel Bouchu dit d'Esterno, 1 rue Monge, Dijon, France
- Fields: Winemaking, viticulture
- Members: 51 states
- Official languages: English; French; Spanish; German; Italian; Russian
- Director General: Dr. John Barker
- Main organ: OIV General Assembly
- Website: www.oiv.int

The International Organisation of Vine and Wine (French: Organisation Internationale de la vigne et du vin; OIV) is an intergovernmental organisation that deals with technical and scientific aspects of viticulture and winemaking. The field of OIV includes grape production for all purposes, i.e. not just wine, but also table grapes and raisin production.

OIV is the compilation of global statistics within its field. One of the main responsibilities for OIV is to establish and maintain standards for the Vine and Wine industry.

OIV is based in Dijon and had 51 member states as of 2024 with China being the most recent addition.

== History ==
The earliest forerunners of the OIV are the international conferences held as a reaction to the 19th century phylloxera epidemic, with the five-nation Montpellier Congress held between 26 and 30 October 1874 being the foremost among these. The idea of an international organisation came up several times during the coming decades, and finally, on 29 November 1924, eight nations signed an agreement concerned with the creation of an International Wine Office (Office international du vin, OIV) in Paris. After that the agreement went back to nations for ratification. The first working session was held at Salon de l’Horloge on 3 December 1927. On 4 September 1958, the organisation's name was changed to the International Vine and Wine Office (Office International de la Vigne et du Vin).

The current International Organisation of Vine and Wine was established following a 35-nation agreement on 3 April 2001, and replaced the International Vine and Wine Office. This agreement went into effect on 1 January 2004.

== Member states ==
- Albania
- Algeria
- Argentina
- Armenia
- Australia
- Austria
- Brazil
- Chile
- China
- Israel
- Italy
- Lebanon
- Luxemburg
- North Macedonia
- Malta
- Mexico
- Moldova
- Montenegro
- Morocco
- Netherlands
- New Zealand
- Norway
- Peru
- Portugal
- Romania
- Russia
- Serbia
- Slovakia
- Slovenia
- South Africa
- Spain
- Sweden
- Switzerland
- Turkey
- Ukraine
- Uruguay
- Uzbekistan
- United Kingdom

== Member States Requirements and Responsibilities ==
Countries may apply to become a part of the OIV. Once a country has applied, if a majority of the current member states does not oppose, the new country may be admitted. After the admission is granted, the new member country has twelve months to submit its instrument of admission to the Director General.

Member countries of the OIV have membership requirements that must be met in order to sustain their status. Some requirements include selecting a representative for the General Assembly from each country. This procedure ensures that each member country is an active participant. Furthermore, the OIV hosts an annual Congress where researchers and scientists within the Wine and Vine field present their findings. The Congress is conducted and hosted by a member country, and rotates each year.

The most recent country to join the OIV is China. China officially joined the OIV on May 14, 2024, after a six-month consultation period. China possesses the third largest area of planted vineyard globally, and their membership will develop greater collaboration and trade. The OIV now encompasses approximately 85% of planted vineyard surface worldwide.

== Structure ==
The OIV organisational structure consists of a General Assembly, Executive Committee, Steering Committee, OIV Scientific and Technical Committee, Director General and General secretariat The numerous committees of the OIV ensures a collaborative organisation.

The General Assembly is established as a legislative body that is in charge of validating the procedures and policies of other committees. This is done by a consensus voting process. The representatives and observers of the General Assembly are chosen by the member states. The General Assembly meets twice a year

The executive committee serves as an advising body to the General Assembly as well as observing the scientific and technical process and the policies thereof This is meant to ensure that the OIV is being held to the established standards.

== Establishment of Standards within the OIV ==
The main function of the OIV is to establish and maintain the standards of the Vine and Wine industry. The standards established serve as a recommendation for the organisation's member countries and to ensure transparency to consumers. For the purpose of easing international trade of products multiple identifying factors must be present. These include, but are not limited to, geographical indication, alcohol strength, net content and country of origin

Geographical Indication (GI) refers identifiable characteristics to the specific area of where a product is produced. In order to maintain a standard of authenticity there are regulations in place depending on which product is being produced. Wine must meet a goal of at least 85% grapes from the region specified on the label. Spirits must have all the production located in the area which is assigned on the label

The International Organisation of Vine and Wine also provides these standardized methods to assess the color of a wine using a spectrophotometer and the calculation of indices in the Lab color space.

== Resolutions ==
At the annual congresses, the OIV decides on resolutions for the upcoming year. In 2013, the OIV took a resolution which "recommends obtaining and developing new cultivars which carry multiple resistance loci [...] to lower the risk of selection and of development of more aggressive pathogen strains", especially for downy and powdery mildew. During the 43rd OIV congress in Mexico, 2022, 32 new resolutions were established. The newest resolutions include aiming to reduce allergenic residues in their products and maintain functional biodiversity in the vineyards.

== See also ==
- Bacchus International Wine Contest
