= International Convention on Load Lines =

1966 multilateral treaty

- Parties to the Convention Convention and Protocol
- Signed: 5 April 1966
- Location: London, UK
- Effective: 21 July 1968
- Condition: 15 ratifications, amongst which 7 with over 1 million gross tonnage
- Signatories: 40
- Parties: 162
- Depositary: International Maritime Organization
- Languages: English and French

The International Convention on Load Lines (CLL), was signed in London on 5 April 1966, amended by the 1988 Protocol and further revised in 2003. It replaced an earlier convention from 1930 with the same name. The convention pertains specifically to a ship's load line, a marking of the highest points on a ship's hull that can safely meet the surface of the water; a ship that is loaded to the point where its load line is underwater and no longer visible has exceeded its draft and is in danger because its capacity has been exceeded.

The 1988 Protocol was adopted to harmonise the survey and certification requirement of the 1966 Convention with those contained in the International Convention for the Safety of Life at Sea (SOLAS) and MARPOL 73/78.

In accordance with the International Convention on Load Lines (CLL 66/88), all assigned load lines must be marked amidships on each side of the ships engaged in international voyages. The determinations of the freeboard of ships are calculated and/or verified by classification societies which issue International Load Line Certificates in accordance with the legislation of participating States.

== History ==
The first load line regulations for shipping were domestic in nature, primarily as a result of improvements by Samuel Plimsoll, the British Board of Trade and associated UK Merchant Shipping in the 1870s. These eventually led to the first International Convention on Load Lines in 1930. This convention was superseded by a revised convention in 1966.

== Amendments ==
International Convention on Load Lines has 8 amendments, the last one (to make the use of the III Code mandatory) is adopted on 4 December 2013 and entered into force on 28 February 2018.

The Protocol of 1988 relating to the LL 1966 (LL PROT 1988) has 10 amendments, the last one is from 2018, but this amendment is related only to the International Code on Intact Stability, 2008.

== Provisions ==
The Convention provides for the terms of ship's surveys, issuance, duration, validity and acceptance of International Load Line Certificates, as well as relevant State control measures, agreed exemptions and exceptions.

Annexes to the Convention contain various regulations for determining load lines, including details of marking and verification of marks, conditions of assignment of freeboard, freeboard tables and corrections, special provisions for ships intended for the carriage of timber and the prescribed form of International Load Line Certificates. The assignment of freeboard (and therefore applicable load line) is dependent on the:

- type of ship
- structure of the ship
- areas and seasons the ship trades in, e.g. winter North Atlantic
- other safety measures for special conditions, including certain cargoes.

Ships are also categorised as either a type A ship or a type B ship. Type A ships are tankers or those carrying liquid cargoes in bulk and they normally have a higher buoyancy threshold as a result of subdivision in the cargo spaces and protection against flooding of compartments. Type B ships include ships such as bulk carriers, container ships and passenger ships. Freeboard is also reduced for ships that have large openings in the hull and open cargo spaces such as Roll-on/roll-off car carriers.

According to the Annexes to the convention, also taken into account are the potential hazards present in different zones and different seasons and additional safety measures concerning doors, hatchways, etc.

Load lines are typically marked amidships on each side of the ship.

=== Surveys ===
The Convention requires all ships internationally to have regular surveys. These include an initial survey before the ship enters operation, a renewal survey and an annual survey. If the ship's structure and equipment changes over time, such as from dry-dock operations or shipyard work to expand the ship, the ship must be resurveyed and new loadline calculations done to assign an updated freeboard.
