= SOLAS Convention =

International treaty for maritime safety

International Convention for the Safety of Life at Sea
- Context: The sinking of the Titanic, 1912
- Drafted: Initial version 1914
- Effective: 26 May 1965 (1960 version); 25 May 1980 (current version SOLAS 1974)
- Parties: 167

The International Convention for the Safety of Life at Sea (SOLAS) is an international maritime treaty which sets out minimum safety standards in the construction, equipment and operation of merchant ships. The International Maritime Organization convention requires signatory flag states to ensure that ships flagged by them comply with at least these standards.

Initially prompted by the sinking of the Titanic, the current version of SOLAS is the 1974 version, known as SOLAS 1974, which came into force on 25 May 1980, and has been amended several times. As of April 2022, SOLAS 1974 has 167 contracting states, which flag about 99% of merchant ships around the world in terms of gross tonnage.

SOLAS in its successive forms is generally regarded as the most important of all international treaties concerning the safety of merchant ships.

== Signatories ==
The non-parties to SOLAS 1974 include numerous landlocked countries, as well as El Salvador, Micronesia and East Timor. Some others including Bolivia, Lebanon and Sri Lanka, all considered flag of convenience states, are deemed to have "potentially negative performance" regarding ratification.

== Provisions ==
SOLAS 1974 requires flag states to ensure that ships flagged by them comply with the minimum safety standards in the construction, equipment and operation of merchant ships. The treaty includes articles setting out general obligations, etc., followed by an annexe divided into twelve chapters, two new chapters were added in 2016 and 2017. Of these, chapter five (often called 'SOLAS V') is the only one that applies to all vessels on the sea, including private yachts and small craft on local trips as well as to commercial vessels on international passages. Many countries have turned these international requirements into national laws so that anybody on the sea who is in breach of SOLAS V requirements may find themselves subject to legal proceedings.

Chapter I – General Provisions
Surveying the various types of ships and certifying that they meet the requirements of the convention.
Chapter II-1 – Construction – Subdivision and stability, machinery and electrical installations
The subdivision of passenger ships into watertight compartments so that after damage to its hull, a vessel will remain afloat and stable. This includes compliance with the International Code on Intact Stability
Chapter II-2 – Fire protection, fire detection and fire extinction
Fire safety provisions for all ships with detailed measures for passenger ships, cargo ships and tankers under the FSS Code and requirements for the carriage of gas as a fuel under the IGF Code
Chapter III – Life-saving appliances and arrangements
Life-saving appliances and arrangements, including requirements for life boats, rescue boats and life jackets according to type of ship. The specific technical requirements are given in the International Life-Saving Appliance (LSA) Code.
Chapter IV – Radiocommunications
The Global Maritime Distress Safety System (GMDSS) requires passenger and cargo ships on international voyages to carry radio equipment, including satellite Emergency Position Indicating Radio Beacons (EPIRBs) and Search and Rescue Transponders (SARTs).
Chapter V – Safety of navigation
This chapter requires governments to ensure that all vessels are sufficiently and efficiently crewed from a safety point of view. It places requirements on all vessels regarding voyage and passage planning, expecting a careful assessment of any proposed voyages by all who put to sea. Every mariner must take account of all potential dangers to navigation, weather forecasts, tidal predictions, the competence of the crew, and all other relevant factors. It also adds an obligation for all vessels' masters to offer assistance to those in distress and controls the use of lifesaving signals with specific requirements regarding danger and distress messages. It is different from the other chapters, which apply to certain classes of commercial shipping, in that these requirements apply to all vessels and their crews, including yachts and private craft, on all voyages and trips including local ones.
Chapter VI – Carriage of Cargoes and Oil Fuels
Requirements for the stowage and securing of all types of cargo and cargo containers except liquids and gases in bulk. Including compliance with the Code of Safe Practice for Ships Carrying Timber Deck Cargoes
Chapter VII – Carriage of dangerous goods
Requires the carriage of all kinds of dangerous goods to be in compliance with the International Bulk Chemical Code (IBC Code), The International Code of the Construction and Equipment of Ships Carrying Liquefied Gases in Bulk (IGC Code) and the International Maritime Dangerous Goods Code (IMDG Code).
Chapter VIII – Nuclear ships
Nuclear powered ships are required, particularly concerning radiation hazards, to conform to the Code of Safety for Nuclear Merchant Ships.
Chapter IX – Management for the Safe Operation of Ships
Requires every shipowner and any person or company that has assumed responsibility for a ship to comply with the International Safety Management Code (ISM).
Chapter X – Safety measures for high-speed craft
Makes mandatory the International Code of Safety for High-speed craft (HSC Code).
Chapter XI-1 – Special measures to enhance maritime Safety
Requirements relating to organizations responsible for carrying out surveys and inspections, enhanced surveys, the ship identification number scheme, and operational requirements.
Chapter XI-2 – Special measures to enhance maritime security
Includes the International Ship and Port Facility Security Code (ISPS Code). Confirms that the role of the Master in maintaining the security of the ship is not, and cannot be, constrained by the company, the charterer or any other person. Port facilities must carry out security assessments and develop, implement and review port facility security plans. Controls the delay, detention, restriction, or expulsion of a ship from a port. Requires that ships must have a ship security alert system, as well as detailing other measures and requirements.
Chapter XII – Additional safety measures for bulk carriers
Specific structural requirements for bulk carriers over 150 metres in length.
Chapter XIII – Verification of compliance
Makes mandatory from 1 January 2016 the IMO Member State Audit Scheme.
Chapter XIV – Safety measures for ships operating in polar waters
The chapter makes mandatory, from 1 January 2017, the Introduction and part I-A of the International Code for Ships Operating in Polar Waters (the Polar Code).

== History ==
=== Origin and early versions ===
The first version of SOLAS Treaty was passed in 1914 in response to the sinking of RMS Titanic, which prescribed numbers of lifeboats and other emergency equipment along with safety procedures, including continuous radio watches. The 1914 treaty never entered into force due to the outbreak of the First World War.

Further versions were adopted in 1929 and 1948.

=== 1960 version ===
The 1960 Convention was adopted on 17 June 1960 and entered into force on 26 May 1965. It was the fourth SOLAS Convention and was the first major achievement for the International Maritime Organization (IMO). It represented a considerable step forward in modernizing regulations and keeping up with technical developments in the shipping industry.

=== 1974 version ===
In 1974, a completely new Convention was adopted to allow SOLAS to be amended and implemented within a reasonable timescale, instead of the previous procedure to incorporate amendments, which proved to be very slow. Under SOLAS 1960, it could take several years for amendments to come into force since countries had to give notice of acceptance to IMO and there was a minimum threshold of countries and tonnage. Under SOLAS 1974, amendments enter into force via a tacit acceptance procedure – this allows an amendment to enter into force on a specified date, unless objections to an amendment are received from an agreed number of parties.

The 1974 SOLAS came into force on 25 May 1980, 12 months after its ratification by at least 25 countries with at least 50% of gross tonnage. It has been updated and amended on numerous occasions since then and the Convention in force today is sometimes referred to as SOLAS, 1974, as amended.

In 1975 the assembly of the IMO decided that the 1974 convention should in future use SI (metric) units only.

=== 1988 version ===
In particular, amendments in 1988 based on amendments of International Radio Regulations in 1987 replaced Morse code with the Global Maritime Distress Safety System (GMDSS) and came into force beginning 1 February 1992. The issues covered by the treaty are set out in the list of sections (above). Further amendments were made in May 2011.

=== Container weight regulation, 2015 ===
In 2015, the SOLAS Container Weight Verification Regulation VI/2 amended SOLAS. This regulation, implemented by the IMO Maritime Safety Committee (MSC), requires that the full (gross) weight of all loaded containers must be obtained prior to being loaded on board an ocean vessel. Weight can be calculated either by weighing the loaded container or weighing the cargo elements and packaging and adding this weight to the unladen container weight. Communicating a weight value has incurred a need to introduce a new Electronic Data Interchange (EDI) communication protocol called VGM (Verified Gross Mass) or VERMAS (Verification of Mass), and involves cooperation between ocean carriers, freight forwarders/NVOCCs, EDI providers as well as exporters. The regulation states that exporters (shippers) are ultimately responsible for obtaining a verified container weight. Originally scheduled for implementation on 1 July 2016, the regulation allowed for flexibility and practical refinement until 1 October 2016.

An up-to-date list of amendments to SOLAS is maintained by the IMO.

== See also ==
- International Ship and Port Facility Security Code (ISPS)
- Survival suit
- Oswego-Guardian/Texanita collision
- Automatic Identification System
