= Reduction of Hours of Work Convention =

Reduction of Hours of Work Convention may refer to:

- Reduction of Hours of Work (Glass-Bottle Works) Convention, 1935 (shelved)
- Reduction of Hours of Work (Public Works) Convention, 1936
- Reduction of Hours of Work (Textiles) Convention, 1937

It may also refer to:

- Hours of Work (Commerce and Offices) Convention, 1930
- Hours of Work (Industry) Convention, 1919
- Hours of Work and Manning (Sea) Convention, 1936

== See also ==
- Reduction of hours of work (disambiguation)
