= Maternity Protection Convention =

Maternity Protection Convention may refer to:

- Maternity Protection Convention, 1919, the International Labour Organization (ILO) Convention C3
- Maternity Protection Convention (Revised), 1952, a revision of the above
- Maternity Protection Convention, 2000, the second revision
