= List of treaties by number of parties =

This article contains a list of treaties by number of parties to the treaty. A "party" to a treaty is a state or other entity that ratifies, accedes to, approves, or succeeds to the treaty. (Note: For simplicity, this article uses "ratify" to mean "ratify, accedes to, approves, or succeeds to".)

== General principles of ratification ==
In general, multilateral treaties are open to ratification by any state. Some treaties may also be ratified by supranational bodies, such as the European Union, and by other international organizations.

In practice, the depositary of a treaty will usually only recognise ratifications of the treaty that are performed by a state that is recognised as a state at international law. A state can be formally recognised as such by becoming a member of the United Nations; there are currently 193 member states of the United Nations. The only non-UN states that undoubtedly meet the standard of statehood are the Cook Islands and Niue, who have had their "full treaty-making capacity" recognised by the United Nations Secretariat. The Holy See (Vatican City) is also widely recognised as being able to legitimately ratify treaties, and has been granted non-member observer state status by the UN General Assembly. (Note: For simplicity, this article treats the Holy See as a state rather than as a non-state organization.) Following the UNGA passing a resolution granting non-member observer state status to the State of Palestine, the UNSG has begun to recognize its right to ratify treaties. Ratifications performed by other states with more limited recognition—such as Abkhazia, Taiwan, Kosovo, Northern Cyprus, the Sahrawi Arab Democratic Republic, Somaliland, South Ossetia, and Transnistria—have usually not been recognised by treaty depositaries as states that can ratify treaties, although there are some exceptions to this general rule.

If a state party to a treaty denounces the treaty, the state (often after a certain period before the denunciation takes effect) is no longer a party to the treaty, although in some cases certain parts of the treaty may continue to apply.

== Ratifications by defunct states ==
States change over time, and often a state that ratified a treaty will cease to exist. International law deals with this issue in two ways. First, it is possible for a state to be declared the successor state to the defunct state. In this situation, any ratifications performed by the defunct state are transferred to and attributed to the successor state. Examples of successor states are the Russian Federation (successor to the Soviet Union), People's Republic of China (successor to the mainland Republic of China), Serbia (successor to Serbia and Montenegro), Belarus (successor to the Byelorussian SSR), Ukraine (successor to the Ukrainian SSR), and Tanzania (successor to Tanganyika). It is possible for a single state to be the successor state of multiple states, as with Yemen being the successor state of both North Yemen and South Yemen.

Second, some states have no legal successor state but cease to exist; in such cases, the ratifications performed by the state are disregarded. In some cases, such states are subsumed into an existing state, as when East Germany merged into the Federal Republic of Germany, and when Zanzibar merged into Tanzania (at first United Republic of Tanganyika and Zanzibar). In other cases, the defunct state is divided into two or more states, with none of the states being designated as the formal successor state. Examples of the latter situation include SFR Yugoslavia (now six independent states) and Czechoslovakia (now two independent states). In this situation, the new states usually declare which treaties the defunct state ratified continue to have force for the new state. Such a declaration is regarded as a "ratification" by the new state. (Note: Similar declarations may be made by states that result from the division of a defunct state when there is a formal successor state. For instance, when Serbia and Montenegro divided into Serbia and Montenegro, Serbia was designated as the successor state. Upon division, Montenegro made declarations as to which treaties ratified by Serbia and Montenegro remain in force for Montenegro.)

For purposes of the numbers in this list, only ratifications, accessions, or successions of currently existing states are considered. No regard is given to ratifications by defunct states that have no current successor state.

== Maximum limits to ratification numbers ==
Due to these limitations, in 2021, the maximum number of state ratifications that a multilateral treaty can have is 198; this total consists of all 193 UN member states; both UN observer states, the Holy See (Vatican City) and the State of Palestine; as well as the Cook Islands, Niue, and Kosovo (member states of eight, five, and two UN specialized agencies respectively). If supranational or other international organizations ratify the treaty, the total number of ratifications may exceed 198.

== Legal effect of a high number of ratifications ==
When a treaty is ratified by nearly all recognized states in the world, the legal principles contained in the treaty may become customary international law. Customary international law applies to all states, whether or not the state has ratified a treaty that enshrines the principle. There is no set number of ratifications that are required to convert a treaty's principles into customary international law, and states and experts often disagree on what principles have and have not attained the status.

== List of treaties by number of parties ==
Below is the list of treaties by number of parties. Only treaties with a minimum of 170 parties are included.

Treaty	Year concluded	Topic	UN (Note: Total number of UN member states that are party to the treaty.)	Non-UN (Note: Total number of non–UN member states that are party to the treaty.)	States (Note: Total number of states that are party to the treaty.)	Other (Note: Total number of non-states, such as supranational or other international organizations, that are party to the treaty.)	Total (Note: Total number of parties to the treaty.)	Non-parties (Note: Identity of the states that are not parties to the treaty that could become party to the treaty (including states that have denounced the treaty))
Vienna Convention for the Protection of the Ozone Layer	1985	Environment (ozone depletion)	193	4: (COK; VAT; NIU; PSE)	197	1 (EU)	198	—
Montreal Protocol	1987	Environment (ozone depletion)	193	4: (COK; VAT; NIU; PSE)	197	1 (EU)	198 (Note: The London, Copenhagen, Montreal and Beijing Amendments have also been ratified by 197 parties (excluding Palestine).)	—
UN Framework Convention on Climate Change	1992	Environment (climate change)	193	4: (COK; VAT; NIU; PSE)	197	1 (EU)	198 (Note: On 27 February 2026, the United States notified the United Nations of its decision to withdraw from the UN Framework Convention on Climate Change, which will be effective on 27 February 2027.)	—
UN Convention to Combat Desertification	1994	Environment (desertification)	193	3: (COK; NIU; PSE)	196	1 (EU)	197	VAT
Geneva Conventions: First, Second, Third, Fourth	1949	International humanitarian law	193	3: (COK; VAT; PSE)	196	0	196 (Note: In 2015, depository state Switzerland recognized a unilateral declaration by the Polisario Front, a national liberation movement in Western Sahara, that binds it to the Geneva Conventions without acceding to them.)	NIU (Note: By its Geneva Conventions Act 1958, Niue considers New Zealand's ratification of the Geneva Conventions to cover its territory.)
Convention on the Rights of the Child	1989	Human rights	192	4: (COK; VAT; NIU; PSE)	196	0	196	USA
Convention concerning the Protection of the World Cultural and Natural Heritage	1972	Cultural and natural heritage	192	4: (COK; VAT; NIU; PSE)	196	0	196	LIE
Convention on Biological Diversity	1992	Environment (species preservation; sustainable development)	192	3: (COK; NIU; PSE)	195	1 (EU)	196	VAT, USA
Constitution of the Food and Agriculture Organization	1945	Organizational (FAO); agriculture; food	192	2: (COK; NIU)	194	1 (EU)	195	VAT, LIE, PSE
United Nations Convention against Transnational Organized Crime	2000	Organized crime; international criminal law	190	4: (COK; VAT; NIU; PSE)	194	1 (EU)	195	COG, PNG, TUV
Constitution and Convention of the International Telecommunication Union	1865/1992	Organizational (ITU); telecommunications	193	1 (VAT)	194	0	194	COK, NIU, PSE
Constitution of the World Health Organization	1946	Organizational (WHO); health	192	2: (COK; NIU)	194	0	194	VAT, LIE, PSE
Constitution of the United Nations Educational, Scientific and Cultural Organisation	1945	Organizational (UNESCO); education; science; culture	191	3: (COK; NIU; PSE)	194	0	194 (Note: On 22 July 2025, the US Department of State announced the decision of the United States of America to withdraw from UNESCO, effective on 31 December 2026.)	VAT, ISR, (Note: Israel withdrew from UNESCO on 31 December 2018.) LIE
WIPO Convention	1967	Organizational (WIPO); intellectual property	191	3: (COK; VAT; NIU)	194	0	194	PLW, PSE, SSD
Convention on the Rights of Persons with Disabilities	2006	Human rights	191	2: (COK; PSE)	193	1 (EU)	194	VAT, NIU, TJK, USA
Paris Agreement	2015	Environment (climate change)	189	4: (COK; NIU; PSE; VAT)	193	1 (EU)	194	IRN, LBY, USA, (Note: The USA withdrew from the Paris Agreement on 27 January 2026.) YEM
United Nations Charter	1945	Organizational (UN); pacific settlement of disputes	193	0	193	0	193	COK, VAT, NIU, PSE
Chemical Weapons Convention	1992	Organizational (OPCW); international humanitarian law; arms control	189	4: (COK; VAT; NIU; PSE)	193	0	193	EGY, ISR, PRK, SSD
Chicago Convention on International Civil Aviation	1944	Organizational (ICAO); air transport	192	1 (COK)	193	0	193	VAT, LIE, (Note: Switzerland made the following declaration upon ratification: "My Government has instructed me to notify you that the authorities in Switzerland have agreed with the authorities in the Principality of Liechtenstein that this Convention will be applicable to the territory of the Principality as well as to that of the Swiss Confederation, as long as the Treaty of 29 March 1923 integrating the whole territory of Liechtenstein with the Swiss customs territory will remain in force".) NIU, PSE
Vienna Convention on Diplomatic Relations	1961	Privileges and immunities; diplomatic relations	191	2: (VAT; PSE)	193	0	193	COK, NIU, PLW, SSD
Constitution of the International Criminal Police Organization	1923/1956 (Note: The International Criminal Police Commission (ICPC) was created in 1923. It became the International Criminal Police Organization (ICPO) with the new Constitution adopted in 1956.)	Organizational (Interpol); law enforcement cooperation	191	2: (PSE; VAT)	193	0	193 (Note: In addition, Aruba, Curaçao and Sint Maarten are full members of Interpol, making the total number of members 196.)	COK, (Note: The Cook Islands inquired about becoming a member in 1996. According to Interpol, this inquiry was turned down by the Secretary General of the organization because the territory didn't enjoy "full legal capacity".) NIU, PRK, TUV
United Nations Convention against Corruption	2003	International criminal law	188	4: (COK; VAT; NIU; PSE)	192	1 (EU)	193	ERI, MCO, PRK, VCT, SYR
Kyoto Protocol	1997	Environment (climate change)	189	2: (COK; NIU)	191	1 (EU)	192	AND, CAN, (Note: Ratified the treaty but has subsequently denounced it and withdrawn.) VAT, PSE, SSD, USA
UN Convention Against Illicit Traffic in Narcotic Drugs and Psychotropic Substances	1988	Drug control	187	4: (COK; VAT; NIU; PSE)	191	1 (EU)	192	GNQ, KIR, PNG, SLB, SOM, TUV
International Convention Against Doping in Sport	2005	Doping in sport	190	2: (COK; PSE)	192	0	192	AFG, GNB, LIE, NIU, VAT
Basel Convention	1992	Environmental (hazardous waste disposal)	188	2: (COK; PSE)	190	1 (EU)	191	TLS, FJI, HTI, VAT, NIU, SSD, USA
Articles of Agreement of the International Monetary Fund	1944	Organizational (IMF); international development	190	1 (UNK)	191	0	191	COK, CUB, VAT, MCO, NIU, PRK, PSE
International Convention for the Suppression of the Financing of Terrorism	1999	Terrorism	188	3: (COK; VAT; NIU)	191	0	191	BDI, TCD, ERI, PSE, SOM, TUV
Treaty on the Non-Proliferation of Nuclear Weapons	1968	Arms control	188 (Note: Not including North Korea, which ratified the treaty but subsequently denounced it. There is disagreement among the parties to the treaty whether North Korea's withdrawal was in conformity with the terms of the treaty.)	2: (VAT; PSE)	190	0	190	COK, IND, ISR, NIU, PRK, PAK, SSD
Convention for the Suppression of Unlawful Acts against the Safety of Civil Aviation	1971	Aviation; terrorism	188	2: (COK; NIU)	190	0	190	TLS, ERI, VAT, KIR, PSE, SSD, TUV
Convention on the Elimination of All Forms of Discrimination against Women	1979	Human rights	187	2: (COK; PSE)	189	0	189	VAT, IRN, PLW, NIU, SOM, SDN, TON, USA
Articles of Agreement of the International Bank for Reconstruction and Development	1944	Organizational (IBRD); international development	188	1 (UNK)	189	0	189	AND, COK, CUB, VAT, LIE, MCO, NIU, PRK, PSE
Biological Weapons Convention	1972	International humanitarian law; arms control	185	4: (COK; VAT; NIU; PSE)	189	0	189	TCD, DJI, ERI, EGY, HTI, ISR, SOM, SYR
Tokyo Convention	1969	Terrorism, air transport	186	2: (COK; NIU)	188	0	188	DMA, TLS, ERI, VAT, KIR, FSM, PSE, SSD, TUV
Constitution of the Universal Postal Union	1964	Organizational (UPU); postal	186 (Note: The UPU recognises the membership of 192 parties. From 1874 to 1964, membership in the Universal Postal Union was governed by the Treaty of Bern. On 10 July 1964, the UPU incorporated the Treaty of Bern into a new Constitution of the UPU, which is now the governing treaty that is ratified when a state joins the UPU. Included as UPU members are two "joint memberships" for dependent territories (one for the British Overseas Territories and one for the Caribbean constituent countries (Dutch: landen) of the Kingdom of the Netherlands (Aruba, Curaçao, and Sint Maarten), originally as Netherlands Antilles). Dependent territories are not permitted to ratify the UPU Constitution, but because the Treaty of Bern allowed for dependencies to join the UPU, listing these members separately as "Colonies, Protectorates, etc.", the Constitution of the Universal Postal Union grandfathered them when membership was restricted to sovereign states. However, neither the British nor the Dutch entities ratified the Treaty of Bern separate from the ratifications of the United Kingdom and the Kingdom of the Netherlands, respectively. Also included as members are three states which were party to the Treaty of Bern in 1964, and hence members of the UPU, and which have signed but never ratified the Constitution: the Dominican Republic, Honduras, and the Sudan. These states are deemed to have "tacitly ratified" the agreement due to their continued participation in the UPU.)	1 (VAT)	187	0	187	AND, DOM, HND, MHL, FSM, PLW, PSE, SDN
Constitution of the International Labour Organization	1919/1945 (Note: The Constitution of the ILO was originally part of the 1919 Treaty of Versailles. Since 1919, the Constitution has been amended a number of times, most significantly in 1945–46, when the ILO became a specialized agency of the United Nations.)	Organizational (ILO); labour	186	1 (COK)	187	0	187	AND, BHU, VAT, LIE, FSM, MCO, NIU, PRK, NRU, PSE
Convention of the World Meteorological Organization	1950	Meteorology	185	2: (COK; NIU)	187	0	187 (Note: In addition, six dependent territories or groups of territories (the "British Caribbean Territories" (joint membership), French Polynesia, Hong Kong, Macau, Curaçao and Sint Maarten (joint membership) and New Caledonia) are full members of the WMO. The article 3 of its Convention allows territories or groups of territories to become members of the WMO if they maintain their own meteorological service.)	GNQ, GRD, LIE, MHL, PLW, KNA, VCN, SMR, PSE, VAT
Worst Forms of Child Labour Convention	1999	Human rights; labour	186	1 (COK)	187	0	187	
Hague Hijacking Convention	1970	Terrorism, air transport	185	2: (COK; NIU)	187	0	187	BDI, TLS, ERI, VAT, KIR, FSM, PSE, SLB, SSD, TUV
Single Convention on Narcotic Drugs	1961	Drug control	184	2: (VAT; PSE)	186	0	186	TCD, COK, TLS, GNQ, KIR, NRU, WSM, SSD, TUV, VUT
Stockholm Convention on Persistent Organic Pollutants	2001	Environmental (persistent organic pollutants)	182	3: (COK; NIU; PSE)	185	1 (EU)	186	AND, BTN, BRN, TLS, HTI, VAT, ISR, MYS, SMR, SSD, TKM, USA
Articles of Agreement of the International Finance Corporation	1955	Organizational (IFC); international development	185	1 (UNK)	186	0	186	AND, (Note: Prior to ratifying this treaty, the state would have to ratify the Articles of Agreement of the International Bank for Reconstruction and Development, since only IBRD member states may ratify this agreement.) COK, CUB, VAT, LIE, MCO, NRU, NIU, PRK, PSE, SMR, VCT
International Plant Protection Convention	1951	Agricultural (pest protection)	182	2: (COK; NIU)	184	1 (EU)	185	AND, AGO, BRN, KIR, LIE, MHL, MCO, NRU, PSE, SMR, TLS, TKM, VAT
CITES	1973	Environmental (species preservation)	184	0	184	1 (EU)	185	COK, HTI, KIR, MHL, FSM, NIU, NRU, PRK, PSE, SSD, TLS, TUV, VAT
Protocol to Prevent, Suppress and Punish Trafficking in Persons, especially Women and Children	2000	Human rights; international criminal law (human trafficking)	183	1 (PSE)	184	1 (EU)	185	COG, COK, IRN, NIU, PRK, PNG, WSM, SLB, TON, TUV, VUT, VAT, YEM
Convention for the Safeguarding of the Intangible Cultural Heritage	2003	Cultural heritage	183	2: (COK; PSE)	185	0	185	AUS, CAN, GUY, VAT, ISR, LBR, LIE, MDV, NZL, NIU, RUS, USA
Convention on Psychotropic Substances	1971	Drug control	182	2: (VAT; PSE)	184	0	184	COK, TLS, GNQ, HTI, KIR, LBR, NRU, NIU, WSM, SLB, SSD, TUV, VUT
Convention Relating to International Exhibitions	1928	International exhibitions	181	3: (COK; UNK; PSE)	184	0	184	
WHO Framework Convention on Tobacco Control	2003	Health	180	2: (COK; NIU)	182	1 (EU)	183	
Convention establishing a Customs Co-operation Council	1950	Organizational (WCO); customs	181	2: (UNK; PSE)	183	0 (Note: An amendment allowing accession by regional organizations and customs territories has not entered into force)	183 (Note: The depositary (Government of Belgium) has registered 4 more parties, as it includes the dependent territories of Bermuda, Netherlands Antilles, Hong Kong, and Macau. However, following the dissolution of the Netherlands Antilles in 2010, only Curaçao is now listed as a party.)	
Vienna Convention on Consular Relations	1963	Privileges and immunities; diplomatic relations	181	2: (VAT; PSE)	183	0	183	
International Convention on the Elimination of All Forms of Racial Discrimination	1969	Human rights	180	2: (VAT; PSE)	182	0	182	
Convention establishing the Multilateral Investment Guarantee Agency	1985	Organizational (MIGA); international development	181	1 (UNK)	182	0	182	
Statute of the International Atomic Energy Agency	1956	Peaceful use of nuclear energy	180	2: (COK; VAT)	182	0	182	(Note: North Korea ratified the IAEA Statute in 1974, but denounced it in 1994.)
Berne Convention for the Protection of Literary and Artistic Works	1886	Intellectual property (copyright)	179	3: (COK; VAT; NIU)	182	0	182	
Forced Labour Convention	1930	Human rights; labour	180	1 (COK)	181	0	181	
Paris Convention for the Protection of Industrial Property	1883	Intellectual property	180	1 (VAT)	181	0	181	
Convention on the Prevention and Punishment of Crimes against Internationally Protected Persons, including Diplomatic Agents	1973	Anti-terrorism; privileges and immunities; diplomatic relations	177	3: (VAT; NIU; PSE)	180	0	180	
Agreement establishing the International Fund for Agricultural Development	1976	Organizational (IFAD); development	178	2: (COK; NIU)	180	0	180	
Comprehensive Nuclear-Test-Ban Treaty	1996 (not in force)	Arms control	176	3: (COK; VAT; NIU)	179	0	179 (Note: Treaty has not entered into force.)	(Note: Russia ratified the treaty, but withdrew prior to its entry into force.)
Optional Protocol to the Convention on the Rights of the Child on the Sale of Children, Child Prostitution and Child Pornography	2000	Human rights	176	2: (VAT; PSE)	178	0	178	
Protocol for the Suppression of Unlawful Acts of Violence at Airports serving International Civil Aviation	1988	aviation; terrorism	176	2: (COK; NIU)	178	0	178	
Minimum Age Convention, 1973	1973	Human rights; labour	177	0	177	0	177	
Abolition of Forced Labour Convention	1957	Human rights; labour	175	1 (COK)	176	0	176	(Note: Malaysia and Singapore ratified the Convention, but denounced it subsequently.)
International Convention against the Taking of Hostages	1979	Terrorism	175	1 (NIU)	176	0	176	
Convention on the International Maritime Organization	1948	Organizational (IMO); admiralty law; law of the sea	175	1 (COK)	176	0	176	
Convention against Torture and Other Cruel, Inhuman or Degrading Treatment or Punishment	1984	Human rights	174	2: (VAT; PSE)	176	0	176	
Discrimination (Employment and Occupation) Convention	1958	Human rights; labour	175	0	175	0	175	
Constitution of the International Organization for Migration	1953	Migration	173	2: (COK; VAT)	175	0	175 (Note: Moreover, Bahrain, Bhutan, Indonesia, Kuwait, Malaysia, Qatar, San Marino and Saudi Arabia are Observer States.)	
Articles of Agreement of the International Development Association	1960	Organizational (IDA); international development	174	1 (UNK)	175	0	175	
International Covenant on Civil and Political Rights	1966	Human rights	174	1 (PSE)	175	0	175	
Equal Remuneration Convention	1951	Human rights; labour	175	0	175	0	175	
Protocol I	1977	International humanitarian law	172	3: (COK; VAT; PSE)	175	0	175	
International Covenant on Economic, Social and Cultural Rights	1976	Human rights	173	1 (PSE)	174	0	174	
Cartagena Protocol on Biosafety	2000	Environment (species preservation; biological technology)	170	2: (NIU; PSE)	172	1 (EU)	173	
Optional Protocol on the Involvement of Children in Armed Conflict	2000	Human rights	171	2: (VAT; PSE)	173	0	173	
Convention on Wetlands of International Importance especially as Waterfowl Habitat	1971	Environment (species preservation; waterfowl; wetlands)	173	0	173	0	173	
Constitution of the United Nations Industrial Development Organization	1979	Organizational (UNIDO); international development	172	1 (PSE)	173	0	173 (Note: However, Australia, Belgium, Canada, Denmark, France, Greece, Lithuania, New Zealand, Portugal, Slovakia, the United Kingdom and the United States denounced the treaty.)	
Convention on the Recognition and Enforcement of Foreign Arbitral Awards	1958	International arbitration	169	3: (COK; VAT; PSE)	172	0	172	
United Nations Convention on the Law of the Sea	1982	law of the sea	168	3: (COK; NIU; PSE)	171	1 (EU)	172	
International Convention for the Suppression of Terrorist Bombings	1997	Terrorism	169	1 (NIU)	170	0	170	
