= Declaration on Fundamental Principles and Rights at Work =

Treaty on principles in labor law

The Declaration on Fundamental Principles and Rights at Work was adopted in 1998, at the 86th International Labour Conference and amended at the 110th Session (2022). It is a statement made by the International Labour Organization "that all Members, even if they have not ratified the Conventions in question, have an obligation arising from the very fact of membership in the Organization to respect, to promote and to realize, in good faith and in accordance with the Constitution, the principles concerning the fundamental rights which are the subject of those Conventions".

== Core conventions ==
There are ten core conventions and a protocol, which cover collective bargaining, forced labour, child labour, discrimination and Occupational Safety and Health. They require,

- freedom to join a union, bargain collectively and take action
  - Freedom of Association and Protection of the Right to Organise Convention, 1948, No 87
  - Right to Organise and Collective Bargaining Convention, 1951, No 98
- abolition of forced labour
  - Forced Labour Convention, 1930, No 29
  - Protocol of 2014 to the Forced Labour Convention, 1930
  - Abolition of Forced Labour Convention, 1957, No 105
- abolition of labour by children before the end of compulsory school
  - Minimum Age Convention, 1973, No 138
  - Worst Forms of Child Labour Convention, 1999, No 182
- no discrimination at work
  - Equal Remuneration Convention, 1951, No 100
  - Discrimination (Employment and Occupation) Convention, 1958, No 111
- a safe and healthy working environment
  - Occupational Safety and Health Convention, 1981 (No. 155)
  - Promotional Framework for Occupational Safety and Health Convention, 2006 (No. 187)

== See also ==
- Labour law
- UK labour law
