= Montreal Protocol =

1987 treaty to protect the ozone layer

The Montreal Protocol on Substances That Deplete the Ozone Layer
- Signed: 16 September 1987
- Location: Montreal
- Effective: 1 January 1989 if 11 states have ratified by then
- Condition: Ratification by 20 states
- Signatories: 46
- Ratifiers: 198 (all United Nations members, as well as the Cook Islands, Niue, the Holy See, Palestine, and the European Union)
- Depositary: Secretary-General of the United Nations
- Languages: Arabic, Chinese, English, French, Russian, and Spanish

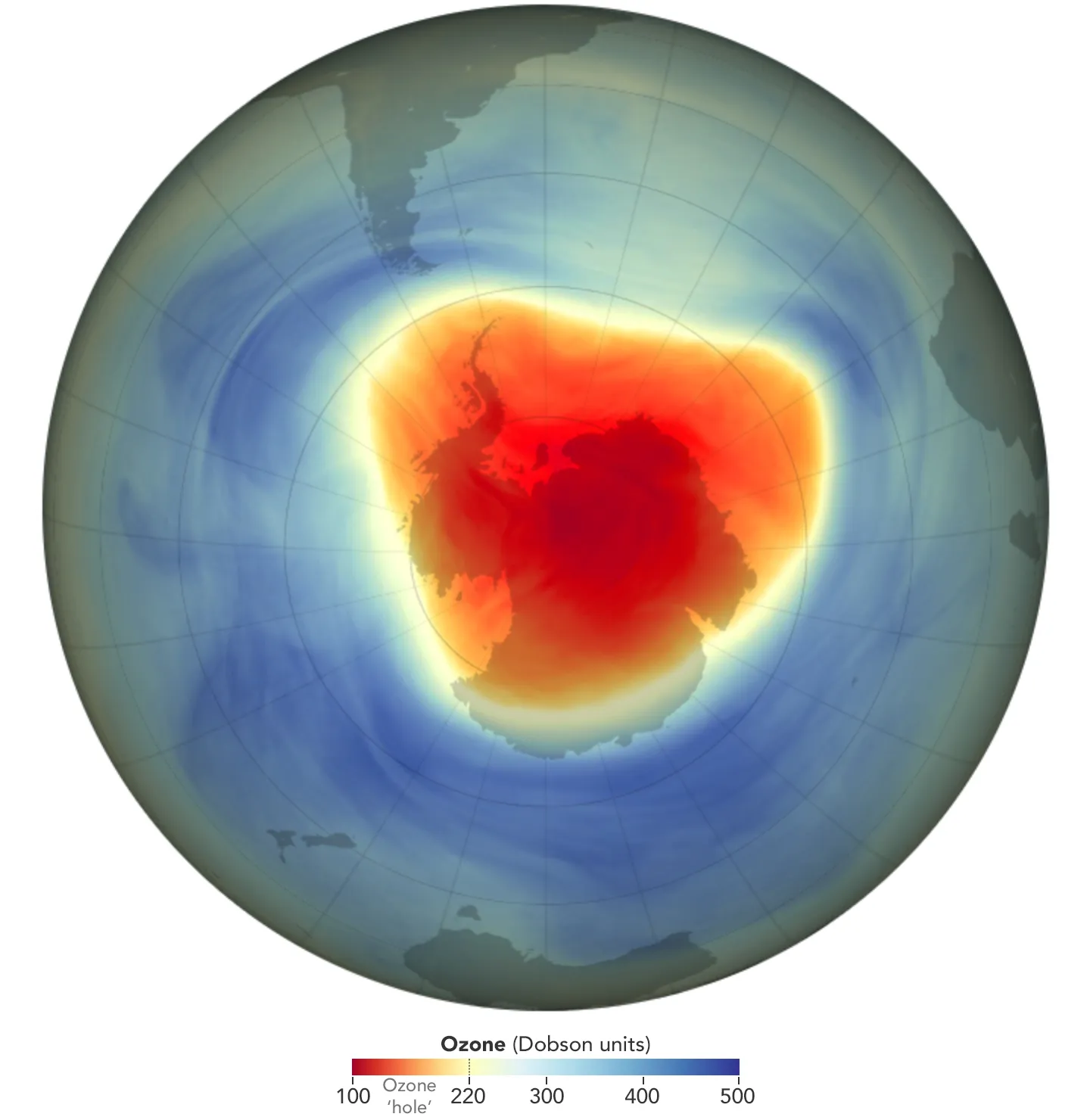
The Antarctic ozone hole (October 2024)

2012 retrospective video by NASA on the Montreal Protocol

The Montreal Protocol, officially the Montreal Protocol on Substances That Deplete the Ozone Layer, is an international treaty designed to protect the ozone layer by phasing out the production of numerous substances that are responsible for ozone depletion. It was agreed on 16 September 1987, and was entered into force on 1 January 1989. Since then, it has undergone several amendments and adjustments, with revisions agreed to in 1990 (London), 1992 (Copenhagen), 1995 (Vienna), 1997 (Montreal), 1999 (Beijing), 2007 (Montreal), 2016 (Kigali) and 2018 (Quito).

The Montreal Protocol has been ratified by 198 parties (197 states and the European Union), making it the first universally ratified treaty in United Nations history. Due to its widespread adoption and implementation, it has been hailed as an example of successful international co-operation. Former United Nations (UN) secretary-general Kofi Annan stated "perhaps the single most successful international agreement to date has been the Montreal Protocol".

As a result of the Protocol, the ozone hole over Antarctica is slowly recovering. Climate projections indicate that the ozone layer will return to 1980 levels between 2040 across much of the world and 2066 over Antarctica.

== Terms and purposes ==
The terms of the Montreal Protocol establish control measures, timelines, assessment and review, data reporting, methods of dealing with non-compliance, and measures to assist developing countries with compliance.

Timelines to phase out production and consumption of ozone-depleting substances (ODSs) covered by the Protocol are grouped by type. Specific ODS compounds belonging to each group are defined in the annexures to the Protocol.

Article 5 of the Protocol creates separate obligations for developing countries, allowing additional time to achieve compliance with the Protocol's control measures. Article 10 of the Protocol establishes a financial mechanism to help those countries achieve compliance.

=== Chlorofluorocarbons (CFCs) Phase-out Management Plan ===
The purpose of the Protocol is that each signatory states:

Recognizing that worldwide emissions of certain substances can significantly deplete and otherwise modify the ozone layer in a manner that is likely to result in adverse effects on human health and the environment. Determined to protect the ozone layer by taking precautionary measures to control equitably total global emissions of substances that deplete it with the ultimate objective of their elimination on the basis of developments in scientific knowledge

Acknowledging that special provision is required to meet the needs of developing countries

shall accept a series of stepped limits on CFC use and production, including:

- from 1991 to 1992 its levels of consumption and production of the controlled substances in Group I of Annex A do not exceed 150 percent of its calculated levels of production and consumption of those substances in 1986;
- from 1994 its calculated level of consumption and production of the controlled substances in Group I of Annex A does not exceed, annually, twenty-five percent of its calculated level of consumption and production in 1986.
- from 1996 its calculated level of consumption and production of the controlled substances in Group I of Annex A does not exceed zero.

The substances in Group I of Annex A are:

- CFCl_{3} (CFC-11)
- CF_{2}Cl_{2} (CFC-12)
- C_{2}F_{3}Cl_{3} (CFC-113)
- C_{2}F_{4}Cl_{2} (CFC-114)
- C_{2}F_{5}Cl (CFC-115)

For this group, production and consumption in non-Article 5 Parties was frozen (at a 1986 base level) on July 1, 1989, with 75% phasedown by 1994 and complete phase-out by 1996. For Article 5 Parties, consumption and production was frozen (at a base level of the average of 1995–97 amounts), followed by a 50% phasedown by 2005, an 85% phasedown by 2007, and 100% phase-out by 2010. Some chemicals were given individual attention (Carbon tetrachloride; 1,1,1-trichloroethane). The phasing-out of the less damaging HCFCs only began in 1996 and will go on until a complete phasing-out is achieved by 2030.

Production and consumption levels of Annex A - Group II Halons (halon-1211, -2404, and -1301) in non-Article 5 Parties was frozen (at a 1986 base level) on January 1, 1992, with complete phase-out by 1994. For Article 5 Parties, production and consumption were frozen (at a base level of the average of 1995–97 amounts) on January 1, 2002, followed by a 50% phasedown by 2005 and complete phase-out by 2010.

The phasedown and phase-out schedules include a few exceptions for "essential uses" where no acceptable substitutes were initially found (for example, metered dose inhalers commonly used to treat asthma and chronic obstructive pulmonary disease were previously exempt). Another exception was made for Halon fire suppression systems used in submarines and aircraft (but not in general industry).

The provisions of the Protocol include the requirement that the Parties to the Protocol base their future decisions on the current scientific, environmental, technical, and economic information that is assessed through panels drawn from the worldwide expert communities. To provide that input to the decision-making process, advances in understanding on these topics were assessed in 1989, 1991, 1994, 1998 and 2002 in a series of reports entitled Scientific assessment of ozone depletion, by the Scientific Assessment Panel (SAP).

In 1990, the Parties to the Montreal Protocol established a Technology and Economic Assessment Panel (TEAP) as a technology and economics advisory body. The TEAP provides, at the request of Parties, technical information related to alternative technologies that have made it possible to virtually eliminate the use of ODSs that harm the ozone layer. The TEAP is also tasked by the Parties every year to assess and evaluate various technical issues, including evaluating nominations for essential use exemptions for CFCs and halons, and nominations for critical use exemptions for methyl bromide. TEAP's annual reports are a basis for the Parties' informed decision-making.

Numerous reports have been published by various inter-governmental, governmental and non-governmental organizations to catalogue and assess alternatives to the ozone depleting substances, since the substances have been used in various technical sectors, like in refrigeration, air conditioning, flexible and rigid foam, fire protection, aerospace, electronics, agriculture, and laboratory measurements.

=== Hydrochlorofluorocarbons (HCFCs) Phase-out Management Plan (HPMP) ===
Under the Montreal Protocol on Substances that Deplete the Ozone Layer, especially Executive Committee (ExCom) 53/37 and ExCom 54/39, parties to this protocol agreed to set 2013 as the year to freeze the consumption and production of HCFCs for developing countries. For developed countries, reduction of HCFC consumption and production began in 2004 and 2010, respectively, with 100% reduction set for 2020. Developing countries agreed to start reducing their consumption and production of HCFCs by 2015, with 100% reduction set for 2030.

Hydrochlorofluorocarbons, commonly known as HCFCs, are a group of human-made compounds containing hydrogen, chlorine, fluorine and carbon. They are not found anywhere in nature. HCFC production began to take off after countries agreed to phase out the use of CFCs in the 1980s, which were found to be destroying the ozone layer. Like CFCs, HCFCs are used for refrigeration, aerosol propellants, foam manufacture and air conditioning. Unlike the CFCs, however, most HCFCs are broken down in the lowest part of the atmosphere and pose a much smaller risk to the ozone layer. Nevertheless, HCFCs are very potent greenhouse gases, despite their very low atmospheric concentrations, measured in parts per trillion (ppt).

The HCFCs are transitional CFCs replacements, used as refrigerants, solvents, blowing agents for plastic foam manufacture, and fire extinguishers. In terms of ozone depletion potential (ODP), in comparison to CFCs that have ODP 0.6–1.0, these HCFCs have lower ODPs (0.01–0.5). In terms of global warming potential (GWP), in comparison to CFCs that have GWP 4,680–10,720, HCFCs have lower GWPs (76–2,270).

=== Hydrofluorocarbons (HFCs) ===
On 1 January 2019, the Kigali Amendment to the Montreal Protocol came into force. Under the Kigali Amendment countries promised to reduce the use of hydrofluorocarbons (HFCs) by more than 80% over the next 30 years. By 27 December 2018, 65 countries had ratified the Amendment. As of 31 October 2024, 160 states and the European Union have ratified the Amendment.

Produced mostly in developed countries, hydrofluorocarbons (HFCs) replaced CFCs and HCFCs. HFCs pose no harm to the ozone layer because, unlike CFCs and HCFCs, they do not contain chlorine. They are, however, greenhouse gases, with a high global warming potential (GWP), comparable to that of CFCs and HCFCs. In 2009, a study calculated that a fast phasedown of high-GWP HFCs could potentially prevent the equivalent of up to 8.8 Gt CO_{2}-eq per year in emissions by 2050. A proposed phasedown of HFCs was hence projected to avoid up to 0.5C of warming by 2100 under the high-HFC growth scenario, and up to 0.35C under the low-HFC growth scenario. Recognizing the opportunity presented for fast and effective phasing down of HFCs through the Montreal Protocol, starting in 2009 the Federated States of Micronesia proposed an amendment to phase down high-GWP HFCs, with the U.S., Canada, and Mexico following with a similar proposal in 2010.

After seven years of negotiations, in October 2016 at the 28th Meeting of the Parties to the Montreal Protocol in Kigali, the Parties to the Montreal Protocol adopted the Kigali Amendment whereby the Parties agreed to phase down HFCs under the Montreal Protocol. The amendment to the Montreal Protocol commits the signatory parties to reduce their HFC production and consumption by at least 85 per cent from the annual average value in the period from 2011 to 2013. A group of developing countries including China, Brazil and South Africa are mandated to reduce their HFC use by 85 per cent of their average value in 2020–22 by the year 2045. India and some other developing countries – Iran, Iraq, Pakistan, and some oil economies like Saudi Arabia and Kuwait – will cut down their HFCs by 85 per cent of their values in 2024–26 by the year 2047.

On 17 November 2017, ahead of the 29th Meeting of the Parties of the Montreal Protocol, Sweden became the 20th Party to ratify the Kigali Amendment, pushing the Amendment over its ratification threshold ensuring that the Amendment would enter into force 1 January 2019.

=== Recent activities ===
The Parties to the Montreal Protocol, guided by the SAP, EEAP, and TEAP expert groups, continue to address ozone and climate challenges through Meetings of the Parties (MOP) to the Montreal Protocol, combined Conference of the Parties to the Vienna Convention (COP)-MOP meetings, and Open-ended Working Group (OEWG) meetings. Recent areas of focus and activities include:

- COP 12(I)/MOP 32 (2020): Replenishment of the MLF; critical-use exemptions for methyl bromide
- COP 12(II)/MOP 33 (2021): Trading of soon-to-be-obsolete technologies; energy-efficiency requirements; Parties' reporting and compliance
- OEWG 44 (2022): Study for replenishment of the MLF for 2024–26; continued emissions of CTC; African Parties' proposal to address the dumping of new but inefficient and obsolete cooling equipment in Africa
- MOP 34 (2022): illegal import of HVAC and other cooling equipment; gaps in global atmospheric monitoring of substances controlled by the Montreal Protocol; HFC-23 by-product emissions; illegal trade
- OEWG 45 (2023): illegal import and export of HVAC and other cooling equipment; stratospheric aerosol injection; HFC-23 emissions; very short-lived substances (VSLS) with climate- or ozone-damaging potential
- MOP 35 (2023): Decisions on MLF replenishment; feedstock uses of methyl bromide; import and export of prohibited cooling equipment (see entry on environmental dumping)
- OEWG 46 (2024): Feedstock uses of controlled substances; management of recovered/recycled/reclaimed halons; metered-dose inhalers with low-GWP propellants; improving access to climate-friendly cooling equipment in Article 5 Parties
- COP 13/MOP 36 (2024): Decisions on HFC-23 emissions and data reporting forms; LRM; VSLS; feedstocks; enhancing regional and global atmospheric monitoring; avoiding imports of energy-inefficient cooling products.

== History ==
In 1974, the chemists Frank Sherwood Rowland and Mario Molina at the University of California, Irvine began studying the impacts of CFCs in the Earth's atmosphere. They discovered that CFC molecules were stable enough to remain in the atmosphere until they rose to the middle of the stratosphere, where they would be broken down by ultraviolet radiation and release a chlorine atom. Rowland and Molina then proposed that these chlorine atoms might be expected to cause the breakdown of large amounts of ozone (O_{3}) in the stratosphere. In 1976, the U.S. National Academy of Sciences released a report that confirmed the scientific credibility of the ozone depletion hypothesis.

In 1982, representatives from 24 countries met in Stockholm, Sweden to decide on a "Global Framework Convention for the Protection of the Ozone Layer." The following year, a group of countries, including the United States, Canada, the Nordic Countries, and Switzerland, proposed a worldwide ban on "nonessential" uses of CFCs in spray cans.

In 1985, British Antarctic Survey scientists Joe Farman, Brian Gardiner and Jon Shanklin published results of abnormally low ozone concentrations above Halley Bay near the South Pole. They speculated that this was connected to increased levels of CFCs in the atmosphere. This unforeseen phenomenon in the Antarctic, as well as NASA's scientific images of the ozone hole played an important role in the Montreal Protocol negotiations. The impact of these studies, the metaphor 'ozone hole', and the colorful visual representation in a time lapse animation proved shocking enough for negotiators in Montreal, Canada to take the issue seriously.

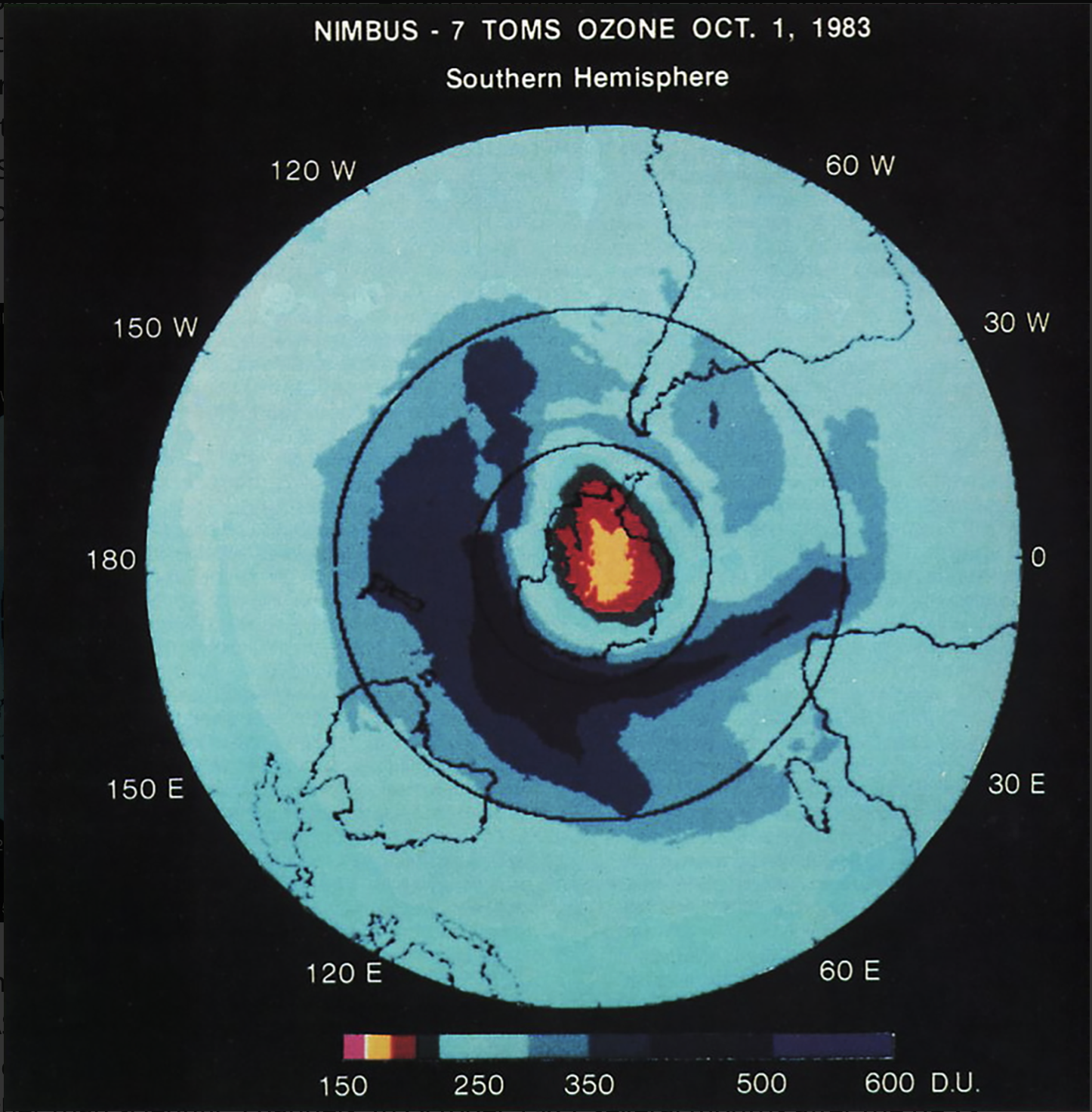
TOMS satellite map showing the total ozone above the Antarctic region. Taken on 1 October 1983 (NASA).

Parties subscribed to the Montreal Protocol by region (1987–2013)

Also in 1985, 20 nations, including most major CFC producers, signed the Vienna Convention, which established a framework for negotiating international regulations on ozone-depleting substances. From the discovery of the ozone hole, it only took 18 months to reach a binding agreement in Montreal, Canada. Mostafa Kamal Tolba, the head of the UNEP at the time, was considered the "father of the Montreal Protocol" for his role in bringing the nations together for an agreement.

In 1986, an assessment spearheaded by NASA and sponsored by the United Nations Environment Program, the World Meteorological Organization, and various other organizations concluded that continued CFC emissions at the 1980 rate would "reduce global average ozone by about 9 percent by the latter half of the century." Based on these figures, the U.S. Environmental Protection Agency estimated that in the United States alone there could be "over 150 million new cases of skin cancer among people currently alive and born by the year 2075, resulting in over 3 million deaths."

The CFC industry continued pushing back against regulation as late as 1986, when the Alliance for Responsible CFC Policy (an association representing the CFC industry founded by DuPont) was still arguing that the science was too uncertain to justify any action. In 1987, DuPont testified before the US Congress that "We believe there is no imminent crisis that demands unilateral regulation." And even in March 1988, Du Pont Chair Richard E. Heckert would write in a letter to the United States Senate, "we will not produce a product unless it can be made, used, handled and disposed of safely and consistent with appropriate safety, health and environmental quality criteria. At the moment, scientific evidence does not point to the need for dramatic CFC emission reductions. There is no available measure of the contribution of CFCs to any observed ozone change..."

In an unexpected policy change, however, the Alliance for Responsible CFC Policy issued a statement in 1986 declaring that "large future increases...in CFCs...would be unacceptable to future generations," and that it would be "inconsistent with [industry] goals...to ignore the potential for risk to future generations." Three months before the protocol negotiations began, U.S. industry announced its support for new international controls on CFCs.

== Multilateral Fund ==
The main objective of the Multilateral Fund for the Implementation of the Montreal Protocol is to assist developing country parties to the Montreal Protocol whose annual per capita consumption and production of ozone depleting substances (ODS) is less than 0.3 kg to comply with the control measures of the Protocol. Currently, 147 of the 196 Parties to the Montreal Protocol meet these criteria (they are referred to as Article 5 countries).

It embodies the principle agreed at the United Nations Conference on Environment and Development in 1992 that countries have a common but differentiated responsibility to protect and manage the global commons.

The Fund is managed by an executive committee with an equal representation of seven industrialized and seven Article 5 countries, which are elected annually by a Meeting of the Parties. The Committee reports annually to the Meeting of the Parties on its operations. The work of the Multilateral Fund on the ground in developing countries is carried out by four Implementing Agencies, which have contractual agreements with the executive committee:

- United Nations Environment Programme (UNEP), through its OzonAction Programme
- United Nations Development Programme (UNDP)
- United Nations Industrial Development Organization (UNIDO)
- World Bank

Up to 20 percent of the contributions of contributing parties can also be delivered through their bilateral agencies in the form of eligible projects and activities.

The fund is replenished on a three-year basis by the donors. Pledges amount to US$3.1 billion over the period 1991 to 2005. Funds are used, for example, to finance the conversion of existing manufacturing processes, train personnel, pay royalties and patent rights on new technologies, and establish national ozone offices.

== Parties ==
As of October 2022, all Member States of the United Nations, the Cook Islands, Niue, the Holy See, the State of Palestine as well as the European Union have ratified the original Montreal Protocol, with the State of Palestine being the last party to ratify the agreement, bringing the total to 198. 197 of those parties (with the exception of the State of Palestine) have also ratified the London, Copenhagen, Montreal, and Beijing amendments.

== Effect ==
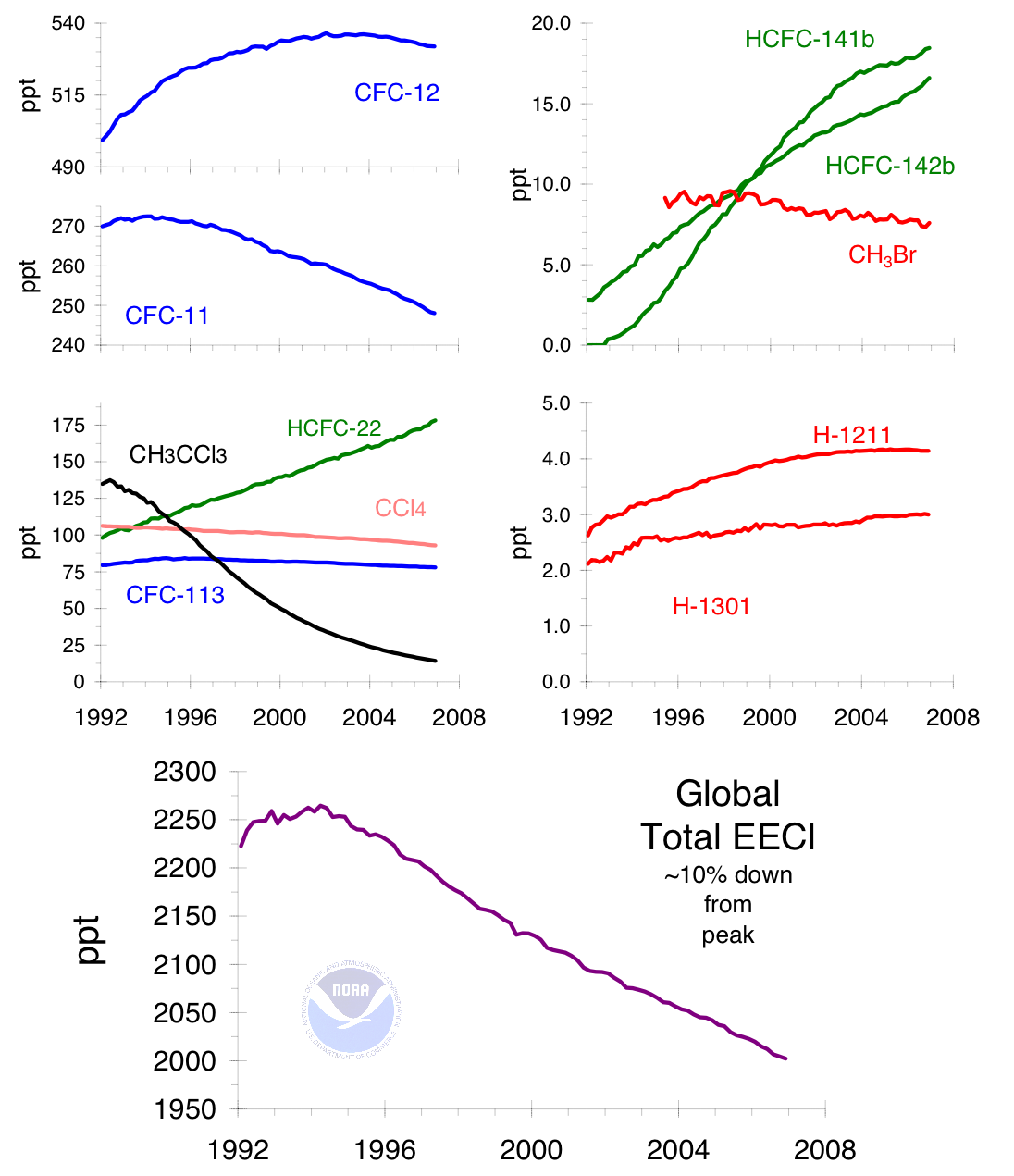
Ozone-depleting gas trends

Since the Montreal Protocol came into effect, the atmospheric concentrations of the most important chlorofluorocarbons and related chlorinated hydrocarbons have either leveled off or decreased. Halon concentrations have continued to increase, as the halons presently stored in fire extinguishers are released, but their rate of increase has slowed and their abundances are expected to begin to decline by about 2020. Also, the concentration of the HCFCs increased drastically at least partly because of many uses (e.g. used as solvents or refrigerating agents) CFCs were substituted with HCFCs. While there have been reports of attempts by individuals to circumvent the ban, e.g. by smuggling CFCs from undeveloped to developed nations, the overall level of compliance has been high. Statistical analysis from 2010 show a clear positive signal from the Montreal Protocol to the stratospheric ozone. In consequence, the Montreal Protocol has often been called the most successful international environmental agreement to date. In a 2001 report, NASA found the ozone thinning over Antarctica had remained the same thickness for the previous three years, however in 2003 the ozone hole grew to its second largest size. The 2006 scientific evaluation of the effects of the Montreal Protocol states, "The Montreal Protocol is working: There is clear evidence of a decrease in the atmospheric burden of ozone-depleting substances and some early signs of stratospheric ozone recovery." However, a more recent study seems to point to a relative increase in CFCs due to an unknown source.

The 2002 Scientific Assessment of Ozone Depletion predicted the ozone layer would return to 1980 levels by middle of the 21st century. In the 2022 assessment, this was delayed to 2066 for Antarctica, 2045 for the Arctic, and 2040 for most of the world. This is thought to be due to changes in calculation formulas as well as atmospheric changes.

Reported in 1997, significant production of CFCs occurred in Russia for sale on the black market to the EU throughout the 90s. Related US production and consumption was enabled by fraudulent reporting due to poor enforcement mechanisms. Similar illegal markets for CFCs were detected in Taiwan, Korea, and Hong Kong.

The Montreal Protocol is also expected to have effects on human health. A 2015 report by the U.S. Environmental Protection Agency estimates that the protection of the ozone layer under the Protocol will prevent over 280 million cases of skin cancer, 1.5 million skin cancer deaths, and 45 million cataracts in the United States.

However, the hydrochlorofluorocarbons, or HCFCs, and hydrofluorocarbons, or HFCs, contribute to anthropogenic global warming. On a molecule-for-molecule basis, these compounds are up to 10,000 times more potent greenhouse gases than carbon dioxide. The Montreal Protocol currently calls for a complete phase-out of HCFCs by 2030, but does not place any restriction on HFCs. Since the CFCs themselves are equally powerful greenhouse gases, the mere substitution of HFCs for CFCs does not significantly increase the rate of anthropogenic climate change, but over time a steady increase in their use could increase the danger that human activity will change the climate.

Policy experts have advocated for increased efforts to link ozone protection efforts to climate protection efforts. Policy decisions in one arena affect the costs and effectiveness of environmental improvements in the other.

With the agreement in 2016 of the Kigali Amendment that phases down production and consumption of hydrofluorocarbons (HFCs), the Montreal Protocol became both an ozone and a climate treaty because HFCs are powerful greenhouse gases.

As of November 2025, the European Union is on track to comply with HFC obligations set out in the Montreal protocol.

In comparison to other environmental treaties, effective burden-sharing and solution proposals mitigating regional conflicts of interest have been among the success factors for the ozone depletion challenge, where global regulation based on the Kyoto Protocol has failed to do so. In this case of the ozone depletion challenge, there was global regulation already being implemented before a scientific consensus was established. Also, overall public opinion was convinced of possible imminent risks.

=== Regional detections of non-compliance ===
In 2018, scientists monitoring the atmosphere following the 2010 phaseout date reported evidence of industrial production of CFC-11 beginning around 2012, likely in eastern Asia, with detrimental global effects on the ozone layer. A monitoring study then detected atmospheric releases of carbon tetrachloride from China's Shandong province beginning sometime after 2012, and accounting for a large part of emissions exceeding global estimates under the Montreal Protocol. Carbon tetrachloride is a precursor to CFC-11, however it is also associated with other industrial activities and can't be tied to CFC-11 conclusively. The study was discussed at the 30th Meeting of the Parties and China subsequently issued a report claiming that they had discovered and shut down 24 illegal production sites, 14 of which produced specifically CFC-11.

A subsequent analysis revealed a decrease in emissions of CCl₄, CFC-11, and CFC-12 from eastern China between 2018 and 2019 to levels consistent with pre-2013 measurements. However, the extra emissions produced by China as inferred by the monitoring stations were only able to explain a portion of the detected global emissions rise of CFC-11, and the authors speculate that the rest come from regions without downwind monitoring stations.

== 25th anniversary celebrations ==
The year 2012 marked the 25th anniversary of the signing of the Montreal Protocol. Accordingly, the Montreal Protocol community organized a range of celebrations at the national, regional and international levels to publicize its considerable success to date and to consider the work ahead for the future. Among its accomplishments are:

- The Montreal Protocol was the first international treaty to address a global environmental regulatory challenge;
- the first to embrace the "precautionary principle" in its design for science-based policymaking;
- the first treaty where independent experts on atmospheric science, environmental impacts, chemical technology, and economics, reported directly to parties, without edit or censorship, functioning under norms of professionalism, peer review, and respect;
- the first to provide for national differences in responsibility and financial capacity to respond by establishing a multilateral fund for technology transfer; the first MEA with stringent reporting, trade, and binding chemical phase-out obligations for both developed and developing countries; and,
- the first treaty with a financial mechanism managed democratically by an executive board with equal representation by developed and developing countries.

Within 25 years of signing, parties to the MP celebrate significant milestones. Significantly, the world has phased-out 98% of the Ozone-Depleting Substances (ODS) contained in nearly 100 hazardous chemicals worldwide; every country is in compliance with stringent obligations; and, the MP has achieved the status of the first global regime with universal ratification; even the newest member state, South Sudan, ratified in 2013. UNEP received accolades for achieving global consensus that "demonstrates the world’s commitment to ozone protection, and more broadly, to global environmental protection".

== See also ==
- Action for Climate Empowerment
- Carbon footprint
- Copenhagen Accord
- Net capacity factor
- International Day for the Preservation of the Ozone Layer
- Kyoto Protocol
- Paris Agreement
- R-134a
- Section 608
- Vienna Conference (1985)
- Fossil fuel phase-out
- Phase-out of fossil fuel vehicles
- Phase-out of gas boilers
- Plastic bans
