= C99 (disambiguation) =

C99 is a past version of the C programming language standard.

C99 or C-99 may also refer to:

== Science and technology ==
- C99, a C compiler for the TI-99/4A home computer
- C99, a fragment of the amyloid precursor protein created by beta-secretase
- C99Shell, also known as C99, is a malicious web shell

== Other uses ==
- C99, a model of Beechcraft Model 99 aircraft
- Convair C-99, a military aircraft
- Ruy Lopez (ECO code), a chess opening
- Minimum Wage Fixing Machinery (Agriculture) Convention, 1951 (ILO code)
- C99, is also known as Coalsack Nebula

== See also ==
- HMS Blake (C99), a 1945 British Royal Navy cruiser
