= Reduction of hours of work =

Reduction of hours of work may refer to:

- Six-hour day, proposed as an alternative to a four-day week
- Eight-hour day movement, a former social movement to regulate the length of a working day. The eight-hour day was first introduced by law in Spain in 1919 and later the same year ratified by 52 countries at the Hours of Work (Industry) Convention, 1919.
- Three-Day Week, introduced from 1973 to 1974 in the United Kingdom to conserve electricity
- Four-day week, a policy to reduce the working week to four days rather than the more customary five
- 35-hour workweek, a labour reform policy adopted in France in 2000
- Working time § Gradual decrease in working hours
- Work–life balance

== See also ==
- Annual leave
- Critique of work
- Effects of overtime
- Exhaustion disorder
- Job strain
- Karoshi
- Labor rights
- List of countries by average annual labor hours
- List of minimum annual leave by country
- Long weekend
- Occupational burnout
- Occupational cardiovascular disease
- Occupational stress
- Overwork
- Paid time off
- Psychosocial hazard
- Public holiday
- Reduction of Hours of Work Convention (disambiguation)
- Right to rest and leisure
