= Maternity Protection Act 1994 =

The Maternity Protection Act 1994 is an Act of the Oireachtas (Irish parliament). Under the act, a woman is protected in pregnancy in such areas as health and safety and parental leave requirements.

== Leave Requirement ==
- Entitlement to 18 weeks paid leave with the option to take a further 8 weeks unpaid leave
- Entitlement to attend doctors appointments without loss of pay

The pregnancy must be confirmed with a medical certificate from a doctor. The woman can choose her own dates but it most cover 4 weeks prior and post the birth and four weeks written notice before returning to work must also be given. The woman is entitled to return to the same job.

== See also ==
- Maternity Protection Convention, 2000
