= Social Security (Minimum Standards) Convention, 1952 =

International Labour Organization Convention

C102
- ILO Convention
- Date of adoption: June 28, 1952
- Date in force: April 27, 1955
- Classification: Social security
- Subject: Social security
- Previous: Holidays with Pay (Agriculture) Convention, 1952
- Next: Maternity Protection Convention (Revised), 1952

Social Security (Minimum Standards) Convention, 1952 is an International Labour Organization Convention on social security and protection at the contingencies that include any morbid condition, whatever its cause and pregnancy.[Article 8]

It was established in 1952, with the preamble stating:

Having decided upon the adoption of certain proposals with regard to minimum standards of social security,...

== Ratifications ==
As of December 2022, the convention has been ratified by 65 states.
