= Holidays with Pay Convention, 1936 =

International Labour Organization Convention

C52
- ILO Convention
- Date of adoption: June 24, 1936
- Date in force: September 22, 1939
- Classification: Paid Leave
- Subject: Working Time
- Previous: Reduction of Hours of Work (Public Works) Convention, 1936
- Next: Officers' Competency Certificates Convention, 1936

Holidays with Pay Convention, 1936 is an International Labour Organization Convention.

It was established in 1936, with the preamble stating:

Having decided upon the adoption of certain proposals with regard to annual holidays with pay,

== Modification ==
This convention was subsequently revised in 1970 by Convention C132 - Holidays with Pay Convention (Revised), 1970.

== Ratifications ==
The convention was ratified by 54 states. Upon the revised version being ratified by various countries, it was thereby subsequently renounced automatically by 17 of those states.
