= Promotional Framework for Occupational Safety and Health Convention, 2006 =

International Labour Organization Convention

The Promotional Framework for Occupational Safety and Health Convention, 2006 is an International Labour Organization convention concluded in 2006, which entered into force in 2009.

== Content ==
The Occupational Safety and Health Convention, ratified in 2006, is binding only on members whose accession has been registered by the Director-General of the International Labour Office but does not supersede international labour conventions and recommendations. The convention enters into force on any member within twelve months of the date of official registration of accession. The Director-General of the International Labour Office notifies all members of the International Labour Office of the fact of official registrations and draws the attention of the members of the organization to the date of entry into force of this convention. The Director-General of the International Labour Office shall comply with the Charter of the United Nations.

== Ratifications ==
As of April 2026, it has been ratified by 74 states.

Country	Date	Status
Albania	24 Apr 2014	In Force
Angola	11 June 2025	Not in force
Antigua and Barbuda	28 Jul 2021	In Force
Argentina	13 Jan 2014	In Force
Australia	29 Oct 2024	In Force
Austria	20 May 2011	In Force
Bangladesh	20 Nov 2025	Not in force
Barbados	5 Jun 2025	Not in force
Belgium	31 May 2018	In Force
Bosnia and Herzegovina	09 Mar 2010	In Force
Brunei	11 June 2024	In Force
Bulgaria	3 Apr 2024	In force
Burkina Faso	13 Oct 2016	In Force
Canada	13 Jun 2011	In Force
Chile	27 Apr 2011	In Force
Cuba	05 Aug 2008	In Force
Cyprus	14 May 2009	In Force
Czech Republic	13 Oct 2008	In Force
Denmark	28 Jan 2009	In Force
Dominican Republic	15 Sep 2015	In Force
Finland	26 Jun 2008	In Force
Ivory Coast	01 Apr 2016	In Force
Denmark]	28 Jan 2009	In Force
Dominican Republic	15 Sep 2015	In Force
Finland	26 Jun 2008	In Force
France	29 Oct 2014	In Force
Greece	30 Aug 2021	In Force
Guinea	25 Apr 2017	In Force
Iceland	01 Jun 2018	In Force
Indonesia	31 Aug 2015	In Force
Iraq	21 Dec 2015	In Force
Italy	12 Oct 2023	In Force
Japan	24 Jul 2007	In Force
Kazakhstan	03 Feb 2015	In Force
Laos	04 Jul 2022	In Force
Luxembourg	18 Mar 2021	In Force
Lesotho	15 Mari 2023	In Force
Malawi	07 Nov 2019	In Force
Malaysia	07 Jun 2012	In Force
Mauritius	19 Nov 2012	In Force
Montenegro	18 Sep 2015	In Force
Morocco	14 Jun 2019	In Force
Netherlands	4 Oct 2024	In Force
Niger	19 Feb 2009	In Force
Nigeria	08 Nov 2022	In Force
North Macedonia	03 Oct 2012	In Force
Norway	09 Nov 2015	In Force
Philippines	17 Jun 2019	In Force
Portugal	26 Sep 2017	In Force
South Korea	20 Feb 2008	In Force
Moldova	12 Feb 2010	In Force
Russian Federation	24 Feb 2011	In Force
Rwanda	29 Jun 2018	In Force
Samoa	31 May 2025	In Force
São Tomé and Príncipe	7 Jun 2024	In Force
Saudi Arabia	04 Jun 2024	In Force
Saint Lucia	5 Jun 2025	Not in force
Senegal	01 Mar 2021	In Force
Serbia	16 Sep 2009	In Force
Sierra Leone	25 Aug 2021	In Force
Singapore	11 Jun 2012	In Force
Slovakia	22 Feb 2010	In Force
Slovenia	12 Feb 2014	In Force
Somalia	08 Mar 2021	In Force
Spain	05 May 2009	In Force
Sweden	10 Jul 2008	In Force
Thailand	23 Mar 2016	In Force
Togo	30 Mar 2012	In Force
Tunisia]	22 Jul 2021	In Force
Turkey	16 Jan 2014	In Force
United Kingdom of Great Britain and Northern Ireland	29 May 2008	In Force
Uruguay	6 Jun 2025	Not in force
Uzbekistan	14 Sep 2021	In Force
Vietnam	16 May 2014	In Force
Zambia	23 Dec 2013	In Force
