= Hours of Work (Coal Mines) Convention, 1931 =

International Labour Organization Convention

C31
- ILO Convention
- Date of adoption: June 18, 1931
- Date in force: Withdrawn; May 30, 2000
- Classification: Hours of Work
- Subject: Working Time
- Previous: Hours of Work (Commerce and Offices) Convention, 1930
- Next: Protection against Accidents (Dockers) Convention (Revised), 1932

Hours of Work (Coal Mines) Convention, 1931 was an International Labour Organization Convention.

It was established in 1931:

Having decided upon the adoption of certain proposals with regard to hours of work in coal mines,...

The convention was never brought into force.

== Revision ==
The principles of the convention were subsequently revised by ILO Convention C46.

== Withdrawn ==
The convention was never brought into force, and it was withdrawn May 30, 2000 at the ILO General Conference.
