= Abolition of Penal Sanctions (Indigenous Workers) Convention, 1955 (shelved) =

International Labour Organization Convention

C104
- ILO Convention
- Date of adoption: June 21, 1955
- Date in force: June 7, 1958
- This Convention has been "shelved".
- Classification: Indigenous and Tribal Peoples
- Subject: Indigenous and Tribal Peoples
- Previous: Maternity Protection Convention (Revised), 1952
- Next: Abolition of Forced Labour Convention, 1957

Abolition of Penal Sanctions (Indigenous Workers) Convention, 1955 (shelved) is an International Labour Organization Convention.

It was established in 1955, with the preamble stating:

Having decided upon the adoption of certain proposals with regard to penal sanctions for breaches of contract of employment by indigenous workers.

== Ratifications ==
Prior to its shelving, the convention was ratified by 26 states.
