= Underground Work (Women) Convention, 1935 =

International Labour Organization Convention

C45
- ILO Convention
- Date of adoption: 21 June 1935
- Date in force: 30 May 1937
- Classification: Underground Work
- Subject: Occupational Safety and Health
- Previous: Unemployment Provision Convention, 1934 (shelved)
- Next: Hours of Work (Coal Mines) Convention (Revised), 1935

The Underground Work (Women) Convention, 1935 is an International Labour Organization Convention.

The convention banned women from doing manual labour in underground mines in most circumstances.

== Ratifications ==
As of 2023, the treaty has been ratified by 98 states. Of the ratifying states, 30 have subsequently denounced the convention.

Country	Ratification date	Status
Afghanistan	14 May 1937	ratified
Angola	4 June 1976	ratified
Argentina	14 March 1950	ratified
Australia	7 October 1953	denounced on 20 May 1988
Austria	3 July 1937	denounced on 3 April 2008
Azerbaijan	19 May 1992	ratified
Bahamas	25 May 1976	ratified
Bangladesh	22 June 1972	ratified
Belarus (as the Byelorussian SSR)	4 August 1961	ratified
Belgium	4 August 1937	denounced on 30 May 2008
Bolivia	15 November 1973	ratified
Bosnia and Herzegovina	2 June 1993	denounced on 26 March 2018
Brazil	22 September 1938	ratified
Bulgaria	29 December 1949	ratified
Cameroon	3 September 1962	ratified
Canada	16 September 1966	denounced on 19 May 1978
Chile	16 March 1946	denounced on 30 May 1997
China (as the Republic of China)	2 December 1936	ratified
Costa Rica	22 March 1960	ratified
Côte d'Ivoire	5 May 1961	ratified
Croatia	8 October 1991	ratified
Cuba	14 April 1936	ratified
Cyprus	23 September 1960	denounced on 11 July 2017
Czech Republic	1 January 1993	denounced on 24 April 2008
Djibouti	3 August 1978	denounced on 29 May 2008
Dominican Republic	12 August 1957	ratified
Ecuador	6 July 1954	ratified
Egypt	11 July 1947	ratified
Estonia	4 June 1937	denounced on 6 December 2007
Fiji	19 April 1974	ratified
Finland	3 March 1938	denounced on 19 September 1997
France	25 January 1938	denounced on 2 May 2008
Gabon	13 June 1961	ratified
Germany	15 November 1954	denounced on 25 April 2008
Ghana	20 May 1957	ratified
Greece	30 May 1936	ratified
Guatemala	7 March 1960	ratified
Guinea-Bissau	21 February 1977	ratified
Guinea	12 December 1966	ratified
Guyana	8 June 1966	ratified
Haiti	5 April 1960	ratified
Honduras	20 June 1960	ratified
Hungary	19 December 1938	denounced on 30 May 2008
India	25 March 1938	ratified
Indonesia	12 June 1950	ratified
Ireland	20 August 1936	denounced on 27 May 1988
Italy	22 October 1952	denounced on 29 May 2008
Japan	11 June 1956	ratified
Kenya	13 January 1964	ratified
Kyrgyzstan	31 March 1992	ratified
Lebanon	26 July 1962	ratified
Lesotho	31 October 1966	ratified
Luxembourg	3 March 1958	denounced on 29 April 1988
Malawi	22 March 1965	ratified
Malaysia (as the Federation of Malaya)	11 November 1957	ratified
Malta	9 June 1988	denounced on 29 May 2008
Mexico	21 February 1938	ratified
Montenegro	3 June 2006	ratified
Morocco	20 September 1956	ratified
Netherlands	20 February 1937	denounced on 29 April 1998
New Zealand	29 March 1938	denounced on 23 June 1987
Nicaragua	1 March 1976	ratified
Nigeria	17 October 1960	ratified
North Macedonia	17 November 1991	ratified
Pakistan	25 March 1938	ratified
Panama	16 February 1959	ratified
Papua New Guinea	1 May 1976	ratified
Peru	8 November 1945	denounced on 9 June 1997
Poland	15 June 1957	denounced on 29 May 2008
Portugal	18 October 1937	ratified
Russian Federation (as the Soviet Union)	4 May 1961	ratified
Saudi Arabia	15 June 1978	ratified
Serbia (as the Federal Republic of Yugoslavia)	24 November 2000	ratified
Sierra Leone	13 June 1961	ratified
Singapore	25 October 1965	ratified
Slovakia	1 January 1993	denounced on 20 February 2008
Slovenia	29 May 1992	denounced on 18 March 2008
Solomon Islands	6 August 1985	ratified
Somalia	18 November 1960	ratified
South Africa	25 June 1936	ratified
Spain	24 June 1958	denounced
Sri Lanka	20 December 1950	ratified
Swaziland	5 June 1981	ratified
Sweden	11 July 1936	denounced on 15 June 1967
Switzerland	23 May 1940	ratified
Syrian Arab Republic	26 July 1960	ratified
Tajikistan	26 November 1993	ratified
Tanzania (as Tanganyika)	30 January 1962	ratified
Tunisia	15 May 1957	ratified
Turkey	21 April 1938	ratified
Uganda	4 June 1963	ratified
Ukraine (as the Ukrainian SSR)	4 August 1961	ratified
United Kingdom	18 July 1936	denounced on 26 May 1988
Uruguay	18 March 1954	denounced on 26 May 1978
Bolivarian Republic of Venezuela	20 November 1944	ratified
Viet Nam	3 October 1994	ratified
Zambia	2 December 1964	denounced on 3 March 1998
Zimbabwe	6 June 1980	denounced on 30 May 2008

== See also ==
- Conventions Concerning Employment of Women During the Night
