= List of countries by average annual labor hours =

The average length of working time in different countries depends on a number of economic, social and societal factors. Another important factor is the extent to which part-time work is widespread, which is less common in developing countries. In 2017, the Southeast Asian state of Cambodia had the longest average working hours worldwide among 66 countries studied. Here, the working time per worker was around 2,456 hours per year, which is just under 47 hours per week. In Germany, on the other hand, it was just under 1,354 hours per year (26 per week and 3.7 per day), which was the lowest of all the countries studied.

In most countries, the weekly working hours are decreasing with increasing prosperity and higher productivity. In Germany, for example, the average weekly working time of a person not employed in agriculture and working full-time fell by almost 40 percent between 1870 and 2010. In developed countries, the average working time is therefore usually significantly shorter than in developing countries. However, there are exceptions. These include countries such as South Korea and Singapore which still have comparable long working hours despite high incomes.

== Our World in Data ==
The following list is the average annual working time per employed person (men and women) in hours. Data is not available for all countries of the world.

Average annual labor hours
Country	Working hours	
Country	Per worker (2023)	Per person employed (2017)
Sudan	2,658	
United Arab Emirates	2,514	
Jordan	2,483	
Pakistan	2,471	2,096.14
Colombia	2,471	1,997.75
Qatar	2,435	
Lebanon	2,412	
Cambodia	2,389	2,455.55
Bangladesh	2,383	2,232.35
India	2,383	2,117.01
Egypt	2,369	
Burkina Faso	2,356	
Senegal	2,335	
China	2,328	2,174.35
Kuwait	2,318	
Zimbabwe	2,311	
Malaysia	2,308	2,238.27
Tunisia	2,288	
Singapore	2,283	2,255.73
Oman	2,266	
Iran	2,246	2,437.86
Mali	2,243	
Hong Kong	2,240	
Algeria	2,232	
Zambia	2,200	
Myanmar	2,197	
Cameroon	2,181	
South Africa	2,181	2,209.09
Thailand	2,177	2,185.45
Costa Rica	2,177	2,212.38
Gabon	2,174	
Morocco	2,174	
Vietnam	2,160	2,169.59
Albania	2,152	
Guatemala	2,151	
Peru	2,143	1,932.46
Mexico	2,137	2,255.00
Tanzania	2,129	
Uganda	2,128	
Saudi Arabia	2,125	
Paraguay	2,123	
Bosnia and Herzegovina	2,122	
Angola	2,115	
Ivory Coast	2,103	
Uzbekistan	2,099	
Philippines	2,096	2,148.56
Russia	2,087	1,974.00
Dominican Republic	2,072	
Nigeria	2,062	1,827.24
Sri Lanka	2,053	1,923.94
Bosnia and Herzegovina	2,052	
Ukraine	2,045	
Kenya	2,035	
Taiwan	2,032	1,990.32
South Korea	1,980	2,063.33
Malta	1,915	2,040.03
Poland	2,023	2,028.50
Indonesia	2,020	2,024.29
Greece	2,036	2,016.90
Chile	1,914	1,974.00
Hungary	1,725	1,937.33
Israel	1,901	1,920.61
Latvia	1,865	1,874.60
Portugal	1,865	1,863.17
Estonia	1,797	1,856.68
Lithuania	1,886	1,844.02
Croatia	1,831	1,834.93
Turkey	1,832	1,832.00
Romania	1,792	1,806.00
Cyprus	1,805	1,783.52
Czech Republic	1,788	1,776.16
United States	1,765	1,765.00
New Zealand	1,779	1,752.00
Ireland	1,772	1,745.68
Slovakia	1,695	1,745.23
Japan	1,691	1,738.36
Austria	1,611	1,731.49
Italy	1,718	1,722.61
Brazil	1,708	1,709.49
Ecuador	1,552	1,701.36
Canada	1,689	1,696.46
Argentina	1,609	1,691.54
Spain	1,686	1,686.50
United Kingdom	1,668	1,670.27
Finland	1,591	1,659.28
Slovenia	1,593	1,655.09
Bulgaria	1,645	1,643.55
Australia	1,727	1,613.05
Sweden	1,605	1,609.29
Switzerland	1,557	1,589.68
Uruguay	1,533	1,552.35
Belgium	1,586	1,544.27
Luxembourg	1,506	1,518.86
France	1,505	1,514.14
Iceland	1,454	1,493.37
Netherlands	1,440	1,430.02
Norway	1,384	1,417.47
Denmark	1,381	1,400.38
Germany	1,386	1,353.89

== OECD list ==
The following list is the average annual hours worked by participants in the labor force of the OECD (Organisation for Economic Co-operation and Development) member states. As of 2022, Colombia, Mexico, and Costa Rica ranked the highest number of hours worked per year. Greece ranked the highest In EU with 1886 average hours per year, while Germany ranked the lowest with 1340 average hours worked respectively. Japan and Australia ranked lowest amongst non-European countries.

Average labor hours per worker in OECD countries
Code	Country	2025	2020	2015	2010	2005	2000	1990	1980	1970	1960	1950
AUS	Australia	1,633	1,683	1,751	1,778	1,808	1,852	1,853	–	–	–	–
AUT	Austria	1,442	1,400	1,495	1,552	1,632	1,675	–	–	–	–	–
BEL	Belgium	1,586	1,481	1,575	1,574	1,578	1,589	1,663	1,707	1,883	–	–
BGR	Bulgaria	1,641	1,609	1,644	1,645	1,659	1,640	–	–	–	–	–
CAN	Canada	1,687	1,644	1,712	1,715	1,745	1,787	1,797	1,827	1,925	–	–
CHL	Chile	1,912	1,825	1,994	2,070	2,157	2,263	2,422	–	–	–	–
COL	Colombia	–	–	2,194	–	–	–	–	–	–	–	–
CRI	Costa Rica	2,183	1,913	2,148	2,243	2,352	2,362	2,358	–	–	–	–
HRV	Croatia	1,946	1,834	1,827	1,942	1,926	1,922	–	–	–	–	–
CYP	Cyprus	1,851	1,698	1,824	1,845	1,847	1,926	–	–	–	–	–
CZE	Czech Republic	1,824	1,705	1,751	1,799	1,803	1,900	–	–	–	–	–
DNK	Denmark	1,369	1,346	1,407	1,422	1,451	1,466	1,441	1,577	1,845	–	–
EST	Estonia	1,610	1,654	1,763	1,785	1,913	1,884	–	–	–	–	–
EU27	European Union	–	1,513	1,607	1,632	1,652	1,678	–	–	–	–	–
FIN	Finland	1,492	1,531	1,555	1,585	1,613	1,650	1,671	1,732	1,918	1,967	–
FRA	France	1,498	1,402	1,519	1,540	1,532	1,558	1,645	1,806	1,993	2,188	2,351
DEU	Germany	1,332	1,332	1,401	1,426	1,432	1,466	–	–	–	–	–
GRC	Greece	1,874	1,728	1,935	1,931	2,025	1,998	1,976	–	–	–	–
HUN	Hungary	1,671	1,660	1,746	1,766	1,834	1,932	2,082	2,348	–	–	–
ISL	Iceland	1,421	1,435	1,511	1,528	1,637	1,696	1,665	1,688	1,954	–	–
IRL	Ireland	1,639	1,746	1,771	1,721	1,883	1,933	2,081	2,123	2,335	–	–
ISR	Israel	1,870	1,783	1,895	1,957	1,966	2,033	1,904	–	–	–	–
ITA	Italy	1,716	1,559	1,718	1,777	1,811	1,850	–	–	–	–	–
JPN	Japan	1,598	1,598	1,719	1,733	1,775	1,821	2,031	2,121	2,243	–	–
KOR	South Korea	1,833	1,908	2,083	2,163	–	–	–	–	–	–	–
LVA	Latvia	1,588	1,577	1,663	1,692	1,666	1,728	–	–	–	–	–
LTU	Lithuania	1,673	1,595	1,673	1,697	1,659	1,630	–	–	–	–	–
LUX	Luxembourg	1,459	1,427	1,514	1,517	1,550	1,602	–	–	–	–	–
MLT	Malta	1,844	1,827	1,955	2,136	2,167	2,246	–	–	–	–	–
MEX	Mexico	2,205	2,124	2,140	2,150	2,105	2,174	–	–	–	–	–
NLD	Netherlands	1,436	1,399	1,426	1,420	1,434	1,464	1,454	1,556	1,809	–	–
NZL	New Zealand	1,723	1,739	1,753	1,755	1,815	1,836	1,809	–	–	–	–
NOR	Norway	1,386	1,369	1,392	1,395	1,406	1,457	1,503	1,580	1,835	–	–
OECD	OECD	1,736	1,687	1,764	1,772	1,793	1,825	1,860	1,893	1,966	–	–
POL	Poland	1,776	1,766	1,862	1,831	1,855	1,869	–	–	–	–	–
PRT	Portugal	1,764	1,613	1,732	1,746	1,750	1,770	1,806	1,849	1,963	–	–
ROU	Romania	1,836	1,795	1,786	1,841	1,877	1,853	–	–	–	–	–
RUS	Russia	–	1,874	1,978	1,976	1,989	1,982	–	–	–	–	–
SVK	Slovakia	1,619	1,572	1,754	1,805	1,769	1,816	–	–	–	–	–
SVN	Slovenia	1,599	1,515	1,687	1,680	1,697	1,710	–	–	–	–	–
ESP	Spain	1,633	1,577	1,694	1,706	1,724	1,753	1,763	1,936	–	–	–
SWE	Sweden	1,421	1,424	1,466	1,484	1,453	1,486	1,423	1,382	1,565	1,718	1,824
CHE	Switzerland	1,512	1,495	1,577	1,611	1,690	1,713	–	–	–	–	–
TUR	Turkey	–	–	1,811	1,877	1,936	1,937	1,866	1,957	2,086	–	–
GBR	United Kingdom	1,533	1,367	1,525	1,507	1,544	1,558	1,618	1,619	1,775	–	–
USA	United States	1,800	1,767	1,783	1,772	1,794	1,832	1,833	1,816	1,907	1,952	1,968

== See also ==
- Gross national income
- List of countries by distribution of wealth
- List of countries by GDP (nominal) per capita
- List of countries by GDP (PPP) per capita
- List of countries by GDP (PPP)
- List of countries by Human Development Index
- List of countries by income equality
- National wealth
- Reduction of hours of work
