= Forty-Hour Week Convention, 1935 =

International Labour Organization Convention

C47
- ILO Convention
- Date of adoption: June 22, 1935
- Date in force: May 23, 1957
- Classification: Hours of Work
- Subject: Working Time
- Previous: Hours of Work (Coal Mines) Convention (Revised), 1935
- Next: Maintenance of Migrants' Pension Rights Convention, 1935 (shelved)

Forty-Hour Week Convention, 1935 is an International Labour Organization Convention.

It was established in 1935, with the preamble stating:

Considering that in pursuance of the Resolutions adopted by the Eighteenth and Nineteenth Sessions of the International Labour Conference it is necessary that a continuous effort should be made to reduce hours of work in all forms of employment to such extent as is possible;...

== Ratifications ==
As of 2023, the convention has been ratified by 15 states.

Country	Date	Status
Australia	1970.10.22	ratified
Azerbaijan	1992.05.19	ratified
Belarus (as the Byelorussian SSR)	1956.08.21	ratified
Finland	1989.11.23	ratified
Kyrgyzstan	1992.03.31	ratified
Lithuania	1994.09.26	ratified
Moldova	1997.12.09	ratified
New Zealand	1938.03.29	ratified
Norway	1979.03.13	ratified
Russian Federation (as the Soviet Union)	1956.06.23	ratified
South Korea	2011.11.07	ratified
Sweden	1982.08.11	ratified
Tajikistan	1993.11.26	ratified
Ukraine (as the Ukrainian SSR)	1956.08.10	ratified
Uzbekistan	1992.07.13	ratified
