= Recruiting of Indigenous Workers Convention, 1936 =

International Labour Organization Convention

Recruiting of Indigenous Workers Convention, 1936 (shelved)
C50
- ILO Convention
- Date of adoption: June 20, 1936
- Date in force: September 8, 1939
- This Convention has been "shelved".
- Classification: Indigenous and Tribal Peoples
- Subject: Indigenous and Tribal Peoples
- Previous: Reduction of Hours of Work (Glass-Bottle Works) Convention, 1935 (shelved)
- Next: Reduction of Hours of Work (Public Works) Convention, 1936

Recruiting of Indigenous Workers Convention, 1936 is a shelved International Labour Organization Convention.

It was established in 1936, with the preamble stating:

Having decided upon the adoption of certain proposals with regard to the regulation of certain special systems of recruiting workers,...

== Ratifications ==
Prior to it being shelved in 2018, the convention was ratified by 33 states.
