= Unemployment Convention, 1919 =

International Labour Organization convention

C2
- ILO Convention
- Date of adoption: 28 November 1919
- Date in force: 14 July 1921
- Classification: Unemployment
- Subject: Employment policy and Promotion
- Previous: Hours of Work (Industry) Convention, 1919
- Next: Maternity Protection Convention, 1919

Unemployment Convention, 1919 is an International Labour Organization Convention.

It was established in 1919:

Having decided upon the adoption of certain proposals with regard to the "question of preventing or providing against unemployment",...

== Ratifications ==
As of 2013, the convention had been ratified by 57 states. Of the ratifying states, three have subsequently denounced the treaty.

Country	Date	Notes
Argentina	30 November 1933	
Australia	15 June 1972	
Austria	12 June 1924	
Belgium	25 August 1930	
Bosnia and Herzegovina	2 June 1993	
Bulgaria	14 February 1922	denounced 20 July 1960
Central African Republic	9 June 1964	
Chile	31 May 1933	
Colombia	20 June 1933	
Cyprus	8 October 1965	
Denmark	13 October 1921	
Djibouti	3 August 1978	
Ecuador	5 February 1962	
Egypt	3 July 1954	
Estonia	20 December 1922	
Ethiopia	11 June 1966	
Finland	19 October 1921	
France	25 August 1925	
Germany	6 June 1925	
Greece	19 November 1920	
Guyana	8 June 1966	
Hungary	1 March 1928	
Iceland	17 February 1958	
India	14 July 1921	denounced 16 April 1938
Ireland	4 September 1925	
Italy	10 April 1923	
Japan	23 November 1922	
Kenya	13 January 1964	
Luxembourg	16 April 1928	
Malta	4 January 1965	
Mauritius	2 December 1969	
Montenegro	3 June 2006	
Morocco	14 October 1960	
Myanmar	14 July 1921	
Netherlands	6 February 1932	
New Zealand	29 March 1938	
Nicaragua	12 April 1934	
North Macedonia	17 November 1991	
Norway	23 November 1921	
Papua New Guinea	1 May 1976	
Poland	21 June 1924	
Romania	13 June 1921	
Serbia	24 November 2000	ratified as Serbia and Montenegro
Seychelles	6 February 1978	
Slovenia	29 May 1992	
South Africa	20 February 1924	
Spain	4 July 1923	
South Korea	7 November 2011	
Sudan	18 June 1957	
Sweden	27 September 1921	
Switzerland	9 October 1922	
Syrian Arab Republic	26 July 1960	As the United Arab Republic
Turkey	14 July 1950	
Ukraine	16 May 1994	
United Kingdom	14 July 1921	
Uruguay	6 June 1933	denounced 11 November 1982
Bolivarian Republic of Venezuela	20 November 1944	
