= Maintenance of Social Security Rights Convention, 1982 =

International Labour Organization Convention

C157
- ILO Convention
- Date of adoption: June 21, 1982
- Date in force: September 11, 1986
- Classification: Social Security
- Subject: Social Security
- Previous: Workers with Family Responsibilities Convention, 1981
- Next: Termination of Employment Convention, 1982

Maintenance of Social Security Rights Convention, 1982 is an International Labour Organization Convention.

It was established in 1982, with the preamble stating:

Having decided upon the adoption of certain proposals with regard to maintenance of migrant workers' rights in social security (revision of Convention No. 48),...

== Ratifications ==
As of 2024, the convention has been ratified by four states.

Country	Date
Congo	26 October 2023
Kyrgyzstan	10 September 2008
Philippines	26 April 1994
Spain	11 September 1985
Sweden	18 April 1984
