= UNEP OzonAction =

United Nations environmental organization

- Formation: 1991
- Type: UNEP Branch
- Legal status: Organization
- Purpose: Capacity-Building
- Headquarters: Paris, France
- Location: Nairobi (Kenya), Bangkok (Thailand), Panama City (Panama), Manama (Bahrain)
- Region served: Worldwide
- Head of Branch: James S. Curlin.
- Parent organization: United Nations
- Website: UNEP OzonAction

OzonAction is a branch of the United Nations Environment Programme (UNEP) which has its main office in Paris, and is part of UNEP's Division of Technology, Industry and Economics (DTIE). Created in 1991, today it has staff located in five regional offices of UNEP, namely in Africa (Nairobi, Kenya), Asia & the Pacific (Bangkok, Thailand), Latin America and the Caribbean (Panama City, Panama), and West Asia (Manama, Bahrain).

Rajendra Shende, the Head of the Branch since 1992, retired on 31 July 2011. James S. Curlin acted as Interim Head of Branch from 1 August 2011 until 17 December 2012. Shamila Nair-Bedouelle served as Head of Branch from 18 December 2012 until 1 April 2019. James S. Curlin was nominated head of the branch.

UNEP OzonAction assists developing countries and countries with economies in transition (CEITs) to achieve and sustain their compliance with the Montreal Protocol on Substances that Deplete the Ozone Layer, and make informed decisions on alternative technologies and ozone-friendly policies.

UNEP OzonAction has implemented over 1,000 projects and services that have benefited more than 100 developing countries. It has also assisted 17 CEITs and provided further services that have served another 40 countries.

In order to help developing countries comply with the Montreal Protocol, the Multilateral Fund for the Implementation of the Montreal Protocol was set up. The Fund's "main objective is to assist developing country parties to the Montreal Protocol whose annual per capita consumption and production of ozone-depleting substances is less than 0.3 kg to comply with the control measures of the Protocol".

UNEP's OzonAction branch is one of the Fund's implementing agencies, along with others, such as UNIDO, UNDP and the World Bank.
