= Equal Remuneration Convention =

International Labour Organization Convention

Equal Remuneration Convention, 1951
C100
- ILO Convention
- Date of adoption: 29 June 1951
- Date in force: 23 May 1953
- Classification: Equal Remuneration; Women
- Subject: Equality of Opportunity and Treatment
- Previous: Minimum Wage Fixing Machinery (Agriculture) Convention, 1951
- Next: Holidays with Pay (Agriculture) Convention, 1952

The Convention concerning Equal Remuneration for Men and Women Workers for Work of Equal Value, or Equal Remuneration Convention is the 100th International Labour Organization Convention and the principal one aimed at equal remuneration for work of equal value for men and women. States parties may accomplish this through legislation, introduction of a system for wage determination and/or collective bargaining agreements. It is one of 8 ILO fundamental conventions.

== Non-ratifiers ==
Party Non Party Convention not applied (dependent territory) Non ILO-member

As of October 2022, the convention had been ratified by 174 out of 187 ILO member states. ILO member states that have not ratified the convention are:

- Bahrain
- Brunei
- Cook Islands
- Kuwait
- Marshall Islands
- Myanmar
- Oman
- Palau
- Qatar
- Somalia
- Tonga
- Tuvalu
- United States

The convention has been extended by France to cover French Guiana, Guadeloupe, Martinique, and Réunion. New Zealand has extended the convention to Tokelau. It has not been extended to Aruba, Curaçao, Sint Maarten, or the Caribbean Netherlands within the Kingdom of the Netherlands.

== See also ==
- Discrimination (Employment and Occupation) Convention
