= Termination of Employment Convention, 1982 =

International Labour Organization Convention

C158
- ILO Convention
- Date of adoption: June 22, 1982
- Date in force: November 23, 1985
- Classification: Termination of Employment - Dismissal
- Subject: Employment security
- Previous: Maintenance of Social Security Rights Convention, 1982
- Next: Vocational Rehabilitation and Employment (Disabled Persons) Convention, 1983

Termination of Employment Convention, 1982 is an International Labour Organization Convention. Its purpose is to coordinate minimum levels of job security in the laws of ILO member states.

== Contents ==
- art 2, establishes the scope and says short fixed term, probationary or casual workers may be excluded
- art 3, defines termination as at the initiative of the employer
- art 4, says the employer must have a valid reason for termination based on "the capacity or conduct of the worker or based on the operational requirements of the undertaking, establishment or service"
- art 5, prohibits membership of a union, being a representative, seeking to assert a working right, or any discrimination based reason as becoming a valid reason.
- art 6, temporary absence or sickness is not a reason
- art 7, requires a minimum procedure for any disciplinary based dismissal where a worker has a chance to defend himself or herself
- arts 8–10, require a procedure where a worker can appeal against a termination to an impartial authority
- art 11, requires a reasonable period of notice before termination
- art 12, requires redundancy or severance pay for income protection
- art 13, requires consultation of worker representatives before collective redundancies

== Ratifications ==
As of 2022, 36 states have ratified the convention. One of these states—Brazil—has subsequently denounced the treaty.

Country	Date	Status
Antigua and Barbuda	16/09/2002	ratified
Australia	26/02/1993	ratified
Bosnia and Herzegovina	02/06/1993	ratified
Brazil	05/01/1995	denounced on 20/11/1996
Cameroon	13/05/1988	ratified
Central African Republic	05/06/2006	ratified
Democratic Republic of the Congo	03/04/1987	ratified
Cyprus	05/07/1985	ratified
Ethiopia	28/01/1991	ratified
Finland	30/06/1992	ratified
France	16/03/1990	ratified
Gabon	06/12/1988	ratified
Latvia	25/08/1994	ratified
Lesotho	14/06/2001	ratified
Luxembourg	21/03/2001	ratified
Malawi	01/10/1986	ratified
Republic of Moldova	14/02/1997	ratified
Montenegro	03/06/2006	ratified
Morocco	07/10/1993	ratified
Namibia	28/06/1996	ratified
Niger	05/06/1985	ratified
North Macedonia	17/11/1991	ratified
Papua New Guinea	02/06/2000	ratified
Portugal	27/11/1995	ratified
Saint Lucia	06/12/2000	ratified
Serbia	24/11/2000	ratified
Slovakia	22/02/2010	ratified
Slovenia	29/05/1992	ratified
Spain	26/04/1985	ratified
Sweden	20/06/1983	ratified
Turkey	04/01/1995	ratified
Uganda	18/07/1990	ratified
Ukraine	16/05/1994	ratified
Bolivarian Republic of Venezuela	06/05/1985	ratified
Yemen	13/03/1989	ratified
Zambia	09/02/1990	ratified

== See also ==
- Labour law
- Unfair dismissal
- Work council
- UK labour law
