= Holidays with Pay (Agriculture) Convention, 1952 =

International Labour Organization Convention

C101
- ILO Convention
- Date of adoption: June 26, 1952
- Date in force: July 24, 1954
- Classification: Paid Leave
- Subject: Working Time
- Previous: Equal Remuneration Convention, 1951
- Next: Social Security (Minimum Standards) Convention, 1952

Holidays with Pay (Agriculture) Convention, 1952 is an International Labour Organization Convention.

It was established in 1952, with the preamble stating:

Having decided upon the adoption of certain proposals with regard to holidays with pay in agriculture,...

== Revision ==
The principles contained in the convention were subsequently revised and included in the ILO Convention C132, Holidays with Pay Convention (Revised), 1970.

== Ratifications ==
As of 2013, the convention had been ratified by 46 states. Of the ratifying states, 12 had denounced the treaty by an automatic process which denounces the 1952 convention when the state ratifies a superseding treaty.
