= Vienna Convention for the Protection of the Ozone Layer =

Environmental protocol

- Signed: 22 March 1985
- Location: Vienna, Austria
- Effective: 22 September 1988
- Condition: ratification by 20 states
- Signatories: 28
- Ratifiers: 198
- Depositary: Secretary-General of the United Nations
- Languages: Arabic, Chinese, English, French, Russian and Spanish

The Vienna Convention for the Protection of the Ozone Layer is a multilateral environmental agreement signed in 1985 that provided frameworks for international reductions in the production of chlorofluorocarbons due to their contribution to the destruction of the ozone layer, resulting in an increased threat of skin cancer.

== Background ==
During the 1970s, research indicated that man-made chlorofluorocarbons (CFCs) reduce and convert ozone molecules in the atmosphere. CFCs are stable molecules composed of carbon, fluorine, and chlorine that were used prominently in products such as refrigerators. The threats associated with reduced ozone pushed the issue to the forefront of global climate issues and gained promotion through organizations such as the World Meteorological Organization and the United Nations. The Vienna Convention was agreed upon at the Vienna Conference of 1985 and entered into force in 1988. The Vienna Convention provided the framework necessary to create regulatory measures in the form of the Montreal Protocol.

In terms of universality, it is one of the most successful treaties of all time, having been ratified by 198 states (all United Nations members as well as the Holy See, the State of Palestine, Niue and the Cook Islands) as well as the European Union. While not a binding agreement, it acts as a framework for the international efforts to protect the ozone layer; however, it does not include legally binding reduction goals for the use of CFCs, the main chemical agents causing ozone depletion.

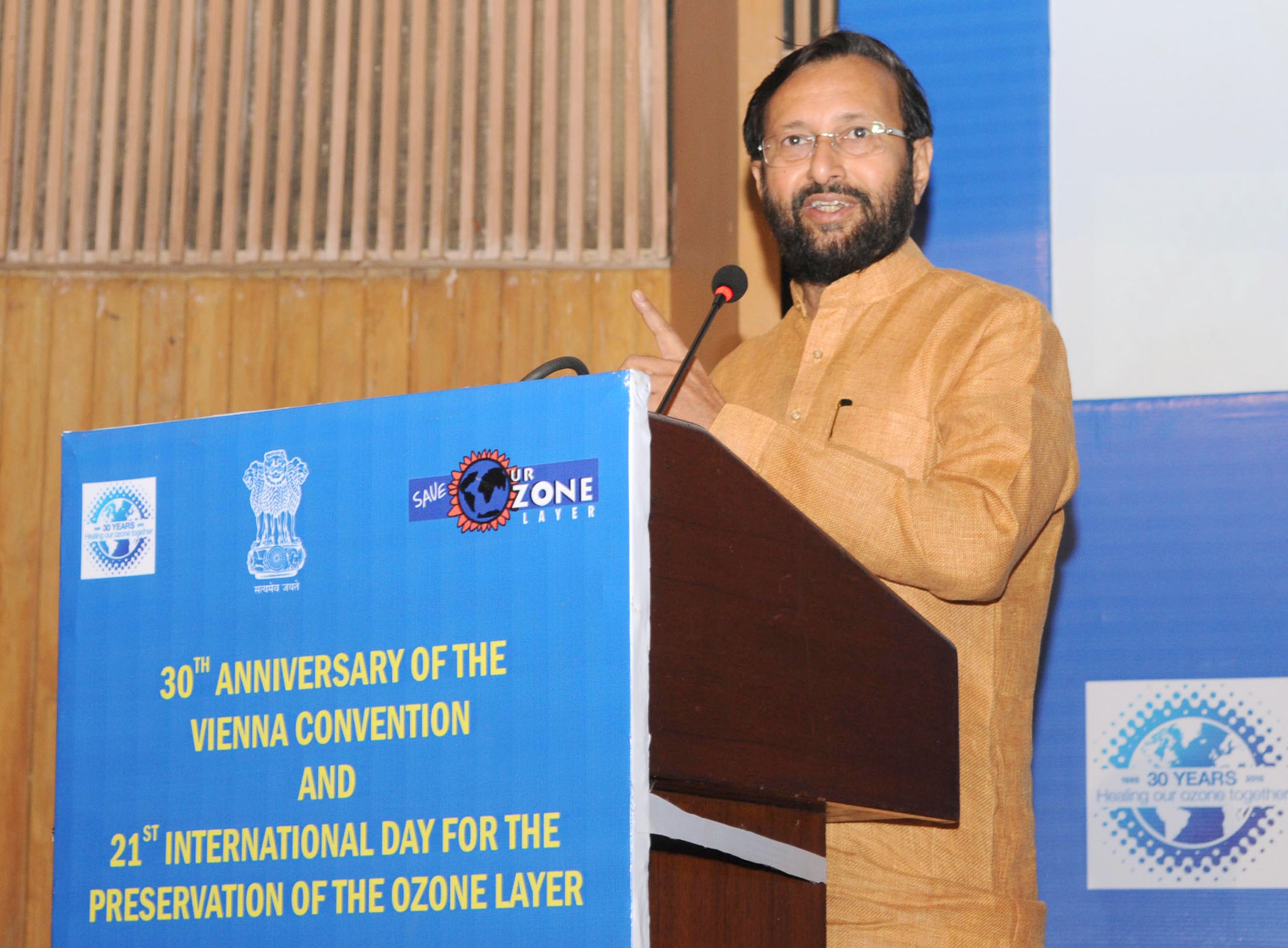
The Indian Minister of State for Environment, Forest and Climate Change, Shri Prakash Javadekar, addressing at the 21st International Day for the preservation of the ozone layer and the 30th anniversary of the Vienna Convention for the Protection of the Ozone layer, in New Delhi on 16 September 2015.

== Provisions ==
The treaty's provisions include the international sharing of climate and atmospheric research to promote knowledge of the effects on the ozone layer. In addition, the treaty calls for the adoption of international agencies to assess the harmful effects of depleted ozone and the promotion of policies that regulate the production of harmful substances that influence the ozone layer. One of the outcomes of the Vienna Convention was the creation of a panel of governmental atmospheric experts known as the Meeting of Ozone Research Managers, which assesses ozone depletion and climate change research and produces a report for the Conference of Parties (COP). Additionally, the COP utilizes the data assessed to suggest new policies aimed at limiting CFC emissions.

Currently, the COP meets every three years and coordinates with the timing of a similar meeting rendered under the Montreal Protocol. The Ozone Secretariat functions as an administrator of the COP, Montreal Meeting of Parties (MOP), and Open-Ended Working Groups that help facilitate functions under the convention. A Multilateral Fund exists to aid developing nations transition from ozone-depleting chemicals using guidelines under the convention, which is administered by a Multilateral Fund Secretariat. The Multilateral Fund has aided thousands of projects in nearly 150 countries, preventing the usage of roughly 250,000 tons of ozone-depleting chemicals.
