= Workers with Family Responsibilities Convention, 1981 =

International Labour Organization Convention

C156
- ILO Convention
- Date of adoption: June 23, 1981
- Date in force: August 11, 1983
- Classification: Equality of Opportunity and Treatment; Women's rights
- Subject: Equality of Opportunity and Treatment
- Previous: Occupational Safety and Health Convention, 1981
- Next: Maintenance of Social Security Rights Convention, 1982

Workers with Family Responsibilities Convention, 1981 is an International Labour Organization Convention.

== Background ==
The ILO Convention 156 followed the UN Convention on the Elimination of All Forms of Discrimination against Women, 1979, which recommended some maternity leave, and said in its preamble that states are "aware that a change in the traditional role of men as well as the role of women in society and in the family is needed to achieve full equality between men and women".

== Contents ==
The ILO Convention 156 was established in 1981, with the preamble stating:

Having decided upon the adoption of certain proposals with regard to equal opportunities and equal treatment for men and women workers: workers with family responsibilities,...

Article 1 provides the definition of "workers with family responsibilities"

Article 2 states that all branches of economic activity and all categories of workers fall under this convention.

Article 3 cites Discrimination (Employment and Occupation) Convention (ILO Convention C 111) to define the discrimination

Article 4 calls for measures to ensure these workers can freely choose employment and have their needs considered in employment terms and social security.

Article 5 advocates for community planning and services (like childcare) that support workers with family responsibilities.

Article 6 encourages public education to foster understanding and support for equality and the challenges faced by these workers

Article 7 promotes vocational guidance and training to help such workers enter, remain in, or return to the workforce.

Article 8 states that family responsibilities should not be a valid reason for terminating employment.

Article 9 allows the Convention's provisions to be implemented through various national legal and institutional frameworks.

Article 10 permits phased implementation of the Convention, considering national conditions, with reporting requirements on progress.

Article 11 ensures employers' and workers' organizations can participate in developing and applying measures related to the Convention.

Articles 12-19 detail the procedures for ratification, entry into force, denunciation, and revision of the Convention, as well as the roles of the ILO and its Director-General in these processes.

This convention is cited by Maternity Protection Convention, 2000 (ILO Convention C 183).

== Ratifications ==
As of May 2025, the convention had been ratified by 47 states.

Country	Date	Status
Albania	11 Oct 2007	In Force
Argentina	17 Mar 1988	In Force
Australia	30 Mar 1990	In Force
Azerbaijan	29 Oct 2010	In Force
Belgium	10 Apr 2015	In Force
Belize	22 Jun 1999	In Force
Bolivia	01 Sep 1998	In Force
Bosnia and Herzegovina	02 Jun 1993	In Force
Bulgaria	03 Apr 2006	In Force
Chile	14 Oct 1994	In Force
Colombia	06 Dec 2024	Not in Force (The Convention will enter into force for Colombia on 06 Dec 2025)
Costa Rica	11 Jul 2019	In Force
Croatia	08 Oct 1991	In Force
Ecuador	08 Feb 2013	In Force
El Salvador	12 Oct 2000	In Force
Ethiopia	28 Jan 1991	In Force
Finland	09 Feb 1983	In Force
France	16 Mar 1989	In Force
Greece	10 Jun 1988	In Force
Guatemala	06 Jan 1994	In Force
Guinea	16 Oct 1995	In Force
Iceland	22 Jun 2000	In Force
Kazakhstan	17 Jan 2013	In Force
Lithuania	6 May 2004	In Force
Mauritius	05 Apr 2004	In Force
Montenegro	03 Jun 2006	In Force
Netherlands	24 Mar 1988	In Force
Niger	05 Jun 1985	In Force
North Macedonia	17 Nov 1991	In Force
Norway	22 Jun 1982	In Force
Paraguay	21 Dec 2007	In Force
Peru	16 Jun 1986	In Force
Portugal	2 May 1985	In Force
South Korea	29 Mar 2001	In Force
Russian Federation	13 Feb 1998	In Force
San Marino	19 Apr 1988	In Force
Serbia	24 Nov 2000	In Force
Slovakia	14 Jun 2002	In Force
Slovenia	29 May 1992	In Force
Spain	11 Sep 1985	In Force
Sweden	11 Aug 1982	In Force
Ukraine	11 Apr 2000	In Force
Uruguay	16 Nov 1989	In Force
Uzbekistan	07 Aug 2024	Not in force (The Convention will enter into force for Uzbekistan on 07 Aug 2025)
Venezuela	27 Nov 1984	In Force
Yemen	13 Mar 1989	In Force
