= Maintenance of Migrants' Pension Rights Convention, 1935 (shelved) =

International Labour Organization Convention

C48
- ILO Convention
- Date of adoption: June 22, 1935
- Date in force: August 10, 1938
- This Convention has been "shelved".
- Classification: Old-age, Invalidity and Survivors Benefit
- Subject: Social Security
- Previous: Forty-Hour Week Convention, 1935
- Next: Reduction of Hours of Work (Glass-Bottle Works) Convention, 1935 (shelved)

Maintenance of Migrants' Pension Rights Convention, 1935 (shelved) is an International Labour Organization Convention.

It was established in 1935, with the preamble stating:

Having decided upon the adoption of certain proposals with regard to the maintenance of rights in course of acquisition and acquired rights under invalidity, old-age and widows' and orphans' insurance on behalf of workers who transfer their residence from one country to another, which is the first item on the agenda of the Session, and having determined that these proposals shall take the form of an international Convention, adopts this twenty-second day of June of the year one thousand nine hundred and thirty-five the following Convention, which may be cited as the Maintenance of Migrants' Pension Rights Convention, 1935:

The issue was incorporated into the new Maintenance of Social Security Rights Convention (Convention C157) established in 1982.

== Ratifications ==
Prior to it being shelved, the convention was ratified by 12 countries.

Country	Date	Status	Note
Bosnia and Herzegovina	02 Jun 1993	In Force	
Croatia	08 Oct 1991	In Force	
Hungary	10 Aug 1937	Not in force	Denounced on 27 Oct 1983
Israel	16 Jan 1963	In Force	
Italy	22 Oct 1952	In Force	
Montenegro	03 Jun 2006	In Force	
Netherlands	06 Oct 1938	Not in force	Denounced on 27 Jul 1999
North Macedonia	17 Nov 1991	In Force	
Poland	21 Mar 1938	Not in force	Denounced on 10 Aug 1973
Serbia	24 Nov 2000	In Force	
Slovenia	29 May 1992	In Force	
Spain	08 Jul 1937	Not in force	Automatic Denunciation on 11 Sep 1987 by convention C157
