= Hours of Work (Coal Mines) Convention (Revised), 1935 =

International Labour Organization Convention

C46
- ILO Convention
- Date of adoption: June 21, 1935
- Date in force: Withdrawn on May 30, 2000
- Classification: Underground Work
- Subject: Occupational Safety and Health
- Previous: Underground Work (Women) Convention, 1935
- Next: Forty-Hour Week Convention, 1935

Hours of Work (Coal Mines) Convention (Revised), 1935 was an International Labour Organization Convention that never came into force and was withdrawn.

It was established in 1935, with the preamble stating:

Having decided upon the adoption of certain proposals with regard to the partial revision of the Convention limiting hours of work in coal mines adopted by the Conference at its Fifteenth Session,,...

The convention did not come into force.

== Modification ==
The principles contained in the convention were a revision of ILO Convention C31, Hours of Work (Coal Mines) Convention, 1931.

== Withdrawn ==
The convention was never brought into force, and was withdrawn at the ILO General Conference May 30, 2000.

== Ratifications ==
Country	Date	Notes
Cuba	April 14, 1936	
Mexico	September 1, 1939	
Spain	November 30, 1971	
