= Reduction of Hours of Work (Public Works) Convention, 1936 =

International Labour Organization Convention

C51
- ILO Convention
- Date of adoption: June 23, 1936
- Date in force: Withdrawn; May 30, 2000
- Classification: Hours of Work
- Subject: Working Time
- Previous: Recruiting of Indigenous Workers Convention, 1936 (shelved)
- Next: Holidays with Pay Convention, 1936

Reduction of Hours of Work (Public Works) Convention, 1936 is an International Labour Organization Convention.

It was established in 1936, with the preamble stating:

Considering that the question of the reduction of hours of work on public works undertaken or subsidised by Governments is the third item on the agenda of the Session;,...

== Withdrawn ==
The convention was never brought into force, and was withdrawn at the ILO General Conference May 30, 2000.

== Ratifications ==
The convention was not ratified by any states.
