= Maternity Protection Convention (Revised), 1952 =

International Labour Organization Convention

C103
- ILO Convention
- Date of adoption: June 28, 1952
- Date in force: September 7, 1955
- Classification: Maternity Benefit; Maternity leave Maternity Protection
- Subject: Maternity Protection
- Previous: Social Security (Minimum Standards) Convention, 1952
- Next: Abolition of Penal Sanctions (Indigenous Workers) Convention, 1955 (shelved)

Maternity Protection Convention (Revised), 1952 is an International Labour Organization Convention.

It was established in 1952, with the preamble stating:

Having decided upon the adoption of certain proposals with regard to maternity protection,...

== Modification ==
The convention revised Convention C3 on definition of women, to be also irrespective of race and creed, not only of age, marriage status and nationality, and was subsequently revised in 2000 by Convention C183 on minimum condition of maternity leave (from 12 weeks to 14 weeks) and no

== Ratifications ==
As of 2013, the convention had been ratified by 41 states. Subsequently, the treaty has been denounced by 17 of the ratifying states, some automatically due to ratification of conventions that trigger automatic denunciation of the 1952 treaty.
