= Maternity Protection Convention, 1919 =

International Labour Organization convention

C3
- ILO Convention
- Date of adoption: November 28, 1919
- Date in force: June 13, 1921
- Classification: Maternity Benefit; Maternity Protection
- Subject: Maternity Protection
- Previous: Unemployment Convention, 1919
- Next: Night Work (Women) Convention, 1919 (shelved)

Maternity Protection Convention, 1919 is an International Labour Organization Convention.

It was established in 1919:

Having decided upon the adoption of certain proposals with regard to "women's employment, before and after childbirth, including the question of maternity benefit",...

== Modification ==
The principles contained in the convention were subsequently revised and included in ILO Convention C103, Maternity Protection Convention (Revised), 1952, and in Maternity Protection Convention, 2000.

== Ratifications ==
As of 2013, the convention had been ratified by 34 states. Of the ratifying states, eight have subsequently denounced the treaty.
