= Reduction of Hours of Work (Glass-Bottle Works) Convention, 1935 (shelved) =

International Labour Organization Convention

C49
- ILO Convention
- Date of adoption: June 25, 1935
- Date in force: June 10, 1938
- This Convention has been "shelved".
- Classification: Hours of Work
- Subject: Working Time
- Previous: Maintenance of Migrants' Pension Rights Convention, 1935 (shelved)
- Next: Recruiting of Indigenous Workers Convention, 1936 (shelved)

Reduction of Hours of Work (Glass-Bottle Works) Convention, 1935 (shelved) is an International Labour Organization Convention.

It was established in 1935, with the preamble stating:

Considering that the question of the reduction of hours of work is the sixth item on the agenda of the Session;

Confirming the principle laid down in the Forty-Hour Week Convention, 1935, including the maintenance of the standard of living;

Having determined to give effect to this reduction forthwith in the case of glass-bottle works,...

== Ratifications ==
Prior to it being shelved, the convention had been ratified by ten states.
