= Vienna Conference (1985) =

The Vienna Conference was the first international conference on ozone layer depletion. It was held in Vienna, Austria in 1985 when a hole in the stratospheric ozone layer was observed in the South Pole marked by increased UV-B infiltration over Antarctica. A 'hole', marked by significant drop in ozone molecules in the layer, as large as that of United States was discovered by a British team. The Vienna Convention for the Protection of the Ozone Layer was agreed at the conference and it entered into force in 1987.
