= Minimum Wage Fixing Machinery (Agriculture) Convention, 1951 =

International Labour Organization Convention

C99
- ILO Convention
- Date of adoption: June 28, 1951
- Date in force: August 23, 1953
- Classification: Minimum wage
- Subject: Wages
- Previous: Right to Organise and Collective Bargaining Convention, 1949
- Next: Equal Remuneration Convention, 1951

Minimum Wage Fixing Machinery (Agriculture) Convention, 1951 is an International Labour Organization Convention.

It was established in 1951, with the preamble stating:

Having decided upon the adoption of certain proposals with regard to minimum wage fixing machinery in agriculture,...

The convention was followed up by Minimum Wage Fixing Convention, 1970.

== Ratifications ==
As of September 2023, the convention had been ratified by 54 states. One ratifying state—the United Kingdom—has denounced the treaty.

Country	Date
Algeria	19 Oct 1962
Australia	19 Jun 1969
Austria	29 Oct 1953
Belgium	17 Oct 1968
Belize	15 Dec 1983
Cameroon	25 May 1970
Central African Republic	09 Jun 1964
Colombia	04 Mar 1969
Comoros	23 Oct 1978
Cook Islands	12 Jun 2015
Costa Rica	02 Jun 1960
Cuba	13 Jan 1954
Czechia	01 Jan 1993
Côte d'Ivoire	05 May 1961
Djibouti	03 Aug 1978
El Salvador	15 Jun 1995
Eswatini	05 Jun 1981
France	29 Mar 1954
Gabon	13 Jun 1961
Germany	25 Feb 1954
Grenada	09 Jul 1979
Guatemala	04 Aug 1961
Guinea	12 Dec 1966
Hungary	18 Jun 1969
Ireland	22 Jun 1978
Italy	05 May 1971
Kenya	09 Feb 1971
Malta	28 Nov 1969
Mauritius	02 Dec 1969
Mexico	23 Aug 1952
Morocco	14 Oct 1960
Netherlands	11 Jun 1954
New Zealand	01 Jul 1952
Papua New Guinea	01 May 1976
Paraguay	24 Jun 1964
Peru	01 Feb 1960
Philippines	29 Dec 1953
Poland	05 Jul 1977
Republic of Moldova	04 Apr 2003
Senegal	22 Oct 1962
Seychelles	06 Feb 1978
Sierra Leone	13 Jun 1961
Slovakia	01 Jan 1993
Spain	04 Jun 1970
Sri Lanka	05 Apr 1954
Syrian Arab Republic	10 Aug 1965
Tunisia	12 Jan 1959
Turkey	23 Jun 1970
Uruguay	18 Mar 1954
Zambia	20 Jun 1972
Zimbabwe	16 Sep 1993
