= Hours of Work (Commerce and Offices) Convention, 1930 =

International Labour Organization Convention

C30
- ILO Convention
- Date of adoption: June 28, 1930
- Date in force: August 29, 1933
- Classification: Hours of Work
- Subject: Working time
- Previous: Forced Labour Convention, 1930
- Next: Hours of Work (Coal Mines) Convention, 1931

Hours of Work (Commerce and Offices) Convention, 1930 is an International Labour Organization Convention.

It was established in 1930:

Having decided upon the adoption of certain proposals with regard to the regulations of hours of work in commerce and offices,...

== Ratifications ==
As of 2013, the convention had been ratified by 30 states. Two of the ratifying states—Finland and New Zealand—have subsequently denounced the treaty.

== See also ==
Hours of Work (Industry) Convention, 1919
