= Occupational Safety and Health Convention, 1981 =

International Labour Organization Convention

C155
- ILO Convention
- Date of adoption: June 22, 1981
- Date in force: August 11, 1983
- Classification: Occupational Safety and Health
- Subject: Occupational Safety and Health
- Previous: Collective Bargaining Convention, 1981
- Next: Workers with Family Responsibilities Convention, 1981

Occupational Safety and Health Convention, 1981 is an International Labour Organization Core Convention, number 155.

It was established in 1981, with the preamble stating:

Having decided upon the adoption of certain proposals with regard to safety and health and the working environment,...

In 2002, an additional protocol was adopted to this convention.

== Ratifications ==
As of April 2026, the convention had been ratified by 92 states, 17 of which have also ratified the additional protocol.

Country	Date	Status
Albania	09 Feb 2004	In Force
Algeria	06 Jun 2006	In Force
Angola	11 Jun 2025	Not in force
Antigua and Barbuda	16 Sep 2002	In Force
Argentina	13 Jan 2014	In Force
Australia	26 Mar 2004	In Force
Azerbaijan	29 May 2023	In Force
Bahrain	09 Sep 2009	In Force
Bangladesh	20 Nov 2025	Not in force
Barbados	5 Jun 2025	Not in force
Belarus	30 May 2000	In Force
Belgium	28 Feb 2011	In Force
Belize	22 Jun 1999	In Force
Bosnia and Herzegovina	02 Jun 1993	In Force
Brazil	18 May 1992	In Force
Bulgaria	3 Apr 2024	In Force
Cameroon	01 Oct 2021	In Force
Cape Verde	09 Aug 2000	In Force
Central African Republic	05 Jun 2006	In Force
Chile	10 June 2025	Not in force
China	25 Jan 2007	In Force
Congo	26 Oct 2023	In Force
Croatia	08 Oct 1991	In Force
Cuba	07 Sep 1982	In Force
Cyprus	16 Jan 1989	In Force
Czech Republic	01 Jan 1993	In Force
Denmark	10 Jul 1995	In Force
El Salvador	12 Oct 2000	In Force
Ethiopia	28 Jan 1991	In Force
France	16 Feb 2026	Not in force
Fiji	28 May 2008	In Force
Finland	24 Apr 1985	In Force
Gabon	28 Jul 2015	In Force
Greece	3 Mar 2026	Not in force
Grenada	26 Jun 2012	In Force
Guyana	17 Sep 2012	In Force
Hungary	04 Jan 1994	In Force
Iceland	21 Jun 1991	In Force
Italy	12 Oct 2023	In Force
Japan	1 Apr 2026	Not in force
Iran	07 Feb 2023	In Force
Ireland	04 Apr 1995	In Force
Ivory Coast	01 Apr 2016	In Force
Kazakhstan	30 Jul 1996	In Force
Laos	04 Jul 2022	In Force
Latvia	25 Jul 1994	In Force
Lesotho	01 Nov 2001	In Force
Luxembourg	21 Mar 2001	In Force
Madagascar	15 Jun 2023	In Force
Malawi	07 Nov 2019	In Force
Malaysia	11 June 2024	
Mali	12 Apr 2016	In Force
Mauritius	25 Jul 2014	In Force
Mexico	01 Feb 1984	In Force
Moldova	28 Apr 2000	In Force
Mongolia	3 Feb 1998	In Force
Montenegro	3 Jun 2006	In Force
Mozambique	26 Nov 2025	Not in force
New Zealand	12 Jun 2007	In Force
Niger	19 Feb 2009	In Force
Nigeria	03 May 1994	In Force
North Macedonia	17 Nov 1991	In Force
Norway	22 Jun 1982	In Force
Portugal	28 May 1985	In Force
Russia	02 Jul 1998	In Force
Rwanda	29 Jun 2018	In Force
Saint Lucia	14 May 2021	In Force
Sao Tome and Principe	04 May 2005	In Force
Senegal	01 Mar 2021	In Force
Serbia	24 Nov 2000	In Force
Seychelles	28 Oct 2005	In Force
Sierra Leone	25 Aug 2021	In Force
Singapore	11 Jun 2019	In Force
Slovakia	01 Jan 1993	In Force
Slovenia	29 May 1992	In Force
Somalia	08 Mar 2021	In Force
South Africa	18 Feb 2003	In Force
South Korea	20 Feb 2008	In Force
Spain	11 Sep 1985	In Force
Sweden	11 Aug 1982	In Force
Syria	19 May 2009	In Force
Thailand	10 June 2025	Not in force
Tajikistan	21 Oct 2009	In Force
Turkey	22 Apr 2005	In Force
Ukraine	04 Jan 2012	In Force
Uruguay	05 Sep 1988	In Force
Uzbekistan	19 Dec 2024	In Force
Venezuela	25 Jun 1984	In Force
Vietnam	03 Oct 1994	In Force
Zambia	23 Dec 2013	In Force
Zimbabwe	09 Apr 2003	In Force
