= Discrimination (Employment and Occupation) Convention =

International Labour Organization Convention

Discrimination (Employment and Occupation) Convention (No.111)
Convention concerning Discrimination in Respect of Employment and Occupation
- Type: Anti-discrimination law
- Signed: 25 June 1958
- Location: Geneva
- Effective: 15 June 1960
- Condition: 2 ratifications
- Parties: 175
- Depositary: Director-General of the International Labour Office
- Languages: French and English

The Convention concerning Discrimination in Respect of Employment and Occupation or Discrimination (Employment and Occupation) Convention (ILO Convention No.111) is an International Labour Organization Convention on anti-discrimination. It is one of eight ILO fundamental conventions. The convention requires states to enable legislation which prohibits all discrimination and exclusion on any basis including of race or colour, sex, religion, political opinion, national or social origin in employment and repeal legislation that is not based on equal opportunities.

This convention is cited by International Convention on the Elimination of All Forms of Racial Discrimination in 1969 and the ILO Workers with Famility Responsibilities Convention in 1981.

== (non)-Ratifications ==
As of January 2023, the convention had been ratified by 175 out of 187 ILO member states. ILO member states that have not ratified the convention are:

- Brunei
- Cook Islands
- Japan
- Malaysia
- Marshall Islands
- Myanmar
- Oman
- Palau
- Singapore
- Tonga
- Tuvalu
- United States

The convention has been extended by New Zealand to cover Tokelau. The convention has not been extended to Aruba, Curaçao, Sint Maarten, or the Caribbean Netherlands within the Kingdom of the Netherlands.
