= Hours of Work (Industry) Convention, 1919 =

International Labour Organization Convention

C1
- ILO Convention
- Date of adoption: November 28, 1919
- Date in force: June 13, 1921
- Classification: Hours of work
- Subject: Working time
- Previous: None
- Next: Unemployment Convention, 1919

Hours of Work (Industry) Convention, 1919 is an International Labour Organization Convention.

It was established in 1919:

Having decided upon the adoption of certain proposals with regard to the "application of the principle of the 8-hour working day or of the 48-hours week"...

== Ratifications ==
As of 2013, the convention had been ratified by 52 states. Of these ratifying states, one - New Zealand - has subsequently denounced the treaty.

Country	Date	Notes
Angola	June 4, 1976	
Argentina	November 30, 1933	
Austria	June 12, 1924	conditional ratification
Bangladesh	June 22, 1972	
Belgium	September 6, 1926	
Bolivia	November 15, 1973	
Bulgaria	February 14, 1922	
Burundi	July 30, 1971	
Canada	March 21, 1935	
Chile	September 15, 1925	
Colombia	June 20, 1933	
Comoros	November 23, 1978	
Costa Rica	March 1, 1982	
Cuba	September 20, 1934	
Czech Republic	January 1, 1993	
Djibouti	August 3, 1978	
Dominican Republic	February 4, 1933	
Egypt	May 10, 1960	ratified as the United Arab Republic
Equatorial Guinea	June 12, 1985	
France	February 6, 1927	conditional ratification
Ghana	June 19, 1973	
Greece	November 19, 1920	
Guatemala	June 14, 1988	
Guinea-Bissau	February 21, 1977	
Haiti	March 31, 1952	
India	July 14, 1921	ratified as British India
Iraq	August 24, 1965	
Israel	June 26, 1951	
Italy	October 6, 1924	conditional ratification
Kuwait	September 21, 1961	
Latvia	August 15, 1925	conditional ratification
Lebanon	June 1, 1977	
Libya	May 27, 1971	
Lithuania	June 19, 1931	
Luxembourg	April 16, 1928	
Malta	June 9, 1988	
Mozambique	June 6, 1977	
Myanmar	July 14, 1921	
New Zealand	March 29, 1938	denounced June 9, 1989
Nicaragua	April 12, 1934	
Pakistan	July 14, 1921	ratified as British India
Paraguay	March 21, 1966	
Peru	August 11, 1945	
Portugal	July 3, 1928	
Romania	June 13, 1921	
Saudi Arabia	June 15, 1978	
Slovakia	January 1, 1993	
Spain	February 22, 1929	
Syrian Arab Republic	May 10, 1960	ratified as the United Arab Republic
United Arab Emirates	May 27, 1982	
Uruguay	June 6, 1933	
Bolivarian Republic of Venezuela	November 20, 1944	

== See also ==
- Hours of Work (Commerce and Offices) Convention, 1930
