= Maternity Protection Convention, 2000 =

International Labour Organization Convention

C183
- ILO Convention
- Date of adoption: June 15, 2000
- Date in force: February 7, 2002
- Classification: Maternity Benefit; Maternity Protection
- Subject: Maternity Protection
- Previous: Worst Forms of Child Labour Convention, 1999
- Next: Safety and Health in Agriculture Convention, 2001

Maternity Protection Convention, 2000 is an International Labour Organization Convention.

It was established in 2000, with the preamble stating:

"Noting the need to revise the Maternity Protection Convention (Revised), 1952, and the Maternity Protection Recommendation, 1952, in order to further promote equality of all women in the workforce and the health and safety of the mother and child, and in order to recognize the diversity in economic and social development of Members, as well as the diversity of enterprises, and the development of the protection of maternity in national law and practice, and

"Noting the provisions of the Universal Declaration of Human Rights (1948), the United Nations Convention on the Elimination of All Forms of Discrimination Against Women (1979), the United Nations Convention on the Rights of the Child (1989), the Beijing Declaration and Platform for Action (1995), the International Labour Organization's Declaration on Equality of Opportunity and Treatment for Women Workers (1975), the International Labour Organization's Declaration on Fundamental Principles and Rights at Work and its Follow-up (1998), as well as the international labour Conventions and Recommendations aimed at ensuring equality of opportunity and treatment for men and women workers, in particular the Convention concerning Workers with Family Responsibilities, 1981, and

"Taking into account the circumstances of women workers and the need to provide protection for pregnancy, which are the shared responsibility of government and society, and

"Having decided upon the adoption of certain proposals with regard to the revision of the Maternity Protection Convention (Revised), 1952, and Recommendation, 1952, which is the fourth item on the agenda of the session, and

"Having determined that these proposals shall take the form of an international Convention;

"adopts this fifteenth day of June of the year two thousand the following Convention, which may be cited as the Maternity Protection Convention, 2000."

== History ==
This Convention revised a 1952 ILO convention (C103), which in turn was a revision of the original 1919 ILO convention (C3). The revision was aimed at gaining more ratification by easing the requirements of the 1952 convention.

== Content ==
The convention addresses the following subjects:

- Health protection
- Maternity leave (more than 14 week)
- Leave in case of illness or complications
- Benefits
- Employment protection and non-discrimination
- Breastfeeding mothers

== Ratifications ==
As of the April 2023, the following 43 states have ratified this Convention:

| Country | Date | Declared period of maternity leave at ratification | Notes |
|---|---|---|---|
| Albania | 24 July 2004 | 365 calendar days | |
| Antigua and Barbuda | 6 May 2022 | 125 calendar days | |
| Austria | 30 April 2004 | 16 weeks | |
| Azerbaijan | 29 October 2010 | 126 calendar days (longer in certain cases) | |
| Belarus | 10 February 2004 | 126 days | |
| Belize | 10 January 2012 | 14 weeks | |
| Benin | 30 April 2004 | 14 weeks | |
| Bosnia and Herzegovina | 18 January 2010 | one year; 18 months for subsequent births or twins | |
| Bulgaria | 6 December 2001 | 135 days | |
| Burkina Faso | 4 March 2013 | 14 weeks | |
| Cuba | 1 June 2004 | 18 weeks | |
| Czech Republic | 3 July 2017 | 28 weeks | |
| Cyprus | 12 January 2005 | 16 weeks | |
| Djibouti | 20 September 2020 | 26 weeks | |
| Dominican Republic | 9 February 2016 | 14 weeks | |
| El Salvador | 7 June 2022 | 16 weeks | |
| Germany | 30 September 2021 | 16 weeks | |
| Hungary | 4 November 2003 | 24 weeks | |
| Italy | 7 February 2001 | five months | |
| Kazakhstan | 13 June 2013 | 18 weeks (20 weeks for multiple births) | |
| Latvia | 9 February 2009 | 16 weeks | |
| Lithuania | 23 September 2003 | 126 calendar days | |
| Luxembourg | 8 April 2008 | 16 weeks | |
| Mali | 5 June 2008 | 14 weeks | |
| Mauritius | 13 Jun 2019 | 14 weeks | |
| Moldova | 28 August 2006 | 126 calendar days | |
| Montenegro | 19 April 2012 | 365 days | |
| Morocco | 13 April 2011 | 14 weeks | |
| Netherlands | 15 January 2009 | 16 weeks | applies to the European territory of the Kingdom only |
| Niger | 10 June 2019 | 14 weeks | |
| North Macedonia | 3 October 2012 | nine months; 12 months for multiple births | |
| Norway | 9 November 2015 | 12 weeks pre-birth; six weeks post-birth | |
| Panama | 22 March 2022 | 14 weeks | |
| Peru | 9 May 2016 | 14 weeks, divided evenly between pre-birth and post-birth | |
| Portugal | 8 November 2012 | 120 or 150 consecutive days | |
| Romania | 23 October 2002 | 126 calendar days | |
| San Marino | 19 June 2019 | 150 days | |
| São Tomé and Príncipe | 12 June 2017 | 14 week | |
| Senegal | 18 April 2017 | | |
| Serbia | 31 August 2010 | 16 weeks | |
| Slovakia | 12 December 2000 | 28 weeks | |
| Slovenia | 1 March 2010 | 105 days | |
| Switzerland | 4 June 2014 | 14 weeks | |
