= Odin (disambiguation) =

Odin is the chief god of the Norse pantheon.

Odin may also refer to:

== Music ==
- Odin (Wizard album), 2003
- Odin (Julian Cope album), 1999
- Odin (EP), a 1985 EP by Loudness
- Odin Records, a Norwegian record label
- Odin (band), a heavy metal band featured in The Decline of Western Civilization Part II: The Metal Years

== Fictional entities ==
- Odin (Marvel Comics), a Marvel Universe god based on the mythological god
  - Odin (Marvel Cinematic Universe), the film adaptation
- Kamen Rider Odin, character from Kamen Rider Ryuki
- Odin, a character in The Sandman by Neil Gaiman
- Odin, a character portraying the Norse god in Supernatural
- Odin, a character in Son of the Mask based on the Norse god
- Odin, a character from the Final Fantasy franchise
- Orbital Defence Initiative or ODIN, a fictional organization in Philip Reeve's books Infernal Devices and A Darkling Plain
- The Organization of Democratic Intelligence Networks, a fictional spy agency in Archer
- Odin, the Thor prototype in StarCraft II: Wings of Liberty
- Odin, a character in Fire Emblem Fates.
- Odin, a character from Hi-Rez's Smite video game

== Military ==
- Odin-class submarine, developed by the British Royal Navy in the 1920s
- Odin-class coastal defense ship, of the German Imperial Navy in the late 19th and early 20th centuries
  - SMS Odin, one of the two ships of the class
- HNoMS Odin, several warships of the Royal Norwegian Navy
- HMS Odin, several warships of the Royal Navy
- ICGV Óðinn, several offshore patrol vessel of the Icelandic Coast Guard
- Danish ironclad Odin (1872)
- Task Force ODIN (Observe, Detect, Identify, and Neutralize), a United States Army aviation battalion
- Bristol Odin, a ramjet engine for the British Sea Dart missile

== Places ==
- 3989 Odin, an asteroid
- Odin Planitia, a basin on Mercury
- Mount Odin, Baffin Island, Nunavut, Canada
- Mount Odin (British Columbia), Canada
- Mount Odin (Graham Land), in Graham Land, Antarctica
- Mount Odin (Victoria Land), in Victoria Land, Antarctica
- Odinland Peninsula, Greenland
- Odin Fjord, Greenland
- Odin Mine, Peak District, England, UK
- Odin, Illinois, a village
- Odin, Kansas, a census-designated place
- Odin Township, Marion County, Illinois
- Odin, Minnesota, a city
- Odin, Missouri, a community

== Science and technology ==
- Odin (satellite), an artificial satellite
- Odin (formerly Brokkr-2), an unsuccessful 2025 AstroForge commercial spacecraft
- ODIN (cable system), a submarine telecommunications cable system
- ODIN Technologies, an RFID integrator based in Virginia
- Odin (code conversion software), software to run Microsoft Windows programs on OS/2
- Odin (firmware flashing software), internal Samsung Android software
- Odin Service Automation, acquired by Ingram Micro
- Odin Computer Graphics, UK-based games developer during the 1980s

== Other ==
- Odin Brewery, in Denmark
- Odin (name)
- SV Odin Hannover, a German rugby union club
- ODIN '59, a Dutch football club
- Odinstårnet or Odin Tower, Denmark, a tower
- Odin: Photon Sailer Starlight, 1985 Japanese animated science fiction movie
- Odin Teatret, an Oslo theatre company
- Odin Stone, one of the Standing Stones of Stenness in Scotland
- Odin, class 47 diesel locomotive no: D1666 (later 47081, 47606, 47842), used on British Rail since March 1965
- Odin gas field, a depleted gas field in the Norwegian North Sea

== See also ==
- List of names of Odin
- List of places named after Odin
- Oden (disambiguation)
- Odense, the third-largest city in Denmark. The name Odense is derived from Odins vé, meaning "Odin's sanctuary".
- Odinism (disambiguation)
- Woden (disambiguation)
- Wotan (disambiguation)
