= Oden (disambiguation) =

Oden is a Japanese food.

Oden may also refer to:

== People ==
=== Surname ===
- Beverly Oden (born 1971), American volleyball player
- Birgitta Odén (1921–2016), Swedish historian
- Curly Oden (1899–1978), American football player
- Elaina Oden (born 1967), American volleyball player
- Greg Oden, (born 1988), American basketball player
- J. Tinsley Oden (born 1936), American academic
- Jeremy Oden (born 1968), American politician
- Johnnie Oden (1902–1972), American Negro league baseball player
- St. Louis Jimmy Oden (1903–1977), American blues musician
- Kim Oden (born 1964), American volleyball player
- Lon Oden (1863–1910), Texas Ranger of the Old West
- Robert A. Oden (born 1946), American academic
- Ron Oden (born 1950), American politician
- Scott Oden (born 1967), American writer
- Songül Öden (born 1979), Turkish actress
- Svante Odén (born 1924, disappeared 1986), Swedish soil scientist, meteorologist, and chemist
- Sven Odén (1887-1934), Swedish chemist and soil scientist
- Thomas C. Oden (1931–2016), American theologian
- William B. Oden (1935–2018), American Methodist bishop

=== Given name ===
- Oden Bowie (1826–1894), American politician, 34th governor of Maryland
- Takahashi Oden (1848–1879), Japanese murderer, last woman in Japan to be executed by beheading

== Places ==
- Odèn, Catalonia, Spain, a village
- Oden, Arkansas, United States, a town
- Oden, Michigan, United States, an unincorporated community and census-designated place
- Oden Lake, Scandia, Sweden - see Söderåsen

== Other uses ==
- Odin, sometimes Oden, a widely revered god in Germanic mythology
- List of ships named Oden
- Oden-class coastal defence ship, a Swedish Navy class
- Oden Institute for Computational Engineering and Sciences, University of Texas at Austin
- Oden High School, Oden, Arkansas

== See also ==
- Odin (disambiguation)
