= Arts Magazine =

Defunct American magazine devoted to fine art

The April 1981 cover of Arts Magazine

Arts Magazine was a prominent American monthly magazine devoted to fine art. It was established in 1926 and last published in 1992. Earlier names include the original name, The Art Digest, as well as Arts Digest and ARTS.

== History ==
=== Founding ===
Launched in 1926 and originally titled The Art Digest it was printed semi-monthly from October to May and monthly from June to September. Its stated purpose was to provide complete coverage of arts exhibitions in America, collated from all relevant news sources.

=== Growth ===
Art Digest was later purchased by James N. Rosenberg and Jonathan Marshall, who subsequently owned and published the Scottsdale Daily Progress newspaper. In 1954, the title was changed to Arts Digest; then, in 1955, the title was changed to ARTS. The word "Digest" was dropped because, as Marshall explained in the September 15, 1955 issue, the magazine was introducing newer features, design modernization, and seeking a widening audience. "We realized that there was a great need in this country for a serious art magazine to serve the growing public," the announcement stated. "Perhaps," he continued, "the best description of our editorial aims in the new ARTS can be found in the words interesting, unbiased, and authoritative." Contributors to that issue included J.P. Hodin, Martica Sawin, Robert Rosenblum, Ada Louise Huxtable, and Dore Ashton, whose article "What is 'avant-garde'?" was the feature essay.

Three years after Marshall and Rosenberg sold the publication in 1958, in 1961, its name was changed to Arts Magazine. Regular contributors at the time included Donald Judd, Sidney Tillim, Annette Michelson, Michael Fried, Lawrence Alloway, Jan Butterfield, and April Kingsley.

The magazine's offices were in New York City and it was last published by Art Digest, Co. The magazine was glossy and priced at $4.00 a copy in 1981. The April 1981 issue had a cover story called "Gertrude Greene: Constructions of the 1930s and 1940s", written by Jacqueline Moss.

=== Closure ===
The last issue to reach subscribers was in March 1992, featuring Alexandra Anderson-Spivy on artist Rackstraw Downes and Annie Sprinkle on Jeff Koons. The April issue was published but never mailed. Editors at the time included Dore Ashton, Jerry Saltz, Barry Schwabsky, Bill Jones, Jeremy Gilbert-Rolfe, Peter Selz, John Yau, Elizabeth Frank, and Jeanne Siegel.

=== Revival ===
As of 2020, the magazine is in the process of a revival. A new team of writers from leading media publications (e.g. The New York Times) and universities (Vanderbilt, New York University) has been assembled and website in developed and prepared for the official launch.
