= Hodin =

Hodin is a surname. Notable people with the surname include:

- Oleksiy Hodin (born 1983), Ukrainian footballer and coach
- J. P. Hodin (1905–1995), Czechoslovak art historian

== See also ==
- Odin (name)
