= Academician =

Member of an art, literary, or scientific academy

An academician is a full member of an artistic, literary, engineering, or scientific academy. In many countries, it is an honorific title used to denote a full member of an academy that has a strong influence on national scientific life.

Accordingly, within systems such as the Academy of Sciences of the USSR, the title grants privileges and administrative responsibilities for funding allocation and research priorities.

== History ==
Historically, the meaning for the title of Academician follows the traditions of the two most successful early scientific societies: either the Royal Society, where it was an honorary recognition by an independent body of peer reviewers and was meant to distinguish a person, while giving relatively little formal power, or the model of the French Academy of Sciences, which was much closer integrated with the government, provided with more state funding as an organization, and where the title of Academician implied in a lot more rights when it came to decision making.

== China ==
Being an academician in China is a top honour and title granted only to the nation's top scientists and engineers. Academicians are elected through either the Chinese Academy of Sciences and Chinese Academy of Engineering.

== United Kingdom ==
The British honours "Fellow of the Royal Society" (FRS) or Fellow of the Academy of Social Sciences can be considered rough equivalents. Fellowship of the Academy of Social Sciences was known as the Award of Academician until July 2014. Fellows of the Royal Academy of Engineering in the UK are recognized as academicians and members include Nobel Prize winners and the nation's top engineers and scientists. For example, in 2018, Nobel Prize winner Frances Arnold was elected to the Royal Academy of Engineering.

== United States ==
In the United States of America, academicians are elected members of the National Academy of Sciences and National Academy of Engineering. Members include many Nobel Prize, Turing Awards, and Fields Medalists.

== Sweden ==
Sweden does not use the academician concept, but membership in learned societies are noted in the Swedish State Calendar. The Swedish Royal Academies are independent organizations, founded on Royal command, that act to promote the arts, culture, and science in Sweden. The Swedish Academy and Academy of Sciences who are responsible for the selection of Nobel Prize laureates in Literature, Physics, Chemistry, and the Prize in Economic Sciences. Also included in the Royal Academies are scientific societies that were granted Royal Charters. There are a few esteemed Swedish learned societies that has not sought Royal command, including the Society of Sciences in Lund.

== Eastern Europe ==
Academician may also be a functional title and denote a full member of the National Academy of Sciences in those countries where the academy has a strong influence on national scientific life, particularly countries that were part of, or influenced by, the Soviet Union. In such countries, academician is used as an honorific title (like "Doctor", "Professor", etc.) when addressing or speaking about someone. Countries where the term academician is used in this way include the Russian Federation, China, Armenia, Azerbaijan, Belarus, Bosnia and Herzegovina, Bulgaria, Croatia, Estonia, Georgia, Hungary, Latvia, Lithuania, Moldova, Mongolia, North Macedonia, Romania, Tajikistan, Turkey, Serbia, Slovenia, Ukraine and Uzbekistan.

However, since the reforms of late USSR dismantled the de facto monopoly of the state on forming academies, the creation of voluntary academies has been allowed. While some of the newly created academies did improve the relatively rigid structure, the prestige and meaning of the title has been substantially undermined; as the title of "academician" could be awarded by associations of pseudoscientists or organizations that use the title for the sole purpose of gaining money. Therefore, it became customary and almost compulsory to list which academy gave the title to assert its meaningfulness.

== Europe ==
In Europe, academicians are elected by Pan-European academies, such as the European Academy of Sciences and Arts and the Academia Europaea.

== Canada ==
In Canada, fellowship of the Royal Society of Canada is a comparable honour.

== Finland ==
In Finland, "Academician" (Finnish: akateemikko, Swedish: akademiker) is an honorary title and the President of the Republic nominates the Academicians. There can be 12 Finnish Academicians representing science and scholarly pursuits and eight Academicians representing fine arts and literature at the same time. The Academy of Finland is the state funding agency of Finnish science and letters, but it has no organizational connection to Finnish Academicians. The scientists and scholars funded by the Academy of Finland are called Academy Professors (Finnish: akatemiaprofessori, Swedish: akademiprofessor) and Academy Research Fellows (Finnish: akatemiatutkija, Swedish: akademiforskare). In addition to Academy of Finland, Finland has four independent national academies. Finnish academies are less recognized globally due to its lack of international exposure and use of English language.

== Taiwan ==
In Taiwan, elected members of Academia Sinica are considered academicians.

== Corresponding member ==
A related option of membership also exists in some countries—a corresponding member is a person who is eminent in respect of scientific results but cannot or does not wish to become a full academy member.

One of the reasons for this may be that they live far from the academy and it is inconvenient to often travel to its headquarters. It is, for example, the case when the person does not live in the country of the academy. For communication, such a scientist uses "correspondence".

The charter or traditions of some the academies do not allow election to full membership, until they have been a corresponding member for a certain period and have demonstrated additional achievements within this period. Because of this, in the Russian Academy of Sciences a corresponding membership is a seen as a lower level of membership.

== See also ==
- Académie française
- Academy
- Academy of sciences (a list of national academies of sciences)
