= Acid rain =

Rain that is unusually acidic

External audio
- "Whatever Happened to Acid Rain?", Science History Institute

Processes involved in acid deposition (only SO_{2} and NO_{x}) play a significant role in acid rain

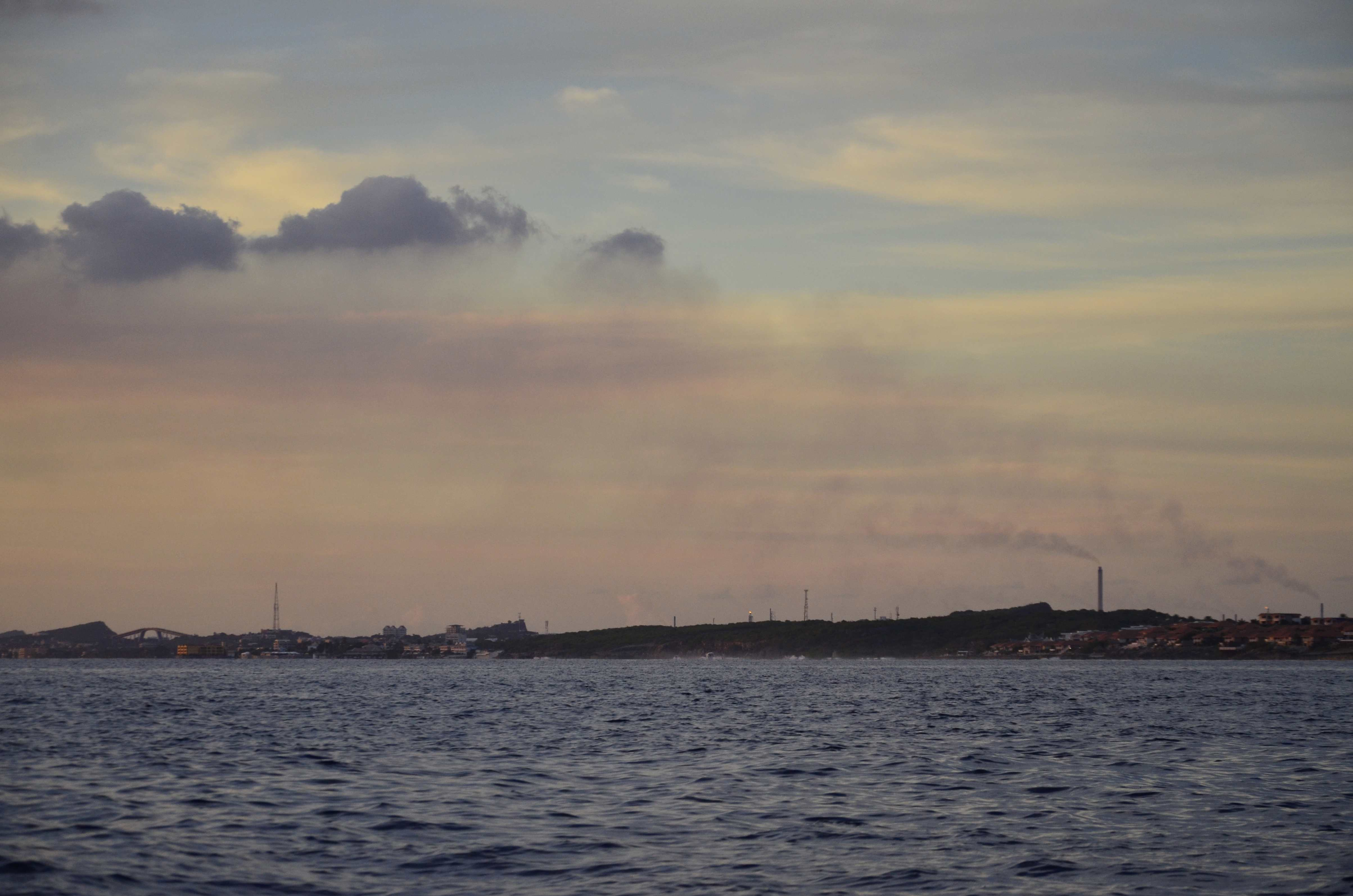
Acid clouds can grow on SO_{2} emissions from refineries, as seen here in Curaçao.

Acid rain is rain or any other form of precipitation that is unusually acidic, meaning that it has elevated levels of hydrogen ions (low pH). Most water, including drinking water, has a neutral pH that exists between 6.5 and 8.5, but acid rain has a pH level lower than this and ranges from 4–5 on average. The more acidic the acid rain is, the lower its pH is. Acid rain can have harmful effects on plants, aquatic animals, and infrastructure. Acid rain is caused by emissions of sulfur dioxide and nitrogen oxide, which react with the water molecules in the atmosphere to produce sulfuric and nitric acids.

Acid rain has been shown to have adverse impacts on forests, freshwaters, soils, microbes, insects and aquatic life-forms. In ecosystems, persistent acid rain negatively affects tree bark, leaving trees more susceptible to environmental stressors such as drought, fire, solar radiation, frost and pest infestation. Acid rain is also capable of detrimenting soil composition by stripping it of nutrients such as calcium and magnesium which play a critical role in plant growth and maintaining healthy soil. In terms of human infrastructure, acid rain also causes the peeling of paint, corrosion of steel structures, and weathering of stone buildings and statues as well as having impacts on human health.

Some governments, including those in Europe and North America, have made efforts since the 1970s to reduce the release of sulfur dioxide and nitrogen oxide into the atmosphere through air pollution regulations such as the US Clean Air Act and the EU Ambient Air Quality Directive. These efforts have had positive results due to the widespread research on acid rain starting in the 1960s and the publicized information on its harmful effects. The main source of sulfur and nitrogen compounds that result in acid rain are anthropogenic, but nitrogen oxides can also be produced naturally by lightning strikes and sulfur dioxide is produced by volcanic eruptions.

== Definition ==
Acid rain is rain with a pH less than 5. "Clean" or unpolluted rain has a pH greater than 5 but still less than 7 owing to the acidity caused by carbonic acid (H2CO3) according to the following reactions:

H_{2}O + CO_{2} ⇌ H_{2}CO_{3}
H_{2}O + H_{2}CO_{3} ⇌ HCO^{−}_{3} + H_{3}O^{+}

A variety of natural and human-made sources contribute to the acidity of precipitations. For example nitric acid is produced by electric discharges in the atmosphere such as in lightnings. The usual anthropogenic sources of acid deposition are sulfur dioxide and nitrogen oxide. They react with water (as does carbon dioxide) to give solutions with pH < 5. Occasional pH readings in rain and fog water of well below 2.4 have been reported in industrialized areas.

== History ==
Acid rain was first systematically studied in Europe in the 1960s, in the United States and Canada in 1970s, and in India in the late 1980s.

=== In Europe ===
The corrosive effect of polluted, acidic air of London on limestone and marble was noted in the 17th century by John Evelyn, who remarked upon the poor condition of the Arundel marbles. Since the Industrial Revolution, emissions of sulfur dioxide and nitrogen oxides into the atmosphere have increased. In 1852, Robert Angus Smith was the first to show the relationship between acid rain and atmospheric pollution in Manchester, England. Smith coined the term "acid rain" in 1872.

As soon as the 1960s, European scientists began widely observing and studying the phenomenon. In 1955 two Swedish scientists had already quoted that "the precipitation over Sweden as a whole is definitely more acid than the CO2 equilibrium alone would permit". At first, the main focus in this research laid on local effects of acid rain. Waldemar Christofer Brøgger was the first to acknowledge long-distance transportation of pollutants crossing borders from the United Kingdom to Norway. Near a century later this problem was systematically studied by Brynjulf Ottar in the 1970s. Ottar's work was strongly influenced by Swedish soil scientist Svante Odén, who had drawn widespread attention to Europe's acid rain problem in popular newspapers and wrote a landmark paper on the subject in 1968.

=== In the United States ===
External audio
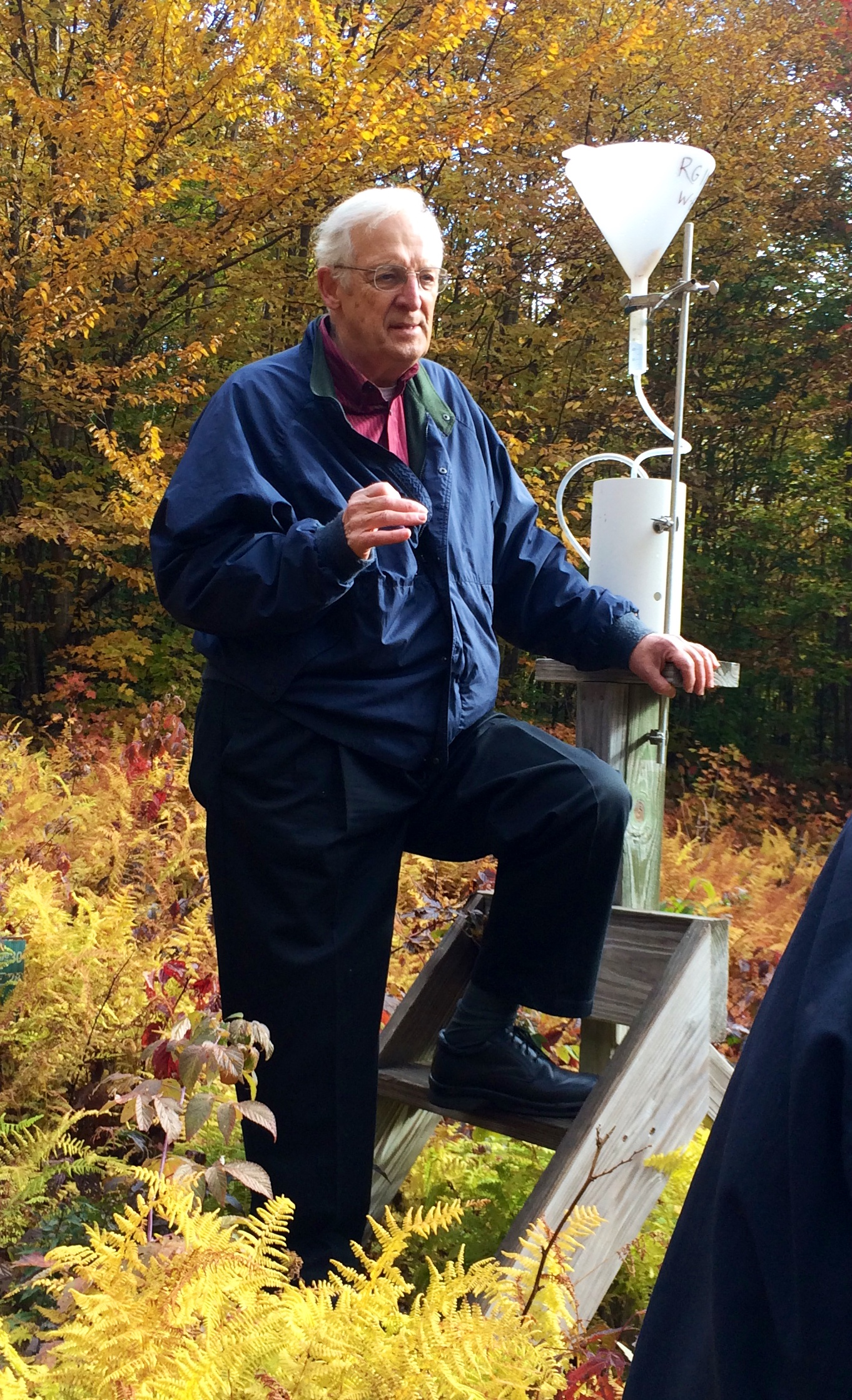
- "Whatever Happened to Acid Rain?", Distillations Podcast, Science History Institute

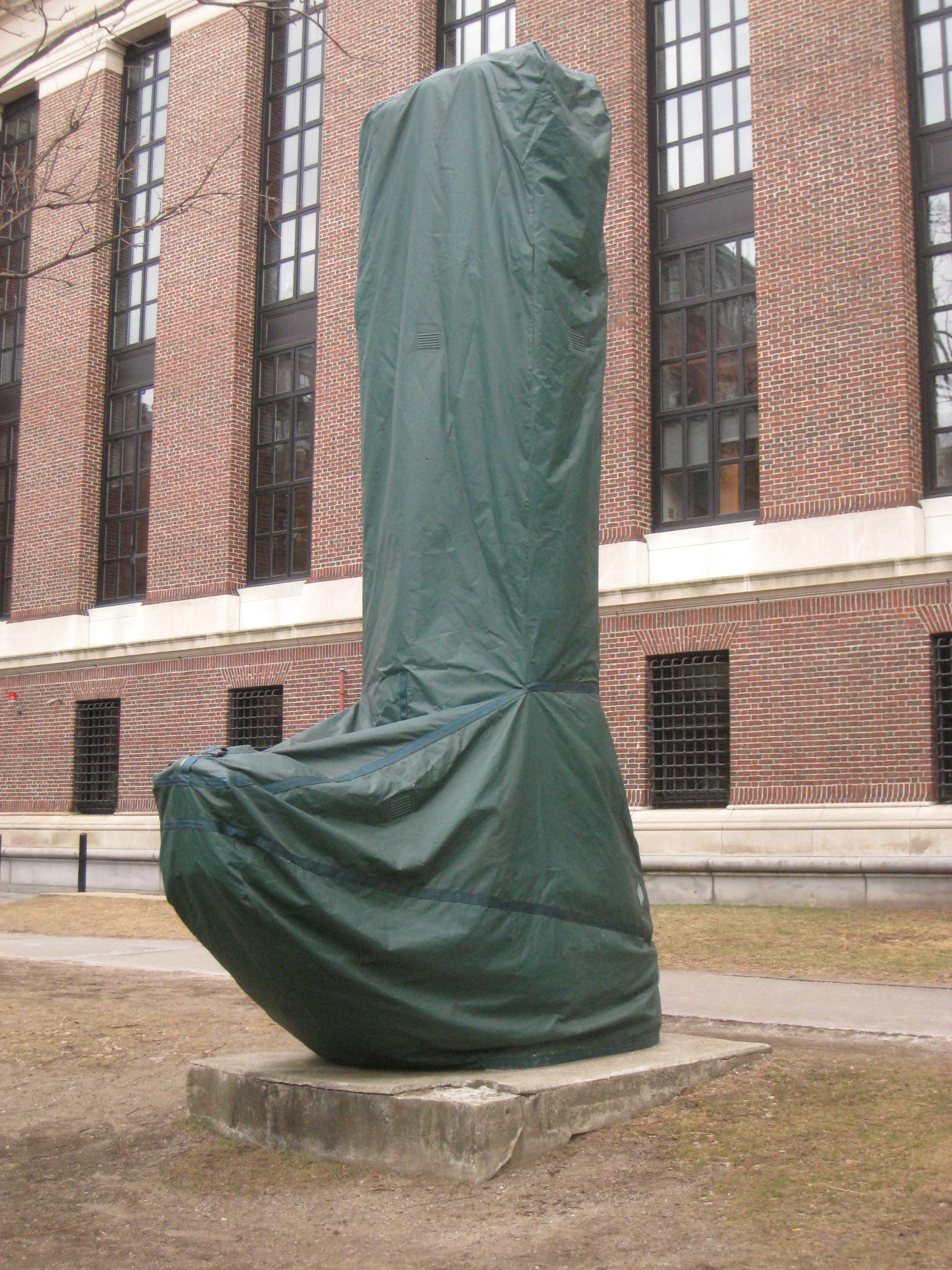
Since 1998, Harvard University wraps some of the bronze and marble statues on its campus, such as this "Chinese stele", with waterproof covers every winter, in order to protect them from corrosion caused by acid rain and acid snow.

The earliest report about acid rain in the United States came from chemical evidence gathered from Hubbard Brook Valley; public awareness of acid rain in the US increased in the 1970s after The New York Times reported on these findings.

In 1972, a group of scientists, including Gene Likens, discovered the rain that was deposited at White Mountains of New Hampshire was acidic. The pH of the sample was measured to be 4.03 at Hubbard Brook. The Hubbard Brook Ecosystem Study followed up with a series of research studies that analyzed the environmental effects of acid rain. The alumina from soils neutralized acid rain that mixed with stream water at Hubbard Brook. The result of this research indicated that the chemical reaction between acid rain and aluminium leads to an increasing rate of soil weathering. Experimental research examined the effects of increased acidity in streams on ecological species. In 1980, scientists modified the acidity of Norris Brook, New Hampshire, and observed the change in species' behaviors. There was a decrease in species diversity, an increase in community dominants, and a reduction in the food web complexity.

In 1980, the US Congress passed an Acid Deposition Act in the 100th Congress between 1987 and 1988, mandating that U.S. states must reduce their annual sulfur dioxide emissions to below 10 million tons; it also required the United States Environmental Protection Agency (EPA) to evaluate the states no later the 1992. This Act established an 18-year assessment and research program under the direction of the National Acid Precipitation Assessment Program (NAPAP). NAPAP enlarged a network of monitoring sites to determine how acidic precipitation was, seeking to determine long-term trends, and established a network for dry deposition. Using a statistically based sampling design, NAPAP quantified the effects of acid rain on a regional basis by targeting research and surveys to identify and quantify the impact of acid precipitation on freshwater and terrestrial ecosystems. NAPAP also assessed the effects of acid rain on historical buildings, monuments, and building materials. It also funded extensive studies on atmospheric processes and potential control programs.

From the start, policy advocates from all sides attempted to influence NAPAP activities to support their particular policy advocacy efforts, or to disparage those of their opponents. For the US Government's scientific enterprise, a significant impact of NAPAP were lessons learned in the assessment process and in environmental research management to a relatively large group of scientists, program managers, and the public.

In 1981, the National Academy of Sciences was looking into research about the controversial issues regarding acid rain, in particular the role of fossil fuel combustion. President Ronald Reagan dismissed the issues of acid rain until his personal visit to Canada and confirmed that the Canadian border suffered from the drifting pollution from smokestacks originating in the US Midwest. Reagan honored the agreement to Canadian Prime Minister Pierre Trudeau's enforcement of anti-pollution regulation. In 1982, Reagan commissioned William Nierenberg to serve on the National Science Board. Nierenberg selected scientists including Gene Likens to serve on a panel to draft a report on acid rain. In 1983, the panel of scientists came up with a draft report, which concluded that acid rain is a real problem and solutions should be sought. White House Office of Science and Technology Policy reviewed the draft report and sent Fred Singer's suggestions of the report, which cast doubt on the anthropic causes of acid rain. The panelists revealed rejections against Singer's positions and submitted the report to Nierenberg in April. In May 1983, the House of Representatives voted against legislation controlling sulfur emissions. There was a debate about whether Nierenberg delayed the release of the report. Nierenberg denied the saying about his suppression of the report and stated that it was withheld after the House's vote because it was not ready to be published.

In 1991, the US National Acid Precipitation Assessment Program (NAPAP) provided its first assessment of acid rain in the United States. It reported that 5% of New England lakes were acidic, with sulfates being the most common problem. They noted that 2% of the lakes could no longer support Brook Trout, and 6% of the lakes were unsuitable for the survival of many minnow species. Subsequent Reports to Congress have documented chemical changes in soil and freshwater ecosystems, nitrogen saturation, soil nutrient decreases, episodic acidification, regional haze, and damage to historical monuments.

Meanwhile, in 1990, the US Congress passed a series of amendments to the Clean Air Act. Title IV of these amendments established a cap and trade system designed to control emissions of sulfur dioxide and nitrogen oxides. Both these emissions proved to cause a significant problem for U.S. citizens and their access to healthy, clean air. Title IV called for a total reduction of about 10 million tons of SO_{2} emissions from power plants, close to a 50% reduction. It was implemented in two phases. Phase I began in 1995 and limited sulfur dioxide emissions from 110 of the largest power plants to 8.7 million tons of sulfur dioxide. One power plant in New England (Merrimack) was in Phase I. Four other plants (Newington, Mount Tom, Brayton Point, and Salem Harbor) were added under other program provisions. Phase II began in 2000 and affects most of the power plants in the country.

During the 1990s, research continued. On March 10, 2005, the EPA issued the Clean Air Interstate Rule (CAIR). This rule provides states with a solution to the problem of power plant pollution that drifts from one state to another. CAIR will permanently cap emissions of SO_{2} and NO_{x} in the eastern United States. CAIR hoped to reduce SO_{2} emissions in 28 eastern states and the District of Columbia by over 70% and NO_{x} emissions by over 60% from 2003 levels. CAIR was replaced by the Cross-State Air Pollution Rule (CSAPR), as of 1 January 2015.

Overall, the program's cap and trade program has been successful in achieving its goals. Since the 1990s, SO_{2} emissions have dropped 40%, and according to the Pacific Research Institute, acid rain levels have dropped 65% since 1976. Conventional regulation was used in the European Union, which saw a decrease of over 70% in SO_{2} emissions during the same period.

In 2007, total SO_{2} emissions were 8.9 million tons, achieving the program's long-term goal ahead of the 2010 statutory deadline.

In 2007 the EPA estimated that by 2010, the overall costs of complying with the program for businesses and consumers would be $1 billion to $2 billion a year, only one-fourth of what was initially predicted. Forbes says: "In 2010, by which time the cap and trade system had been augmented by the George W. Bush administration's Clean Air Interstate Rule, SO_{2} emissions had fallen to 5.1 million tons."

The term citizen science can be traced back as far as January 1989 to a campaign by the Audubon Society to measure acid rain, with 280 volunteers nationwide, all members of the Audubon Society, making a one-year commitment to collect and measure the pH of precipitation samples.

=== In Canada ===
Canadian Harold Harvey was among the first to research a "dead" lake. In 1972, he and Richard Beamish documented the gradual deterioration of fish stocks in 60 lakes in Killarney Park in Ontario, which they had been studying systematically since 1966.

In the 1970s and 80s, acid rain was a major topic of research at the Experimental Lakes Area (ELA) in Northwestern Ontario, Canada. Researchers added sulfuric acid to whole lakes in controlled ecosystem experiments to simulate the effects of acid rain. Because its remote conditions allowed for whole-ecosystem experiments, research at the ELA showed that the effect of acid rain on fish populations started at concentrations much lower than those observed in laboratory experiments. In the context of a complete food web, fish populations crashed earlier than when acid rain had direct toxic effects to the fish because the acidity led to crashes in prey populations (e.g. mysids). As experimental acid inputs were reduced, fish populations and lake ecosystems recovered at least partially, although invertebrate populations have still not completely returned to the baseline conditions. This research showed both that acidification was linked to declining fish populations and that the effects could be reversed if sulfuric acid emissions decreased, and influenced policy in Canada and the United States.

In 1985, seven Canadian provinces (all except British Columbia, Alberta, and Saskatchewan) and the federal government signed the Eastern Canada Acid Rain Program. The provinces agreed to limit their combined sulfur dioxide emissions to 2.3 million tonnes by 1994. The US-Canada Air Quality Agreement was signed in 1991. In 1998, all federal, provincial, and territorial Ministers of Energy and Environment signed The Canada-Wide Acid Rain Strategy for Post-2000, which was designed to protect lakes that are more sensitive than those protected by earlier policies.

=== In India ===
Acid rain was first reported in Mumbai (then Bombay) in 1974. Acid rain has been a reported cause of decrease in soil pH, especially in the northeast region, as well as the coastal regions of Karnataka, Kerala, Odisha, Bihar, and West Bengal.

The spread of acid rain over India was first studied by a team of researchers in 1989.

Increased risk might be posed by the expected rise in total sulphur emissions from 4,400 kilotonnes (kt) in 1990 to 6,500 kt in 2000, 10,900 kt in 2010 and 18,500 in 2020. Damage to Taj Mahal is a popular example of acid rain's corrosive effect in India.

India is the largest sulphur emitter, mostly from coal-fired power plants. On 11 July 2025, the Indian government changed its own rules, exempting most coal-fired power plants from installing technology to reduce sulphur dioxide (SO2) emissions, reversing a key environmental policy launched in 2015 to cut sulphur emissions.

=== In China ===
In China, concern about the possible effects of acid rain emerged later than in Europe and North America. The first reports in the international literature regarding acid rain in China appeared in the 1980s. A major cause of acid rain in China is the extensive use of coal, which in 2004 accounted for 69% of the energy production. A set of five integrated monitoring sites was established through a Chinese–Norwegian cooperative project, the Integrated Monitoring Program on Acidification of Chinese Terrestrial Systems (IMPACTS), showing that in 2003 sulphur deposition exceeded maximum levels observed in Europe and North-America. However, a great need still exists for better monitoring of the environmental situation in China to support policy development and follow-up on emission reduction measures.

== Emissions of chemicals leading to acidification ==
The most important gas which leads to acidification is sulfur dioxide. However, emissions of nitrogen oxides (NOx) and ammonia which are further oxidized to form nitric acid are of increasing importance due to stricter controls on emissions of sulfur compounds and the near absence of control on acid rain gasses emitted by intensive farming. 70 Tg(S) per year in the form of SO_{2} comes from fossil fuel combustion and industry, 2.8 Tg(S) from wildfires, and 7–8 Tg(S) per year from volcanoes.

=== Natural phenomena ===
Mean acidifying emissions (air pollution) of different foods per 100g of protein
Food Types	Acidifying Emissions (g SO_{2}eq per 100g protein)
Beef	343.6
Cheese	165.5
Pork	142.7
Lamb and Mutton	139.0
Farmed Crustaceans	133.1
Poultry	102.4
Farmed Fish	65.9
Eggs	53.7
Groundnuts	22.6
Peas	8.5
Tofu	6.7

The principal natural phenomena that contribute acid-producing gases to the atmosphere are emissions from volcanoes. Thus, for example, fumaroles from the Laguna Caliente crater of Poás Volcano create extremely high amounts of acid rain and fog, with soil acidity as high as a pH of 2, clearing an area of any vegetation and soil organisms and frequently causing irritation to the eyes and lungs of inhabitants in nearby settlements. Acid-producing gases are also created by biological processes that occur in wetlands and the oceans. The major biological source of atmospheric sulfur compounds is dimethyl sulfide.

Nitric acid is also produced by electrical activity in the atmosphere such as lightning. Despite its toxicity, and negative effects of low pH, nitric acid in rainwater is an important source of fixed nitrogen for plant life.

Acidic sulfate deposits associated with tephra have been detected in glacial ice thousands of years old in remote parts of the globe, suggesting that volcanism was the main agent of rain acidification before the Anthropocene.

=== Human activity ===
The coal-fired Gavin Power Plant in Cheshire, Ohio

The principal cause of present-day acid rain is sulfur and nitrogen compounds from human sources, such as coal-fired power stations, animal agriculture, fertilizers, steel mills, and motor vehicles. Power plants account for a quarter of nitrogen oxides (NOx) and two-thirds of sulfur dioxide within the atmosphere. Industrial acid rain is still a substantial problem in China and Russia and areas downwind from them. These areas all burn sulfur-containing coal to generate heat and electricity.

The problem of acid rain has not only increased with population and industrial growth, but has become more widespread. The use of tall smokestacks to reduce local pollution has contributed to the spread of acid rain by releasing gases into regional atmospheric circulation; dispersal from these taller stacks causes pollutants to be carried farther, causing widespread ecological damage. Often deposition occurs a considerable distance downwind of the emissions, with mountainous regions tending to receive the greatest deposition because of their higher rainfall and direct contact with long-distance transported clouds. An example of this effect is the low pH of rain which falls in Scandinavia. Acid rain falls at a pH value of roughly 4, making it harmful to consume for humans, plants, microbes and animals. When these low pH levels fall in specific regions, they not only affect the environment but also human health. With acidic pH levels in humans comes hair loss, low urinary pH, severe mineral deficiency, constipation, and many cases of chronic disorders like fibromyalgia and basal-cell carcinoma.

== Chemical process ==
Combustion of fuels and smelting of some ores produce sulfur dioxide and nitric oxides (NOx). They are converted into sulfuric acid and nitric acid by photochemical reactions in the troposphere.

In the gas phase sulfur dioxide is oxidized to sulfuric acid:

SO_{2} + 0.5 O_{2} + H_{2}O → H_{2}SO_{_{4}}

Nitrogen dioxide reacts with hydroxyl radicals, the dominant oxidizing agent in the global troposphere, to form nitric acid:

This shows the process of the air pollution being released into the atmosphere and the areas that will be affected.

NO_{2} + OH· → HNO_{3}

The detailed mechanisms depend on the presence water and traces of iron and manganese. A number of oxidants are capable of these reactions aside from O_{2}, these include ozone, hydrogen peroxide, and oxygen.

== Acid deposition ==
=== Wet deposition ===
Wet deposition of acids occurs when any form of precipitation (e.g. rain, snow, fog) removes acids from the atmosphere and delivers them to the Earth's surface. This can result from the deposition of acids produced in the raindrops or by the precipitation removing the acids either in clouds or below clouds. Wet removal of both gases and aerosols are both of importance for wet deposition.

=== Dry deposition ===
Acid deposition also occurs via dry deposition in the absence of precipitation. This can be responsible for as much as 20 to 60% of total acid deposition. This occurs when particles and gases stick to the ground, plants or other surfaces.

== Adverse effects ==
Acid rain has been shown to have adverse impacts on forests, freshwaters and soils, killing terrestrial and aquatic life-forms as well as causing damage to buildings and having impacts on human health.

=== Surface waters and aquatic animals ===
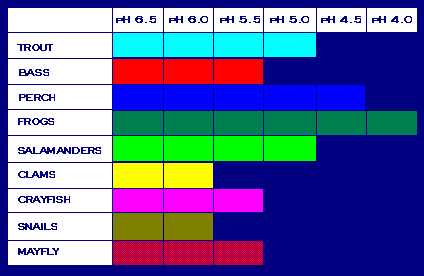
Not all fish, shellfish, or the insects that they eat can tolerate the same amount of acid; for example, frogs can tolerate water that is more acidic (i.e., has a lower pH) than trout.

Sulfuric acid and nitric acid have multiple impacts on aquatic ecosystems, including acidification, increased nitrogen and aluminium content, and alteration of biogeochemical processes. Both the lower pH and higher aluminium concentrations in surface water that occur as a result of acid rain can cause damage to fish and other aquatic animals as well as to microbes and plants. At pH lower than 5 most fish eggs will not hatch and pH lower than 4 will kill adult fish. As lakes and rivers become more acidic, biodiversity is reduced, while it is less affected in regions where freshwater is naturally acid. Acid rain has eliminated insect life and some fish species, including the brook trout in some lakes, streams, and creeks in geographically sensitive areas, such as the Adirondack Mountains of the United States.

However, the extent to which acid rain contributes directly or indirectly via runoff from the catchment to lake and river acidity (i.e., depending on characteristics of the surrounding watershed) is variable. The United States Environmental Protection Agency's (EPA) website states: "Of the lakes and streams surveyed, acid rain caused acidity in 75% of the acidic lakes and about 50% of the acidic streams". Lakes hosted by silicate basement rocks are more acidic than lakes within limestone or other basement rocks with a carbonate composition (i.e. marble) due to buffering effects by carbonate minerals, even with the same amount of acid rain.

=== Soils ===
Soil biology and chemistry can be seriously damaged by acid rain. Some microbes are unable to tolerate changes to low pH and are killed. The enzymes of these microbes are denatured (changed in shape so they no longer function) by the acid, with attending collapse in soil functions (e.g. decomposition). The hydronium ions of acid rain also mobilize toxins, such as aluminium, and leach away essential nutrients and minerals such as magnesium.

2 H^{+} (aq) + Mg^{2+} (clay) ⇌ 2 H^{+} (clay) + Mg^{2+} (aq)

Soil chemistry can be dramatically changed when base cations, such as calcium and magnesium, are leached by acid rain, thereby affecting sensitive tree species, such as sugar maple (Acer saccharum).

Soil acidification

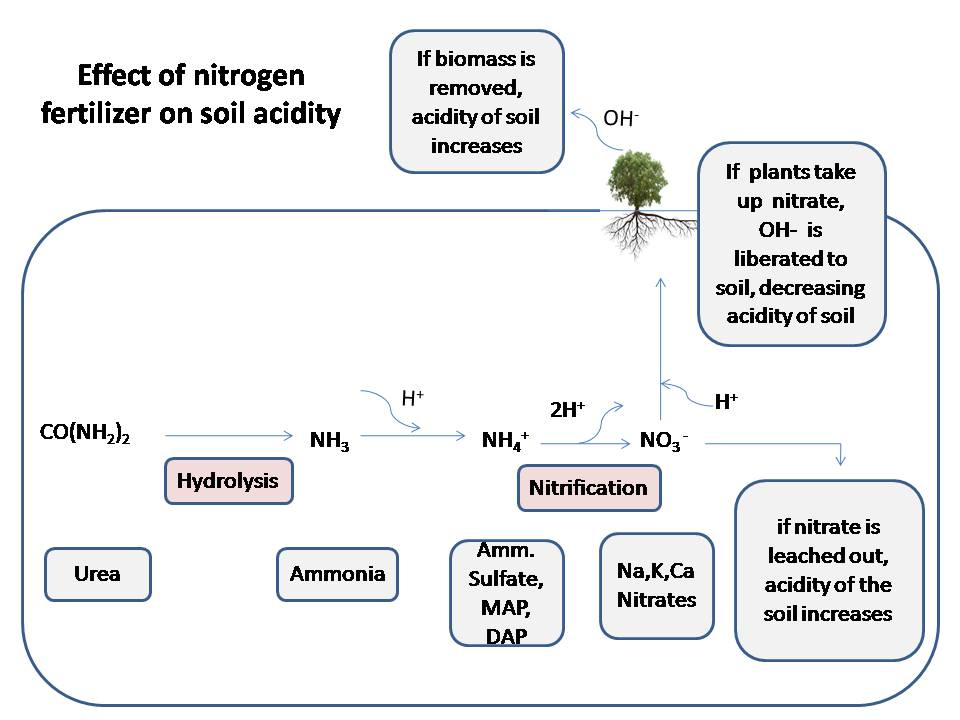
Diagram of nutrient leaching in soil with high levels of Soil acidity.

Impacts of acidic water and soil acidification on plants could be minor or in most cases major. Most minor cases which do not result in fatality of plant life can be attributed to the plants being less susceptible to acidic conditions and/or the acid rain being less potent. However, even in minor cases, the plant will eventually die due to the acidic water lowering the plant's natural pH. Acidic water enters the plant and causes important plant minerals to dissolve and get carried away; which ultimately causes the plant to die of lack of minerals for nutrition. In major cases, which are more extreme, the same process of damage occurs as in minor cases, which is removal of essential minerals, but at a much quicker rate. Likewise, acid rain that falls on soil and on plant leaves causes drying of the waxy leaf cuticle, which ultimately causes rapid water loss from the plant to the outside atmosphere and eventually results in death of the plant. Soil acidification can lead to a decline in soil microbes as a result of a change in pH, which would have an adverse effect on plants due to their dependence on soil microbes to access nutrients. To see if a plant is being affected by soil acidification, one can closely observe the plant leaves. If the leaves are green and look healthy, the soil pH is normal and acceptable for plant life. But if the plant leaves have yellowing between the veins on their leaves, that means the plant is suffering from acidification and is unhealthy. Moreover, a plant suffering from soil acidification cannot photosynthesize; the acid-water-induced process of drying out of the plant can destroy chloroplast organelles. Without being able to photosynthesize, a plant cannot create nutrients for its own survival or oxygen for the survival of aerobic organisms, which affects most species on Earth and ultimately ends the purpose of the plant's existence. It has been suggested that the collapse of photosynthesis linked to acid rain (caused by the emission of sulfur oxide from intense volcanism) could have contributed to the Permian-Triassic mass extinction.

=== Forests and other vegetation ===
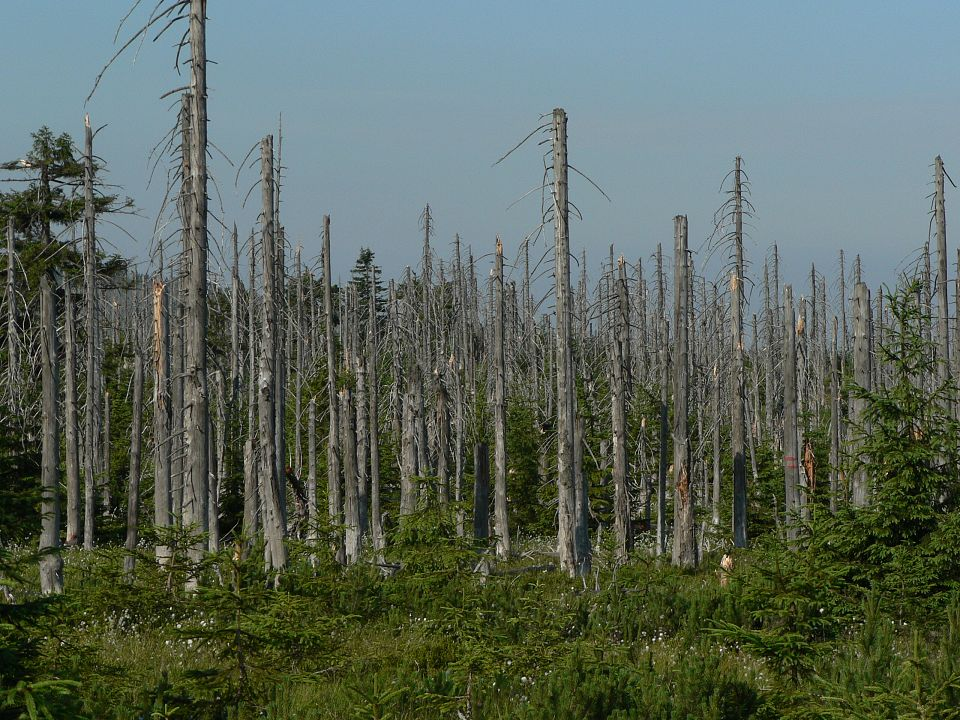
Acid rain can have severe effects on vegetation. A forest in the Black Triangle in Europe.

Adverse effects may be indirectly related to acid rain, like the acid's effects on soil (see above) or the high concentration of gaseous precursors to acid rain. High altitude forests are especially vulnerable as they are often surrounded by clouds and fog which are more acidic than rain.

Plants are capable of adapting to acid rain. On Jinyun Mountain, Chongqing, plant species were seen adapting to new environmental conditions. The affects on the species ranged from being beneficial to detrimental. With natural rainfall or mild acid rainfall, the biochemical and physiological characteristics of plant seedlings were enhanced. However, once the pH decreases below the threshold of 3.5, the acid rain can no longer be beneficial and begins to have negative affects.

Acid rain can negatively impact photosynthesis in plant leaves, when leaves are exposed to a lower pH, photosynthesis is impacted due to the decline in chlorophyll. Acid rain also has the ability to cause deformation to leaves at a cellular level, tissue scaring and changes to the stomatal, epidermis and mesophyll cells. Additional impacts of acid rain includes a decline in cuticle thickness present on the leaf surface. Because acid rain damages leaves, this directly impacts a plants ability to have a strong canopy cover, a decline in canopy cover can lead plants to be more vulnerable to diseases.

Dead or dying trees (forest dieback) often appear in areas impacted by acid rain, although other factors such as drought stress linked to global warming cannot be excluded, too. Acid rain causes aluminium to leach from the soil, posing risks to both plant and animal life. Furthermore, it strips the soil of critical minerals and nutrients necessary for tree growth.

At higher altitudes, acidic fog and clouds can deplete nutrients from tree foliage, leading to discolored or dead leaves and needles, with broadleaved species tending to be more sentitive than conifers. This depletion compromises the trees' ability to absorb sunlight, weakening them and diminishing their capacity to endure cold conditions.

Other plants can also be damaged by acid rain, but the effect on food crops is (or should be) minimized by the application of lime and fertilizers to replace lost nutrients. In cultivated areas, limestone may also be added to increase the ability of the soil to keep the pH stable through the buffering effect of calcium carbonate, but this tactic is largely unusable in the case of wilderness lands. When calcium is leached from the needles of red spruce, these trees become less cold tolerant and exhibit winter injury and even death. Acid rain may also affect crop productivity by necrosis or changes to soil nutrients, which ultimately prevent plants from reaching maturity.

=== Ocean acidification ===
Acid rain has a much less harmful effect on oceans on a global scale, but it creates an amplified impact in the shallower waters of coastal waters. Acid rain can cause the ocean's pH to fall, known as ocean acidification, making it more difficult for different coastal species to create their exoskeletons that they need to survive and escape predation. These coastal species link together as part of the ocean's food chain, and without them being a source for other marine life to feed off of, more marine life will die. Coral's limestone skeleton is particularly sensitive to pH decreases, because the calcium carbonate, a core component of the limestone skeleton, dissolves in acidic (low pH) solutions.

In addition to acidification, excess nitrogen inputs from the atmosphere promote increased growth of phytoplankton and other marine plants, which, in turn, may cause more frequent harmful algal blooms and eutrophication (the creation of oxygen-depleted "dead zones") in some parts of the ocean.

During the first decade of the 21st century, it became generally accepted that acid rain was not the only cause of ocean acidification and that its role was even lesser than the still ongoing rise in atmospheric carbon dioxide caused by fossil fuel combustion and worldwide deforestation (the so-called greenhouse effect). However, some studies on intertidal zones point to the prominence of acid rain as a cause of the observed decline in algal species richness.

=== Human health effects ===
Acid rain can negatively impact human health, especially when people breathe in particles released from acid rain. The effects of acid rain on human health are complex and may be seen in several ways, such as respiratory issues for long-term exposure and indirect exposure through contaminated food and water sources.

==== Nitrogen dioxide effects ====
Exposure to air pollutants associated with acid rain, such as nitrogen dioxide (NO_{2}), may have a negative impact on respiratory health. Water-soluble nitrogen dioxide accumulates in the tiny lung airways (bronchioles), where it is transformed into nitric and nitrous acids, causing damage to the cells of the respiratory tract by various mechanisms. Pneumonia caused by nitric acids directly damages the epithelial cells lining the airways, resulting in pulmonary edema. Exposure to nitrogen dioxide also reduces the immune response by inhibiting the generation of inflammatory cytokines by alveolar macrophages in response to bacterial infection, and more particularly in smokers. The pollutant further reduces respiratory immunity by decreasing mucociliary clearance in the lower respiratory tract, which results in a reduced ability to remove respiratory infections.

==== Sulfur trioxide effects ====
The effects of sulfur trioxide and sulfuric acid are similar because the former produces sulfuric acid when it comes into touch with the wet surfaces of your skin or respiratory system. The amount of SO_{3} breath through the mouth is larger than the amount of SO_{3} breath through the nose. When humans breathe in sulfur trioxide, small droplets of sulfuric acid will form inside the body and enter the respiratory tract to the lungs depending on the particle size. The effects of SO_{3} on the respiratory system lead to breathing difficulty in people who have asthma symptoms. Sulfur trioxide also causes very corrosive and irritation on the skin, eye, and gastrointestinal tracts when there is direct exposure to a specific concentration or long-term exposure. Consuming concentrated sulfuric acid has been known to burn the mouth and throat, erode a hole in the stomach, burns when it comes into contact with skin, make your eyes weep if it gets into them, and mortality.

=== Federal government's recommendation ===
==== Nitrogen oxides ====
A 25 parts per million (ppm) maximum for nitrogen oxides (NOx) in working air has been set by the Occupational Safety and Health Administration (OSHA) for an 8-hour workday and a 40-hour workweek. Additionally, OSHA has established a 5-ppm nitrogen dioxide exposure limit for 15 minutes in the workplace.

==== Sulfur oxides ====
The not-to-exceed limits in the air, water, soil, or food that are recommended by US regulations are often based on levels that affect animals before being modified to assist in safeguarding people. Depending on whether they employ different animal studies, have different exposure lengths (e.g., an 8-hour workday versus a 24-hour day), or for other reasons, these not-to-exceed values can vary between federal bodies.

The amount of sulfur dioxide that can be emitted into the atmosphere is capped by the EPA. This reduces the quantity of sulfur dioxide in the air that turns into sulfur trioxide and sulfuric acid. Sulfuric acid concentrations in workroom air are restricted by OSHA to 1 mg/m^{3}. Moreover, NIOSH advises a time-weighted average limit of 1 mg/m^{3}.

=== Other adverse effects ===
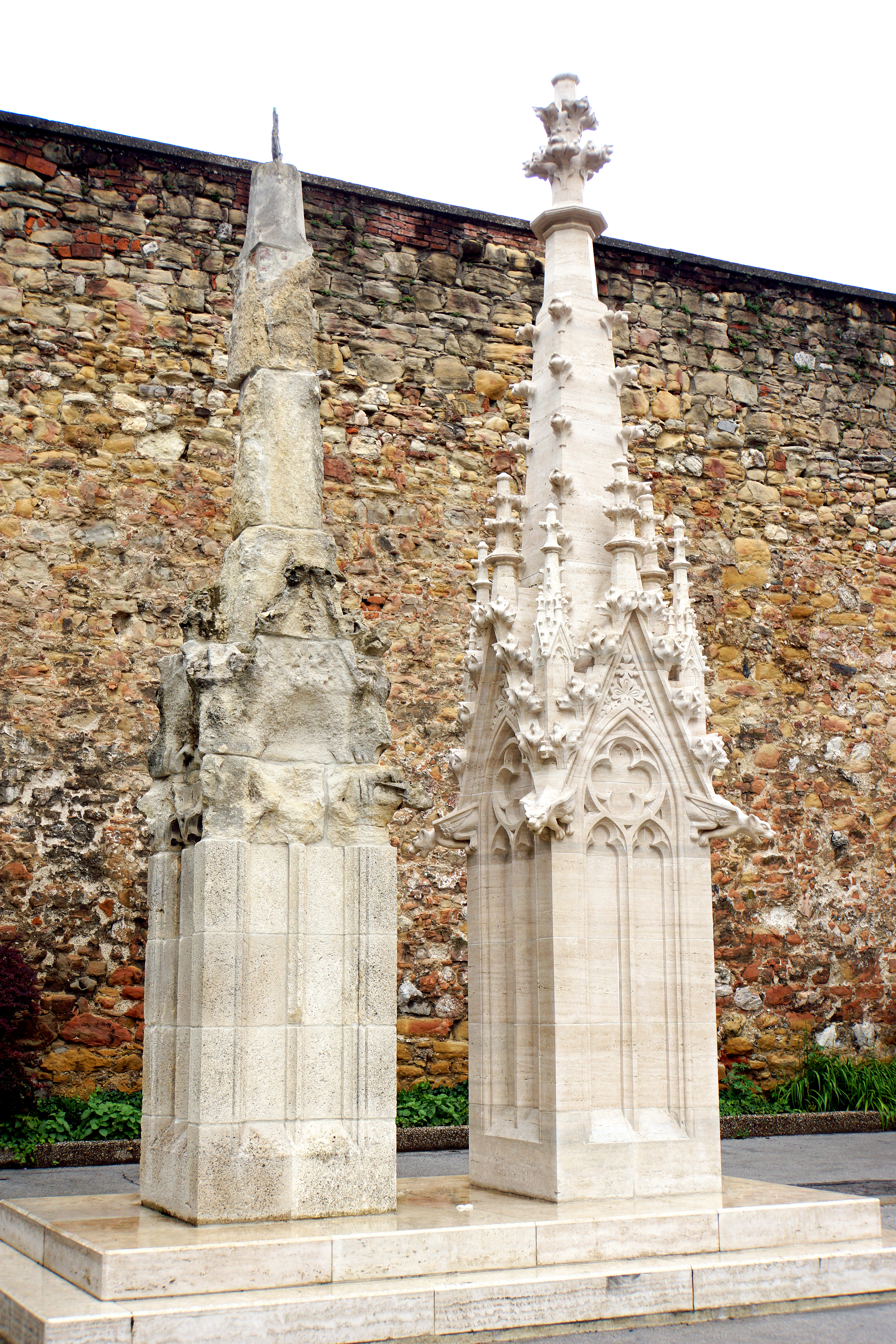
Effect of acid rain on pinnacles of Zagreb Cathedral

Acid rain can damage buildings, historic monuments, and statues, especially those made of carbonate rocks, such as limestone and marble. Acids in the rain react with the calcium compounds in the stones to create gypsum, which then flakes off.

CaCO_{3} (s) + H_{2}SO_{4} (aq) ⇌ CaSO_{4} (s) + CO_{2} (g) + H_{2}O (l)

The effects of this are commonly seen on old gravestones, where acid rain can cause the inscriptions to become completely illegible. Acid rain also increases the corrosion rate of metals, in particular iron, steel, copper and bronze.

== Affected areas ==
Places significantly impacted by acid rain around the globe include most of eastern Europe from Poland northward into Scandinavia, the eastern third of the United States, and southeastern Canada. Other affected areas include the southeastern coast of China (the Minnan Golden Triangle) and Taiwan.

== Prevention methods ==
=== Technical solutions ===
Many coal-firing power stations use flue-gas desulfurization (FGD) to remove sulfur-containing gases from their stack gases. For a typical coal-fired power station, FGD will remove 95% or more of the SO_{2} in the flue gases. An example of FGD is the wet scrubber which is commonly used. A wet scrubber is basically a reaction tower equipped with a fan that extracts hot smoke stack gases from a power plant into the tower. Lime or limestone in slurry form is also injected into the tower to mix with the stack gases and combine with the sulfur dioxide present. The calcium carbonate of the limestone produces pH-neutral calcium sulfate that is physically removed from the scrubber. That is, the scrubber turns sulfur dioxide pollution into industrial sulfates.

FGD gypsum is used in construction materials (e.g. concrete), and instead of natural gypsum it can be added to agricultural soils as a source of high-quality sulfur and calcium.

Fluidized bed combustion also reduces the amount of sulfur emitted by power production.

Vehicle emissions control reduces emissions of nitrogen oxides from motor vehicles, but measures are required to further reduce road transport emissions, more especially in Diesel vehicles.

Acid rain is now as severe a threat to the developing world, especially India and China, as it was earlier to some of the developed countries. Despite the counter measures successfully implemented in North America and western Europe, the effects of acid rain can last for generations, as the effects of pH level change can stimulate the continued leaching of undesirable chemicals into otherwise pristine water sources, killing off vulnerable insect and fish species and blocking efforts to restore native life.

=== International treaties ===
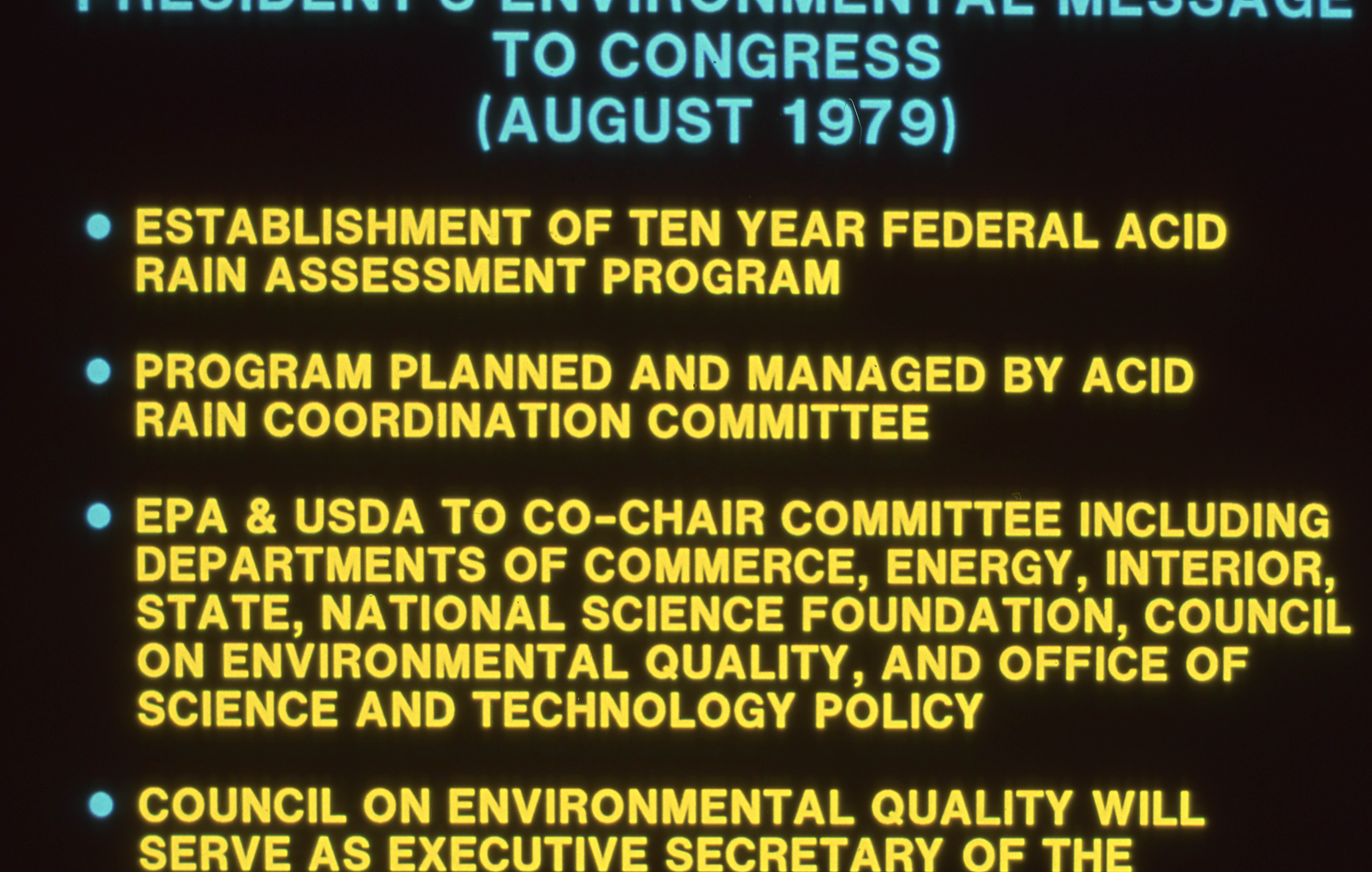
Governmental action to combat the effects of acid rain

International treaties on the long-range transport of atmospheric pollutants have been agreed upon by western countries for some time now. Beginning in 1979, European countries convened in order to ratify general principles discussed during the UNECE Convention on Long-Range Transboundary Air Pollution. The purpose was to combat long-range transboundary air pollution. The 1985 Helsinki Protocol on the Reduction of Sulphur Emissions under the Convention on Long-Range Transboundary Air Pollution furthered the results of the Convention. Results of the treaty have already come to fruition, as evidenced by emissions of particulate matter and sulphur dropping by 30-80% since 1990 in Europe and by 30-40% in North America. The effectiveness of the Convention in combatting acid rain has inspired further acts of international commitment to prevent the proliferation of atmospheric pollution. Canada and the US signed the Air Quality Agreement in 1991. Most European countries and Canada signed the treaties. Activity of the Convention on Long-Range Transboundary Air Pollution remained dormant after 1999, when 27 countries convened to further reduce the effects of acid rain. In 2000, foreign cooperation to prevent acid rain was sparked in Asia for the first time. Ten diplomats from countries ranging throughout the continent convened to discuss ways to prevent acid rain. Following these discussions, the Acid Deposition Monitoring Network in East Asia (EANET) was established in 2001 as an intergovernmental initiative to provide science-based inputs for decision makers and promote international cooperation on acid deposition in East Asia. In 2023, the EANET member countries include Cambodia, China, Indonesia, Japan, Laos, Malaysia, Mongolia, Myanmar, Philippines, South Korea, Russia, Thailand and Vietnam.

=== Emissions trading ===
In this regulatory scheme, every current polluting facility is given or may purchase on an open market an emission allowance for each unit of a designated pollutant it emits. Operators can then install pollution control equipment, and sell portions of their emission allowances they no longer need for their own operations, thereby recovering some of the capital cost of their investment in such equipment. The intention is to give operators economic incentives to install pollution controls. However, ethical arguments have been opposed to the ongoing rise of emissions trading, focusing on commodification of the atmosphere, pricing that which should not be priced, or civic responsibility.

The first emissions trading market was established in the United States by enactment of the Clean Air Act Amendments of 1990. The overall goal of the Acid Rain Program established by the Act is to achieve significant environmental and public health benefits through reductions in emissions of sulfur dioxide (SO_{2}) and nitrogen oxides (NO_{x}), the primary causes of acid rain. To achieve this goal at the lowest cost to society, the program employs both regulatory and market based approaches for controlling air pollution.

== See also ==
- Alkaline precipitation
- Citizen science – one of two 'first uses' of the term was in an acid rain campaign in 1989.
- List of environmental issues
- Lists of environmental topics
- Ocean acidification
- Rain dust (an alkaline rain)
- Soil retrogression and degradation
