= List of places named after Odin =

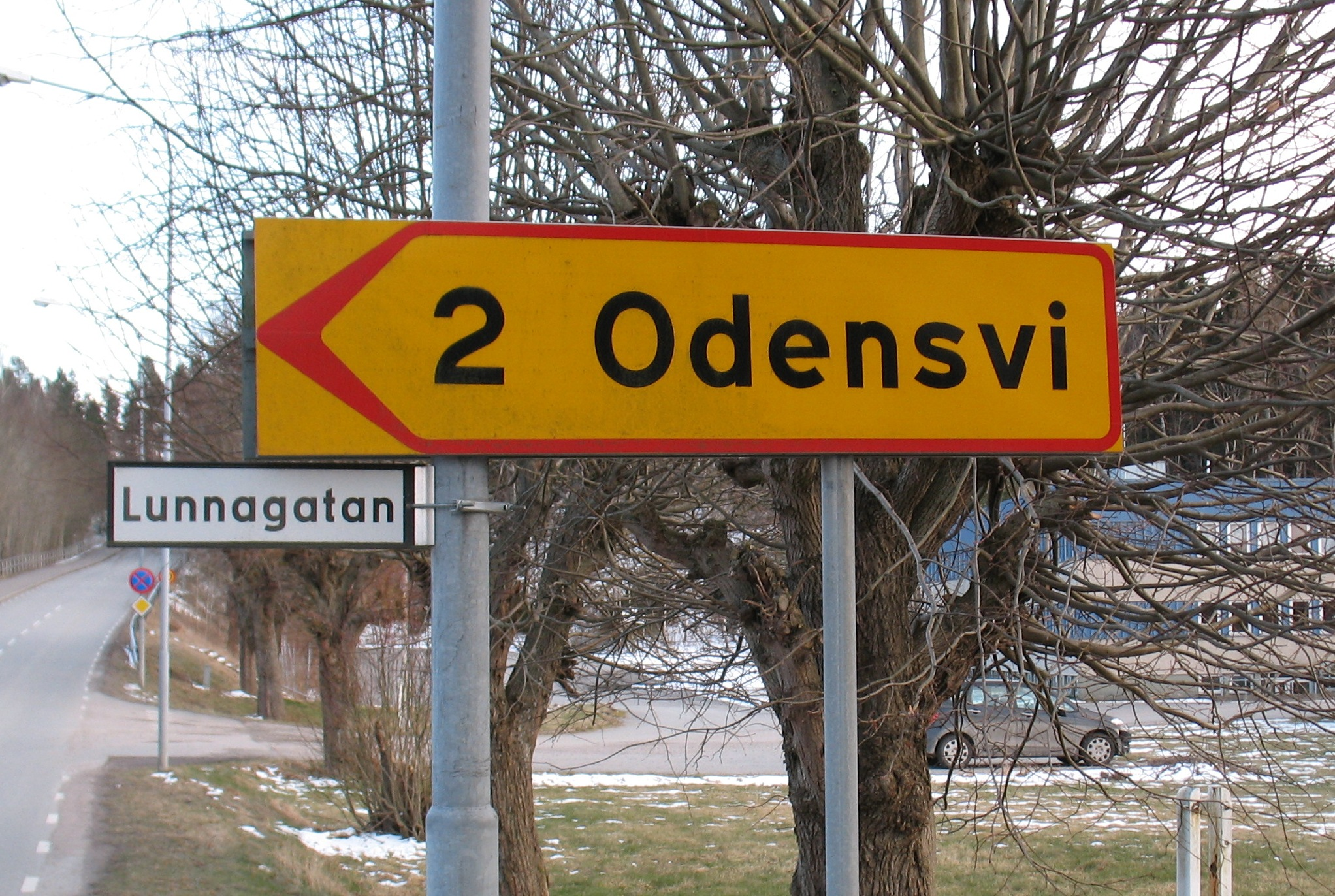
Odensvi, meaning "Odin's shrine", is one of numerous toponyms named after Odin.

Many toponyms ("place names") contain the name of Odin (Norse Óðinn, Old English Wōden, proto-Germanic Wōdanaz).

== Scandinavia, Nordic and Baltic countries ==
=== Denmark ===
- Odense
- Onsberg – formally Othensberg, "Odin's Berg".
- Onsbjerg
- Onsholt – "Odin's Holt", located in Viby, Jutland. A marked hill now covered in corn fields that was, up until about the 18th century, covered in wetlands on all sides. It was covered by a wood (a "holt") during the Viking Age. Viby may mean "the settlement by the sacred site" and contains traces of sacrifices going back 2,500 years (Note: The location contained other names such as Tyrseng ("Tyr's Meadow") which is itself located near Dødeå ("Stream of the dead" or "Dead Stream"). Religious practices associated with Odin and Tyr may have occurred in these places. Further, a spring dedicated to Holy Niels exists in the area that was likely a Christianization of prior indigenous pagan practice.).
- Onsild
- Onsved
- Othinshille
- Vojens – from "Odin's Temple".

=== Estonia ===
- Island of Osmussaar – "Odensholm" in Swedish, literally "Odin's islet".

=== Finland ===
- Island of Odensö – also known as Udensö, literally "Odin's island". Probably a medieval transformation of an original Finnic name unrelated to Odin.

=== Norway ===
- Óðinsøy ("Odin's island").

=== Sweden ===
- Odensbacken – Odin's Slope
- Odensberg, Schonen – "Odin's Berg".
- Odensvi – Odin's Sanctuary, a place name appearing in Västmanland, Närke & Småland.
- Odinslund, modern toponym
- Onsjö, Odensjö & Odensjön – Odin Lake/The Odin Lake, several places in southern Sweden
- Onslunda – Odin's Grove
- Odenplan – "Odin's Square" in Stockholm.
  - Odengatan – "Odin Street"; running past Odenplan up to Valhallavägen "Valhalla Way" in Stockholm, modern toponyms
- Odensåker, Skaraborg – Odin's Field
- Odenssala Odin's Hall or Odin's Sala, originally Odhins Harg meaning Odin's Shrine

== Mainland Europe ==
=== France ===
- Northern France around Audresselles (Oderzell) district of Marquise:
  - Audinghen –

=== Germany ===
- Bad Godesberg – originally spelt Wuodenesberg, which is "Wotan's mountain".
- Gudensberg – originally spelt Wodenesberg which means the same as above.
- Godensholt – formerly Wodensholt, Wotan's wood.
- Odisheim – in Low German: Godshem (perhaps English: Wotan's home or God's home, respectively)
- Wodensweg.
- Odenwald (disputed; most linguists disagree)

=== Netherlands ===
- Woensdrecht.
- Woensel
- Wânswert

== UK ==
=== England ===
- Odin Mine, Castleton, Derbyshire
- Odin Sitch, Castleton, Derbyshire
- Wambrook, Somerset – "Woden's Brook".
- Wampool, Hampshire – "Woden's Pool".
- Wanborough, Wiltshire – from Wôdnes-beorg, "Woden's Barrow".
- Wanborough, Surrey.
- Wansdyke – "Woden's dyke, embankment".
- Wanstead, Essex – "Woden's Stead".
- Wednesbury – "Woden's burgh".
  - Woden Road in Wednesbury.
- Wednesfield – "Woden's field".
- Wednesham, Cheshire – "Woden's Ham".
- Wensley – "Woden's meadow".
- Wembury, Devon – "Woden's Hill/Barrow" from the Old English "Wódnesbeorh".
- Woden's Barrow – also Christianized as Adam's Grave or Walker's Hill, a barrow in Wiltshire. The Old English spelling was "Wodnes-beorh".
- Woden Hill, Hampshire – a hill in Bagshot Heath.
- A valley which the West Overton–Alton road runs through was called Wodnes-denu which means "Woden's Valley".
- Wonston, Hampshire – "Woden's Town".
- Woodbridge, Suffolk – Wodenbrycge ("Woden's Bridge").
- Woodnesborough- also translates as "Woden's burgh", the centre of the town was known as "Woden's hill".
- Woodway House – from the house on Woden's Way.
- Wormshill – also derived from "Woden's hill".
- Grimsdyke – from "Grim", which means both "hooded" and "fierce", another name used for Woden.
  - Grim's Ditch – a 5–6 mile section on the Berkshire Downs, the chalk escarpment above the Oxfordshire villages of Ardington, Hendred and Chilton.
  - Grim's Ditch (Harrow) – also known as Grimsdyke. A section of Anglo-Saxon era trenches in Harrow. Frederick Goodall's house Grim's Dyke and a local school are named after the area.
  - Grim's Ditch (Hampshire) – another set of earthworks.
  - Grim's Ditch (South Oxfordshire) – Iron Age/early Roman era earthworks in Oxfordshire.
- Grimes Graves
- Grimsbury, Oxfordshire.
- Grimsbury Castle, Berkshire – hillfort occupied at least between the 3rd and 2nd Centuries B.C. Named after Woden by the Saxons.
- Grimley, Worcestershire – from the Old English "Grimanleage", which means "the wood or clearing of Grim (Woden)"
- Grimspound – an Iron Age settlement on Dartmoor.
- Grimscote – a village in Northamptonshire, "Grim's Cott"
- Grimsthorpe – a village in Lincolnshire, "Grim's Thorpe"
- Roseberry Topping – Óðins bjarg ("Odin's rock or crag", plus "topping" added later).
- The ford on the River Irwell which Regent's Bridge, Ordsall, now crosses, was traditionally called "Woden's Ford" and a nearby cave (no longer extant) was known as "Woden's Den".

=== Scotland ===
- Edin's Hall Broch, Berwickshire, sometimes Odin's Hall Broch and originally Wooden's (Woden's) Hall
- Grim's Dyke – another term used for the Antonine Wall
- Woden Law – "Woden Hill", an Iron Age hillfort in the Cheviot Hills very close to the border with Northumberland.

== Outside Europe ==
=== Australia ===
- Woden Valley, a district of Canberra.

=== Canada ===
- Mount Odin, on Baffin Island Nunavut.
- Mount Odin, British Columbia

=== United States ===
- Odin, Illinois
- Odin, Minnesota
- Odin, Missouri
- Odin, Pennsylvania, in Potter County, PA.
- Woden, Iowa
- Woden, Texas, an unincorporated community in Nacogdoches County.

== See also ==
- Toponymy
- Theophoric name
- Wednesday
- Names of Odin
