= Odinism (disambiguation) =

Odinism is a term for Heathenry, a modern pagan religion, typically used by those who hold to "folkish" or race-centric ideologies.

Odinism or Odinist may also refer to:

- Old Norse religion
- Odinist: The Destruction of Reason by Illumination, a 2007 album by Blut Aus Nord

== See also ==
- Odin (disambiguation)
- Odin Brotherhood
- Odinic Rite
- Odinist Community of Spain – Ásatrú
- Odinist Fellowship (disambiguation)
- Wodenism, Anglo-Saxon paganism
- Wotanism (disambiguation)
