= Birgitta Odén =

Swedish historian (1921–2016)

- Oden in 1987
- Born: Agnes Birgitta Odén; 11 August 1921; Uppsala, Sweden
- Died: 5 May 2016 (aged 94); Lund, Sweden
- Occupations: Historian, professor
- Spouse: Uno Duner (m. 1953)
- Children: 1
- Father: Sven Odén
- Relatives: Svante Odén (sibling)

Agnes Birgitta Odén-Dunér (11 August 1921 – 5 May 2016) was a Swedish historian. She was the first woman to hold a professorship at Lund University, and was also the first female history professor in Sweden.

== Life ==
Birgitta Oden was born on 11 August 1921 in Uppsala. She was the daughter of Professor Sven Odén and Agnes Bergman, and the sister of Svante Odén. Odén received a Master of Philosophy in 1944, a Licentiate in 1947 and a Doctor of Philosophy in Lund in 1955. She was the professor of history at Lund University from 1965 to 1987. At the time of her appointment, she was both Sweden's first female professor of history and the first ever female professor at Lund University. (Carin Boalt had been appointed as a professor at LTH the year before, which at the time was still an independent university.)

Birgitta Odén wrote her dissertation on Swedish 16th century fiscal policy. She later worked on environmental history and social history. In 1998 she received the Gerontology Prize, which is awarded by the Nordic Gerontological Society, and in 2005 she received the Great Gerontology Prize, which is awarded by the Swedish Gerontological Society.

In 1953, she married Major Uno Dunér (1886–1983), son of the bank director Fritiof Dunér and Charlotta Helena Sjöberg. Together, they had a son Mårten Dunér (born 1956), an architect.

Birgitta Oden died on 5 May 2016 in Lund, Scania. She is buried at the Kviinge Kyrka cemetery in Hanaskog, Sweden.

She was a member of several local and international literal and historical academies such as the Finnish Society of Sciences and Letters; The Science Society in Lund (honorary); the Royal Swedish Academy of Letters, History and Antiquities; the Academy of Finland; the Norwegian Academy of Science and Letters from 1977; and the Academia Europaea.

== Honors ==
- 1990 Member of the Academia Europaea
- 1999 Honorary doctorate of theology at Lund University
- 2005 Gerontologipriset

== Bibliography ==
- Lövkvist, Linda (2018). Svenskt kvinnobiografiskt lexikon, (In Swedish). University of Gothenburg. ISBN 978-91-639-7594-3.
- Grosjean, Alexia. Svenskt kvinnobiografiskt lexikon [Biographical Dictionary of Swedish Women]. University of Gothenburg. ISBN 978-91-639-7594-3.
- A Survey of Numismatic Research 1960–1965: Modern numismatics including medals, edited by N. L. Ludvig, L. O. Lagerqvist, and C. Svarstad (in French). International Numismatic Commission. 1967.
- Eva Österberg, "Birgitta Odén", Kungl Vitterhets Historie och Antikvitets Akademiens årsbok, 2017, p. 25–36.
