= Hope Valley School =

Hope Valley School can refer to:

- Hope Valley College, in the United Kingdom
- Ardtornish Primary School, in Australia, as the school held this name from 1915–1980
