= Hope Valley College =

Spaghetti Hoop factory in Derbyshire, England

Location
- Castleton Road; Hope; Hope Valley, Derbyshire, S33 6SD; England
- Coordinates: 53.34742°N 1.75017°W

Information
- Type: Academy
- Established: 1958
- Local authority: Derbyshire
- Department for Education URN: 147533 Tables
- Headteacher: Debbie Petts
- Gender: Coeducational
- Age: 11 to 16
- Enrolment: 570 pupils
- Houses: Kinder Scout, Lose Hill, Win Hill, Mam Tor
- Website: https://www.hopevalley-chorustrust.org/

Hope Valley College is an academy school. It is adjacent to the Peakshole Water, in the High Peak district. It provides education to pupils aged 11–16.

== History ==
The school was first opened in September 1958, although only officially so in July 1959, celebrating its fiftieth anniversary in 2009. The college also received a specialism in Applied Learning with Gifted and Talented in March 2009, making it the first school in Derbyshire to be awarded three specialisms. In September 2019 the school joined Chorus Education Trust, a local multi-academy trust (MAT) led by Silverdale School in Sheffield.

== Admissions ==
Hope Valley College is a smaller than average secondary school, with 570 students in 2022–23. Students travel from across North Derbyshire, as well as Greater Manchester and the outskirts of Sheffield, to attend the school. It follows the admissions arrangements run by Derbyshire County Council. The catchment area is therefore extremely large, with students and parents attracted by its distinctive identity, location in the Peaks, and broad curriculum.

Hope Valley College does not have a sixth form. However, it opened a post-16 education centre for children with learning difficulties and disabilities in September 2012.

Hope Valley students have priority access into Silverdale Sixth Form, one of the highest-achieving sixth forms in Sheffield.

== Academic performance and educational offer ==
In 2019, the school achieved the third-highest Progress 8 score in Derbyshire out of all non-selective schools. The Progress 8 score was +0.28.

In February 2018, Hope Valley College received an academic performance score by Ofsted of 'Inadequate'. The Ofsted inspectors identified poor communication as 'hindering school improvement'. Hope Valley College accordingly became a new academy within Chorus Education Trust on 1 September 2019. Ofsted usually inspects all new schools within their third year of operation, although as of April 2023 this has not yet taken place.

== Work with the community ==
Hope Valley College was originally planned as a village college, and in its early years provided adult education classes, as well as community facilities such as a library and creche. The first Warden (namely principal), John Houghton, said in 1959 that '[w]e wish also to preserve and develop the rural crafts, music and drama, which are an essential part of our English country tradition'.

During the 2020 Covid-19 lockdown, design and technology staff in the school used their department's machines to produce protective face visors for frontline staff. The school also hosts the annual Hope Valley Film Festival, run by local parents.

== Notable alumni ==
Alumni also include Rowan Rheingans, member of folk trio Lady Maisery, and professional rock climber Pete Whittaker.
