= Hilma Borelius =

Swedish literary historian and suffragette

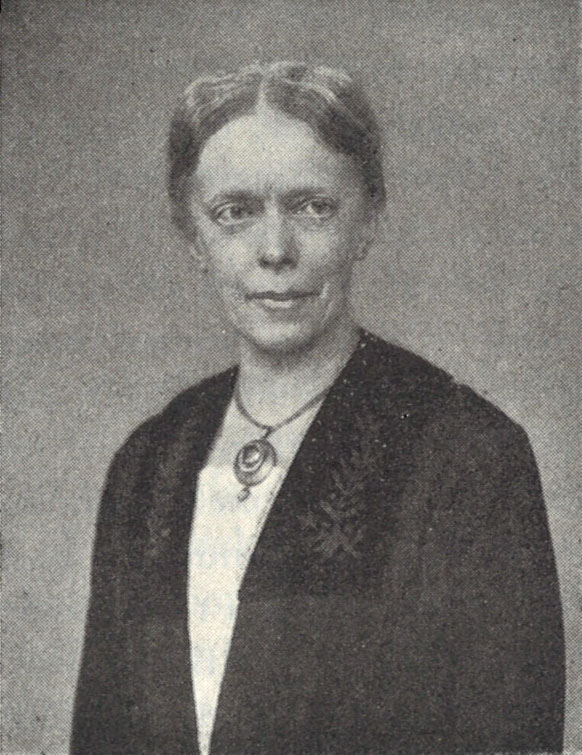
Hilma Borelius (c. 1925)

Hilma Johanna Ulrika Borelius (1869–1932) was a literary historian who became the first female docent at Lund University in 1910 and a substitute professor in 1922. In 1931 she published a history of Scandinavian literature in German: Die Nordischen Literaturen. Handbuch der Literaturwissenschaft. A strong supporter of the suffrage movement, she chaired the Lund women's association, Föreningen för kvinnans politiska rösträtt i Lund (local branch of the National Association for Women's Suffrage), from its establishment in 1903 until 1908. Borelius frequently contributed articles about female authors to the women's suffrage journals Dagny and Hertha. Throughout her life, she did all she could to strengthen the status of women in Swedish universities.

== Early life and education ==
Born in Lund on 18 December 1869, Hilma Johanna Ulrika Borelius was the daughter of the philosopher Johan Jakob Borelius (1823–1909) and his wife Hedvig Augusta Vilhelmina née Lönbohm (1839–1917). She was brought up together with her younger brother in a well-to-do home full of books, encouraged by her mother to take an interest in literature. When she was 12, she attended the Lund girls' school, receiving her school leaving certificate as a private student at the city's cathedral school in 1891. Entering Lund University the same year, she was first taught philosophy by her father before studying history of art and literature as well as Romance languages, leading to a bachelor's degree in 1895. In 1893, she had joined the newly established Uppsala female students’ association where she developed a close friendship with its chair, the historian Lydia Wahlström who was also a keen women's rights advocate. In 1900, Borelius established and chaired a women's student association in Lund, Lunds Kvinnliga Studentförening. Among those who spoke at its meetings were Amalia von Helvig, Charlotte Gilman, Rosa Mayreder and Victoria Benedictsson. Some of the talks were published in Dagny which later became Hertha.

After graduating, Borelius visited Paris with her mother and went on to study French. In 1898, she worked as a substitute teacher of French and Swedish in Mariestad advanced girls' school. She continued studying at Lund until 1901, earning a licentiate in aesthetics and history of art and literature in 1909 with a thesis on 17th-century Swedish drama. Encouraged by Wahlström, she continued her studies, earning a doctorate in May 1910 with a thesis on the writer and composer Erik Gustaf Geijer.

== Career ==
In 1910, she was the first woman at Lund University to receive the title of "docent", with a focus on recent literary history. The title confirmed academic ability but was not accompanied by a salary. As a result, Borelius continued her research at home, publishing biographies of Carl Gustaf von Brinkman and a series of journal articles. In 1922, she was delighted to have been appointed a salaried substitute professor at Lund University. She was the only woman teacher among the university's 70 academics. In 1925, she was encouraged by the German professor of literature Oscar Walzel to write a history of Scandinavian literature in German. Titled Die Nordischen Literaturen. Handbuch der Literaturwissenschaft, it was published in 1931, receiving mixed reviews.

== Women's rights ==
During her many years at Lund University, Borelius continued to be a strong supporter of women's rights, participating actively in the suffrage movement. She wrote many journal articles on women writers and contributed essays on Fredrika Bremer. As part of the Svenska Kvinnor series, she published a popular biography of the poet Hedvig Charlotta Nordenflycht. In addition to founding and chairing the Lund female students' association, she was active in Stochholm's academic women's association, Akademiskt bildade kvinnors förening. She left 50,000 Swedish crowns to the university as a means to fund scholarships for talented female students.

Hilma Borelius died in Lund on 28 January 1932. She is buried in the city's Östra kyrkogården.

== Honors ==
- Member of The Society of Sciences in Lund
