= National Acid Precipitation Assessment Program =

In United States federal environmental legislation, the National Acid Precipitation Assessment Program (NAPAP) was authorized by Congress under the Acid Precipitation Act of 1980 (P.L. 96-294, Title VII) because of concern that acidic deposition might contribute to adverse effects on aquatic systems; agriculture; forests; fish; wildlife and natural ecosystems; materials such as metals, wood, paint and masonry; and public health and welfare.

Congress also expressed concern over the potential impact from long-range transport on national and international policy.

Congress further directed that a comprehensive 10-year research plan be developed and guided by an Interagency Task Force consisting of representatives of 12 agencies, the directors of four National Laboratories, and four presidential appointees. Operational management evolved to a six-member Joint Chairs Council consisting of the Administrators of the National Oceanic and Atmospheric Administration (NOAA) and the Environmental Protection Agency (EPA); secretarial officers of the Departments of Agriculture, Energy and Interior; and the Chairman of the Council on Environmental Quality.

Other program managers include a Director for Research for executive functions, Task Group leaders reporting jointly to the Director of Research and their agencies for Coordination of research in each major subject area, and two committees composed of the Director of Research and senior representatives of the Joint Chairs Council’s agencies, i.e., the Interagency Science Committee and the Interagency Policy Committee.

== Mandate ==
According to the Congressional mandate, the research was to include programs for:

1. Identifying the sources of atmospheric emissions contributing to acid precipitation;

2. Establishing and operating a nationwide long term monitoring network to detect and measure levels of acid precipitation;

3. Research in atmospheric physics and chemistry to facilitate understanding of the processes by which atmospheric emissions are transformed into acid precipitation;

4. Development and application of atmospheric transport models to enable prediction of long range transport of substances causing acidic precipitation;

5. Defining geographic areas of impact through deposition monitoring, identification of sensitive areas, and identification of areas at risk;

6. Broadening of impact data bases through collection of existing data on water and soil chemistry and through temporal trend analysis;

7. Development of dose-response function with respect to soils, soil organisms, aquatic and amphibious organisms, crop plants, and forest plants;

8. Establishing and carrying out system studies with respect to plant physiology, aquatic ecosystems, soil chemistry systems, soil microbial system, and forest ecosystems; and

9. Economic assessments of (a) the environmental impacts caused by acidic precipitation on crops, forests, fisheries, recreational and aesthetic resources, and structures, and (b) alternative technologies to remedy or otherwise ameliorate the harmful effects which may result from acid precipitation.

== Other responsibilities ==
Other responsibilities of NAPAP include coordination and communication of the Federal program related to acidic precipitation and cooperation with international, private, and State organizations engaged in similar research.

The legislation also required reporting of results and recommendations to the Administration and Congress by the issuance of Annual Reports.

Federal agencies responded to the Act by conducting a vigorous research and development program coordinated by NAPAP. The NAPAP Interim Assessment was issued on September 17, 1987. A major assessment was issued in 1990. Following the 1990 renewal and expansion of the Clean Air Act, resources devoted to NAPAP declined.
