= Odin Sitch =

Coordinates: 53°20′42″N 1°47′01″W

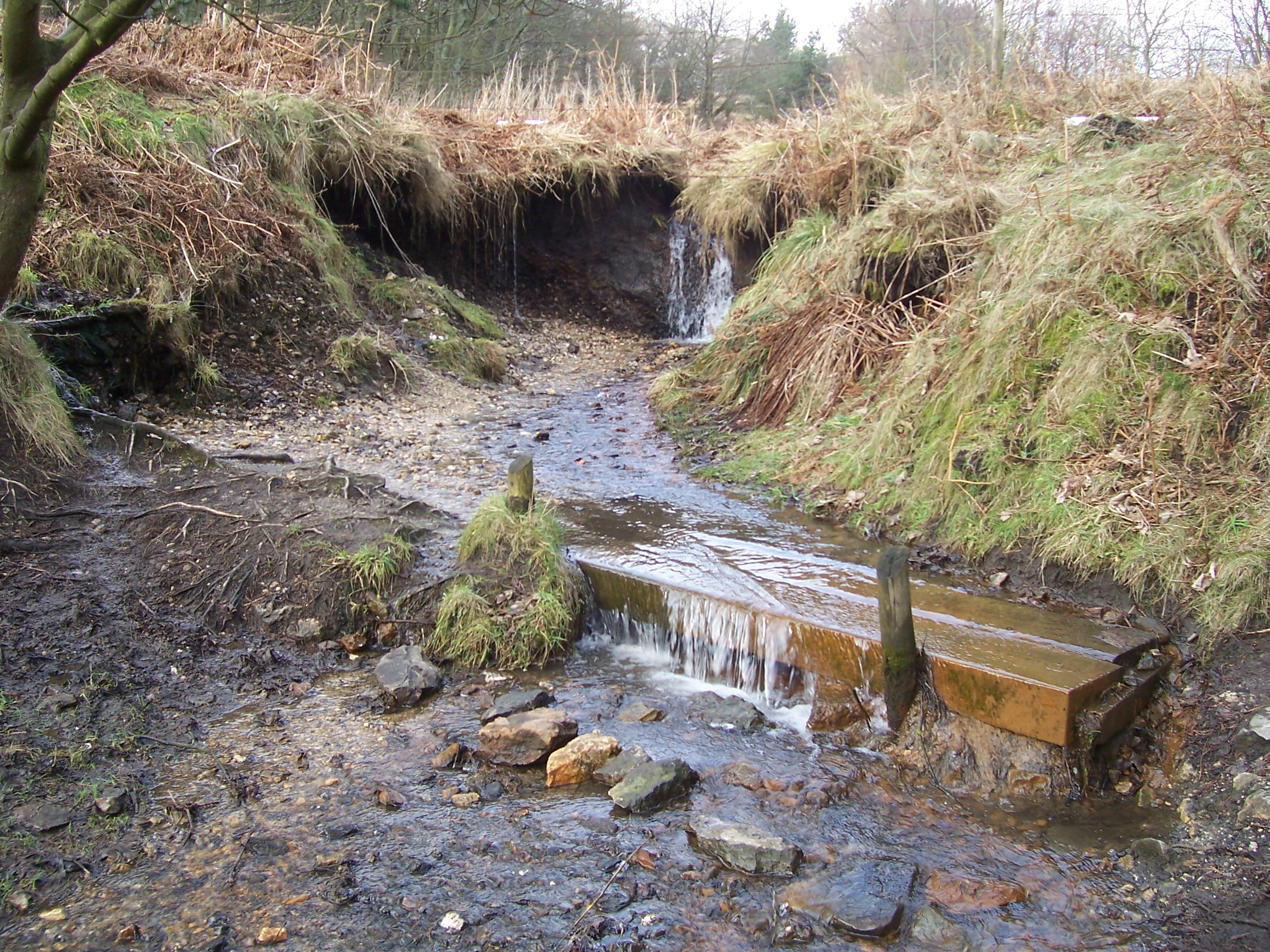
- Odin Sitch

Location
- Country: England

Physical characteristics
- Source
  - location: Odin Mine
- Mouth
  - location: Peakshole Water

Odin Sitch is a stream in the Derbyshire Peak District, originating near Odin Mine on the slopes on Mam Tor in Castleton. The stream meets Peakshole Water to the north of Castleton.

== See also ==
- List of rivers of England
