= Peakshole Water =

Coordinates: 53°20′31″N 1°46′42″W

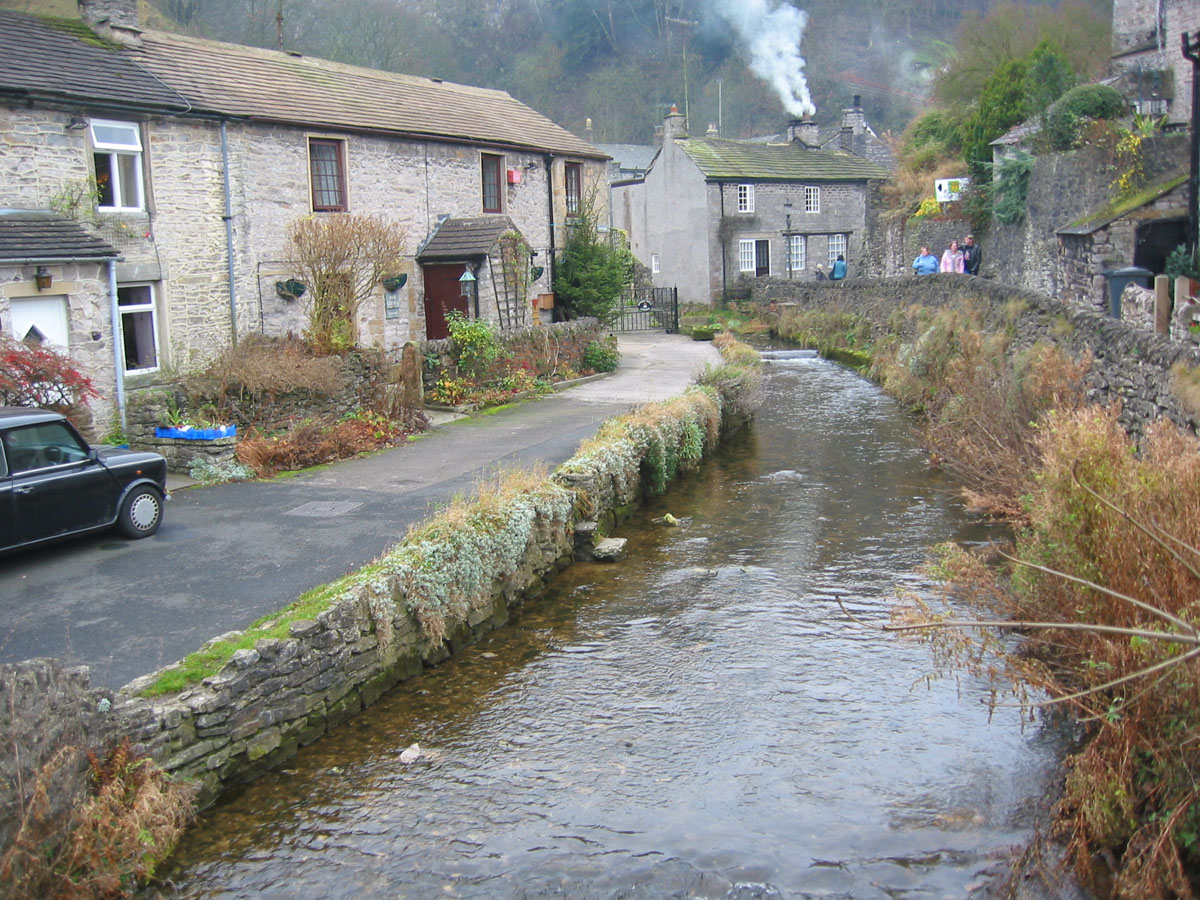
- Autumnal view of Peakshole Water near Peak Cavern in Castleton

Location
- Country: England

Physical characteristics
- Source
  - location: Peak Cavern
- Mouth
  - location: River Noe

Basin features
- Tributaries
  - left: Odin Sitch

Peakshole Water is a stream in the Derbyshire Peak District of England, named after its source, Peak Cavern. It flows through the village of Castleton to join the River Noe in nearby Hope. Despite its name, much of its flow actually emerges from the Russet Well, a resurgence in a garden on the east side of the gorge below the main Peak Cavern entrance, described as the "main resurgence of the Castleton area", which drains a series of swallets on the other side of the Pennine watershed below Rushup Edge. The resurgence has been explored by cave divers to a depth of 82 feet (25 m) but further exploration was halted by a constriction.

The River Noe flows into the Derbyshire Derwent, which in turn leads to the River Trent and thence to the Humber estuary and the North Sea.

The stream once powered a corn mill in Castleton which remained in use until about 1920. The 10–12ft diameter water wheel survived until the 1950s. Little is left of the mill, apart from the wheel pit and the mill pond. A public footpath leads from Castleton past the mill and follows close to the stream as far as Pindale Road south of Hope. The stream has one main tributary, Odin Sitch, which rises above Odin Mine on the slopes of Mam Tor and joins Peakshole Water north of the visitor centre in Castleton.

== See also ==
- List of rivers of England
