= Woden (disambiguation) =

Woden, or Odin, is the chief god of Germanic mythology.

Woden may also refer to:

- Woden, Iowa, United States
- Woden, Texas, United States
- Woden Valley, Australian Capital Territory, Australia
  - Woden Town Centre
- 2155 Wodan, an asteroid
- Woden (album), a 2012 album by Julian Cope

== See also ==
- Odin (disambiguation)
- Wodenism, Anglo-Saxon paganism
- Wotan (disambiguation)
