= Wotan (disambiguation) =

Wotan is a character in Richard Wagner's opera cycle Der Ring des Nibelungen, inspired by the Germanic god Odin.

Wotan may also refer to:

- "Wotan", an essay by Carl Jung included in Dream Analysis: Notes of the Seminar Given in 1928–1930
- Wotan (horse), an Australian racehorse
- LK Sailing, cargo ship formerly named Wotan
- MV Wotan, a German tanker in service 1913–1914 and 1915–1919
- Wotan, an A7V (tank) that was scrapped by the Allies in 1919, also a replica A7V that was built in the 1980s
- Wotan I, also known as X-Gerät, a German World War II radio navigation project
- Wotan II, also known as Y-Gerät, another German radio navigation project
- WOTAN, an antagonist in the Doctor Who franchise
- Wotan (comics), a DC Comics supervillain

== See also ==
- Odin (disambiguation)
- Woden (disambiguation)
- Wotanism (disambiguation)
