= Wotanism =

Wotanism may refer to:

- Wotanism (Guido von List), an esoteric ideology promulgated by Guido von List
- Wotansvolk, a white supremacist pagan movement
- A racial form of Heathenry

== See also ==
- Odinism (disambiguation)
- Wodenism, Anglo-Saxon paganism
- Wotan (disambiguation)
