= Carin Boalt =

Swedish professor of architecture (1912-1999)

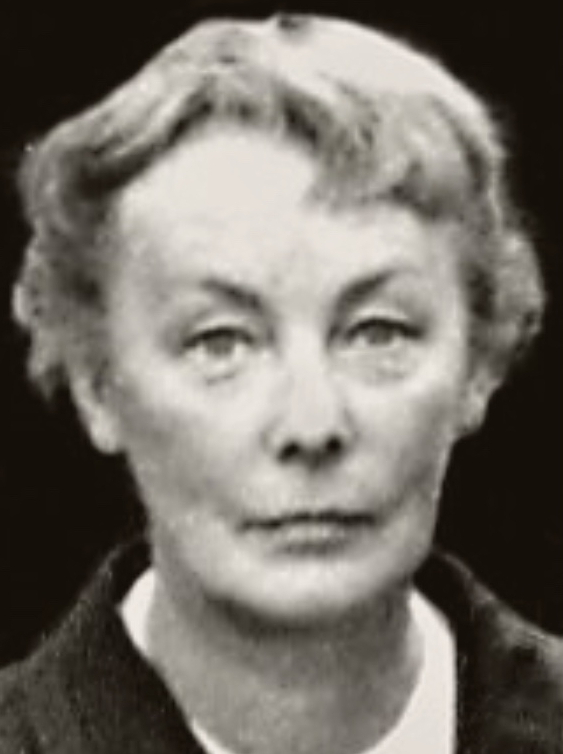
- Born: Carin Margareta Åkerman; April 19, 1912; Vårdinge parish, Sweden
- Died: April 28, 1999 (aged 87); Högalid parish, Sweden
- Title: Professor
- Spouse: Gunnar Boalt (1935-1957)
- Relatives: Brita Åkerman (sister)

Academic background
- Education: Lund University

Academic work
- Discipline: Architecture
- Sub-discipline: Building Function Analysis

Carin Margareta Boalt (née Åkerman; April 19, 1912 – April 28, 1999) was a Swedish professor of Building Function Analysis at Lund University, who at the time of her appointment was the first female professor in Lund. She was head of research at the Home Research Institute (a predecessor of the Swedish Consumer Agency) from 1944 until 1956.

== Early life and education ==
She was born Carin Margareta Åkerman on Molstaberg, Vårdinge parish (today located in Södertälje Municipality) to proprietor Karl Åkerman and his wife Lydia (née Löfström). She married sociology professor Gunnar Boalt in 1935, with whom she had five children. The couple divorced in 1957.

Boalt began her studies in Stockholm and received her master's degree in botany, zoology and chemistry from Stockholm University in 1935. She later received a licentiate degree from Lund University in 1963 after writing a thesis on the potential for innovation in households.

== Career ==
A course in nutrition at Stockholm University in 1936 led to her first job at Kooperativa Förbundet running a study on eating habits. Between 1939 and 1948 she worked as an assistant under Ernst Abramsson at the Government Institute for Public Health.

In 1944 she became head of research at the newly established Home Research Institute, where a central focus was occupational physiology studies. Conclusions of these studies included that kitchens in many homes were poorly designed. The study of the way homes are constructed is central to the field of Building Function Analysis Boalt would go on to pioneer.

After leaving the HRI in 1957 she continued studies of housework, publishing 1000 husmödrar om hemarbetet (1000 house wives on housework) in 1959 after working in collaboration with Statistics Sweden. She continued to study sociology and statistics while working for the National Institute of Building Research.

In the 1960s the newly formed Lunds Tekniska Högskola was seeking a chair in the novel field of Building Function Analysis. Boalt was selected to chair and began in 1964, making her the first female professor in Lund. Due to the field being very new she had to create much of the material herself. LTH became part of Lund University in 1969, and she remained at the university until her retirement in 1977.

=== Retirement ===
Following her retirement in 1977 she moved back to Stockholm. After her retirement she became engaged in disability rights issues, herself having become disabled following treatment for breast cancer. She also frequently engaged in foreign aid work, including a project in Tanzania. Work with disabled children in Tanzania was also a deep engagement of hers.

== Death and legacy ==
Boalt remained in Stockholm until her death, dying in 1999 at the age of 87. In 2022 politicians in Lund Municipality voted to name a road, Carin Boalts väg, after her on the Faculty of Engineering campus.
