= Odinist Fellowship =

Odinist Fellowship may refer to:

- Odinist Fellowship (United Kingdom), a British neo-völkisch Heathen organisation
- Odinist Fellowship (United States), an American neo-völkisch Heathen organization
