= U.S.–Canada Air Quality Agreement =

Environmental accord

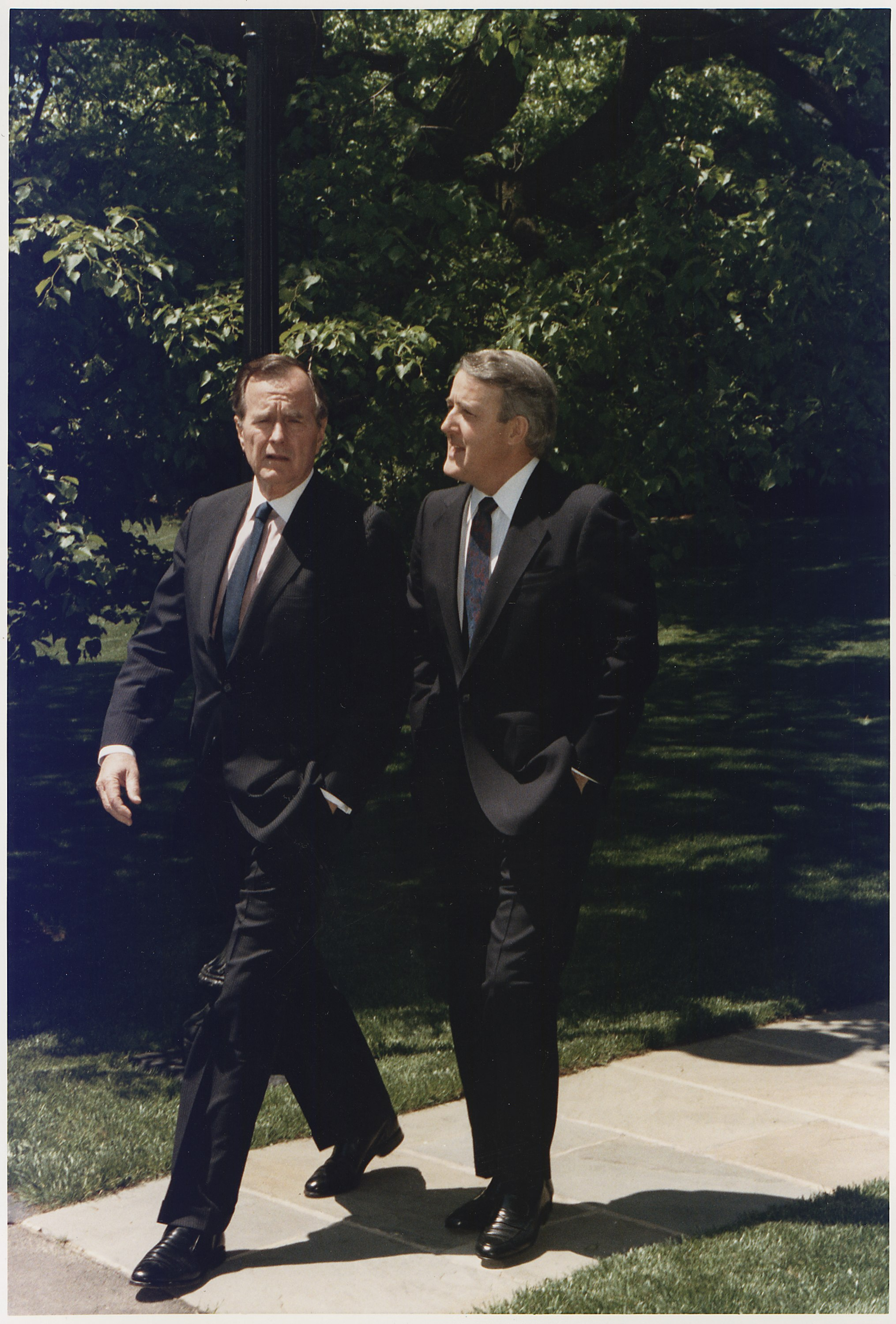
The United States 41st President George H.W. Bush (pictured on left) walks alongside Former Canadian Prime Minister Brian Mulroney (pictured on right) years prior to both leaders signing the U.S.- Canada Air Quality Agreement.

The Air Quality Agreement is an environmental treaty between Canada and the United States. It was signed on 13 March 1991 by Canadian prime minister Brian Mulroney and American President George H. W. Bush and entered into force immediately. It was popularly referred to during its negotiations as the "Acid Rain Treaty", especially in Canada. The treaty aimed at reducing toxic air pollutants primarily responsible for causing acid rain, such as sulfur dioxide ($\ce{SO2}$) and nitrogen oxide ($\ce{NOx}$). Negotiations began in 1986 when Mulroney first discussed the issue with then-president Reagan. Mulroney repeatedly pressed the issue in public meetings with Reagan in 1987 and 1988

The Government of the United States of America and the Government of Canada, hereinafter referred to as "the Parties",

Convinced that transboundary air pollution can cause significant harm to natural resources of vital environmental, cultural and economic importance, and to human health in both countries; Desiring that emissions of air pollutants from sources within their countries not result in significant transboundary air pollution; Convinced that transboundary air pollution can effectively be reduced through cooperative or coordinated action providing for controlling emissions of air pollutants in both countries; Recalling the efforts they have made to control air pollution and the improved air quality that has resulted from such efforts in both countries; Intending to address air-related issues of a global nature, such as climate change and stratospheric ozone depletion, in other fora; Reaffirming Principle 21 of the Stockholm Declaration, which provides that "States have, in accordance with the Charter of the United Nations and the principles of international law, the sovereign right to exploit their own resources pursuant to their own environmental policies, and the responsibility to ensure that activities within their jurisdiction or control do not cause damage to the environment of other States or of areas beyond the limits of national jurisdiction";

Noting their tradition of environmental cooperation as reflected in the Boundary Waters Treaty of 1909, the Trail Smelter Arbitration of 1941, the Great Lakes Water Quality Agreement of 1978, as amended, the Memorandum of Intent Concerning Transboundary Air Pollution of 1980, the 1986 Joint Report of the Special Envoys on Acid Rain, as well as the ECE Convention on Long-Range Transboundary Air Pollution of 1979;

Convinced that a healthy environment is essential to assure the well-being of present and future generations in Canada and the United States, as well as of the global community;

Have agreed as follows: ...

== The U.S. Canada Air Quality Agreement Overview ==
In 1991 The United States and Canada signed a bilateral executive agreement aimed at reducing transboundary air pollution referred to as The U.S. Canada Air Quality Agreement (AQA). A bilateral agreement occurs when two parties, in this case two countries, undertake a mutual obligation to fulfill a set goal. Transboundary air pollution occurs when pollution created in one country negatively impacting another country. The bilateral agreement has three main objectives: reducing the impacts of transboundary pollution, prioritizing health and the environment, and corroborating to ensure each country is meeting its air quality standards. By signing the agreement, both countries concur that transboundary pollution could be mitigated through collaboration and cohesive actions. An Air Quality Committee was formed responsible for reporting progress every two years. In 2007, both parties successfully reached their targets outlined in the Acid Rain Annex and the Ozone Annex, demonstrating an overall emissions decrease and effective participation from both parties.

== The Acid Rain Annex ==
The Eastern Canadian Provinces (dark green) were the focal point in Canada's mitigation plan towards minimizing acid rain in the country, and lead to the implementation of the Eastern Canada Acid Rain Program in 1985.

The United States-Canada Air Quality Agreement initially prioritized the reduction of acid rain within each country. Established in 1991, the Acid Rain Annex aimed at reducing $\ce{NOx}$ and $\ce{SO2}$, the main contributors of acid rain. The annex includes preventative measures aimed at minimizing declining air quality, visibility impairment, and actively monitoring emissions. Both countries independently sought to mitigate acid rain and its effects. Canada established the Eastern Canada Acid Rain Program in 1985 aimed at decreasing acid rain in Canada’s seven Eastern Provinces by 1994. By 1998 the Canadian Council of Ministers created the “Canada-Wide Acid Rain Strategy for Post 2000” a strategic plan set in place prioritizing human health and protecting sensitive communities affected by acid rain. The plan had four main elements: consistent reports to the public and the Ministers, reducing Sulphur Dioxide in the seven provinces, promoting continuous scientific research and monitoring, and preventive measures for non-affected areas. Canada is more vulnerable than the United States to acid rain, due to its geology and lack of compounds responsible for neutralizing acid deposition. Additionally, attributed to its downward position, Canada endures high levels of air pollution from the United States, with nearly fifty percent of pollution in Canada originating from the United States, further contributing to the formation of acid rain in Canada. The United States, in comparison, has few areas vulnerable to acid rain, with the regions being located mainly in the Northeastern regions near Canada. In 1995 the United States implemented the Acid Rain Program targeted at decreasing Sulphur Dioxide and Nitrogen Oxides. It went on to establish the first cap-and-trade program within the United States, the $\ce{SO2}$ Program, that set an $\ce{SO2}$ emissions cap on generating facilities.

== The Ozone Annex ==
The Ozone Annex is a bilateral agreement added to the U.S.-Canada Air Quality Agreement and signed on December 7, 2000. Its purpose is to reduce transboundary pollution that pollutes the tropospheric ozone and creates smog, achieved by implementing air quality regulations and decreasing emissions. Early developments of the Ozone Annex occurred in 1997 after the both parties agreed scientific cooperation was required to address ground-level ozone and particulate matter. The specific pollution targeted by the treaty includes nitrogen oxide and volatile organic compounds, the most contributing factors to the formation of smog. The final draft of the agreement delineates particular areas within the countries where the Ozone Annex would be applied, referred to as the Pollutant Emission Management Area. In the United States this area includes eighteen different states, as well as the District of Columbia, roughly affecting 40% of the American population. In Canada, the annex particularly focused on Southern and Central Ontario and the Southern Quebec region, affecting nearly 50% of the Canada population.
