= Mount Odin =

Mountain in Nunavut, Canada

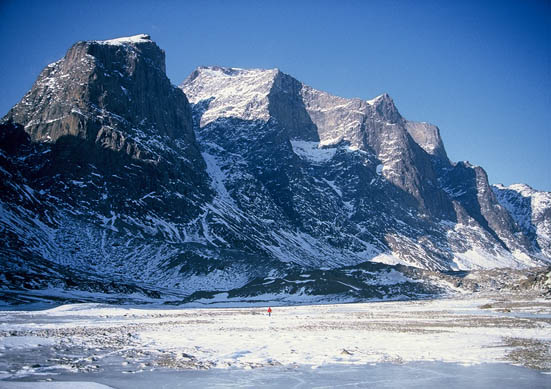
- Mount Odin snow and ice

Highest point
- Elevation: 2,147 m (7,044 ft)
- Prominence: 2,147 m (7,044 ft)
- Listing: Highest ocean islands 62nd; North America prominent peaks 77th; North America isolated peaks 24th; Canada most prominent peaks 30th; Canada most isolated peaks 7th
- Coordinates: 66°32′49″N 65°25′44″W

Geography
- Location within Nunavut
- Location: Baffin Island, Nunavut, Canada
- Parent range: Baffin Mountains
- Topo map: NTS 26I11 Mount Asgard

Climbing
- First ascent: 1953 Baird; Marmet

Mount Odin is a mountain in Qikiqtaaluk, Nunavut, Canada. It is located in Auyuittuq National Park along the Akshayuk Pass, 46 km (29 mi) north of Pangnirtung and south of Mount Asgard. Mount Odin is the highest mountain on Baffin Island.

Mount Odin is the highest mountain within the Baffin Mountains as well as the fifth-highest in the Arctic Cordillera. It has a topographic prominence of 2,147 m (7,044 ft), greater than any other mountain within the Baffin Mountains and on Baffin Island, making Odin the third-highest mountain in Nunavut by topographic prominence. Comparing absolute peaks, Mount Odin is the fifth-highest in Nunavut. The higher points in Nunavut are: Barbeau Peak on Ellesmere Island (the highest point in Nunavut at 2,616 m), two unnamed peaks on Ellesmere Island, (one at 2,347 m located at 78° 48' N, 79° 34' W and one at 2,201 m located at 80° 17' N, 75° 05' W) and Outlook Peak on Axel Heiberg Island, which at 2210 m is just 63 m higher than Mount Odin.

The mountain is named after Odin, the chief of the gods in Norse mythology and Norse paganism.

== Geography ==
Mount Odin has an impressive rocky south face that drops into the Weasel River. To the north, the area is glaciated.

== Gallery ==
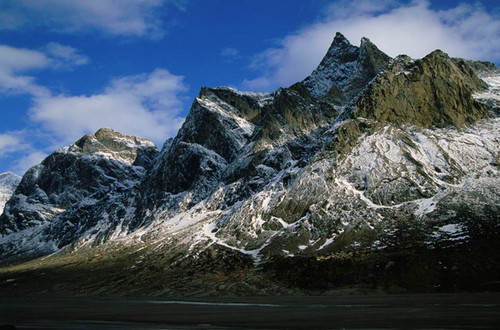
View of Mt. Odin's flanks

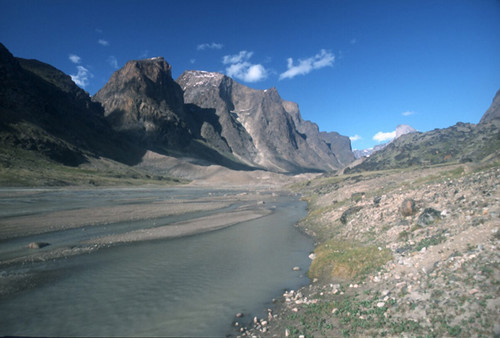
Looking down the valley at Mount Odin

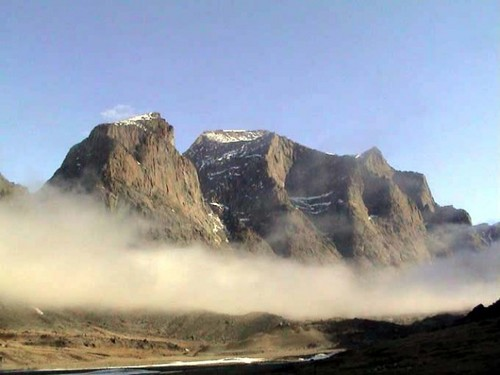
Mount Odin looming in the mists

== See also ==
- List of mountains of Canada
- List of peaks by prominence
- List of places named after Odin
