= Svante Odén =

Swedish meteorologist, soil scientist

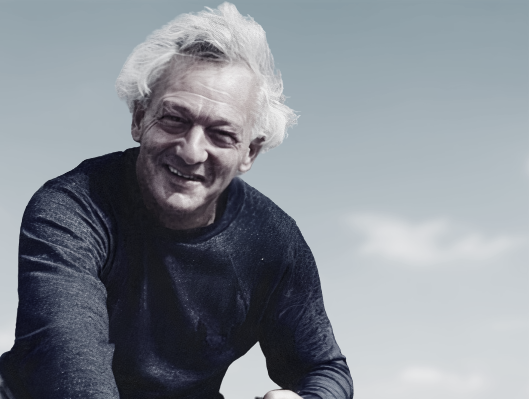
- Oden in 1967
- Born: 29 April 1924 (age 101); Oscar Parish, Stockholm, Sweden
- Disappeared: July 1986 (aged 62); Baltic Sea near the Roslagen, Stockholm archipelago, Sweden
- Status: presumed dead
- Other names: N F Svante Odén
- Occupation: Scientist
- Era: 1960s-1980s
- Known for: Environmental activism
- Father: Sven Odén
- Relatives: Birgitta Odén (sibling)

Signature
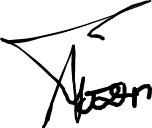

Svante Odén (29 April 1924 – disappeared July 1986) was a Swedish soil scientist, meteorologist, and chemist. Often referred to as the father of acid rain research, Odén was the professor of soil science and eco chemistry at the Swedish University of Agricultural Sciences (Sveriges lantbruksuniversitet) from 1971 to 1986. He was a pioneer of publicizing the problems of acid precipitation in Europe. In 1986, he disappeared while working on a submarine-detecting-device project in the Baltic Sea.

== Life ==
He was born on 29 April 1924, in Oscar's Parish, Stockholm, Sweden. He was the son of Sven Odén, and the brother of Swedish historian Birgitta Odén. Odén became known for publicizing the problems of acidification and acid rain.

For several years, Odén collected data on the chemicals contaminating the precipitation, lakes and land in Sweden; on 24 October 1967, he published an article in the Swedish newspaper Dagens Nyheter, entitled Nederbördens försurning (Acidification of precipitation).

He wrote in the article that precipitation in Europe over a 20-year period had gradually acidified, hence the pH value in many places had dropped to below 4.7. In his writing, he argued that the Swedish landscape was suffering from environmental degradation due to the effects of industrial activity in other countries, especially Germany and the United Kingdom.

Odén also warned of serious consequences such as fish dying off in the acidified water. The newspaper article was later followed up with several scientific reports. Odén's discoveries, which had major international impact, were the starting point for negotiations on measures to reduce sulfur emissions in Europe.

His reports suggested that industrial contaminates could travel through the atmosphere to locations very far away from the original source of the pollution.

== Disappearance ==
In late July 1986, Odén was testing a top-secret newly-invented device that could detect submarines. During this test, he disappeared in the Baltic Sea near the Roslagen, Stockholm archipelago; it is presumed that he died.

Odén's motorboat was found in good condition, but the submarine-detecting-devices and equipment were not recovered. According to the Swedish daily Svenska Dagbladet, the submarine-tracking device had received attention from the United States and Soviet Union.

For over a year, the Norrtälje police department carried out a secret investigation of Odén's disappearance—the authorities told his relatives and friends to keep silent about the matter. An investigator told the Associated Press that Odén's fate was considered to be "an ordinary disappearance" at sea. The officer added that, "It was not unusual for dead bodies to go missing, and they didn't exactly know the place where he disappeared, it was a large area of the sea." The police closed the case, giving the following summary: "Finally, it can be said that through the investigation that has taken place, it is not possible to determine exactly how Odén left the motorboat or plastic boat."

== See also ==
- List of people who disappeared mysteriously at sea
