= List of ships named Oden =

Ships called Oden include:

- Oden, a Swedish Oden-class coastal defence ship, launched in 1896
- Oden (1957 icebreaker), broken up in 1988
- Oden (1988 icebreaker), a large Swedish icebreaker, built in 1988
