= The New Society of Letters at Lund =

Scientific academy

The New Society of Letters at Lund (Vetenskapssocieteten i Lund in Swedish) is a scientific academy founded in 1920. The society's aim is to gather younger academics - Docents - in the fields of humanities, theology, social sciences, and law at Lund University in order "to promote scientific research in the humanities". The founders were the Sanskrit researcher Herbert Petersson, the folklore scholar Carl Wilhelm von Sydow, and the linguist Jöran Sahlgren, with the assistance of the historian Lauritz Weibull. The name was inspired by name of the Royal Society of Sciences in Uppsala. The society's current president and vice-president are Elsa Trolle Önnerfors and Valentin Jeutner.

Members of the society are divided into different categories: honorary members (maximum seven), domestic working members (maximum 100), foreign working members (maximum 35) and founding members (maximum 50). At the age of 55, working members transfer to the group of senior members.

A person who has shown a special commitment to the humanities and culture, or a person whom the Society finds capable of contributing to the Society's activities and development, may be appointed as a founding member. Founding members have the same rights as domestic working members. The various categories have been slightly expanded since the society was founded.

== Honorary members ==
- Göran Bexell
- Hilma Borelius
- Nils-Arvid Bringéus
- Gunnar Broberg
- Kjell Åke Modéer
- Birgitta Odén
- Eva Österberg

== See also ==
- List of members of The Science Society in Lund
