= Jan Butterfield =

American art writer and teacher (1937–2000)

- Born: Jan Van Alstine; 1937; Santa Monica, California
- Died: 2000 (aged 62–63)
- Notable work: The Art of Light and Space
- Spouse: Henry Hopkins

Jan Butterfield (1937-2000) was an American art writer, teacher and critic. She wrote extensively on twentieth century installation and craft artists, focused on those who worked in California and the American West.

== Early life and education ==
Butterfield was born Jan Van Alstine in 1937 in Santa Monica, California. She attended the University of California, Los Angeles, and graduated with a degree in Theater Arts.

== Career ==
Butterfield worked in public relations at the Los Angeles County Museum of Art from its opening in 1965 until 1970. She then moved to Fort Worth, Texas, where she held a similar position at the Modern Art Museum of Fort Worth. Butterfield also served as the art critic for the Fort Worth Star Telegram. She began teaching in 1973, and taught at the Northwood Experimental Art Institute in Dallas, Texas, the San Francisco Art Institute, San Jose State University, and Mills College. At the San Francisco Art Institute, she was the director of the extension program and the coordinator for the visiting artist program.

In 1984, Butterfield and artist Sam Francis co-founded the Lapis Press, a studio and publishing house which focused on the work of psychologist Carl Jung, as it related to art theory, and would later be known for its ultraspecialized, limited-edition works. She served as the executive director of Lapis Press from its founding until 1988.

In 1993, Butterfield's book The Art of Light and Space was published by Abbefield Press. Based on more than two decades of research, it focused on the Light and Space art movement. A "profusely illustrated, entrancing survey," it investigated "an art that takes shape through the viewer's directed perception." The book profiled Robert Irwin James Turrell, Larry Bell, Maria Nordman, Douglas Wheeler, Bruce Nauman, Eric Orr, DeWain Valentine, Susan Kaiser Vogel, and Hap Tivey.

Her archives are housed at the Archives of American Art at the Smithsonian Institution.

== Personal life ==
Butterfield was married twice. Her second husband, Henry Hopkins, served as the Museum Director at LACMA, the Museum of Fine Arts, Houston, and the San Francisco Museum of Modern Art. She died in 2000 after an extended illness.

== Works ==
- Jan Butterfield, Jim McHugh The Art of Light and Space, Abbeville Press, 1996, ISBN 9780789201713
- Robert Hudson, Allan Frumkin Gallery, 1976
- Sally Everett, ed. (1 January 1995). "The State of the Real and Reshaping the Shape of Things". Art Theory and Criticism: An Anthology of Formalist, Avant-Garde, Contextualist and Post-Modernist Thought. McFarland. pp. 139–. ISBN 978-0-7864-0140-6.
