= HNoMS Odin =

Two ships of the Royal Norwegian Navy have borne the name HNoMS Odin, after Odin, the primary god in Norse mythology:

- HNoMS Odin (1808) was a schooner built at Georgernes Verft in Bergen in 1808.
- HNoMS Odin (1939) a Sleipner-class destroyer launched in 1939 and captured by the Germans in 1940. Returned to Norway in 1945 and rebuilt as frigate in 1948.
