= Faculty of Engineering, Lund University =

Coordinates: 55°42′44″N 13°12′35″E

LTH, Faculty of Engineering
- Lunds Tekniska Högskola
- Type: Public university
- Established: 1961
- Parent institution: Lund University
- Budget: Approx. SEK 6,000 million
- Dean: Annika Olsson
- Administrative staff: 1500
- Students: 10 000
- Location: Lund, Skåne, Sweden
- Website: www.lth.se

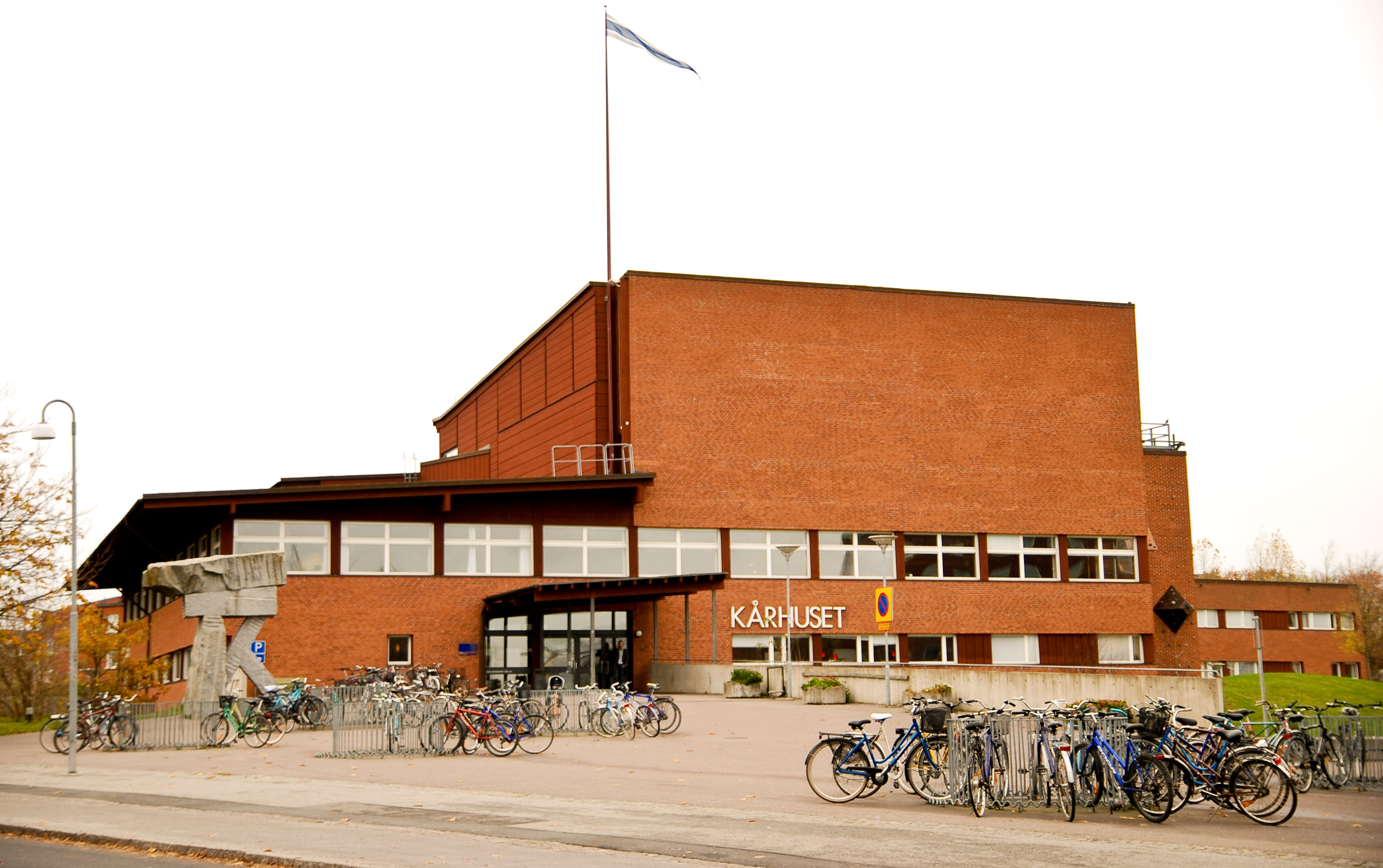
Kårhuset LTH

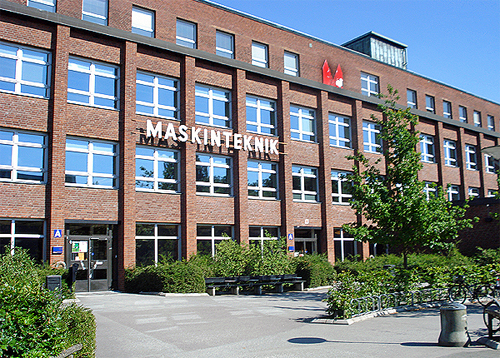
LTH maskin (mechanical eng.) front

The Faculty of Engineering is one of the eight faculties at Lund University in Lund, Sweden, commonly called LTH (after its Swedish name Lunds Tekniska Högskola).

In 2022 LTH has about 1,500 employees and nearly 10,000 students, of which about 650 graduate annually. LTH offers 16 engineering programmes, 5 higher engineering programmes and 19 international master's programmes. LTH trains civil engineers, fire engineers, architects, industrial designers and doctors of technology.

LTH's higher education engineering programmes take place at Campus Helsingborg. LTH is also known for its disaster risk management and food technology programms. Since 2010, LTH has also had a bachelor's programme for airline pilots.

First-cycle courses are as a rule offered in Swedish, while higher-level courses are often taught in English with English literature.

== History ==
Lund University of Technology was founded in 1961 and incorporated in 1969 as part of Lund University.

The university originally consisted of six sections, Engineering Physics, Mechanical Engineering, Electrical Engineering, Civil Engineering, Chemical Engineering and Architecture.

Carin Boalt became Lunds first female professor on her appointment as a professor of Building Function Analysis in 1964.

== See also ==
- Chalmers University of Technology
- KTH Royal Institute of Technology
- List of universities in Sweden
