= Josef Paul Hodin =

Czech art historian and art critic

Josef Paul Hodin (17 August 1905, Prague – 6 December 1995, London) was a Czech art historian and art critic. In 1954, he won the first international prize for art criticism at the Venice Biennale for his work on Surrealism and Francis Bacon. Hodin obtained his Doctorate at Charles University in Prague and moved to London during World War II to work as a press attaché to the Norwegian government-in-exile. His work was characterised by strong psychological analysis of the artist's character and an interest in geistesgeschichte and the zeitgeist. Hodin was a specialist in modern art and this is reflected in his published works. His papers are in the archive of the Tate Gallery.

== Honours ==
- Order of St. Olav, Norway, 1958. (for Munch studies)
- Commander of the Order of Merit, Italy, 1966.
- Grand Cross, Order of Merit, Austria, 1968.

== Selected publications ==
- Edvard Munch: Nordens genius. Stockholm: Ljus, 1948. (English: Edvard Munch. London: Thames and Hudson, 1972. ISBN 0500181284)
- The Dilemma of Being Modern: Essays on Art and Literature. London: 1956.
- Ben Nicholson: the Meaning of his Art. London: A. Tiranti, 1957.
- Barbara Hepworth. London: Lund Humphries, 1961.
- Oskar Kokoschka: The Artist and His Time: A Biographical Study. Greenwich, CT: New York Graphic Society, 1966.
- Modern Art and the Modern Mind. Cleveland: Case Western Reserve University, 1972.
