= Odin (name) =

Odin is both a surname and a given name. Notable people with the name include:

Surname

- Cécile Odin (born 1965), French cyclist
- Jaishree Odin (born 1952), academic at the University of Hawaii
- Jean Odin (1889–1975), French politician
- Jean-Marie Odin (1807–1870), French Roman Catholic missionary, first Bishop of Galveston, and second Archbishop of New Orleans
- Louise Odin (1836–1909), Swiss linguist, dialect researcher and author

Given name

- Odin Bailey, English footballer
- Odin Biron, American actor
- Odin Bjørtuft, Norwegian footballer
- Odin Hansen, Norwegian fisherman and politician
- Odin Langen (1913–1976), American politician and U.S. Representative from Minnesota
- Odin Lloyd, American football player and murder victim
- Odín Patiño, Mexican footballer
- Odin Samuels-Smith (born 2006), Jamaican footballer
- Odin Thiago Holm, Norwegian footballer
