= Odin Mine =

Disused lead mine in Derbyshire, England

- Interactive map of Odin Mine
- Location: Castleton, England, Derbyshire, United Kingdom; 53.185833°N 1.701944°W
- Products: Lead, fluorspar, barite
- Type: Lead mine
- Greatest depth: 500 metres
- Discovered: Uncertain; possibly Roman times
- Opened: 1280 (first documented mention)
- Active: 1280-1869, with gaps in production
- Closed: 1869
- Company: National Trust

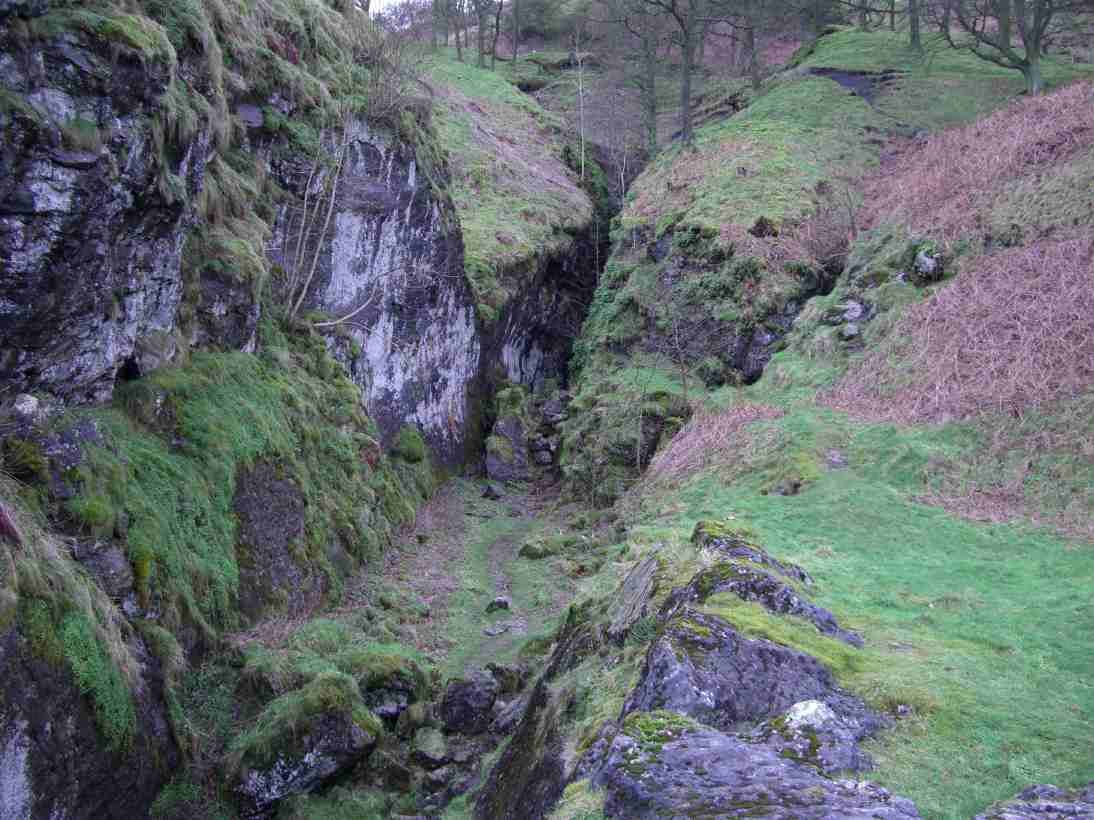
The ravine into the hillside which was the original workings

Odin Mine is a disused lead mine in the Peak District National Park, situated at grid reference SK133835. It lies on a site of 25 hectares near the village of Castleton, England. It is the oldest documented mine in Derbyshire and is thought to be one of the oldest lead mines in England. The mine is a Scheduled Ancient Monument and has biological and geological significance within the Castleton Site of Special Scientific Interest.

== History ==
The origins of Odin Mine are unclear; many Peak District guidebooks and sources say that the mine was first worked by the Romans and subsequently by the Saxons and the Danes. Trevor D. Ford states "It was probably worked in Roman times, again in the Dark Ages and in Norman times". However, there is no historical evidence to back this up. The use of the name “Odin” is often cited as evidence that the mine was named by the Danes after their chief god. This is backed up by evidence that prior to the 19th century the mine was commonly called Oden in mining records, which is more in common with the traditional Danish spelling. The first mention of the mine in official records was in 1280 when a poacher John of Bellhag was put on trial for hunting at Bactor Wood in Castleton and at the entrance to Odin Mine. In the early days before explosives, the rock was weakened by fire setting: this involved heating the rock overnight by leaving fires lit and then cooling the rock with water the next morning causing the rock to shatter.

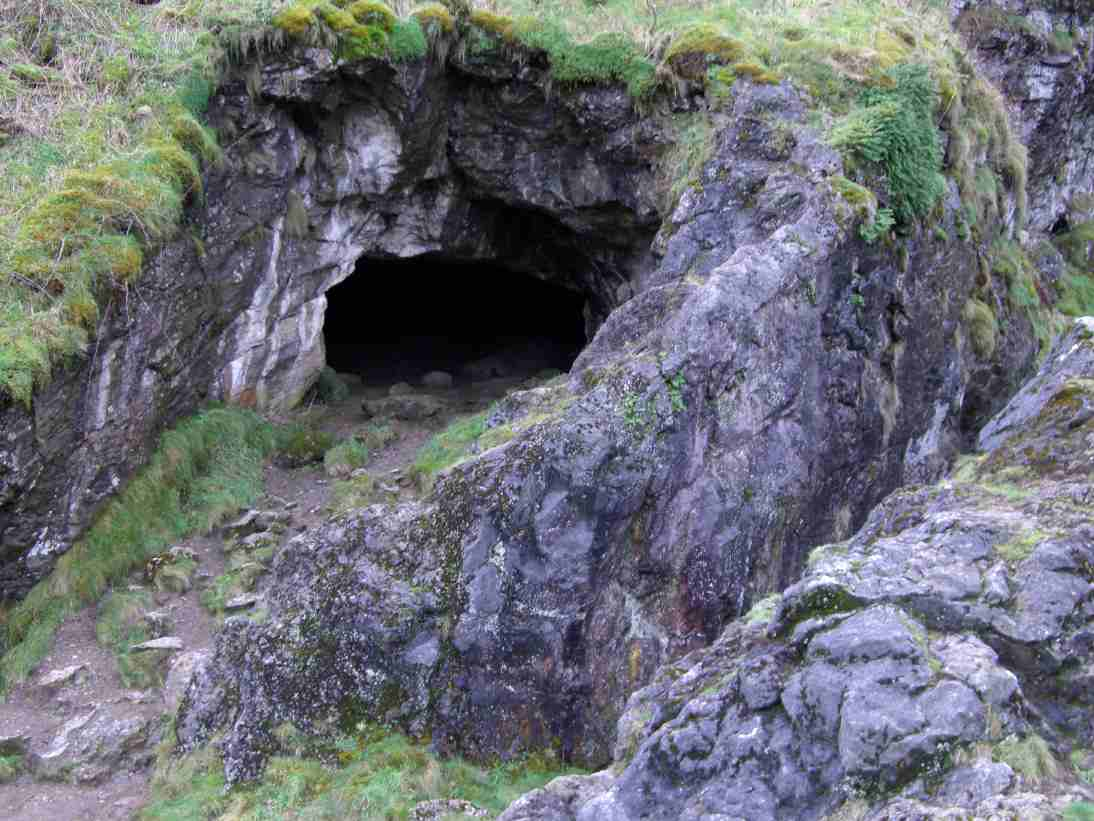
Odin Cave

The Romans had great need for lead, especially for the plumbing systems in their dwellings. They mined the ore galena extensively during their time in Britain, so it is possible that Odin Mine does have Roman origins. The mine is not mentioned again in documents until 1663. In the early 18th century Richard Bagshawe, later to become High Sheriff of Derbyshire, had a considerable stake in the mine. The Bagshawe family retained their interests at Odin until the 1850s. The mine was worked continuously throughout the 18th century with annual ore extraction varying between 100 and 800 tonnes per annum. In April 1706 a rich vein of lead was struck: 41 men and eight women were working at the site and the mine reached 500 metres into the hillside beneath Mam Tor.

Drainage problems in the mine meant that a proposal to build a low-level sough was put forward in 1772 but this was not completed for many years, probably not until the 1840s. It was driven up from Hollowford Brook at Trickett Bridge in Castleton to the workings. The mine produced extensive spoil and this was used by the Manchester and Sheffield Turnpike company in 1802 when constructing a new road between the two places. The spoil contained fluorspar, calcite, and barite which was extracted in later years when their value became known. There was a gap in production between 1848 and 1852 and the Bagshawe family withdrew their interests from the mine in September 1856, handing over ownership to Robert How Ashton of Losehill Hall. Lead production at the mine stopped in 1869, although some working took place in 1908 and 1909 when considerable amounts of fluorspar and barite were excavated from the Mam Engine Shaft.

== Geology ==
The veins of lead in the Castleton area formed 280 million years ago when a fault in the local Carboniferous limestone allowed mineralising fluids to flow into fissures in the rock, pushed up by great pressure from beneath the Earth's surface. Lead and sulphate combined to form the lead ore galena. In its heyday, the mine was a complex system of levels and shafts that extended for approximately 1500 metres into the Edale shales beneath the nearby Mam Tor. In the early days the mining was open cast, forming a gorge in the hillside with the water diverted by a leat to the north to keep the workings dry. Later the miners followed the vein of lead underground. The vein is exposed on the surface in a small limestone outcrop at the entrance to the mine and then continues underground just south of due west in the limestone under the Edale shales of Mam Tor. The 1769 plans of the mine show that there were several branch veins leading from the main lead workings. There are several small pipe caverns contained within the mine; the most prominent of these is Odin Cave (called Gank Hole by the miners) which was formed by groundwater opening out a void between limestone boulders. There is no evidence that Blue John was ever mined at Odin although the adjacent Treak Cliff Cavern regularly mines the rock in areas not open to visitors.

== The site today ==
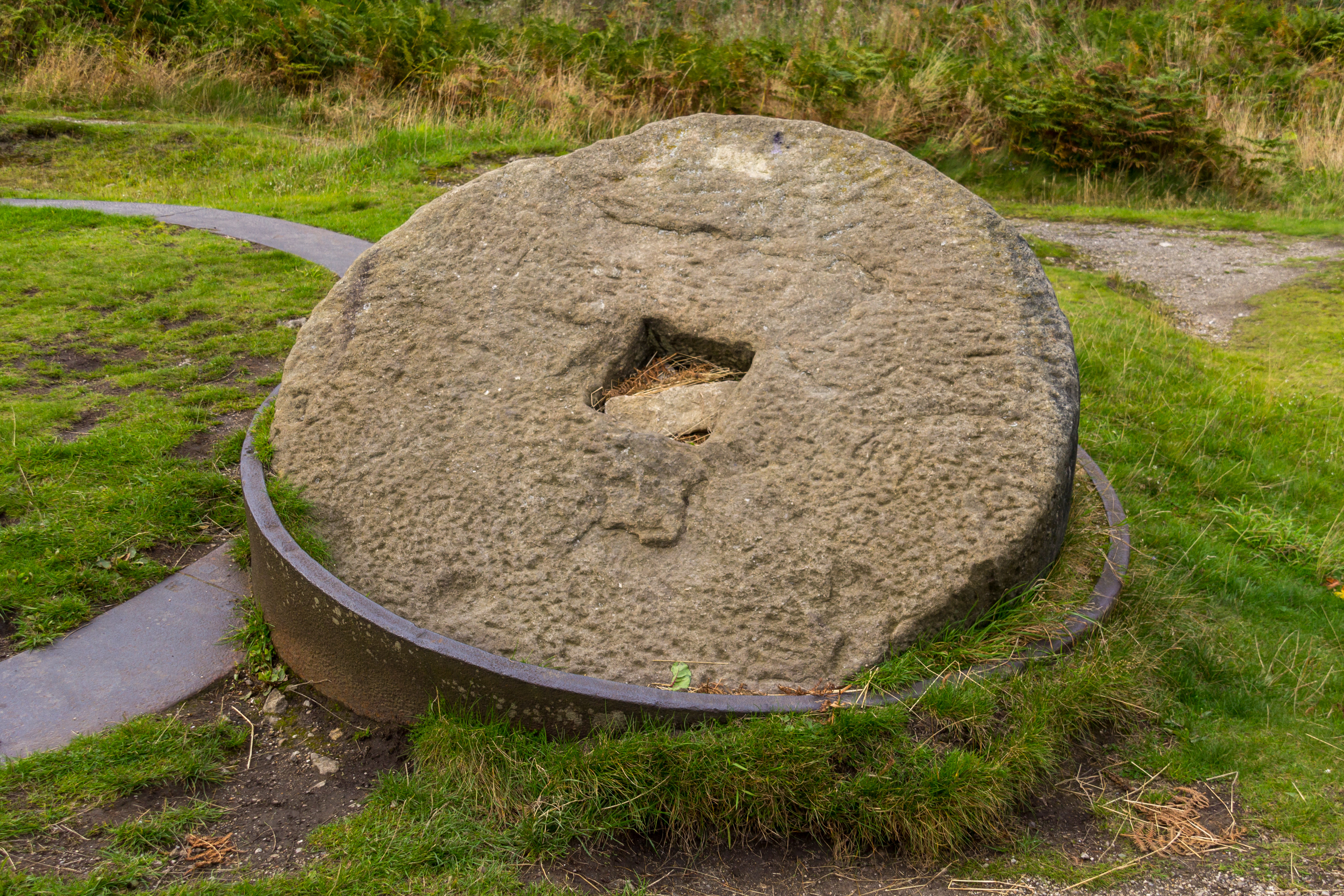
The crushing wheel

The site of Odin Mine is owned by the National Trust. It consists of a limestone gorge, the original early workings before they went underground to follow the veins of ore. It looks like a natural limestone ravine with the workings now disguised by natural vegetation. To the left of the gorge is the two-metre-wide Odin Cave, which goes about 10 metres underground. The remaining spoil heaps are a protected archaeological site and support a wide variety of plants including Birdsfoot Trefoil, Eyebright, Wild thyme and the Common spotted orchid. Some plants called metallophytes can tolerate the high levels of metal in the soil: these include Spring Sandwort and Alpine Scurvy-grass. A gritstone crushing wheel, 1.75 metres in diameter with its iron tyre and circular iron track, used to crush the ore, can still be seen at the site. The crusher was built in 1823 at a cost of £40.

== See also ==
- Derbyshire lead mining history
