= 2003 =

2003 in various calendars
- Gregorian calendar: 2003; MMIII
- Ab urbe condita: 2756
- Armenian calendar: 1452; ԹՎ ՌՆԾԲ
- Assyrian calendar: 6753
- Baháʼí calendar: 159–160
- Balinese saka calendar: 1924–1925
- Bengali calendar: 1409–1410
- Berber calendar: 2953
- British Regnal year: 51 Eliz. 2 – 52 Eliz. 2
- Buddhist calendar: 2547
- Burmese calendar: 1365
- Byzantine calendar: 7511–7512
- Chinese calendar: 壬午年 (Water Horse); 4700 or 4493 — to — 癸未年 (Water Goat); 4701 or 4494
- Coptic calendar: 1719–1720
- Discordian calendar: 3169
- Ethiopian calendar: 1995–1996
- Hebrew calendar: 5763–5764
- Hindu calendars
- Vikram Samvat: 2059–2060
- Shaka Samvat: 1924–1925
- Kali Yuga: 5103–5104
- Holocene calendar: 12003
- Igbo calendar: 1003–1004
- Iranian calendar: 1381–1382
- Islamic calendar: 1423–1424
- Japanese calendar: Heisei 15 (平成１５年)
- Javanese calendar: 1935–1936
- Juche calendar: 92
- Julian calendar: Gregorian minus 13 days
- Korean calendar: 4336
- Minguo calendar: ROC 92 民國92年
- Nanakshahi calendar: 535
- Thai solar calendar: 2546
- Tibetan calendar: ཆུ་ཕོ་རྟ་ལོ་ (male Water-Horse); 2129 or 1748 or 976 — to — ཆུ་མོ་ལུག་ལོ་ (female Water-Sheep); 2130 or 1749 or 977
- Unix time: 1041379200 – 1072915199

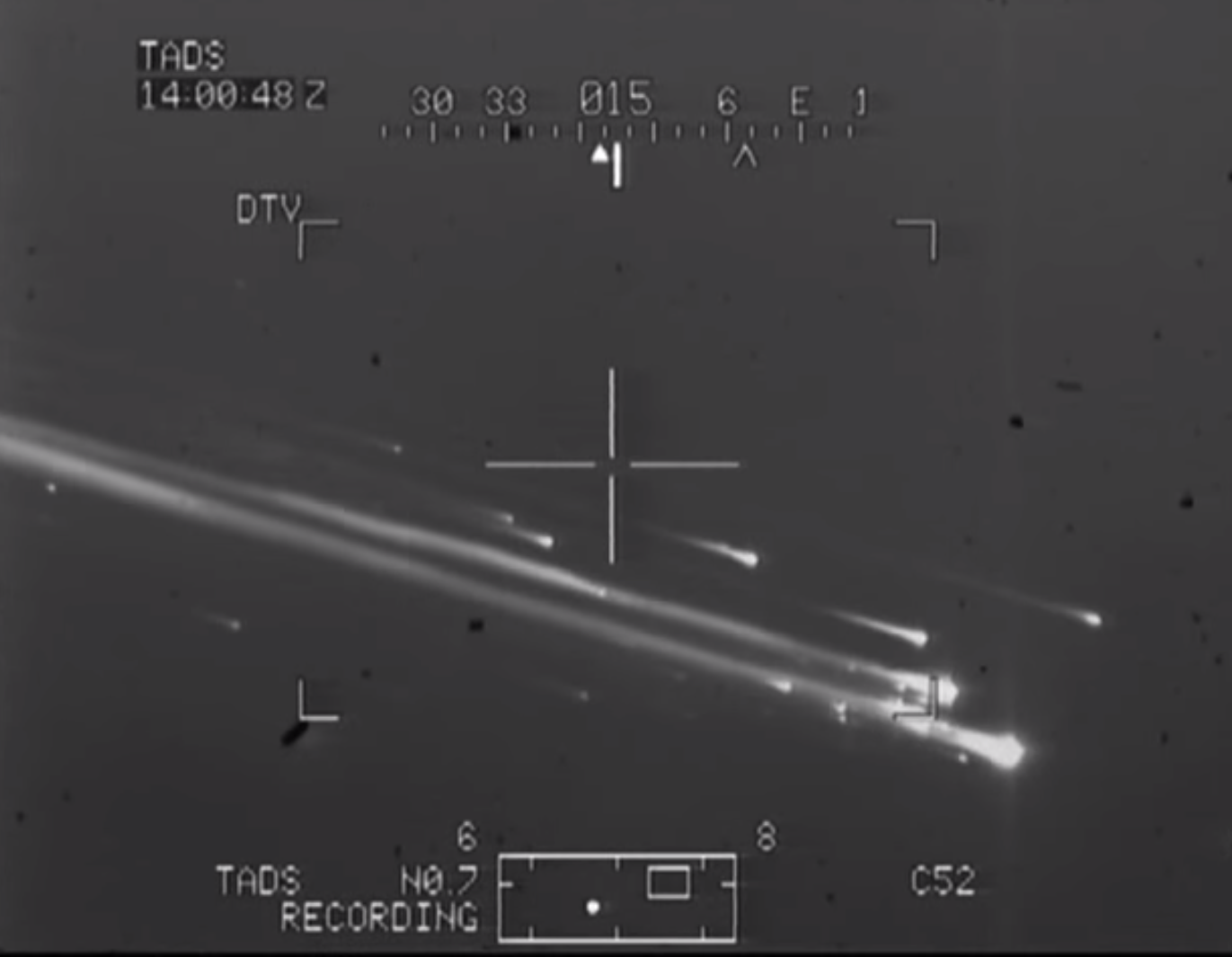
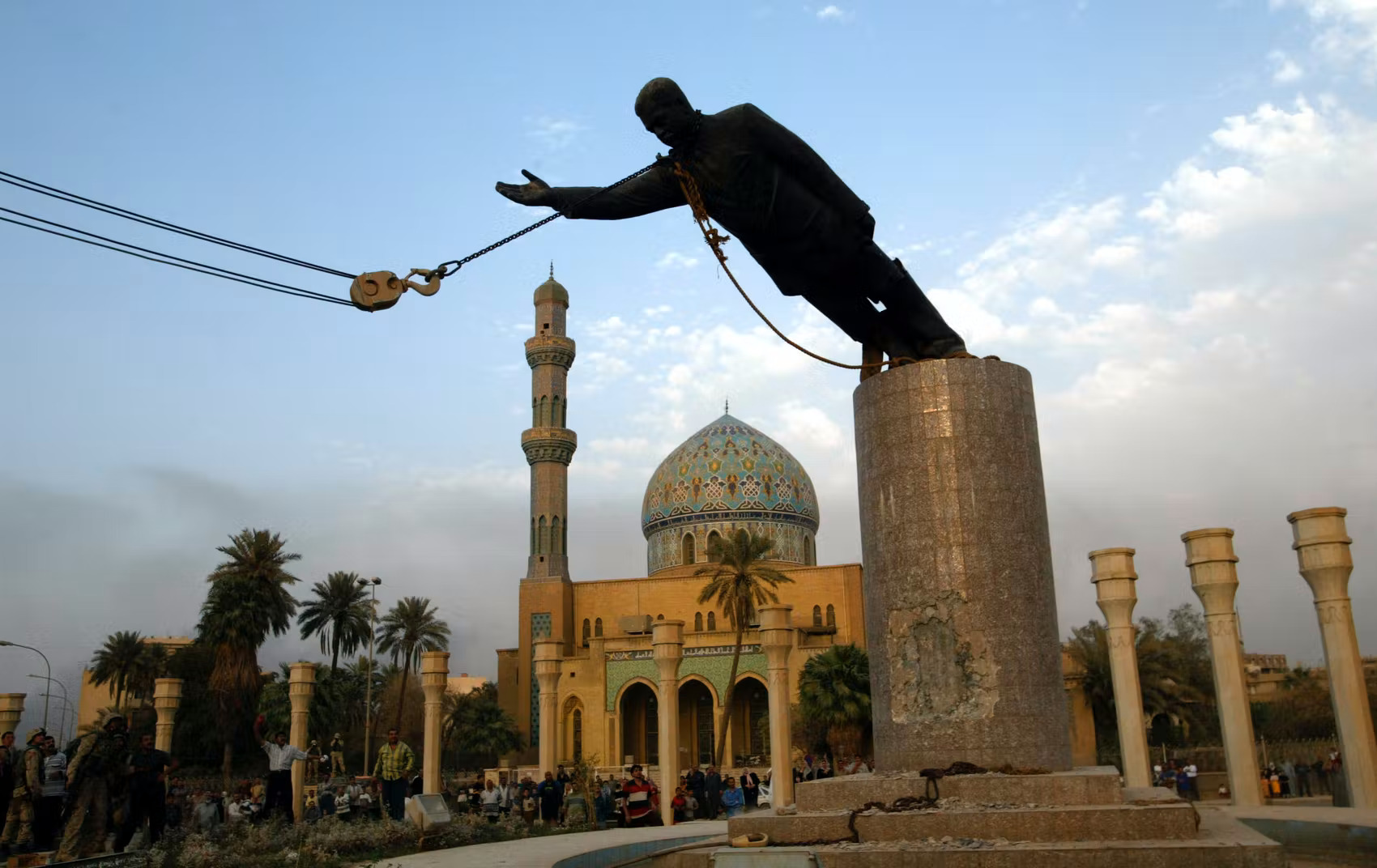
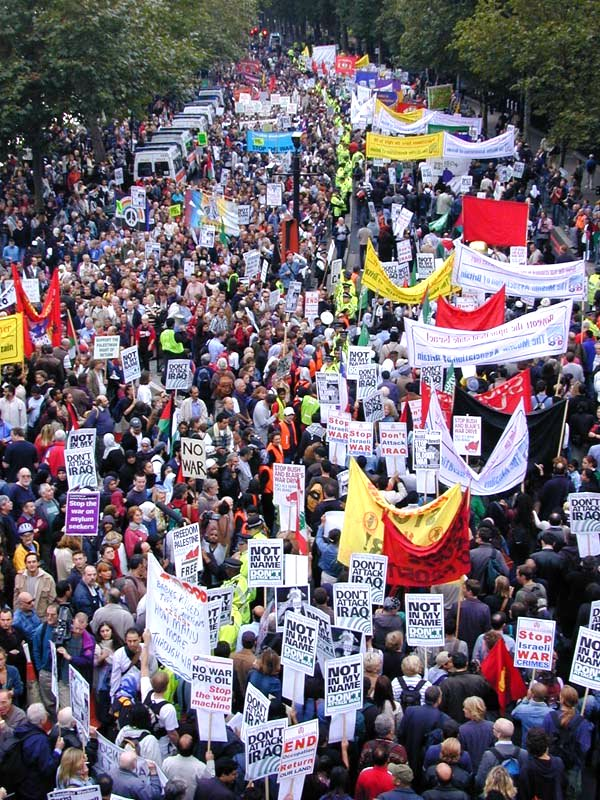
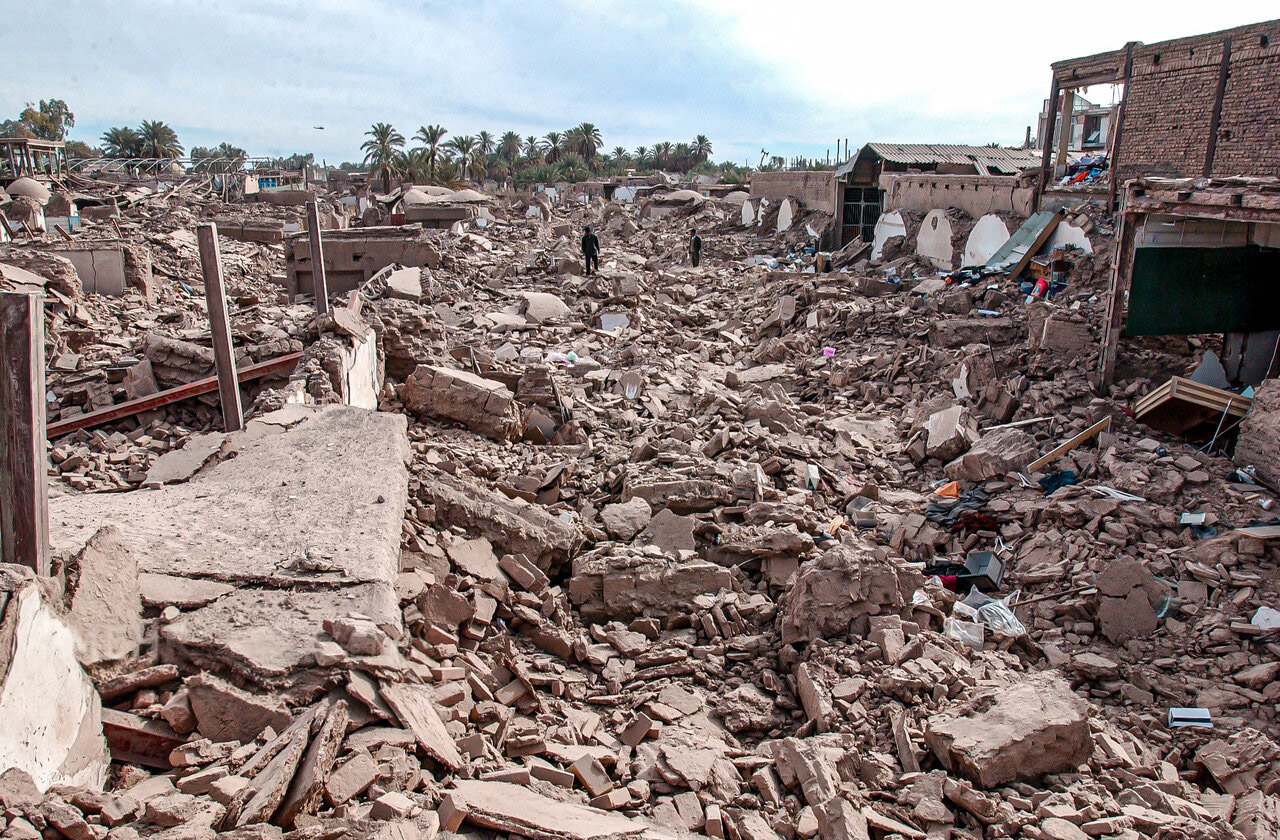
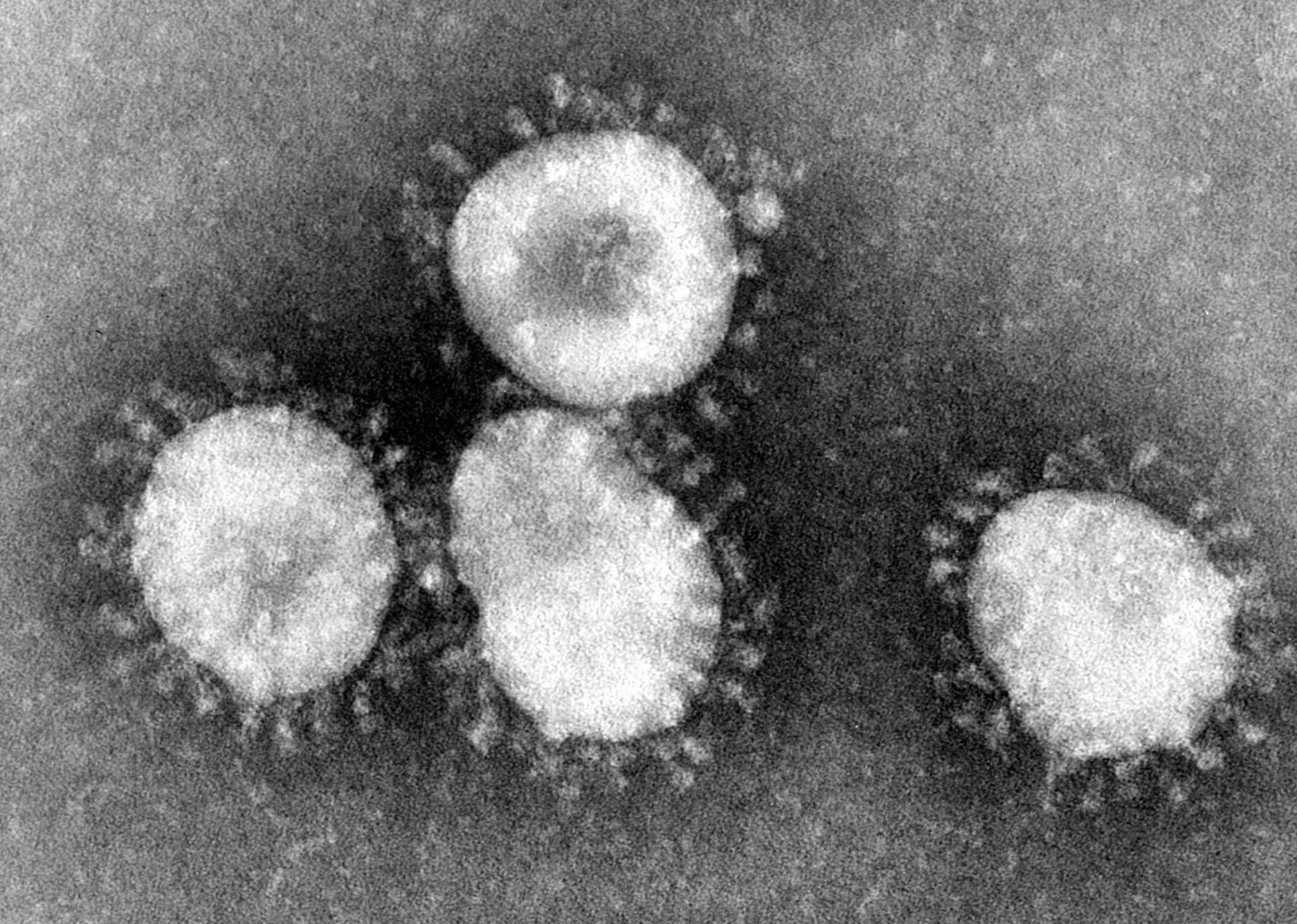
From top to bottom, left to right:
- The crew of STS-107 perish when the Space Shuttle Columbia disintegrates during reentry into Earth's atmosphere;
- United States and allies invade Iraq, disposing Saddam Hussein's regime, later the war evolved into an Islamist insurgency;
- A Protest against the Iraq war in London;
- Yang Liwei entered low Earth orbit aboard Shenzhou 5, China became the third country in the world to have independent human spaceflight capability;
- The Darfur Genocide is carried out by the Sudanese government;
- Destruction in Bam, Iran following an earthquake where over 30,000 people died;
- Myspace becomes one of the first major social media platforms;
- A drained river in France during the European heatwave;
- The 2002–2004 SARS outbreak in China becomes an epidemic.

2003 (MMIII) was a common year starting on Wednesday of the Gregorian calendar, the 2003rd year of the Common Era (CE) and Anno Domini (AD) designations, the 3rd year of the 3rd millennium and the 21st century, and the 4th year of the 2000s decade.

The year 2003 was marked by the United States invasion of Iraq and the subsequent period of occupation and insurgency. The Kashmir conflict also saw a period of escalation, and the Second Intifada continued in Israel and Palestine. The global economy recovered from the early 2000s recession, especially in China, Japan, and the United States, and Argentina recovered from its years-long economic crisis. A conference of World Trade Organization members caused diplomatic conflict between developing and developed nations, with the former creating their own trade bloc, the G20 developing nations. The Catholic Church celebrated the 25th anniversary of the election of Pope John Paul II, while disputes about gay rights emerged within several Christian denominations in 2003. The Islamic world faced crisis as the war on terror and Islamic terrorism prompted religious leaders to define Islam's identity. Elsewhere in the world, ten nations were approved for membership to the European Union, North Korea restarted its nuclear weapons program, and several political leaders were convicted in the International Criminal Tribunals for Rwanda and for the former Yugoslavia. The International Criminal Court also began operation in 2003.

The 110th element of the periodic table was officially named darmstadtium (Ds) in 2003. The Human Genome Project announced that it had finished mapping the human genome, while controversies regarding human cloning and genetically modified crops caused political turmoil around the scientific community. A new dinosaur, Rajasaurus narmadensis, was described. Space travel was affected by the explosion of the Space Shuttle Columbia that killed seven astronauts, while a close approach from Mars allowed several landers and rovers to be launched toward the planet. Consumers saw the launch of the iTunes Store and the publication of Harry Potter and the Order of the Phoenix, while products like camera phones, 64-bit computers, LCD television, and broadband internet achieved widespread popularity. Email spam became a growing problem in 2003, leading to legislation in several countries.

The year 2003 tied with 2002 as the second-hottest year on record. SARS became an epidemic for several months in 2003, centered in Guangdong and Hong Kong, while concerns about polio and measles outbreaks in West Africa and Uganda, respectively, led to massive child vaccination drives that saw entire populations inoculated. The city of Bam, Iran, was almost entirely destroyed in 2003 following a magnitude 6.6 earthquake.

== Population ==
The world population on January 1, 2003, was estimated to be 6.272 billion people and increased to 6.353 billion people by January 1, 2004. An estimated 134.0 million births and 52.5 million deaths took place in 2003. The average global life expectancy was 67.1 years, an increase of 0.3 years from 2002. There were approximately 10.6 million global refugees at the beginning of 2003, and the number was reduced to 9.7 million refugees by the end of the year. Afghanistan was the largest source of refugees, with a total of 2.1 million at the end of the year.

== Conflicts ==
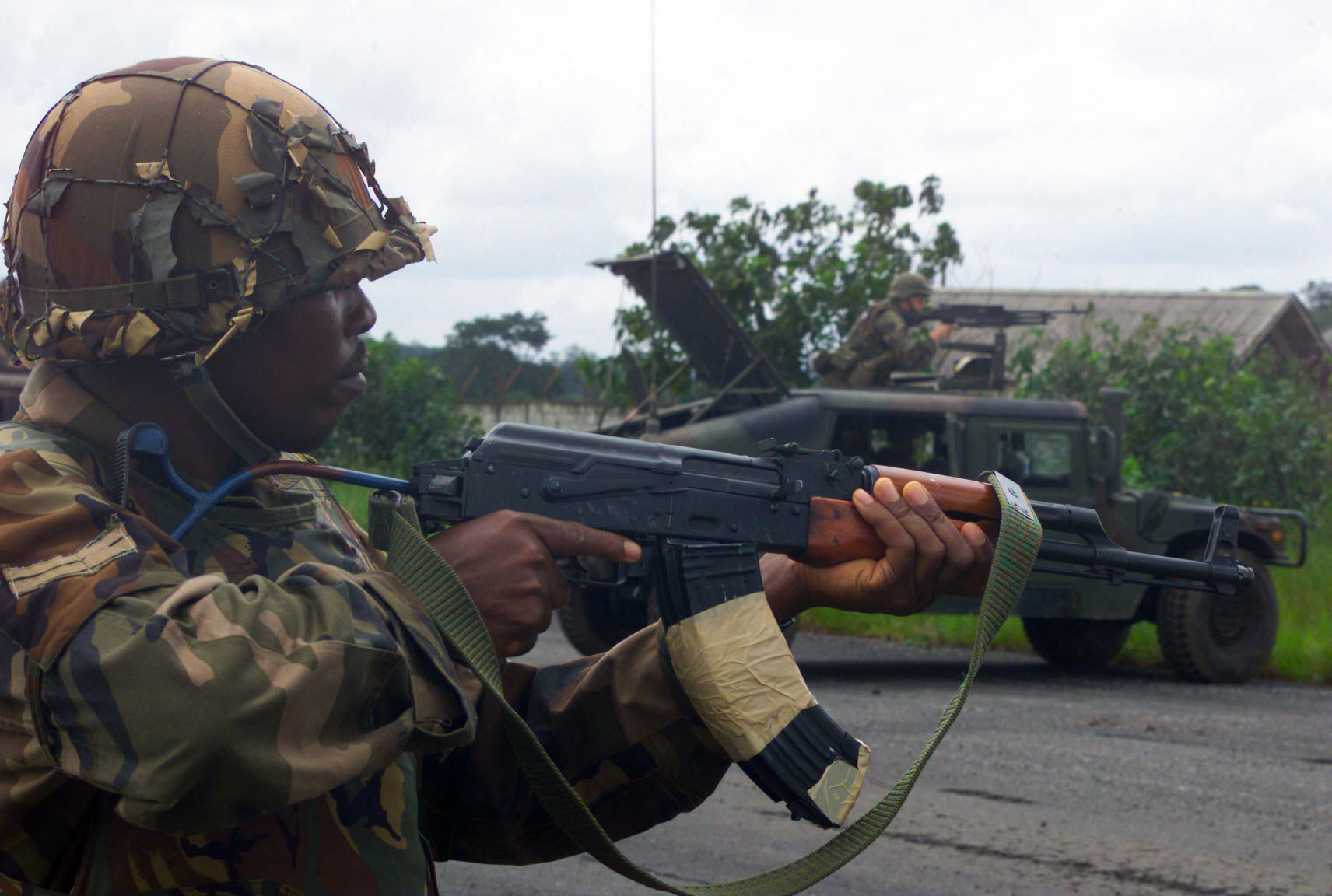
American and West African soldiers were deployed in Liberia as a joint task force in the Second Liberian Civil War.

There were 29 armed conflicts with at least 25 fatalities in 2003. The deadliest conflicts were the invasion of Iraq, the Kashmir insurgency, the Second Liberian Civil War, the Nepalese Civil War, and the War in Darfur.

The European Union engaged in its first military operation when it sent peacekeepers to Macedonia and its first operation outside of Europe when it sent 1,500 soldiers to enforce a ceasefire in the Democratic Republic of the Congo until operations were taken over by the UN mission MONUSCO. NATO launched its first operation outside of Europe or North America when it took command of the International Security Assistance Force in the fight against the Taliban insurgency. ECOWAS peacekeepers and American marines were deployed to Liberia when civil war resumed in August, until the United Nations Mission in Liberia took over operations in September.

=== Internal conflicts ===
Multiple civil wars were ongoing in Africa. The First Ivorian Civil War was halted in 2003 amid a ceasefire while France and the states of ECOWAS intervened. Peace talks fell apart on March 7 until the ceasefire was restored on May 3, only to be broken again on September 23. The war was left in a frozen state at the end of 2003 with rebels controlling parts of the country. The Second Liberian Civil War against Liberians United for Reconciliation and Democracy escalated when the Movement for Democracy in Liberia split off as its own faction. President Charles Taylor resigned on August 2, allowing a peace agreement to take place on August 18. The Second Sudanese Civil War escalated as new militant groups joined the conflict, though a security agreement was reached between the National Islamic Front and the Sudan People's Liberation Movement on September 25.

The Indonesian insurgency in Aceh escalated when a demilitarization agreement failed and the government renewed its offensive in May. Indonesia declared martial law and launched an attack against the Free Aceh Movement, killing at least 1,100 and capturing another 2,000 out of the movement's total 5,000 members. The Moro conflict in the Philippines deescalated when the Philippine government agreed to peace talks with the Moro Islamic Liberation Front in July, though conflicts with other groups continued. A truce between Nepal and Maoist rebels held until conflict resumed in August. Australia deployed 2,000 soldiers to the Solomon Islands in July as a response to internal unrest. The Sri Lankan civil war continued in 2003 as peace talks failed, and long-running civil wars in Burundi and in Uganda both escalated. Agreements were reached in the second Second Congo War for rebels and foreign soldiers to end hostilities.

The Colombian conflict against two Marxist militant groups—the Revolutionary Armed Forces of Colombia and the National Liberation Army—escalated in 2003. The government negotiated an agreement for the right-wing militant group United Self-Defense Forces of Colombia to disband as a means to deescalate the conflict. The Second Chechen War continued in Russia: the Russian government held a referendum for a new Chechen constitution and offered amnesty for Chechen rebels, but terror attacks continued.

=== International conflicts ===
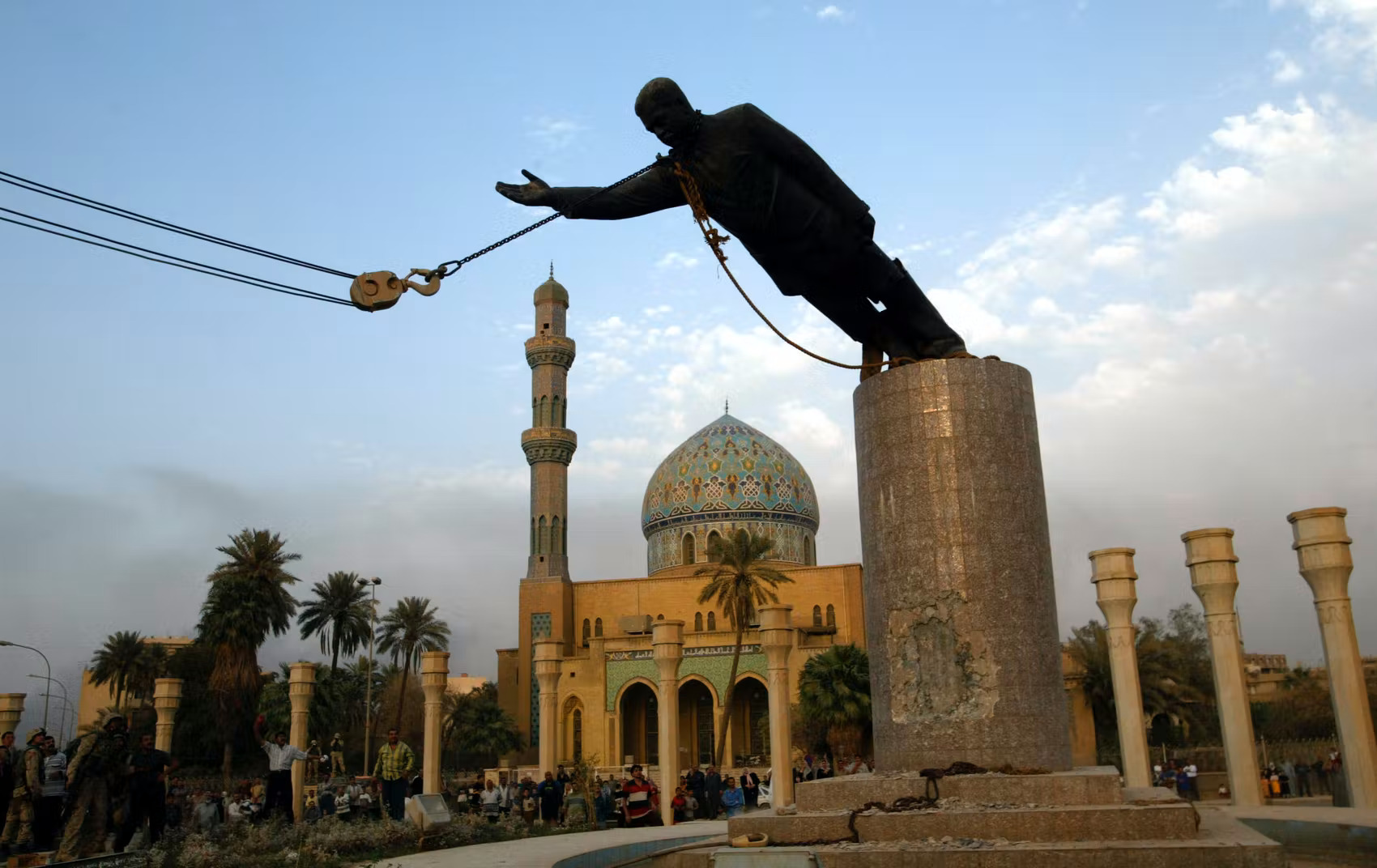
The government of Saddam Hussein was toppled following the invasion of Iraq.

A coalition of countries led by the United States, the United Kingdom, and Australia led an invasion of Iraq beginning on March 20, warning that Iraq had been operating a program to develop weapons of mass destruction. The subsequent Iraq War became the most publicized conflict in 2003. The coalition quickly defeated the Iraqi Armed Forces, and American president George W. Bush gave a speech on May 1 declaring victory in the war. The subsequent Iraqi insurgency proved more deadly than the invasion by the end of the year. The most significant insurgency action was a bombing on August 19 that targeted United Nations personnel in Baghdad, killing UN Special Representative Sérgio Vieira de Mello among many others. Doubts were raised throughout the year whether Iraq had been developing the weapons of which it was accused. The Kashmir conflict between India and Pakistan slowed until a bombing in Mumbai killed 52 people. A ceasefire took effect on November 23.

The Second Intifada continued into 2003 as conflict between Israel and Palestine killed 400 people in suicide bombings by Palestinians and military strikes by the Israel Defense Forces. Israel constructed the West Bank barrier, which it described as a measure to prevent suicide bombings and Palestine described as a measure to impose segregation. Israel also launched bombings against Lebanon and Syria following attacks in Israel. Al-Qaeda remained active in the Middle East, launching suicide bombings in Afghanistan, Saudi Arabia, and Turkey, as well as Morocco in North Africa. On September 10, its leaders Osama bin Laden and Ayman al-Zawahiri released their first video statement since 2001, celebrating the September 11 attacks. Al-Qaeda figures Khalid Sheikh Mohammed and Riduan Isamuddin were captured in March and August, respectively.

== Culture ==
=== Art and architecture ===
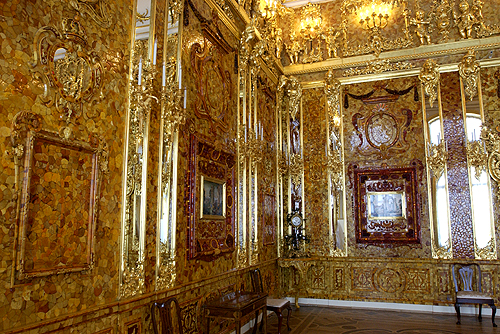
The Amber Room of Catherine Palace was reconstructed in 2003.

The most widely publicized art exhibition in 2003 was the 50th Venice Biennale, while the most heavily attended exhibitions were for Leonardo da Vinci and Thomas Struth, both held at the Metropolitan Museum of Art where they attracted thousands of visitors each day. The "Rembrandt's Journey" collected various Rembrandt works, including etchings and drawings, at the Museum of Fine Arts, Boston. The 7000 Years of Persian Art tour took place as a rare international collaboration from the National Museum of Iran. Street photography made a return in the art community, and the International Center of Photography held an exhibition on the subject. Elsewhere in the art world, Descent into Limbo by Andrea Mantegna was the most prominent Old Master artwork to be sold in 2003, going for US$28.6 million and the government of the Netherlands began returning items from its collection of works it acquired from Nazi Germany, the Nederlands Kunstbezit-collectie. Economic hardship and geopolitical events prompted a global shift toward affordable popular fashion, including a surge of face masks with fake brand logos that became popular in Hong Kong during the SARS epidemic.

Plans to replace the World Trade Center remained a focus of the architecture world in 2003, with architects David Childs and Daniel Libeskind placed in charge of the project. Other developments in architecture included an inquiry into the ongoing construction of the Scottish Parliament Building when its expected cost increased tenfold, and concern that Athens would not be ready to host the 2004 Summer Olympics when construction of the Olympic Stadium of Athens slowed. New buildings that opened in 2003 included the Silodam housing complex in Amsterdam, the Albertina art museum in Vienna after a previous closure, the Asian Civilisations Museum in Singapore, and the Walt Disney Concert Hall in Los Angeles after sixteen years of development. The Gherkin finished construction in London, and the Amber Room of Catherine Palace, which existed from 1717 to 1945, finished reconstruction.

Museums and libraries were looted and burned during riots in Baghdad following the invasion of Iraq. About 10,000 items were taken from the Iraq Museum, though many were returned by the end of the year, and several items were taken from the Mosul Museum. The Iraq National Library and Archive was burned down, destroying 500,000 books and 12 million Ottoman documents. The lost treasure of Tillya Tepe was found to be in Saddam Hussein's possession.

=== Media ===
The highest-grossing films globally in 2003 were The Lord of the Rings: The Return of the King, Finding Nemo, and The Matrix Reloaded, while the highest-grossing non-English film was Bayside Shakedown 2 (Japanese), the 39th highest-grossing film of the year. Critically acclaimed films included Finding Nemo, Lost in Translation, and Master and Commander.

Music sales in 2003 amounted to about 2.7 billion units, a decline of 6.5% from 2002. DVD music video thrived in 2003 at the expense of singles and cassettes. CD sales overall saw a large decline in favor of internet downloads. Globally, the best-selling albums of the year were Come Away with Me by Norah Jones, Get Rich or Die Tryin' by 50 Cent, and Meteora by Linkin Park. No non-English albums were among the global top fifty albums sold in 2003. The opera industry was negatively affected by a decline in tourism and other economic factors in Europe and North America, and many productions were canceled.

The popularity of the Harry Potter franchise meant that the publication of Harry Potter and the Order of the Phoenix was the largest literary event in 2003, bringing significant growth to the publishing and bookseller industries. The Daily Sun launched and became an immediate success in South Africa as a newspaper targeted toward black audiences as recovery from Apartheid continued. Former Peruvian president Alberto Fujimori began a radio show, The Chino's Hour, from exile in Japan. The television programs Queer Eye and Saudi Women Speak Out provided unprecedented media outlets for American gay men and Saudi women, respectively. Also successful in 2003 was the Taiwanese soap opera Liow sing hua yen. The GameCube, PlayStation 2, and Xbox remained the most popular video game consoles, although the GameCube faced poor sales. Nokia introduced the N-Gage, which functioned as both a phone and a handheld game console. Through the internet, flash mobs developed as a social trend in 2003.

When decentralized peer-to-peer file sharing replaced the centralized platform Napster as a means to pirate music, the Recording Industry Association of America began directing legal action against individual users who uploaded pirated songs rather than the platforms themselves, filing a total of 382 lawsuits. The iTunes Store launched on April 28 and was immediately successful, selling over 10 million songs over the next four months. This was touted as a possible solution to music piracy.

=== Sports ===
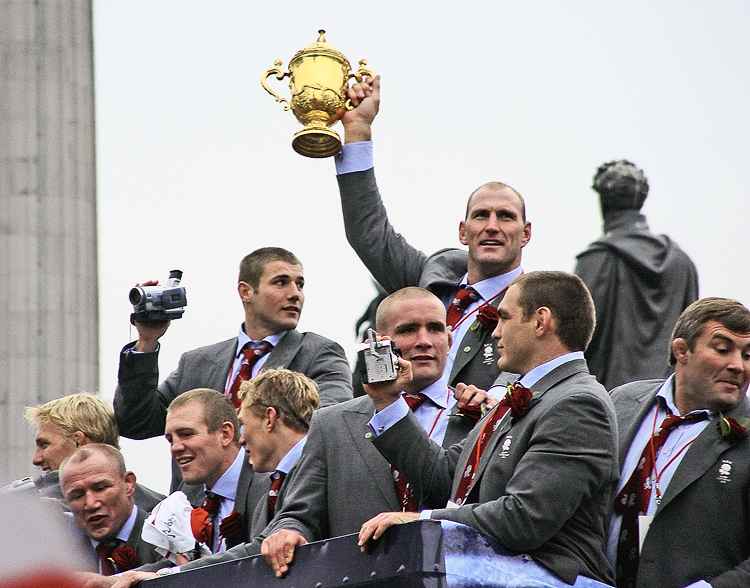
The England national rugby union team won the 2003 Rugby World Cup.

The England national rugby union team won the 2003 Rugby World Cup, making them the first Northern Hemisphere team to do so. Australia won the 2003 Cricket World Cup, coming out victorious in every match they played, while Kenya had upset victories that took them to the semi-finals. In tennis, players Roger Federer, Andy Roddick, and Juan Carlos Ferrero won their first Grand Slams in 2003, while Martina Navratilova tied with the record of twenty Wimbledon titles set by Billie Jean King. Lennox Lewis successfully defended his status as the heavyweight boxing champion against Vitali Klitschko.

In football, the transfer of footballer David Beckham from Manchester United F.C. to Real Madrid CF for £17.25 million was widely publicized. The UEFA Euro 2004 qualifying took place in 2003, where Turkey's defeat in a game against Latvia came as an upset after Turkey had been semi-finalists in the 2002 FIFA World Cup. The 2003 FIFA Women's World Cup was held in the United States after being moved from China due to a SARS outbreak; Germany won their first title after they defeated Sweden. Other major sporting upsets took place in golf when Ben Curtis defeated some of the sport's top players in his first major competition at the 2003 Open Championship, and in Major League Baseball when the Florida Marlins defeated the New York Yankees in the 2003 World Series.

The 2003 World Championships in Athletics saw Hicham El Guerrouj become the fourth man to win four successive world track titles and Carolina Klüft become the first woman in seven years to score more than 7,000 points in the heptathlon. Athletics was plagued with the discovery of THG steroids, which the United States accused the Bay Area Laboratory Co-operative of providing to athletes. Michael Schumacher remained the dominant driver in the 2003 Formula One World Championship, winning 11 of 17 races and claiming his sixth championship. Lance Armstrong won the 2003 Tour de France, giving him his fifth victory.

== Economy ==
The global economy was weak in the first half of 2003 as uncertainty arose from Middle Eastern conflict, the spread of SARS, and major corporate scandals of the previous year. It improved in the second half of 2003 with recovery from the early 2000s recession, remedied by low interest rates and expansionary fiscal policy. The gross world product increased in total by 2.5% in 2003, and international trade increased by 4.75%. The United States led the recovery, while China and Japan also made significant contributions. The economic situation improved in Latin America and Africa, while Western Europe saw slower recovery. The Eurozone had a low GDP growth of 0.5%. Questions arose around the Eurozone as the British economy fared better than those which had adopted the euro, and a referendum in Sweden showed strong opposition to the euro's adoption. Developing countries did especially well with a growth rate of 5%, compared to the 1.8% growth in developed countries. Argentina emerged from its economic crisis after four years, reaching the year's highest GDP in the Western Hemisphere with 7% growth.

The invasion of Iraq caused markets to fluctuate, first through a significant increase and then a decline as the war's financial cost became apparent and the 2003 Istanbul bombings shocked the economy. Petroleum prices fell after the invasion of Iraq concluded and rose again following an announcement that OPEC would reduce its output. The prices of non-fuel commodities, such as metal, minerals, and agricultural materials, increased during the year. Gold, copper, nickel, and aluminum all saw increases in value. The airline industry began a slow recovery from the serious decline it faced after the September 11 attacks. Foreign direct investment became a global economic priority when it began to falter, with 70 countries implementing at least one new law in attempts to improve the situation. In the corporate world, the Italian food company Parmalat and the Dutch supermarket company Ahold were the subjects of major corporate scandals. These were the latest among a series of corporate corruption scandals over the previous years that led the United States and a coalition of European countries to reform their policies on the matter.

Potential mergers and acquisitions in the media industry were a topic of discussion in 2003. Protestors in the United States objected to loosening of Federal Communications Commission regulations around television station ownership, causing the US Congress and the courts to overrule the changes. American company Liberty Media acquired UnitedGlobalCom and purchased shares in QVC to reach 98% ownership. HKATV CEO Chan Wing-kee purchased shares in HKATV in Hong Kong so that he had half ownership, while Hong Kong businessman Li Ka-shing purchased 64% of China Entertainment Television. A merger between TCL Electronics and Thomson created the world's largest television set manufacturer. The largest purchase of the newspaper industry in 2003 occurred when John Fairfax Holdings of Australia acquired Independent Newspapers of New Zealand, while a merger also took place between Denmark's two largest newspapers, Jyllands-Posten and Politiken.

== Environment and weather ==
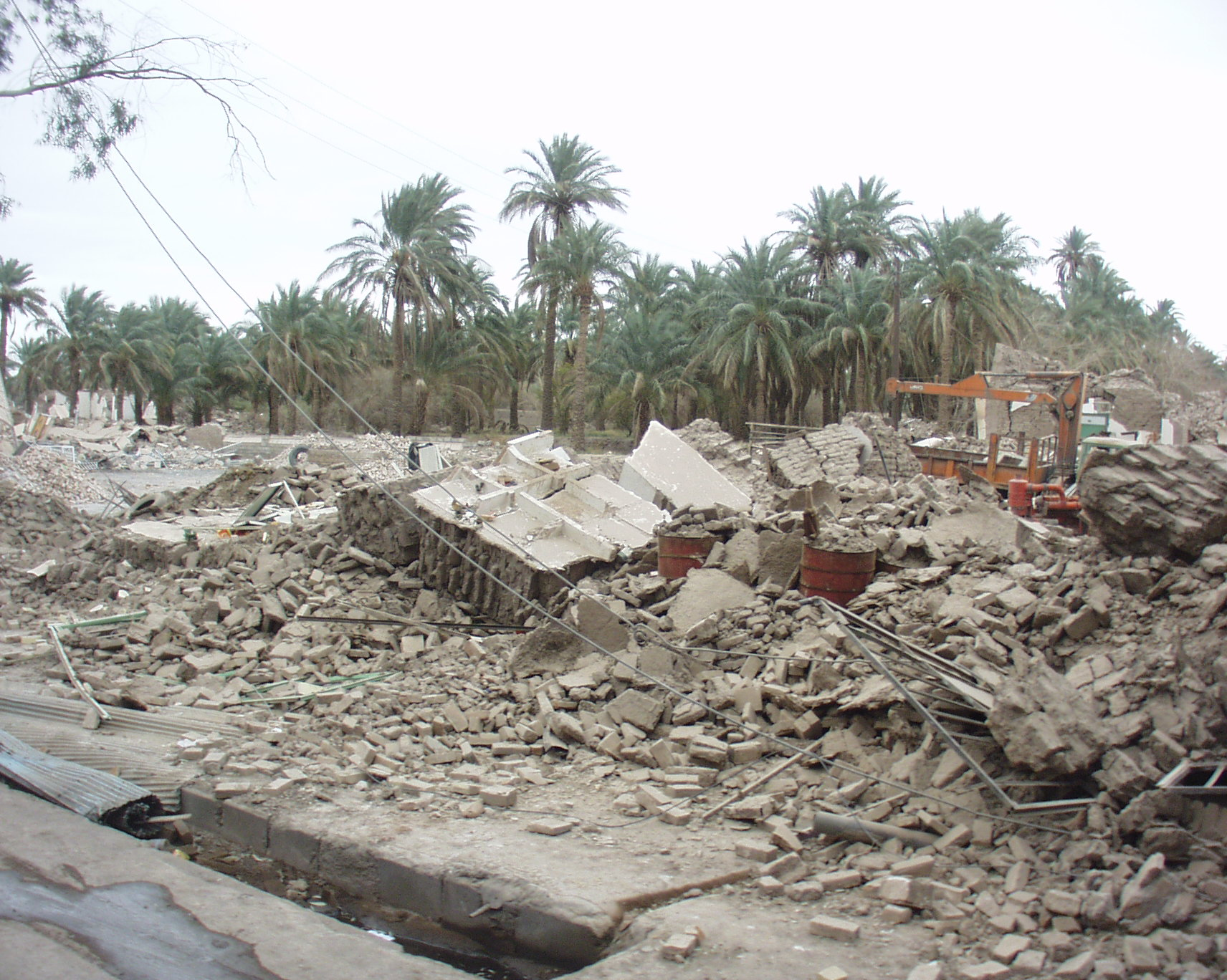
The city of Bam, Iran was destroyed in 2003 by an earthquake.

The year 2003 tied with 2002 as the second hottest year on record, behind only 1998. The year began during an El Niño period that continued until April. A major heatwave occurred in Europe during the summer, causing approximately 70,000 deaths, 14,000 of which were in France. Severe cold weather affected Asia, North America, and Peru. Low precipitation caused droughts in Australia, the United States, and Zimbabwe, but the previous year's droughts in Asia were alleviated by heavy precipitation in the region. Several reports were published in 2003 forecasting severe negative effects of global warming. The Intergovernmental Panel on Climate Change determined that approximately one million species risked extinction if no preventative measures were implemented, and the World Wide Fund for Nature determined that the fresh water access of 7 billion people would be at risk by 2050 because of global warming and other causes. Reports also warned about the potential destruction of the Amazon rainforest and provided evidence that widespread destruction of coral was taking place. Several studies in 2003 indicated that climate change was causing a global increase in droughts as well as changes to the ranges and life cycles of flora and fauna.

Major earthquakes in 2003 included a magnitude 6.8 earthquake in Algeria on May 21 that killed over 2,200 people and a magnitude 6.6 earthquake in Iran on December 26 that destroyed approximately 85% of Bam, Iran. The largest earthquake of the year was a magnitude 8.3 earthquake off the coast of Hokkaido, but it did not cause significant damage. Major volcano eruptions included Stromboli, Italy; Reventador, Ecuador; Soufrière Hills, Montserrat; Volcán de Fuego, Guatemala; and Anatahan, Mariana Islands.

The 2003 Atlantic hurricane season was above average in activity, including sixteen named storms of which seven were hurricanes. The most severe hurricanes were Hurricane Fabian, Hurricane Isabel, and Hurricane Kate. Tropical Storm Ana was the first recorded North Atlantic tropical storm to occur in April, and 2003 was the first year since 1887 to have two tropical storms occur in December. The 2003 Pacific typhoon season was slightly more intense than average, though the overall number of tropical storms was below average with 23 total storms. The most destructive typhoons were Typhoon Dujuan, which made landfall in Guangdong, China, on September 2, and Typhoon Maemi, which made landfall in South Korea on September 12.

International agreements about the environment that came into force included the Cartagena Protocol on Biosafety on September 11, the Aarhus Protocol on Persistent Organic Pollutants on October 23, and the Protocol on Heavy Metals on December 29. The capture or killing of whales and dolphins was a major topic in 2003, as was African poaching where the collection of bushmeat threatened chimpanzee and gorilla populations.

The Tasman Spirit oil spill occurred in Pakistan on July 28, and cleanup of the previous year's Prestige oil spill continued throughout 2003. Other environmental disasters included the bursting of a pulp factory's caustic soda reservoir on March 29 in Cataguases, Brazil and the explosion of a wellhead in Alaska. The sinking of Soviet submarine K-159 caused worries about leakage of its spent nuclear fuel, but none was found. A study in August caused alarm when it was determined that people across 17 countries were at risk of arsenic poisoning from groundwater.

Five new World Heritage Sites were recognized in 2003: Purnululu National Park in Australia, Three Parallel Rivers in China, Uvs Lake Basin in Mongolia and Russia, Monte San Giorgio in Switzerland, and Phong Nha – Kẻ Bàng National Park in Vietnam. Construction began on MOSE, a set of sea gates in Venice designed to prevent the city's perpetual flooding, and China began use of the Three Gorges Dam along the Yangtze. The overthrow of Saddam Hussein in Iraq ended his project to construct a dam that would have flooded the ruins of Assur.

== Health ==
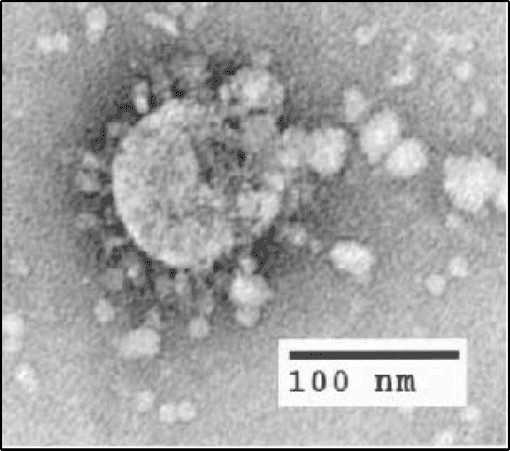
SARS-CoV-1 caused the SARS epidemic in 2003.

The World Health Organization adopted its first international agreement in 2003, the WHO Framework Convention on Tobacco Control. Member states also granted the WHO increased authority to take action in states without their approval to combat global health crises. Global food production increased from 2002 but fell short of the amount produced in 2001, and much of southern Africa was dependent on food aid early in the year following drought-related crop failures in 2002.

SARS, caused by the SARS-CoV-1 virus, became a major health concern in early 2003. China informed the WHO in February that an unknown infectious disease was spreading in the country, and the WHO issued its first global alert the following month. Fearing a pandemic, it issued a recommendation to avoid non-essential travel to Guangdong and Hong Kong where the largest outbreaks occurred. There were 8,098 cases, including 774 that ended in death, and the final case was diagnosed in June.

Multiple treatments for cancer were tested or approved in 2003 with varying results, including Avastin, Erbitux, Genasense, Velcade, and Letrozole. Several studies were published in 2003 warning of health effects for hormone replacement therapy in postmenopausal women, causing fear around the procedure. Analysis of retroviral gene therapy for severe combined immunodeficiency found that its life-threatening side effects were caused by the retrovirus affecting the LMO2 gene. Study of bone marrow cells cast doubt on cellular differentiation in stem-cell therapy, moving focus toward cell fusion.

A large spike in polio cases led the WHO to redirect its global polio immunization program to the thirteen most-affected countries. A breakout in West Africa led to a massive vaccination drive where hundreds of thousands of participants helped vaccinate the children of Benin, Burkina Faso, Ghana, Niger, and Togo over three days in October. Following a summit on measles the same month, UNICEF and the WHO organized a measles vaccination drive in Uganda that brought the nation's child measles vaccination rate to 100% in two weeks. The RTS,S malaria vaccine began trials for children in Mozambique after it was shown to be safe for adults in several nations, while human trials for an Ebola vaccine began in the United States.

Record numbers of HIV/AIDS cases and deaths occurred in 2003 with an estimated five million new cases and three million deaths. Although the disease grew, UNAIDS and the WHO reformed how they estimated the total cases and reduced the estimate from 42 million to 40 million. The AIDSVAX vaccine by VaxGen underwent two trials but was unsuccessful. The first fusion inhibitor treatment for AIDS, enfuvirtide, was approved in the United States in March. Evidence was presented at an International AIDS Society meeting in July that about 10% of HIV infections in Europe had acquired resistance to antiretroviral treatments. In response to concerns about the feasibility of treating HIV in Africa, several pharmaceutical companies reduced prices of antiretroviral drugs by up to 50% for countries in Africa and the Caribbean.

Other major disease outbreaks include an outbreak of mpox (then known as monkeypox) in May and June in the United States—the first mpox outbreak in the Western Hemisphere—with 72 reported cases, the spread of avian influenza to poultry in Europe with one human case in Hong Kong that proved fatal, and two instances of bovine spongiform encephalopathy in cows in Canada and the United States.

== Politics and law ==
=== International politics ===
The Treaty of Accession authorized ten countries (yellow) to join the European Union (blue).

A conference held by the World Trade Organization in September resulted in a dispute between nations that cast doubts on whether the agreements of the Doha Development Round were sustainable. Developing nations alleged that their input was being excluded by Western powers. The use of farming subsidies, particularly by Europe, Japan, and the United States, was challenged here because of their effect on developing nations. These disputes led developing nations to form their own alliance, the G21 (later the G20 developing nations). Several free trade areas were proposed or negotiated in 2003, including separate zones for the Andean Community, ASEAN, Central America, the Commonwealth of Independent States, the Southern Cone Common Market, the South Asian Association for Regional Cooperation, and the Western Hemisphere's Free Trade Area of the Americas. Some of these were conditional on political reform and democratization. Cambodia and Nepal became the first developing countries to be approved for World Trade Organization membership through a working-party negotiation.

Renewed concern about nuclear weapons began when North Korea announced its withdrawal from the Treaty on the Non-Proliferation of Nuclear Weapons in January, and on February 6 it announced the restoration of its nuclear weapons program. Several nations engaged in tenuous negotiations with North Korea throughout the year, but no agreements were made. Iran announced its own program to produce enriched uranium in violation of its agreement with the International Atomic Energy Agency, disclosing this as an attempt to avoid sanctions. Libya agreed to end any plans for a nuclear weapons program as scrutiny of such programs around the world increased. The Strategic Offensive Reductions Treaty between Russia and the United States came into effect in June.

Ten European countries signed accession agreements in April that would make them members of the European Union in May 2004. This included the first eight post-Soviet states to be approved for membership. The European Commission objected to some of the admissions, arguing that the countries had weak legal institutions and were plagued with corruption. The first draft of a potential Constitution of the European Union was written by former French president Valéry Giscard d'Estaing and presented to the EU in June.

Political discourse around migration expanded in 2003 from a focus on irregular migration and right of asylum to a more general focus on how inflows of migrants affected trade and the workforce. Many countries expressed interest in regional agreements to manage migration and several summits were held in different parts of the world. Other developments in international politics included the seizure of the North Korean Pong Su by Australia in April after the ship smuggled heroin into the country, the construction of a Russian military base in Kant, Kyrgyzstan, as the Russian Federation's first foreign military base, and Libya's acceptance of fault in the 1988 downing of Pan Am Flight 103. In the latter case, Libyan leader Muammar Gaddafi offered reparations to the victims' family members, prompting the United States to petition for the removal of international sanctions against Libya

=== Domestic politics ===
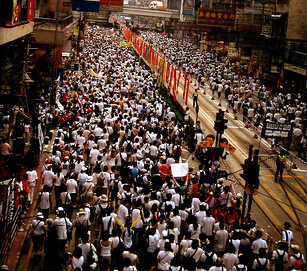
A series of protests for civil rights erupted in Hong Kong.

Liberian president Charles Taylor fled the country on August 1 and was replaced by Gyude Bryant, a compromise between the different factions of the Liberian Civil War, on October 14. Nigeria declined to extradite Taylor to Sierra Leone where he was under indictment. President Fradique de Menezes of São Tomé and Príncipe and President Kumba Ialá of Guinea-Bissau were overthrown by military coups in July and in September, respectively, but de Menezes resumed control following negotiations.

Political controversies in 2003 included a series of protests in Hong Kong following the implementation of laws by China that limited the rights of the Hongkongers, the arrest of Russian businessman Mikhail Khodorkovsky on October 27 in what was seen internationally as political persecution by the government to exercise control over Russian oligarchs, and the arrest of opposition leader Aung San Suu Kyi and other pro-democracy activists in Myanmar on May 30. Serbian prime minister Zoran Đinđić was assassinated on March 12, prompting a crackdown on a criminal organization that supported former dictator Slobodan Milošević, whom Đinđić had ousted. Swedish foreign minister Anna Lindh was murdered on September 10.

Argentina revoked amnesty for those who had people killed during the Dirty War, and a trial began for General Antonio Domingo Bussi. The country also attempted to extradite 40 people accused of crimes against Spanish nationals during the war, but Spain did not accept them. The secular Shinui party gained influence in Israel following a public debate on the role of Judaism in Israeli politics. Armenia abolished its death penalty so it would be in compliance with Council of Europe obligations.

=== Crime and international law ===
The American-led invasion of Iraq dominated discourse around international law and sparked debate about when such actions are justified. Military intervention was supported by countries such as Australia, Spain, the United Kingdom, the United States, and much of Eastern Europe, while its strongest opponents included China, France, Germany, and Russia. Proponents justified the actions by invoking a right to self defense through preemptive war, the allowance of use of force in Chapter VII of the United Nations Charter, and the past United Nations Security Council Resolutions 687 (1991) and 1441 (2002). The United Nations played a critical role in international discourse around the invasion as its relations with the United States were strained. International relations were similar troubled in Europe where British support for the war brought the UK into diplomatic conflict with much of Western Europe. The US was criticized for holding suspected terrorists without due process and subjecting them to torture. The Iraqi president Saddam Hussein went into hiding as the invasion took place, but he was discovered and arrested six months later. The Iraqi government was replaced by the Coalition Provisional Authority, led by the United States military.

The International Court of Justice (ICJ) accepted two new cases in 2003: a border dispute case between Malaysia and Singapore and a dispute over the United States' application of the death penalty against Mexican nationals. The United Nations General Assembly requested an advisory opinion from the ICJ regarding the construction of the West Bank barrier by Israel. A case filed by Libya against the United Kingdom and the United States regarding the 1988 downing of Pan Am Flight 103 was settled outside of court. The ICJ ruled in the Oil Platforms case that American force was not justified in the 1987 attacks on Iranian oil platforms but that it had not broken the 1955 treaty as Iran alleged. It rejected appeals of a 1992 border dispute between El Salvador and Honduras and a 1996 decision that the ICJ had jurisdiction in Yugoslavia at the time.

The International Criminal Tribunal for the former Yugoslavia convicted major political leaders, including President of Republika Srpska Biljana Plavšić and military commander Stanislav Galić. The Tribunal for Rwanda convicted clerics and issued the first international convictions for journalists since the Nuremberg trials. Terms for the creation of a Khmer Rouge Tribunal in Cambodia were agreed on in June. The International Criminal Court (ICC) was inaugurated in March with Argentine lawyer Luis Moreno Ocampo as its first chief prosecutor. The United States pressured dozens of nations to sign bilateral immunity agreements affirming that they would not extradite American nationals to the ICC. Belgium repealed its war crimes law that it had used to claim universal jurisdiction over all war crimes committed anywhere in the world.

The Migrant Workers Convention came into effect on July 1. The United Nations Convention Against Transnational Organized Crime, the first UN measure on the issue, came into force on September 29. The United Nations Convention Against Corruption opened for signing on December 9.

== Religion ==
A week of celebrations were held in Vatican City for the 25th anniversary of the election of Pope John Paul II. The events included the beatification of Mother Teresa. John Paul II became the first pope to enter a mosque when he visited the Umayyad Mosque in Damascus on May 6. The church's sexual abuse scandals continued into 2003. Cambodia banned Christian proselytizing in February, and Saudi Arabia banned the construction of Christian churches in March.

Several Christian denominations debated homosexuality and same-sex marriages in 2003. The Catholic Dicastery for the Causes of Saints, the Southern Baptist Convention, and the Coptic Orthodox Church all took stances against it, while the United Church of Christ endorsed the inclusion of transgender people. The Anglican Communion was embroiled in debate about its stance on homosexuality when Rowan Williams was made Archbishop of Canterbury on February 27 and expressed concern that the issue was fragmenting the church. Jeffrey John was nominated as Bishop of Reading in May, but his relationship with a man caused controversy and prompted him to decline. A similar debate took place when the gay reverend Gene Robinson was made Bishop of New Hampshire on November 2.

Opponents of the American-led invasion of Iraq saw it as an attack on Islam. Organized efforts were made by political and religious leaders in the Muslim world to differentiate typical Islam from extremism. Religious strife occurred in Saudi Arabia where Wahhabi Muslims supported stricter application of Islamic law—some engaging in civil unrest and suicide bombings—while other denominations spoke in favor of tolerance for minority religions and women. Terrorist attacks took place throughout the Middle East, including a car bombing at the Imam Ali Shrine that killed Mohammad Baqir al-Hakim, the most prominent pro-US cleric in Iraq, and at least 80 other people. French society and the French government, especially within the National Front, took a hostile approach toward Muslims in 2003. A proposal was made to ban religious attire in schools, while at the same time the country's first Muslim-run school was opened in Lille.

Judaism was marked with disputes between different sects, both in Israel and the United Kingdom. Israel debated whether Haredi Jews should be allowed to retain exemptions to certain laws. The British Masorti Rabbi Louis Jacobs was not permitted in an Orthodox ceremony for his granddaughter's marriage on the orders of the beth din in London, reigniting the Jacobs Affair of the 1960s.

Hindus were allowed to enter an 11th-century memorial in Bhojshala, Madhya Pradesh, after a five-year ban against Hindus culminated in violence. Controversy erupted in the Hindu world after the reprint of Ganesa: Lord of Obstacles, Lord of Beginnings by Paul Courtright and the publication of Shivaji: Hindu King in Islamic India by James Laine. Both of these books were seen as offensive by some Hindu groups, causing the writers and publishers to receive threats and harassment. The Gurdwara Sri Guru Singh Sabha Southall opened in London as the largest Sikh temple outside of India. In Haiti, practitioners of voodoo were given the right to register with the Ministry of Foreign Affairs and Religion.

== Science ==
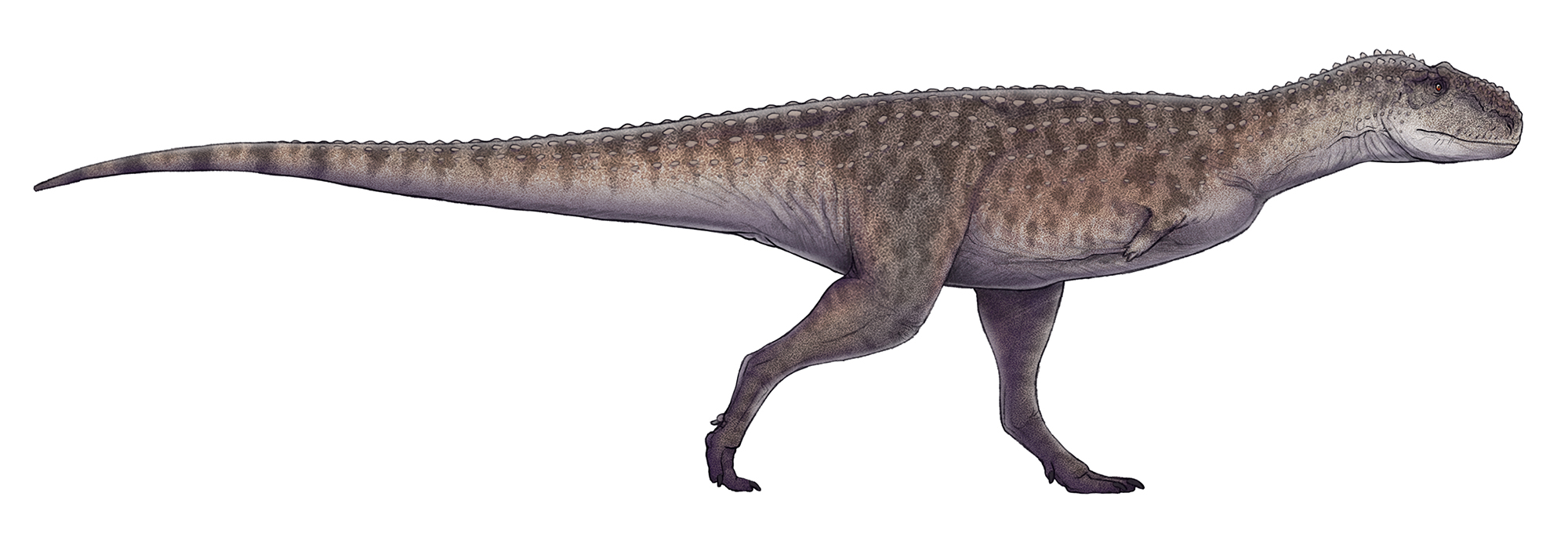
The dinosaur Rajasaurus was described in 2003.

The Herto Man was dated to approximately 160,000 years ago and proposed as a human subspecies Homo sapiens idaltu. The findings provided additional evidence for the theory that humans originated in Africa. Another set of human fossils, a set of skulls first discovered in Mexico in 1959, were dated to approximately 13,000 years ago. Among nonhuman fossils, the dinosaur Rajasaurus narmadensis was described, study of Microraptor gui fossils determined that it had asymmetrical feathers on its limbs that supported a theory of arboreal evolution for dinosaurs, Ginkgo biloba fossils from 121 million years ago closed a gap in the species' fossil record, Tetrapod fossils from the Late Devonian were discovered in China that indicated fast globalization of the clade, and fossilized spider silk was dated to at least 130 million years.

The 110th element of the periodic table was officially named darmstadtium (Ds), replacing the provisional name ununnilium. The Human Genome Project announced in April that it had finished mapping the human genome. Studies in genetics produced artificial mouse eggs from stem cells, found that chimpanzees share 99.4 percent of their DNA with humans instead of the previous estimate of 95 percent, and determined that microRNAs are responsible for controlling shape-regulating genes in plants. Human cloning was a subject of international scrutiny in 2003, triggered in part by the disputed claims of the Raëlist company Clonaid that they had produced human clones. Several countries supported international bans on human cloning. The cloned horse Prometea was the first mammal in which its mother was also its genetic donor, while the cloned sheep Dolly died on February 21 after living for only six years, raising doubts about the viability of cloning. The use of genetically modified crops was also a controversial issue, particularly in the European Union where a moratorium on genetically modified food remained in effect. Many other countries expanded their production of genetically modified crops.

The 2002 discovery of the James Ossuary, the suspected resting place of James, brother of Jesus, was challenged by the Israel Antiquities Authority when it accused Oded Golan of fabricating the discovery. A Liao dynasty coffin was opened during a live televised broadcast in Mongolia, revealing the remains of a nobleman. Other discoveries announced in 2003 include a religious burial site from c. 9000 BC in Kfar HaHoresh, a sanctuary to Zeus in the Greek city Dion, the first Pleistocene cave art to be found in Great Britain at Creswell Crags, Bronze Age weapons and jewelry in Tyrol, Viking treasure from c. 1020 on the Isle of Man, six 4th-century Roman shoes near Amsterdam, a Spring and Autumn period tomb in Henan, a wall of Mandan defensive fortifications at Double Ditch in North Dakota, a Mississippian building in Illinois, Olmec seals that are among the oldest New World writing, burial sites in Teotihuacan, a 4000-year-old gourd fragment with religious decorations, and the 1898 wreckage of the Portland off the coast of Massachusetts.

=== Space exploration and astronomy ===
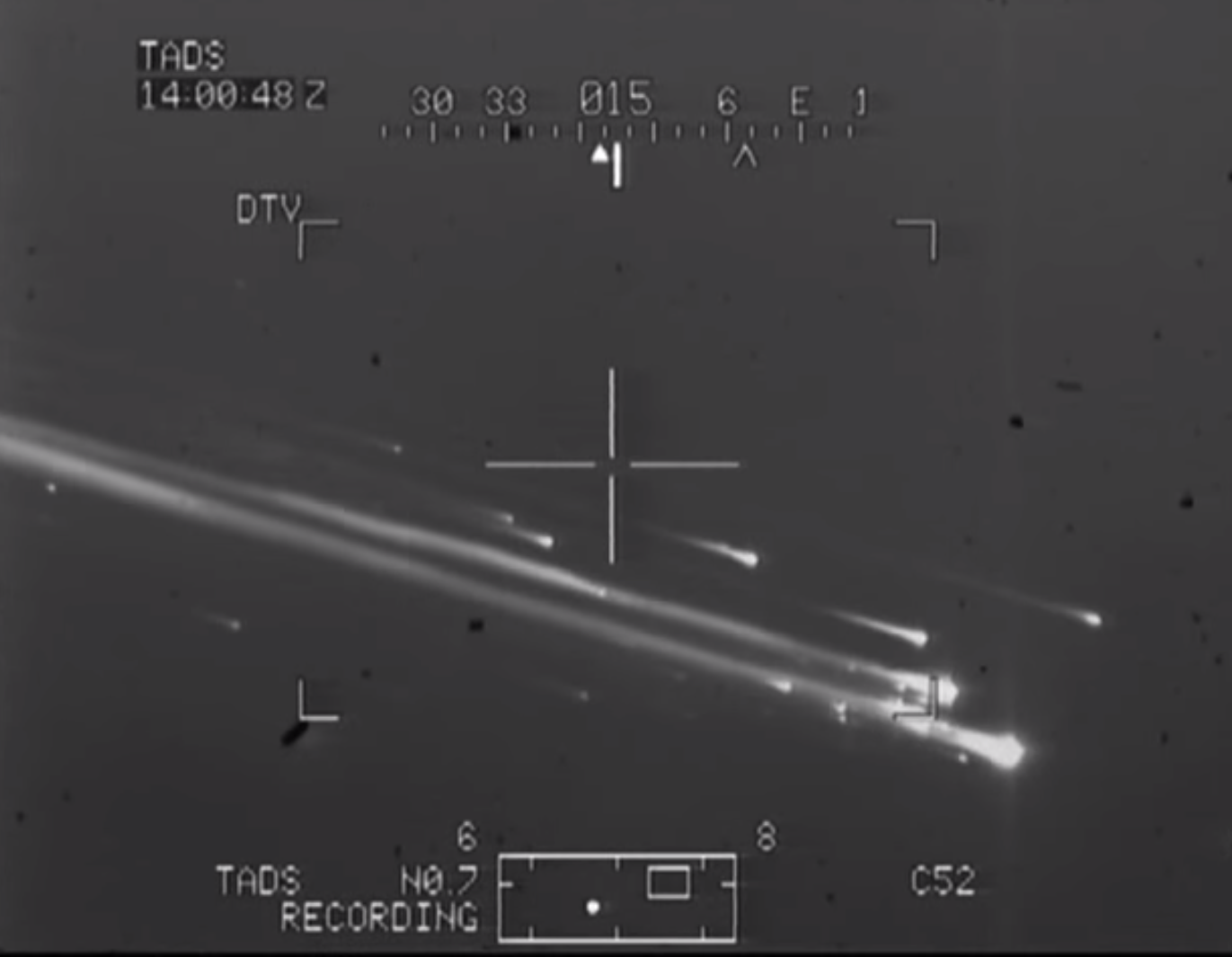
The Space Shuttle Columbia was destroyed on reentry.

The American Space Shuttle Columbia was destroyed in the atmosphere as it returned to Earth on February 1, killing all seven on board. The Brazilian VLS-1 launcher exploded on the launchpad on August 22, killing 21 people. NASA lost contact with the Pioneer 10 probe (launched in 1972) and ended the mission of the Galileo probe (launched in 1989) by sending it into Jupiter's atmosphere. The Voyager 1 probe became the first man-made object to reach the termination shock zone at the edge of the Solar System. China became the third country to launch a human into space with the Shenzhou 5 mission on October 15, in which taikonaut Yang Liwei was in space for 21 hours.

NASA and the European Space Agency (ESA) scheduled several launches toward Mars for 2003 as the planet's orbit brought it its closest to Earth in approximately 60,000 years. NASA launched two Mars rovers, the Spirit on June 10 and the Opportunity on July 7. The ESA launched the Mars Express orbiter with the Beagle 2 lander on June 2, but contact was lost with the Beagle 2 when it was scheduled to land on December 25. The Mars Global Surveyor found over 500 new geographical features on Mars, including ones that provided evidence for landslides around former volcanoes, erosion that may have been caused by flowing water, and liquid iron in the planet's core.

The ESA's Rosetta mission to the comet 46P/Wirtanen was scheduled for January 12 but set back a year for a safety evaluation of the Ariane 5 rocket following an incident the previous month. NASA launched the Space Infrared Telescope Facility (later renamed the Spitzer Space Telescope) on August 2, and the ESA launched the SMART-1 satellite on September 27 to study the Moon. The first results from the Wilkinson Microwave Anisotropy Probe were published in 2003. Its measurements of cosmic background radiation indicated that the universe is 13.7 billion years old and the first stars formed 200 million years after the Big Bang. This provided evidence of the existence of dark matter and dark energy.

The number of known moons in the solar system increased from 40 to 61 for Jupiter, from 30 to 31 for Saturn, and from 8 to 11 for Neptune. Other astronomical developments occurred when OGLE-TR-56b became the first exoplanet to be discovered through transit photometry, the exoplanet PSR B1620−26 b was estimated to be over 12.5 billion years old, and the existence of the Canis Major dwarf galaxy was proposed. The star Achernar was determined to be oblate in shape with the radius of its equator being approximately 50% larger than that of its poles.

=== Technology ===
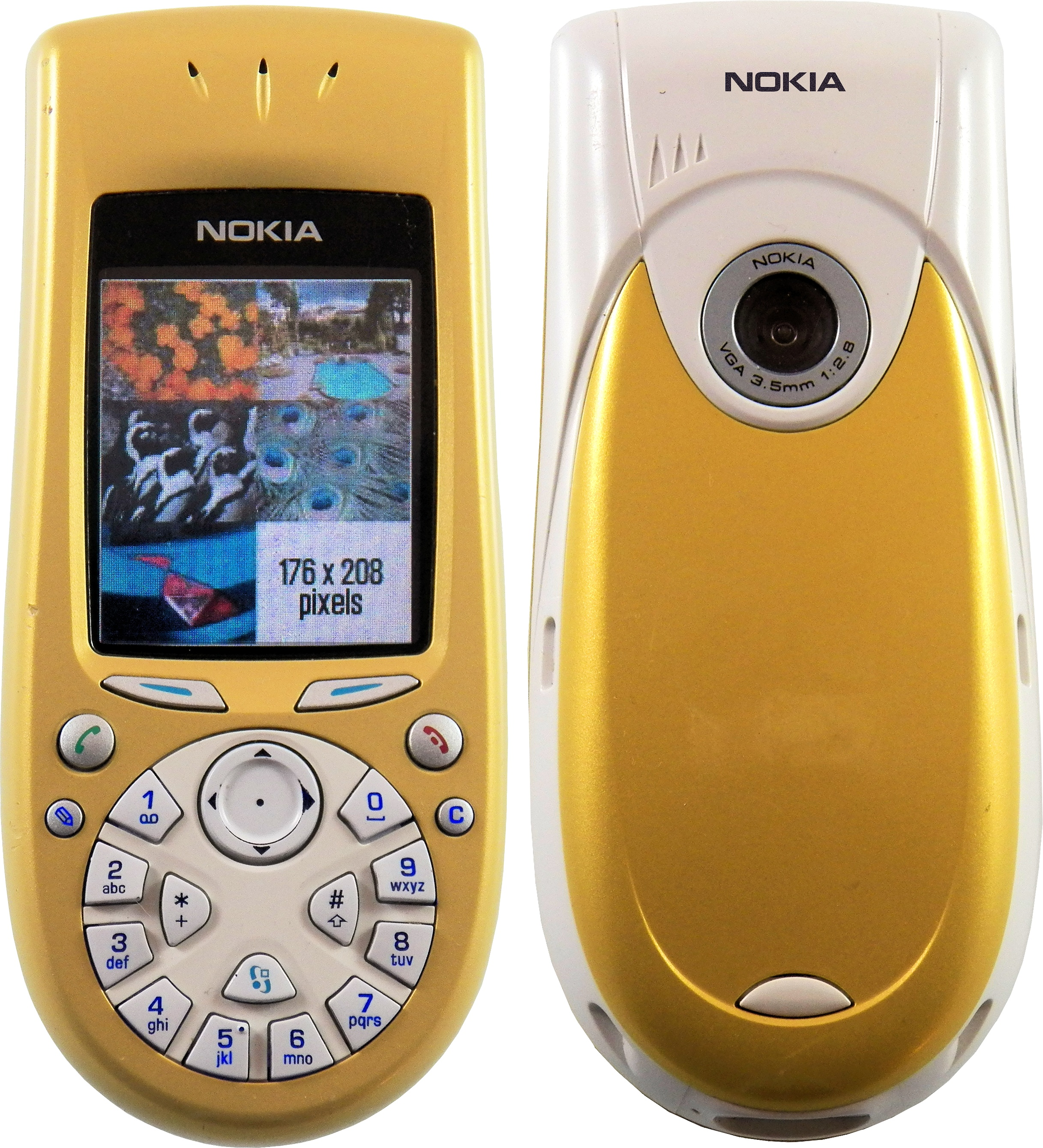
Camera phones became mainstream in 2003 (pictured: Nokia 3650).

Computing was the subject of multiple legal and philosophical disputes in 2003. The European Commission considered legalizing software patents, triggering strong backlash. A dispute began between SCO Group and IBM over the open source status of UNIX, triggering a lawsuit in March. The State Council of China required that government ministries move away from software developed by Microsoft in favor of locally produced software. Approximately 55 percent of emails sent in 2003 were spam emails, which led to the implementation of the Privacy and Electronic Communications Directive in the European Union and the CAN-SPAM Act in the United States. The United Nations World Summit on the Information Society took place in December to organize the expansion of internet access throughout the world. Significant malware programs in 2003 included the SQL Slammer, the Blaster worm, the Welchia worm that was meant to combat the Blaster worm, and the Sobig worm, which was transmitted through email and became the world's fastest spreading virus.

Among consumer products, camera phones became widespread in 2003 as millions were sold. Several companies invested in flatscreen and LCD television production in 2003. The original Volkswagen Beetle, the most widely produced car ever designed, ended production with a final run of 3,000 cars for collectors. Intel and AMD released 64-bit processors in 2003, popularizing what was previously a niche hardware amid the more common 32-bit systems. Broadband internet and cable modems gained popularity at the expense of dial-up and DSL modems. Wi-Fi hotspots became more common, and they were increasingly found in businesses for customers' use. Other technological milestones included the end of Concorde supersonic airliner services on October 24 after operating for 27 years, the installation of the first rotating underwater turbine in June to generate tidal power in the United Kingdom, and the testing of the Massive Ordinance Air Burst bomb by the United States Air Force as its strongest non-nuclear munition.

== Events ==
=== January ===
- January 5 – Tel Aviv central bus station: Two Palestinian suicide bombers attack a neighborhood in Tel Aviv, killing at least 23 people and injuring 103.
- January 6 – The discovery of OGLE-TR-56b, the first exoplanet to be discovered through transit photometry, is announced.
- January 10 – North Korea announces its withdrawal from the Treaty on the Non-Proliferation of Nuclear Weapons.
- January 22 – The last signal from NASA's Pioneer 10 spacecraft is received, some 12.2 billion kilometers (7.6 billion mi) from Earth.
- January 23
  - NASA loses contact with the Pioneer 10 probe after nearly 31 years.
  - The 1492 painting Descent into Limbo by Andrea Mantegna sells for $28.6 million.
- January 31 – Waterfall rail accident: An Intercity Tangara G set train derails near Waterfall, killing 7 and injuring 40 others. The cause was of a faulty deadman's brake.

=== February ===
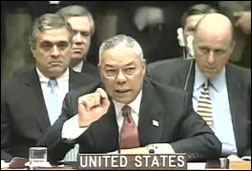
Colin Powell holds a model of an anthrax vial in his speech to the United Nations on February 5

- February 1 – At the conclusion of the STS-107 mission, the Space Shuttle Columbia disintegrates during reentry over Texas, killing all seven astronauts on board.
- February 4 – The Federal Republic of Yugoslavia is renamed to "Serbia and Montenegro" (after its two constituent states) after its leaders reconstitute the country into a loose state-union between Montenegro and Serbia, marking an end to the 73-year-long use of the name "Yugoslavia" by a sovereign state.
- February 5 – U.S. Secretary of State Colin Powell gives a speech to the United Nations presenting the case for a military invasion of Iraq. It will later be discovered that the United States Bush administration misled him when preparing his testimony.
- February 6 – North Korea announces that it has resumed its nuclear weapons program.
- February 9 – The 2003 Cricket World Cup begins. It is held in South Africa, Zimbabwe, and Kenya, and it ends on March 23 with Australia defeating India in the final.
- February 11 – The first set of data from the Wilkinson Microwave Anisotropy Probe is published.
- February 14 – Dolly the sheep, the clone of a mammal, dies.
- February 15 – Millions of people worldwide take part in massive anti-war protests in anticipation of the United States and its allies invading Iraq to overthrow Saddam Hussein's regime.
- February 20 – The Station nightclub fire: A fire broke out at a music venue in West Warwick, Rhode Island, United States, killing 100 people and injuring 230.
- February 24 – 2003 Bachu earthquake: A 6.8 M_{w}earthquake strikes in Xinjiang, killing 257 people.
- February 26 – The War in Darfur begins after rebel groups rise up against the Sudanese government.
- February 27
  - Rowan Williams becomes Archbishop of Canterbury.
  - Former Bosnian Serb leader Biljana Plavšić is sentenced by the United Nations International Criminal Tribunal for the former Yugoslavia to 11 years in prison for war crimes committed during the Bosnian War.

=== March ===
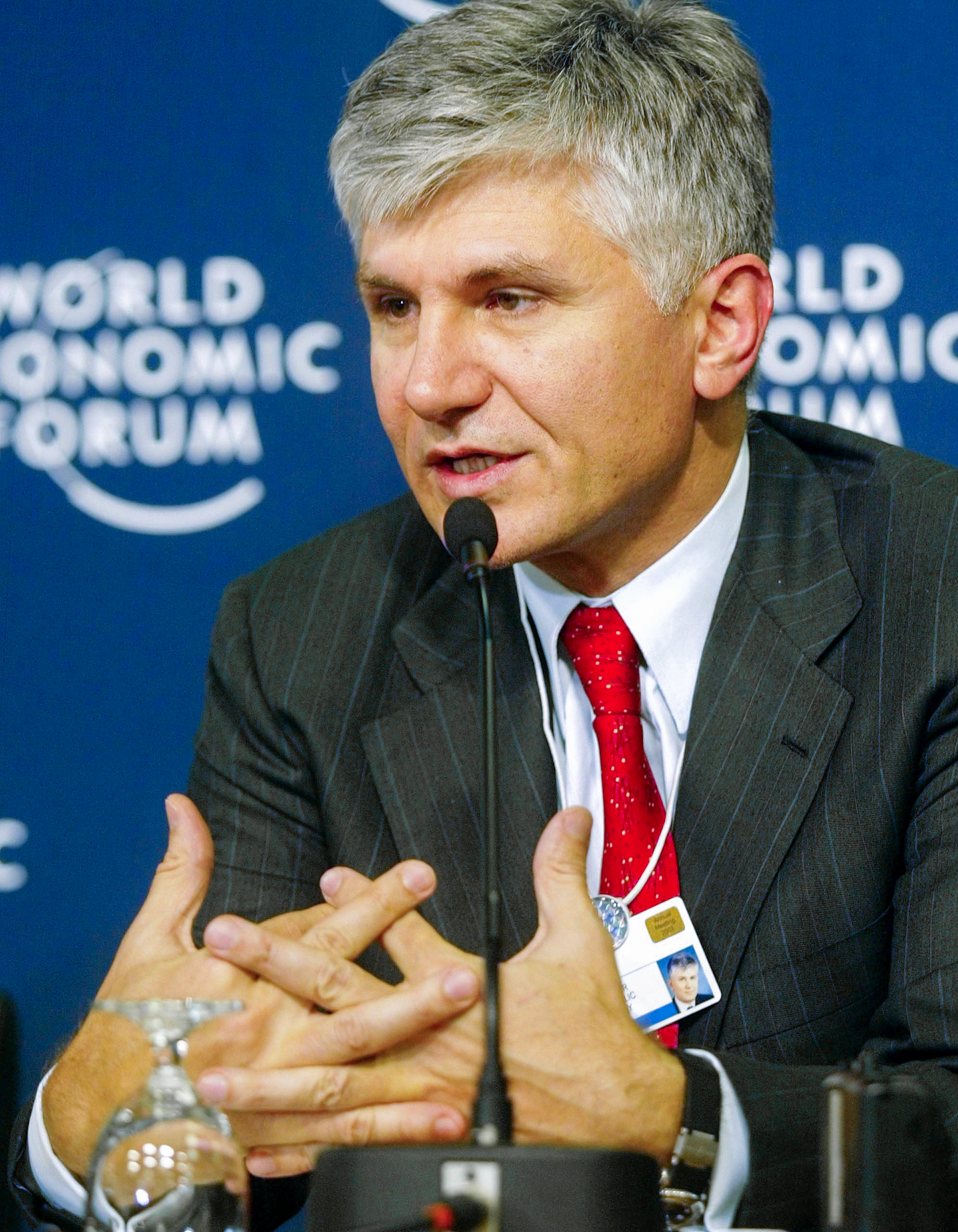
Serbian Prime Minister Zoran Đinđić was assassinated on March 12.

- March 1 – Khalid Sheikh Mohammed of al-Qaeda is captured in Rawalpindi, Pakistan.
- March 6 – SCO Group files a lawsuit against IBM as part of an ongoing dispute regarding the use of Unix in the development of Linux.
- March 7 – Peace talks break down in the First Ivorian Civil War.
- March 8 – Malta approves joining the European Union in a referendum.
- March 11
  - The International Criminal Court begins operations.
  - The first test of the GBU-43/B MOAB bomb takes place.
- March 12
  - Prime Minister Zoran Đinđić of Serbia is assassinated in Belgrade by a sniper.
  - The World Health Organization issues a global alert on SARS when it spreads to Hong Kong and Vietnam after originating in Mainland China.
- March 15 – Former General François Bozizé seizes power through a military coup in the Central African Republic.
- March 17 – U.S. President George W. Bush presents a 48-hour ultimatum for Iraqi president Saddam Hussein to resign.
- March 20 – The Iraq War begins with the invasion of Iraq by the United States and allied forces.
- March 23
  - 2003 Nadimarg massacre: Islamist militants gather and execute citizens of a Hindu village in Kashmir, killing 24 of the 54 residents.
  - Slovenia approves joining the European Union and NATO in a referendum.
- March 31 – In its first military operation, the European Union takes over peacekeeping operations in Macedonia from NATO's Operation Allied Harmony.

=== April ===
- April 2 – Hundreds of protesters seize an oil station in Guatemala in response to being underpaid for their contributions in fighting a civil war that lasted from 1960 until 1996.
- April 7 – The Archaeological Survey of India orders that Hindus be allowed to worship in the Kamal Maula Mosque.
- April 9 – U.S. forces seize control of Baghdad, ending the rule of Saddam Hussein.
- April 12 – Hungary approves joining the European Union in a referendum.
- April 13
  - Five college students are murdered in an unsolved arson in Columbus, Ohio.
  - 21 teenage teenage children are killed after a car accident in Tempi, Greece, after a school trip.
- April 14 – The Human Genome Project is completed, with 99% of the human genome sequenced to 99.99% accuracy.
- April 16 – The Treaty of Accession is signed in Athens between the European Union and ten countries (Czech Republic, Estonia, Cyprus, Latvia, Lithuania, Hungary, Malta, Poland, Slovenia and Slovakia), concerning these countries' accession into the EU, leading to the 2004 enlargement of the European Union.
- April 18 – Indian Prime Minister Atal Bihari Vajpayee visits Kashmir and expresses support for peace negotiations with Pakistan.
- April 20
  - Tropical Storm Ana becomes the first recorded North Atlantic tropical storm to occur in April.
  - The North Korean ship Pong Su is seized by the Royal Australian Navy for smuggling heroin into the country.
- April 21 – The Liberation Tigers of Tamil Eelam break away from peace talks in the Sri Lankan Civil War.
- April 28 – The iTunes Store launches.

=== May ===
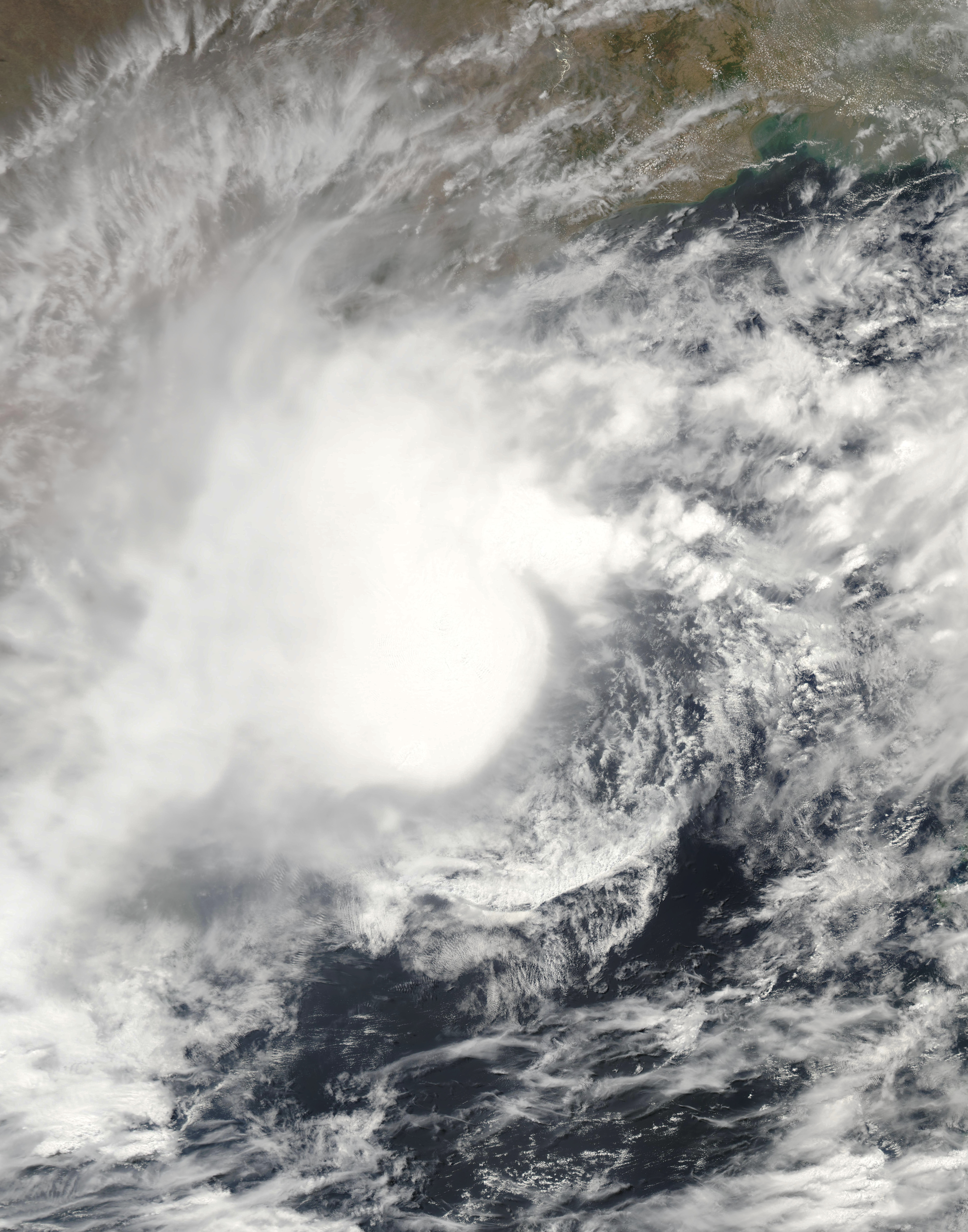
A tropical cyclone caused severe damage in Sri Lanka in May 2003.

- May 1
  - 2003 Bingöl earthquake: A 6.4 M_{w} earthquake strikes in Bingöl, Turkey, killing 177 people.
  - U.S. President George W. Bush declares an end to the invasion of Iraq in the Mission Accomplished speech. Hostilities would continue for several years during a period of Iraqi insurgency.
- May 3 – A ceasefire takes effect in the First Ivorian Civil War.
- May 6 – John Paul II visits Umayyad Mosque in Damascus, becoming the first pope ever to enter a mosque.
- May 11
  - Lithuania approves joining the European Union in a referendum.
  - 2003 Sri Lanka cyclone: A cyclone makes landfall in Sri Lanka, killing 260 people and causing the country's worst natural disaster in 50 years.
- May 12 – 2003 Znamenskoye suicide bombing: Chechen suicide bombers attack a government office in Znamenskoye, Russia, killing at least 59 people.
- May 15 – Contact with infected prairie dogs causes the first outbreak of human mpox in the Western Hemisphere. Cases continue until June 11.
- May 17 – Slovakia approves joining the European Union in a referendum.
- May 19 – Peace talks break down in the insurgency in Aceh and the Indonesian government launches new attacks against the insurgents.
- May 21
  - 2003 Boumerdès earthquake: a 6.8 M_{w} earthquake strikes in Algeria, killing over 2,200 people.
  - The World Health Organization adopts its first treaty, the WHO Framework Convention on Tobacco Control.
- May 24 – The Eurovision Song Contest 2003 takes place in Riga, Latvia, and is won by Turkish entrant Sertab Erener with the song "Everyway That I Can".
- May 25 — A Boeing 727 aircraft is stolen from an airport in Luanda, Angola triggering an international terrorist investigation by the FBI and CIA. The aircraft and its pilots were never found.
- May 26 – Georges Rutaganda becomes the first person to be convicted of war crimes by the International Criminal Tribunal for Rwanda, and his previous charges are upheld.
- May 28 – Prometea, the world's first cloned horse, is born.
- May 30
  - The United Nations authorizes peacekeeping operations in the Ituri Province of the Democratic Republic of the Congo.
  - Opposition figures and peace activists, including Aung San Suu Kyi, are arrested in Myanmar.

=== June ===
- June 1 – The Strategic Offensive Reductions Treaty comes into effect between Russia and the United States.
- June 2 – Mars Express launches, containing the Beagle 2 lander.
- June 6 – An agreement is reached for the United Nations to form a Khmer Rouge Tribunal.
- June 8 – Poland approves joining the European Union in a referendum.
- June 10 – NASA launches the Spirit rover.
- June 12
  - Homo sapiens idaltu is proposed as a new human subspecies based on the Herto Man fossils.
  - The opening of a thousand-year-old coffin is broadcast live on Chinese television.
- June 14 – The Czech Republic approves joining the European Union in a referendum.
- June 15
  - Operation Desert Scorpion: U.S. forces in Iraq facilitate searches for Ba'athist forces, distribution of humanitarian aid, and engineering programs to repair damaged infrastructure.
  - The 50th Venice Biennale begins.
- June 20 – Former President of France Valéry Giscard d'Estaing presents his draft for a Constitution of the European Union.
- June 21
  - Declaration of Thessaloniki: The European Union encourages accession of states of the western Balkans.
  - The release of the novel Harry Potter and the Order of the Phoenix becomes a worldwide cultural event and boosts the literary industry.
  - Lennox Lewis vs. Vitali Klitschko: Boxer Lennox Lewis defends his title as heavyweight boxing champion against Vitali Klitschko.
- June 30 – Warring parties in the Democratic Republic of the Congo sign a peace accord, bringing an end to the Second Congo War.

=== July ===
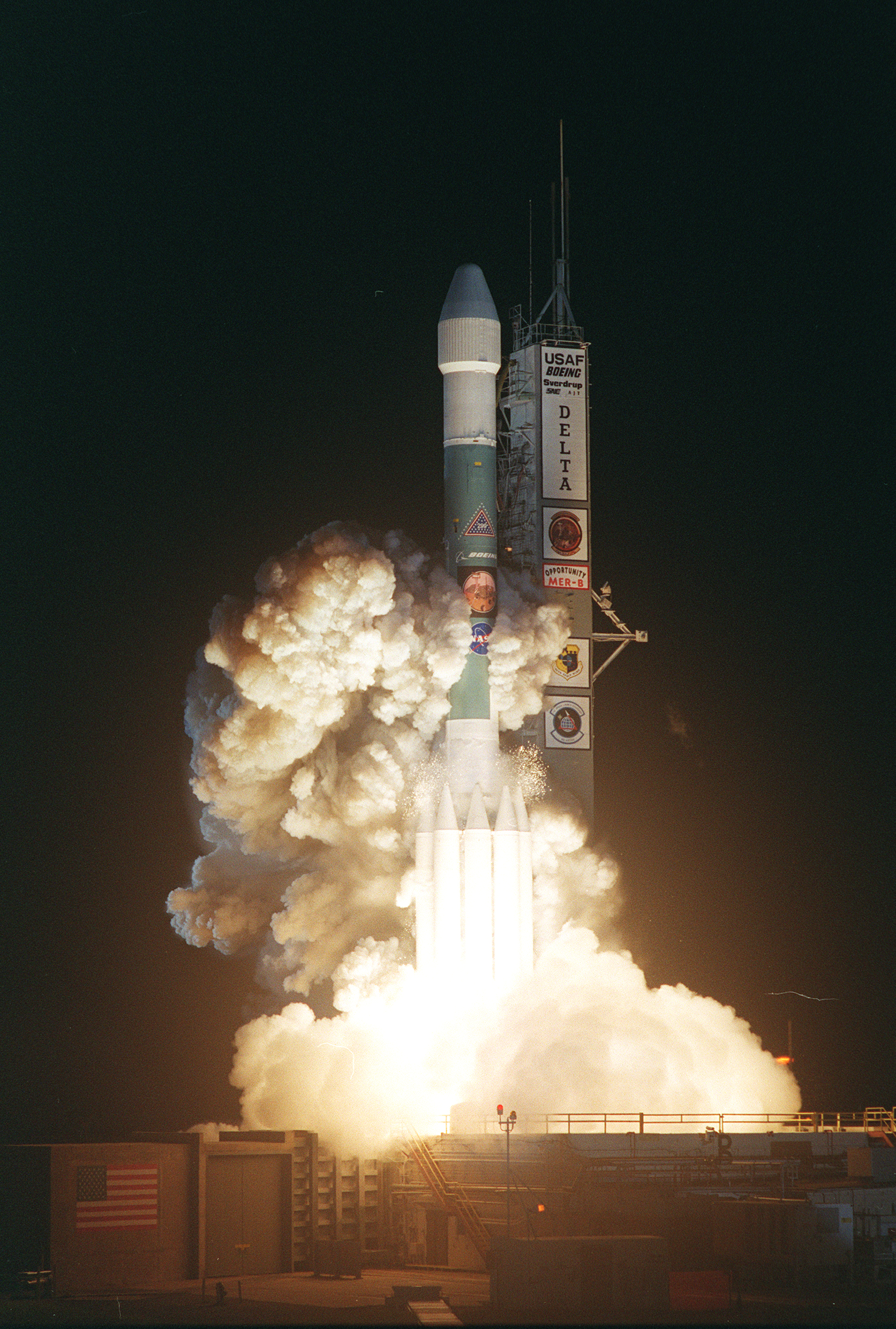
The Opportunity rover launches on board a Delta II rocket on July 7

- July–August – 2003 European heat wave: Europe experiences its hottest summer in over five centuries.
- July 1
  - The annual 1 July Marches in Hong Kong see hundreds of thousands of participants in response to the National Security (Legislative Provisions) Bill.
  - The Migrant Workers Convention comes into effect.
  - In a major development in football, English footballer David Beckham is transferred from Manchester United F.C. to Real Madrid CF for £17.25 million.
- July 5 – SARS is declared to be contained by the World Health Organization.
- July 7 – NASA launches the Opportunity rover.
- July 10
  - The existence of PSR B1620−26 b, the oldest known exoplanet in the galaxy, is confirmed using observations from the Hubble Space Telescope.
  - The Three Gorges Dam in China begins operating when the first of its 34 generators is activated.
- July 13 – The Iraqi Governing Council is created by the United States as an ethnically diverse provisional government of Iraq.
- July 15 – The United Self-Defense Forces of Colombia agrees to disband.
- July 16 – Major Fernando Pereira leads a failed coup against President Fradique de Menezes in São Tomé and Príncipe.
- July 18
  - The Convention on the Future of Europe finishes its work and proposes the first European Constitution.
  - The government of the Philippines signs a ceasefire with the Moro Islamic Liberation Front. It takes effect the next day.
- July 24 – The Regional Assistance Mission to the Solomon Islands, led by Australia, begins after ethnic violence engulfs the island country.
- July 28 – The Tasman Spirit oil spill occurs in Pakistan.
- July 30 – The final Volkswagen Beetle is produced.
- July 31 – Milomir Stakić receives the first life sentence issued by the International Criminal Tribunal for the former Yugoslavia.

=== August ===
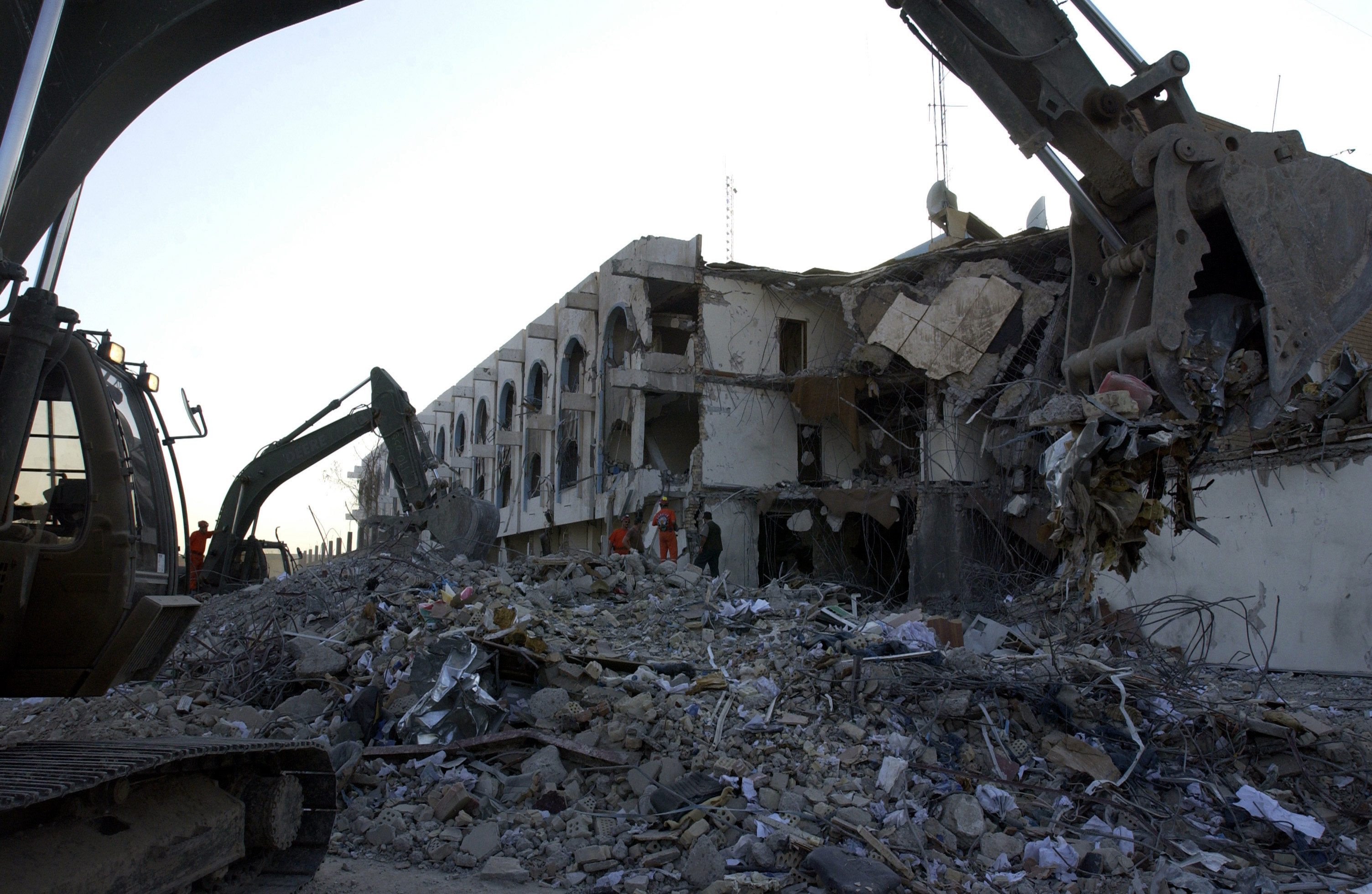
The Canal Hotel after a bombing occurs targeting United Nations personnel on August 19

- August 11
  - The Second Liberian Civil War ends after President Charles Taylor resigns and flees the country.
  - NATO takes over command of the peacekeeping force in Afghanistan, marking its first major operation outside Europe in its 54-year-history.
  - Riduan Isamuddin, head of the Indonesian Islamist group Jemaah Islamiyah, is arrested in Ayutthaya, Thailand.
- August 12 – The discovery of the dinosaur species Rajasaurus narmadensis is announced.
- August 14 – An overloaded power grid following the failure of FirstEnergy's alarm system in their control room causes the Northeast blackout of 2003, affecting more than 50 million people in the United States and Canada with nearly 100 related deaths.
- August 15 – Libya formally accepts civil responsibility for the bombing of Pan Am Flight 103 in 1988.
- August 16 – Element 110 is formally named darmstadtium by the International Union of Pure and Applied Chemistry.
- August 17 – Peace talks between Maoist rebels and the Nepalese government are interrupted by resumed hostilities in the Nepalese Civil War.
- August 18 – A peace agreement is reached to formally end the Second Liberian Civil War.
- August 19
  - In the Canal Hotel bombing in Baghdad, 22 people are killed, among them United Nations' Special Representative in Iraq Sérgio Vieira de Mello.
  - Shmuel HaNavi bus bombing: A Palestinian suicide bomber kills at least 18 people in a bus bombing in Jerusalem.
- August 20 – The G21 (later called the G20 developing nations) forms in response to disputes around the upcoming World Trade Organization Ministerial Conference of 2003.
- August 22 – The Brazilian VLS-1 launcher explodes on the launchpad on August 22, killing 21 people.
- August 25
  - The Spitzer Space Telescope is launched from Cape Canaveral, Florida.
  - Car bombs explode at Gateway of India and Zaveri Bazaar in Mumbai, claiming 54 lives and injuring 244 others. Pakistan-based Lashkar-e-Taiba is blamed for the attack. The attack causes an escalation in the Kashmir conflict.
- August 27
  - Mars makes its closest approach to Earth in over 60,000 years.
  - The first six-party talks, involving South and North Korea, the United States, China, Japan and Russia, convene to find a peaceful resolution to the security concerns of the North Korean nuclear weapons program.
- August 29 – Imam Ali mosque bombing: A bomb kills at least 125 people, including Mohammad Baqir al-Hakim, at a Shia mosque in Najaf, Iraq.

=== September ===
- September 2 – Typhoon Dujuan makes landfall in Guangdong as a category 1 typhoon with sustained winds of 90 mph.
- September 5 – Hurricane Fabian strikes Bermuda.
- September 9 – Armenia abolishes capital punishment entirely, following a law on August 1 that abolished it in most cases.
- September 10
  - Al-Qaeda leaders Osama bin Laden and Ayman al-Zawahiri release their first video statement since 2001.
  - The four-day World Trade Organization Ministerial Conference of 2003 begins in Cancún.
  - Swedish foreign minister Anna Lindh is murdered.
- September 11
  - The Cartagena Protocol on Biosafety comes into effect.
  - Cambodia and Nepal are approved for membership in the World Trade Organization.
- September 12 – Typhoon Maemi, makes landfall in South Korea as a category 3 typhoon with sustained winds of 125 mph.
- September 14
  - General Veríssimo Correia Seabra leads a bloodless coup against President Kumba Ialá in Guinea-Bissau. He steps down to create a new civilian government days later.
  - Estonia approves joining the European Union in a referendum.
  - Sweden rejects joining the Eurozone in a referendum.
- September 18 – Hurricane Isabel makes landfall in North Carolina.
- September 19 – The United Nations establishes the United Nations Mission in Liberia with Resolution 1509.
- September 20 – Latvia approves joining the European Union in a referendum.
- September 20–October 12 – The 2003 FIFA Women's World Cup is held in the United States after the tournament is moved from China due to the SARS outbreak. Germany win their first title after they defeated Sweden in the final with a golden goal.
- September 21 – NASA ends the Galileo probe mission after nearly 14 years by sending it into Jupiter's atmosphere.
- September 23
  - The ceasefire in the First Ivorian Civil War breaks down.
  - AMD releases the Athlon 64, the first 64-bit processor to be released for consumer use.
- September 24 – The Hubble Space Telescope starts the Hubble Ultra-Deep Field, making 800 exposures, until January 16, 2004.
- September 25 – Two parties in the Second Sudanese Civil War, the National Islamic Front and the Sudan People's Liberation Movement, reach a peace agreement.
- September 26 – The 8.3 M_{w} Tokachi earthquake occurs off the coast of Hokkaido.
- September 27 – SMART-1, an ESA spaceprobe and ESA's first mission to the moon, is launched from Kourou, French Guiana.
- September 29
  - Hurricane Kate first reaches hurricane status.
  - The United Nations Convention Against Transnational Organized Crime comes into force.

=== October ===
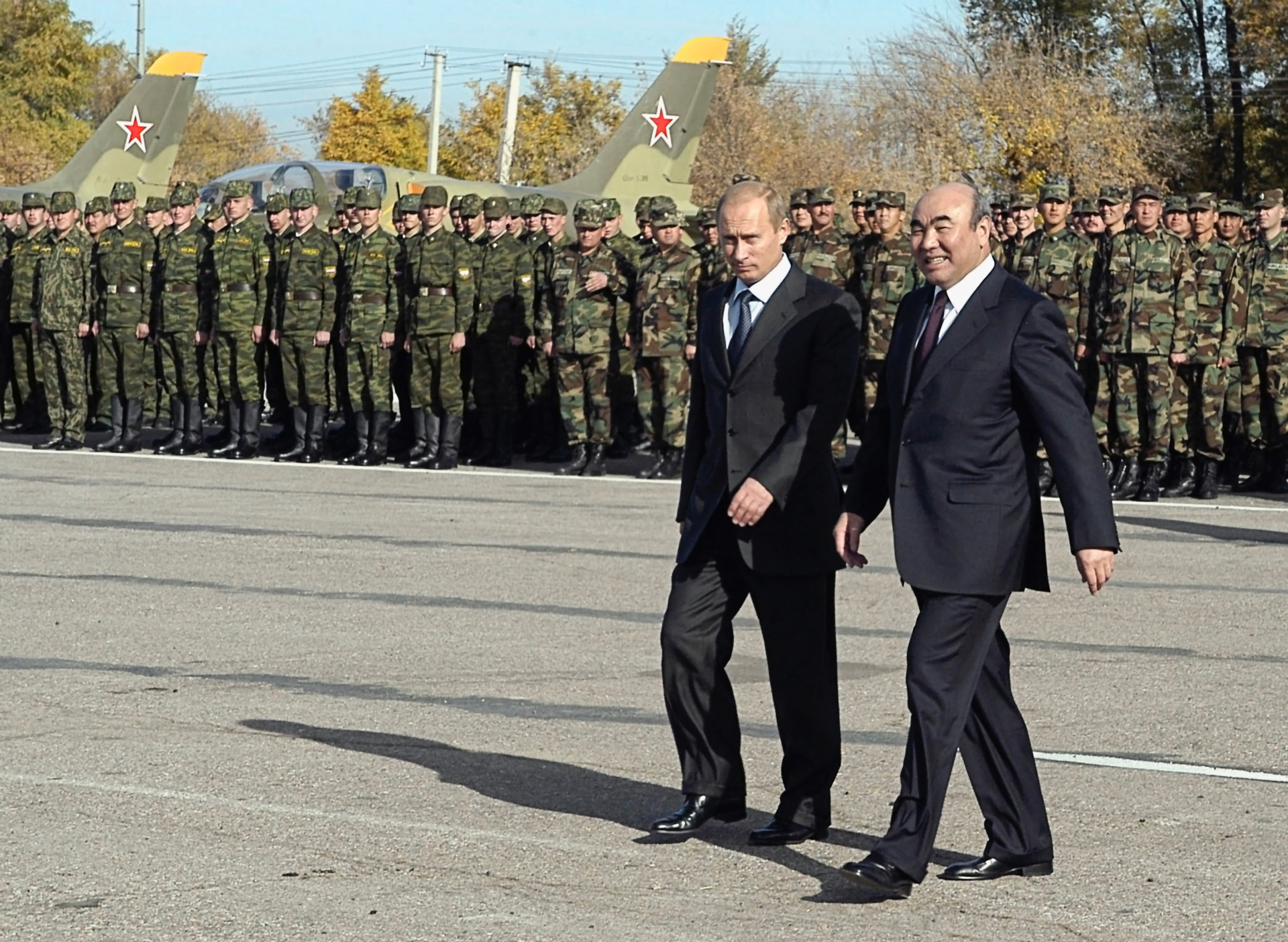
Russian President Vladimir Putin and Kyrgyz President Askar Akayev attend the inauguration of Kant Air Base on October 23

- October 4 – Maxim restaurant suicide bombing: A Palestinian suicide bomber attacks a restaurant in Haifa, Israel, killing at least 19 people.
- October 5 – Israeli warplanes strike alleged Islamic jihad bases inside Syrian territory, the first Israeli attack on the country since the 1973 Yom Kippur War.
- October 6 – Hezbollah and the Israel Defense Forces engage in hostilities in the Shebaa Farms.
- October 7 – Nokia releases a handheld game console, the N-Gage. It becomes a major critical failure in the gaming industry.
- October 10–November 22 – The 2003 Rugby World Cup is held in Australia and is won by England who defeated Australia in the final after extra time.
- October 14 – Gyude Bryant becomes President of Liberia as a compromise choice after former President Charles Taylor fled the country during the Second Liberian Civil War.
- October 15 – China launches Shenzhou 5, the country's first human spaceflight.
- October 16
  - Pope John Paul II holds mass to celebrate his 25th anniversary as pope, becoming the fourth pope to reach the milestone.
  - Argentine General Antonio Domingo Bussi is detained for crimes committed in the Dirty War.
- October 19 – Mother Teresa is beatified by Pope John Paul II.
- October 21 – After acknowledging that it has produced enriched uranium, Iran agrees to suspend its nuclear program.
- October 23
  - The Aarhus Protocol on Persistent Organic Pollutants comes into effect.
  - A Russian air base opens in Kant, Kyrgyzstan, as Russia's first foreign air base since the dissolution of the Soviet Union.
- October 24 – Concorde makes its last commercial flight, bringing the era of airliner supersonic travel to an end.
- October 16 – The United Nations Security Council adopts Resolution 1511 to approve American-led governance in Iraq.
- October 27
  - 27 October 2003 Baghdad bombings: A series of car bombings occur in Baghdad, Iraq, targeting multiple police stations and a Red Cross headquarters. Approximately 40 people are killed.
  - Russian businessman Mikhail Khodorkovsky is arrested. Critics allege that this is a political action by the government to control Russian oligarchs.

=== November ===
- November 6 – The International Court of Justice rules in the Oil Platforms case that the United States was not justified in its 1987 attacks on Iranian oil platforms but that neither party violated a 1955 treaty.
- November 14 – The dwarf planet Sedna is discovered by a team of astronomers led by Michael E. Brown from the Palomar Observatory.
- November 15 – Suicide bombings occur in Istanbul. Further attacks occur five days later. They kill 63 people between them, making them the two deadliest terror attacks in Turkey, and cause uncertainty in the international economy.
- November 22 – Baghdad DHL attempted shootdown incident: Shortly after takeoff, a DHL Express cargo plane is struck on the left wing by a surface-to-air missile fired by the Islamic Army in Iraq and forced to land. All three crew members survive without injuries.
- November 23 – A ceasefire is reached at the Line of Control in Kashmir.
- November 26 – The supersonic passenger jet, Concorde, makes its last ever flight from Heathrow Airport in London to Bristol Filton Airport.

=== December ===
- December 5 – Trial of Stanislav Galić: The International Criminal Tribunal for the former Yugoslavia sentences Stanislav Galić to 20 years in prison for crimes against humanity.
- December 9 – The United Nations Convention Against Corruption is opened for signing.
- December 13 – Saddam Hussein, the former president of Iraq, is captured in the small town of Ad-Dawr by the U.S. Army.
- December 19
  - Libya agrees to eliminate all of its materials, equipment, and programs aimed at producing weapons of mass destruction.
  - The Beagle 2 Mars lander deploys, but contact is lost.
- December 26 – The 6.6 M_{w} Bam earthquake occurs in Iran.
- December 29 – The Protocol on Heavy Metals comes into effect.

== Nobel Prizes ==

- Chemistry – Peter Agre, Roderick MacKinnon
- Literature – J. M. Coetzee
- Peace – Shirin Ebadi
- Physics – Alexei Abrikosov, Vitaly Ginzburg, Sir Anthony James Leggett
- Physiology or Medicine – Paul Lauterbur, Sir Peter Mansfield
- Nobel Memorial Prize in Economic Sciences – Robert F. Engle, Clive W. J. Granger
