= Still Life with Peacocks =

Painting by Rembrandt

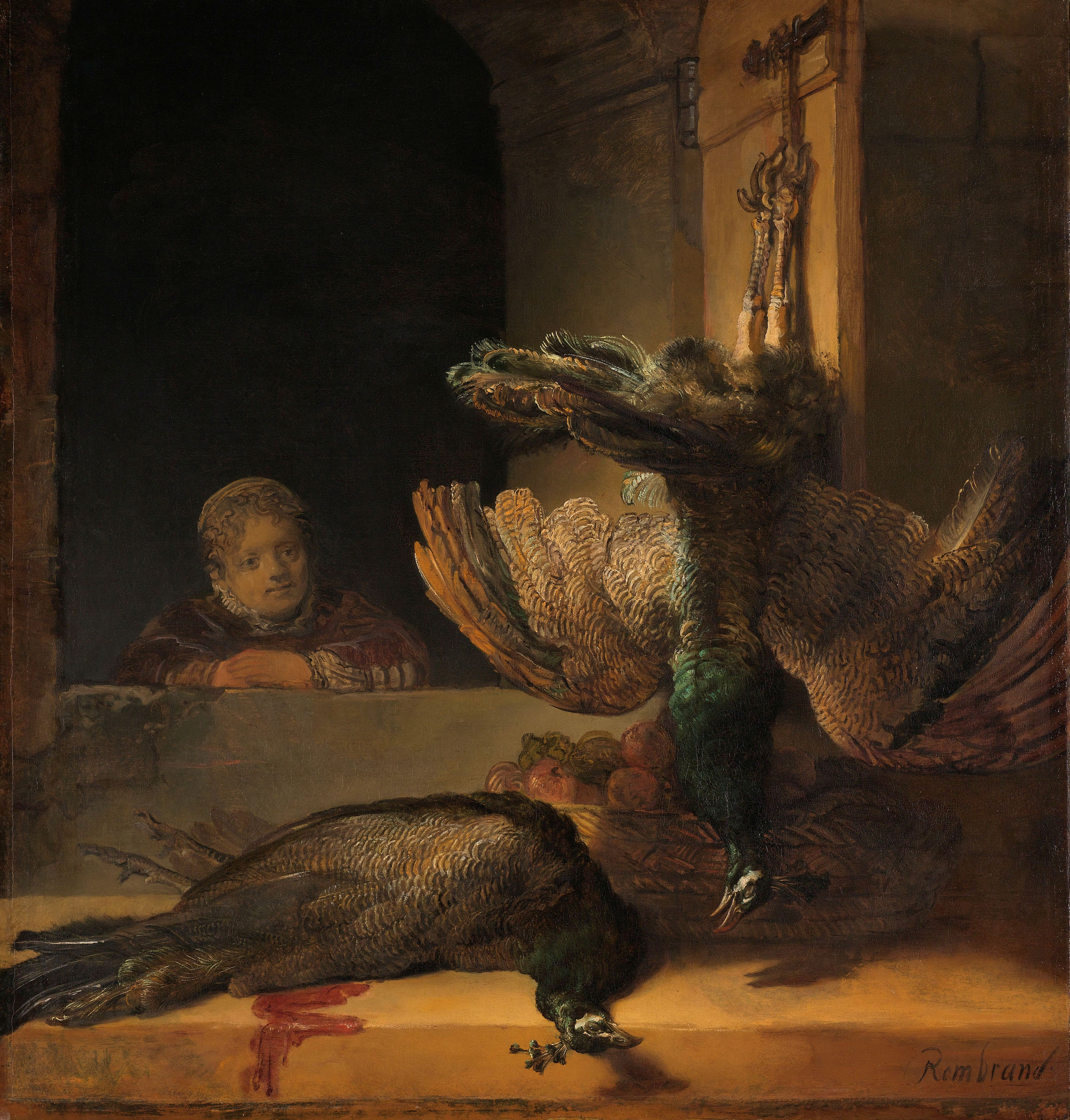
- Artist: Rembrandt
- Year: c. 1639
- Medium: canvas, oil paint
- Dimensions: 145 cm (57 in) × 135.5 cm (53.3 in)
- Location: Rijksmuseum Amsterdam
- Owner: William Cornwallis Cartwright
- Accession: 2418, 4299

Still Life with Peacocks is a c. 1639 painting by Rembrandt, now in the Rijksmuseum Amsterdam.

== Content ==
It depicts a girl in a crimson velvet jacket, leaning in a stone window. She is looking at two dead peacocks. One of them is hung from a wooden window shutter. The other lies on a stone plinth near a pool of blood. There is also a basket of fruit on the plinth. The work is one of the few still lifes that Rembrandt painted. The motif of a figure in a stone window with objects was later further developed by Rembrandt's pupil Gerrit Dou.

== Attribution ==
The work appears to be signed 'Rembrand' at the lower right. However, x-rays show that the work is signed Rembrandt. The R as well as the d and t appear to have been painted over. Not all art historians agree that this signature is authentic. The authenticity of the work itself is not in doubt.

== Provenance ==
The work is first mentioned in the inventory of the estate of Clara de Valaer (or Clara van Verlaer), widow of Hendrik van Domselaer, drawn up in Amsterdam on 16 October 1660. It appears there as 'Een stuck synde twee pauwen ende een kint van Rembrandt'. In September 1685 it was mentioned in the inventory of the estate of her son Tobias van Domselaer in Amsterdam as 'a large painting with two peacocks by Rembrandt'.

On 12 May 1734 a painting by Rembrandt with the subject 'Doode vogels' ['Dead birds'] was auctioned during the sale of the collection of Willem Six at auctioneer Gerrit Schoemakers in Amsterdam. It is uncertain whether this is this painting.

In 1819, it was in the possession of the British politician William Ralph Cartwright, who loaned it to an exhibition in London that year. Cartwright possibly inherited the work from his aunt Catherine Ann Blackwood (d. 1804), who in turn may have inherited it from her father-in-law, Colonel John Blackwood (d. 1777). Later, at least until 1915, it was in the possession of his grandson, William Cornwallis Cartwright.

According to Frederik Schmidt Degener, it was acquired in 1918 before the end of World War I by the art dealer Frederik Muller & Co. in Amsterdam. From 1918 to 1942 it was in the possession of Jean Joseph Marie Chabot, who loaned it to the Rijksmuseum Amsterdam between 1923 and 1942. On 21 July 1942, it was illegally sold by Chabot, together with two other paintings, for 800,000 guilders to the art dealer Erhard Göpel, who bought it for Adolf Hitler's planned Führermuseum in Linz. On 9 October 1945, it was transferred by the Americans via the Central Collecting Point to the Dutch government, who placed it with the Stichting Nederlands Kunstbezit. This foundation loaned it to the Rijksmuseum in 1948, which acquired definitive ownership of it on 24 February 1960.

== See also ==
- List of paintings by Rembrandt

== Sources ==
- https://hdl.handle.net/10934/RM0001.COLLECT.5220
