= Tasman Spirit oil spill =

2003 oil spill in Karachi

- Interactive map of Tasman Spirit oil spill
- Location: Port of Karachi, Karachi, Pakistan
- Coordinates: 24.782683°N 66.995352°E
- Date: July 27, 2003; 23 years ago

Cause
- Cause: Grounding of the Tasman Spirit oil tanker
- Operator: Assimina Maritime Ltd.

Spill characteristics
- Volume: 27,000 metric tonnes
- Shoreline impacted: 16 km (9.9 mi)

On 27 July 2003, an oil spill occurred in the Arabian Sea just outside the Port of Karachi, Karachi, Pakistan, when Tasman Spirit, an oil tanker owned by Maltese company Assimina Maritime, originating from Kharg Island, Iran, ran aground while navigating to the Port of Karachi, at Clifton Beach, at 12:57 p.m. local time and spilled approximately 30,000 metric tonnes of light crude oil over the next several days. It is considered to be one of the worst human-caused environmental disasters in Pakistan. The Tasman Spirit spill eventually affected 16 kilometres (9.9 mi) of the main public beach of the city, and the Port of Karachi, which were heavily or moderately oiled.

== Spill ==
The ship was carrying 67,532 metric tons of oil, of which about 27,000 tons were spilled into the Arabian Sea. The ship was being piloted into the Port of Karachi at the time of the accident when it ran aground in the navigational channel of the port. As a consequence of the initial grounding, the hull was damaged and small quantities of crude oil spilled. The ship's forward part was firmly aground and stuck in mud and silt and the middle section rested on a rock. Heavy winds and the swell of south western monsoon resulted in structural stress on the hull and cracks began to appear on the hull in the subsequent days and the ship began to break up. By August 14, the ship had split into two, releasing some 27,000 tons of its light crude oil cargo into the Arabian Sea. During this time, efforts were made to salvage the remaining crude oil on board and a number of smaller tankers including M. T. Endeavor II, SB-408, M.V. Fair Jolly, M. T. Sea Angel and M. T. Umka were used to salvage over half of the stricken ship's crude oil.

By 15 August, 20,000 tonnes of the 67,000-tonne cargo were removed from the ship, according to the Greece-based Polembros Shipping. Around 37,500 tonnes of oil was emptied in a 15-day operation. The oil spillage finally stopped in late August.
