= Otto Verhagen =

Dutch painter (1919–2003)

- Born: 19 May 1919; Maarssen
- Died: 2003 (aged 83–84)

Otto Verhagen (19 May 1919 – 2003) was a Dutch painter, draftsman and museum director.

== Life and work ==
Son of Otto Verhagen (1885–1951) and Jantje Jantiena Roelfina (Annie) Bennink (1891–1978), from 1948 to 1951, Verhagen worked for the Dutch organization responsible for tracking down Nazi-looted art, known as the "Stichting Nederlands Kunstbezit". He then worked for the Dienst Rijks Verspreide Kunstvoorwerpen from1951 to 1970), and as a civil servant with the Ministry of Culture, Recreation and Social Work, he was involved in the Beeldende Kunstenaars Regeling (BKR).

Verhagen became director of the Deventer Municipal Museums in 1971, a position he would hold until 1981.

In 1999 Verhagen donated his archive to the Netherlands Institute for Art History. The Geldersche Kasteelen Foundation owns a collection of his drawings and also an archive section.
