= Descent into Limbo (Mantegna) =

1492 painting by Andrea Mantegna

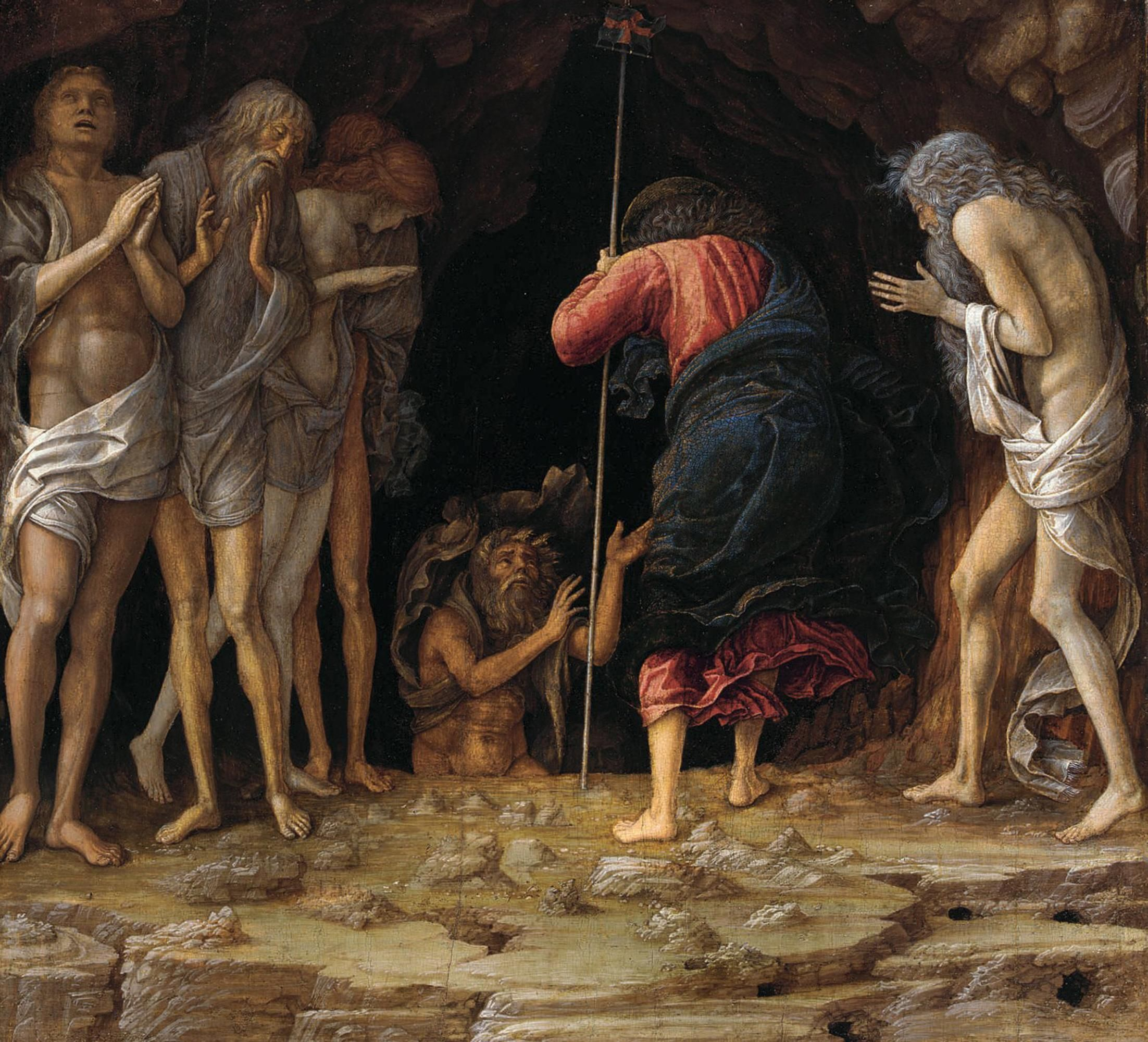
- Artist: Andrea Mantegna
- Year: 1492
- Medium: tempera and gold on panel
- Dimensions: 38.8 cm × 42.3 cm (15.3 in × 16.7 in)
- Location: Unknown

Descent into Limbo is a 1492 painting in tempera and gold on panel by Andrea Mantegna, formerly in the Barbara Piasecka Johnson Collection in Princeton, New Jersey. It depicts the Descent into Limbo of Jesus Christ. There are also drawings of the subject by Mantegna in the École Supérieure des Beaux-Arts in Paris, whilst Giovanni Bellini also painted the subject.

It had been considered lost for centuries, but was authenticated and included in an important exhibition on the artist at the Royal Academy of Arts in 1992. It left the Barbara Piasecka Johnson Collection when it was auctioned in 2003, fetching $25.5 million . The painting had previously been loaned to the Frick Collection in New York; it is said that the intention was to sell it to the museum, but the deal fell through due to disagreements over the price.

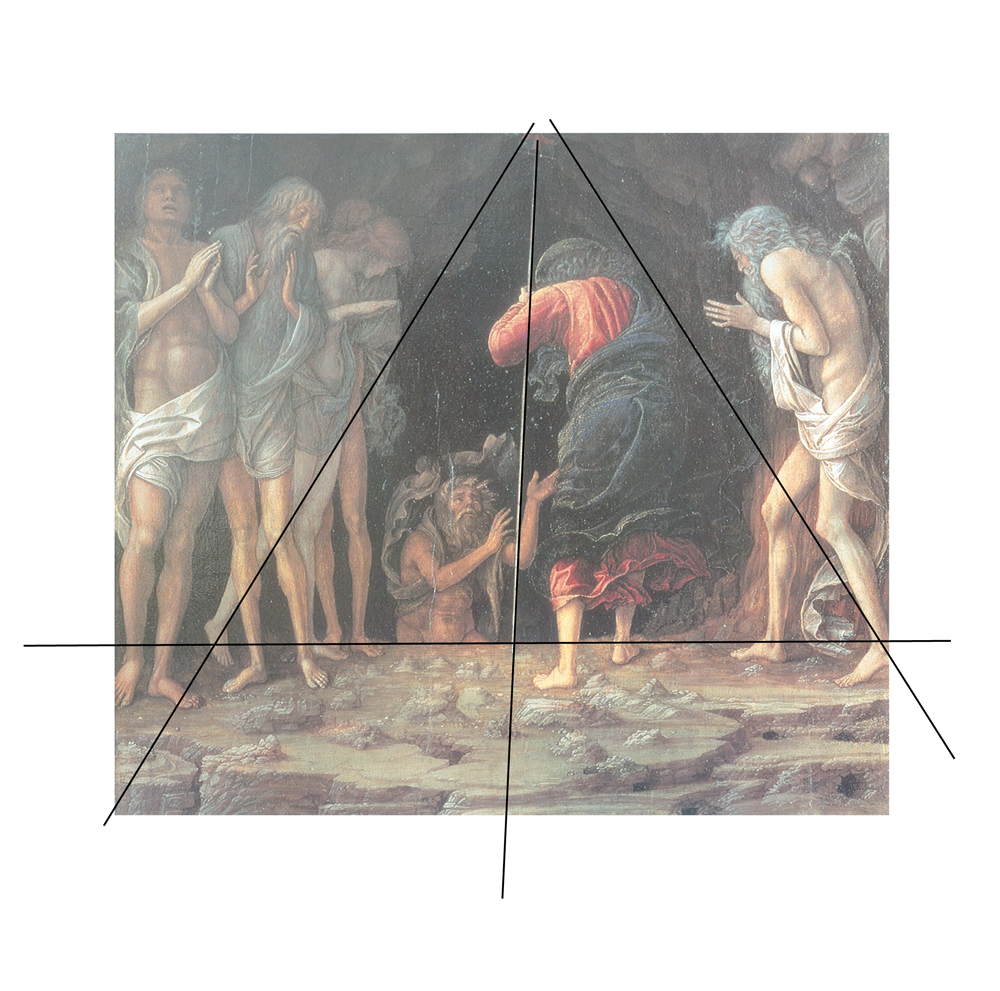
Geometric scheme of the composition

== Missing part ==
Studies for the catalogue Accademia Carrara, Bergamo Dipinti Italiani del Trecento e del Quattrocento (edited by Giovanni Valagussa), included a painting owned by the Accademia Carrara (Bergamo) from 1866. It had formerly been considered to be a studio work, under the title Resurrection. During the studies it was re-identified as the upper part of Descent into Limbo, thanks to a small cross divided between the two parts.

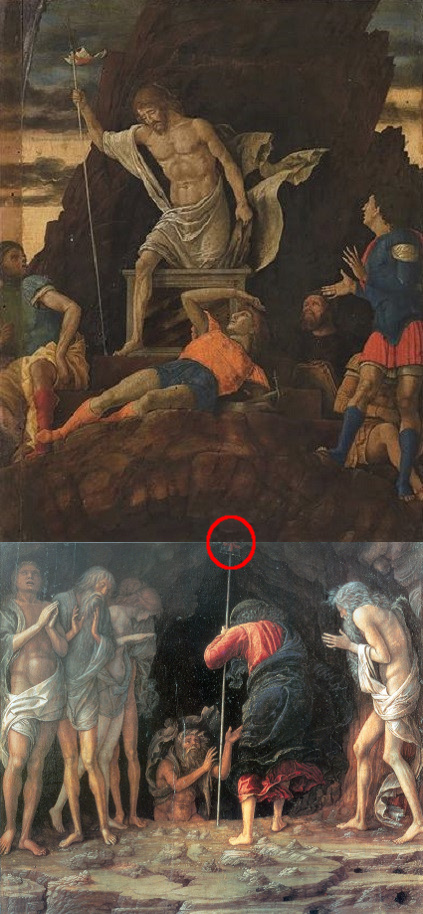
The whole work

== Bibliography ==
- (in Italian) Tatjana Pauli, Mantegna, serie Art Book, Leonardo Arte, Milano 2001. ISBN 9788883101878
