= 2003 Columbus, Ohio arson =

2003 arson in Ohio

- Date: 13 April 2003; 23 years ago
- Time: 4:00 AM
- Location: 64 East 17th Avenue, Columbus, Ohio, United States; 40.002306°N 83.006701°W
- Type: Arson
- Motive: Unknown
- Deaths: Alan Schlessman (21); Kyle Raulin (20); Andrea Dennis (20); Erin DeMarco (19); Christine Wilson (19)
- Injuries: 3
- Suspects: Robert Patterson
- Convictions: None

On 13 April 2003, a fire was set at a house in the University District of Columbus, Ohio, killing five university students (two from Ohio State University and three from Ohio University). Despite an arrest early on, the murders have remained unsolved.

== Events ==
Prior to the fire, a party was being hosted at the house where 12 OSU students lived for the 21st birthday of Ohio State University student Alan Schlessman. Around 200 people had attended the party, with 16 staying afterwards. Sometime during the night a fire was started at the front door of the house. Eight students managed to escape on their own while three more were rescued by the fire department through the back door when they arrived a 4:05. All five victims were found on the second floor of the house, and had died from carbon monoxide poisoning and smoke inhalation.

== Victims ==
The five victims of the fire were:

- Alan Schlessman, OSU student from Sandusky, Ohio
- Kyle Raulin, OSU student from West Chester Township, Ohio
- Andrea Dennis, Ohio University student from Madeira, Ohio
- Erin DeMarco, Ohio University student from Canton, Ohio
- Christine Wilson, Ohio University student from Dublin, Ohio

== Suspect ==
A vagrant with prior conviction, Robert Patterson was arrested four months after the fire. Investigators from the Columbus Police Department said that at some point Patterson had implicated himself in the crime. Despite this the charges were dropped by the prosecutor due to lack of evidence.
