= Operation Allied Harmony =

NATO operation

- Part of 2001 insurgency in Macedonia
- Operational scope: Stabilization of Government control of country
- Location: Republic of Macedonia
- Executed by: NATO, sanctioned by the UN

Operation Allied Harmony was a NATO-led military operation in the Republic of Macedonia from December 2002 to April 2003.

The operation was tasked with protecting observers from the Organization for Security and Co-operation in Europe, who were monitoring the implementation of the peace plan for Macedonia, where the government and Albanian groups had been in violent conflict. It was also to provide military advice to the Macedonian government. It was intended that the EU would take over responsibility for this operation with EUFOR Concordia, but the EU was not ready to take over at that time. Operation Allied Harmony had itself taken over for Operation Amber Fox. The force, which consisted of around 400 men, was in operation from 16 December 2002 to 31 March 2003.
