= MT Tasman Spirit =

Oil tanker

Tasman Spirit was a Greek registered oil tanker. The tanker was launched in February 1979 and was formerly called Mabini and Kenko.

== Tasman Spirit oil spill ==
On July 27, 2003, she ran aground near the city of Karachi whilst on approach to the Port of Karachi. Over the next few days more than 33,000 tons of oil spilled into the Arabian Sea in what is considered by some to be the largest environmental disaster in Pakistan's history. Cracks started appearing on the ship's hull on August 13 and the ship began to break up. By August 17, the ship had split into two, releasing some 12,000 tons of its light crude oil cargo into the Arabian Sea. According to the IUCN, 16 kilometres of coastline was polluted.

The ship's insurer offered 10 million rupees (about $180,000 US dollars in 2003) in compensation to the Karachi port authorities, and agreed to pay all cleaning expenses.
