= Nederlands Kunstbezit-collectie =

Dutch art collection of recovered World War II works

The Nederlands Kunstbezit-collectie (NK collection) is an art collection of recovered works of art that accrued to the Dutch state after World War II. This concerns works of art that were looted by the Nazi regime in the Netherlands or were purchased under duress or otherwise. The collection is managed by the Cultural Heritage Agency and is part of the national collection. The works may be on loan from Dutch museums or government buildings, and some are also stored in depots.

== History ==
Nazi Germany plundered artworks in every country it controlled from Jewish collectors, museums, libraries and churches. After the defeat of Nazi Germany in World War II, the Allied Monuments Men located the stolen artworks and returned them to the governments of the countries where they had been stolen, with the understanding that the governments would then restitute them to their original owners. In many cases, however, the receiving countries kept the artworks and did not restitute them.

Nazi-looted artworks recovered by the Allies and restituted after 1945 to the Netherlands came under the administration of the Dutch state. The state had the task of restoring the works to their rightful owners or their heirs; the Netherlands Art Property Foundation (SNK) was established for this purpose. There were problems. Many artworks that had been looted from Jewish owners were not restituted to the heirs due to lengthy and difficult procedures, as in the case of the Goudstikker heirs. As a result of abuses, the SNK was disbanded on 1 July 1950 and its activities transferred to the Ministry of Finance. The national interest seemed to prevail; for example, the Ministry of Finance saw the collection as a means of replenishing the State treasury. From 1949 to 1953, auctions took place of items that could not be returned, and the artworks that eventually remained were placed in the NK collection. Officials working for the Stichting Nederlands Kunstbezit included the Monuments Men Robert de Vries (1905-1983), Nicolaas Rudolph Alexander Vroom (1915-1995), Louis Jacob Florus Wijsenbeek (1912-1985), Karel Gerald Boon (1909-1996), David Cornelis Röell, Jonkheer (1894-1961) and the Dutch painter Otto Verhagen (1919-2003).

In 1998, the Origins Unknown Agency ("Herkomst Gezocht") (BHG) was established with the aim of conducting systematic research into the provenance history of all individual works of art. At the start of the research, the collection consisted of some 4,700 items, including paintings, drawings, prints, ceramics, as well as silver, carpets and furniture. The BHG's research ran until 2005, and since 2001 several hundred works from the NK Collection have been returned.

In 2002 a study was published, Betwist bezit, which was commissioned by the BHG and concluded that in the early years of the SNK the priority was not the return of looted art to its rightful owners. "It did not take long before they concluded: we can better house them in a museum. Restitution was secondary."

The Origins Unknown Agency was dissolved in 2007.

After the disbandment of the BHG, the database and accompanying website they compiled came under the management of NIOD's Expertise Center for Restitution, as of 2018.

In 2020 a Dutch commission found the Netherlands' art restitution panel showed "too little empathy" to victims of Nazi aggression and sided too often with museums.

On January 1, 2022, the BHG database and website were transferred to the Cultural Heritage Agency with a new online NK Collection portal.

== See also ==
- Restitutions Committee (Netherlands)
- The Holocaust in the Netherlands
- Jacques Goudstikker
- Friedrich Gutmann
- List of claims for restitution for Nazi-looted art
- Liro bank
- List of most visited museums in the Netherlands
