= Geography of Switzerland =

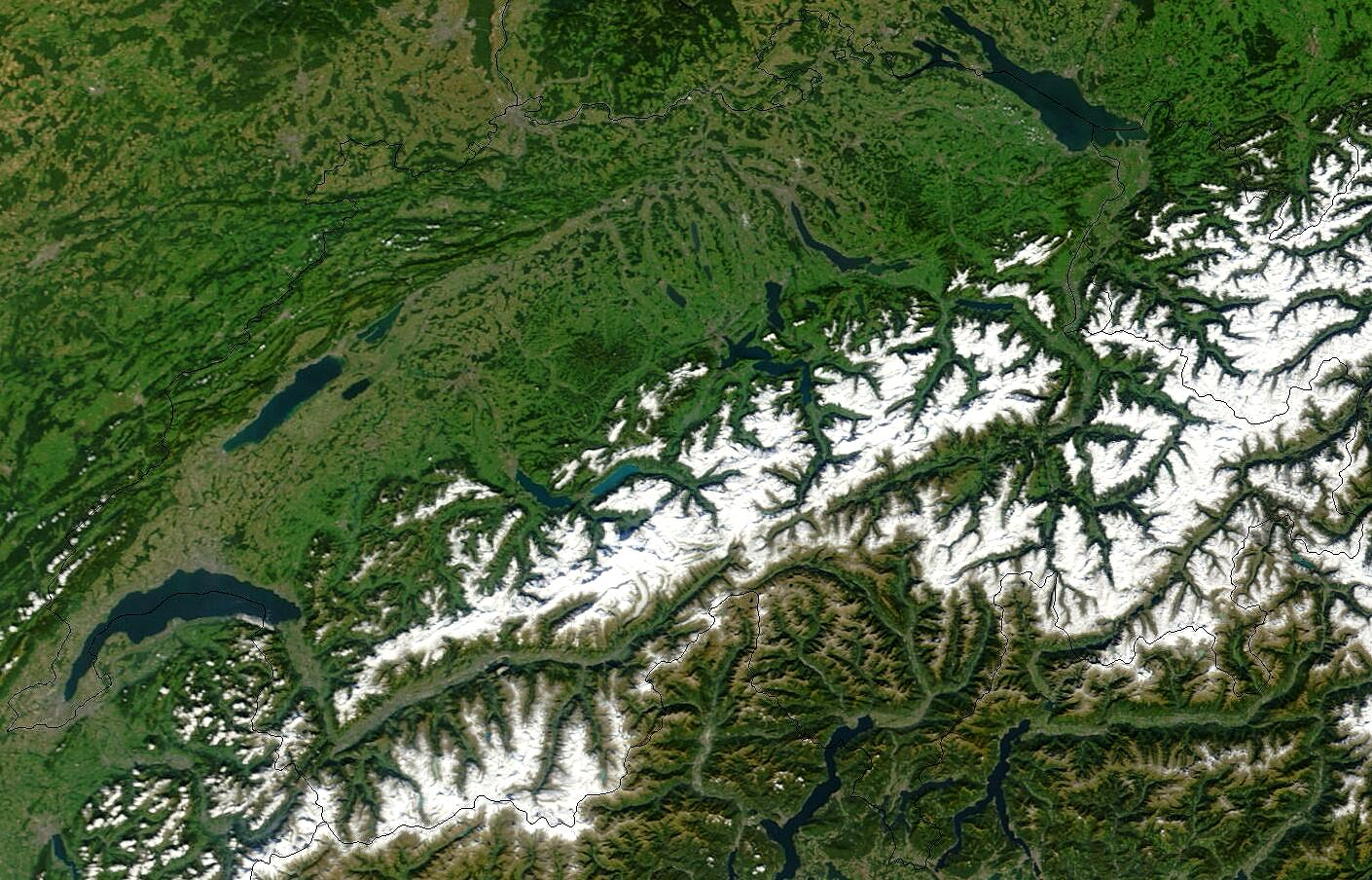
- Continent: Europe
- Region: Western/Central Europe
- Coordinates: 47° N 8° E
- Area: Ranked 134
  - Total: 41,293.2 km^{2} (15,943.4 sq mi)
  - Land: 95.8%
  - Water: 4.2%
- Coastline: 0 km (0 mi)
- Borders: Total land borders: 1,852 km (1,151 mi); Italy: 734.2 km (456.2 mi); France: 571.8 km (355.3 mi); Germany: 345.7 km (214.8 mi); Austria: 165.1 km (102.6 mi); Liechtenstein: 41.1 km (25.5 mi)
- Highest point: Dufourspitze: 4,634 m
- Lowest point: Lake Maggiore: 193 m
- Longest river: Rhine: 375.5 km (longest entirely in Switzerland: Aare)
- Largest lake: Lake Geneva (largest entirely in Switzerland: Lake Neuchâtel)

The geography of Switzerland features a mountainous landlocked country located in Western and Central Europe. Switzerland's natural landscape is marked by its numerous lakes and mountains. It is surrounded by five countries: Austria and Liechtenstein to the east, France to the west, Italy to the south and Germany to the north. Switzerland has a maximum north–south length of 220 kilometres (140 mi) and an east–west length of about 350 kilometres (220 mi).

Switzerland is well known for the Alps in the south and south east. North of the Alps, the Swiss Plateau runs along the east–west axis of the country. Most of the population of Switzerland lives on the rolling hills and plains of the plateau. The smaller Jura Mountains are located on the north west side of the plateau. Much of the northern border with Germany follows the Rhine, though the Rhine enters Switzerland near Schaffhausen. The eastern border with Germany and a portion of Austria is drawn through Lake Constance (German: Bodensee). A portion of the southwest border with France is drawn through Lake Geneva.

Switzerland is divided into 26 sovereign cantons. The cantons along the Swiss Plateau tend to be the most populous, industrial and religiously Protestant. The cantons in the Alps tend to be less populous, Catholic, and have an agrarian or tourism-based economy.

Switzerland is divided by language as well. There are four national languages: German (spoken by 63.7% of population), French (by 20.4% of population), Italian (by 6.5%) and Romansh (0.5%). From Bern east (except in the canton of Ticino) the population generally speaks German. West of Bern, the population generally speaks French. In the southern canton of Ticino, most people speak Italian. Romansh, a group of dialects descended from Vulgar Latin, is spoken in several regions in the canton of Graubünden.

== Physical description ==
Satellite image of Switzerland

Switzerland extends between the parallels 45°49'05 and 47°48'30 lat. and the meridians 5° 57'23 and 10°29'31 long. It forms an irregular quadrilateral, of which the greatest length from east to west is 350 kilometres (220 mi), and the greatest breadth from north to south is nearly 220 kilometres (140 mi). Switzerland is a landlocked country, the closest coastline being at the Gulf of Genoa, 160 km south of Chiasso. Its political boundaries often do not coincide with those of nature. The entire canton of Ticino is south of the Alps, as are the valleys of Simplon (Valais), Mesocco, Bregaglia, Poschiavo and Müstair (all in Graubünden); except for a very small part of municipality of Stein am Rhein the whole of the canton of Schaffhausen, part of that of the canton of Basel-City, and a small part of the canton of Zürich are north of the Rhine, while the majority of Graubünden lies to the east of the Rhine basin, and Porrentruy is far down on the western slope of the Jura. Putting these exceptional cases aside, the physical geography of Switzerland may thus be described:

- On the south runs the main chain of the Alps, which is joined (at Mont Dolent near Martigny) by the lower ranges that rise south of Lake Geneva and continue until Piz Lad to the east.
- To the north of this main chain there is another great range of mountains (wholly Swiss) only slightly inferior in extent and height, which starts from the hills known as the Jorat range above Lausanne, reaches maximum in the great snowy summits of the Bernese Alps and the Tödi group, before trending to the north near Chur and, after rising once more in the Säntis group, dies away on the southern shore of Lake Constance.
- The Swiss portion of the main chain of the Alps and the great northern outlier run parallel to each other from Martigny to near Chur, while for a short distance they actually unite near Pizzo Rotondo (west of the St Gotthard Pass), parting again near the Oberalp Pass (east of the St Gotthard). Between these two great snowclad ranges flow two of the mightiest European rivers, the Rhône towards the west and the Rhine towards the east, their headwaters being only separated by the tangled mountain mass between Pizzo Rotondo and the Oberalp Pass, which sends the Reuss towards the north and the Ticino towards the south.
- To the north of the great northern outlier rises the Jura range, a huge spur of the Alps (with which it is connected by the Jorat range), while between the northern outlier and the Jura extends what may be called the plains or plateau of Switzerland, consisting almost wholly of the undulating valley of the Aare (below Thun) with its numerous affluents. To that river valley, the valley of the Thur (a direct affluent of the Rhine), that lies between the Aare basin and the Rhine basin (Lake Constance) must be added.

Putting aside the valleys of the Ticino and Inn, Switzerland may thus be described as consisting of three great river valleys (Rhône, Rhine and Aare) with the smaller one of the Thur, which all lie to the north of the main chain of the Alps and include the region between the Alps and the Jura. If matters are examined more carefully, it can be noted that the Rhône and Rhine valleys are shut off from that of the Aare (and of the Thur) by the great northern outlier of the Alps, which consists of the Bernese and Glarus Alps. Two wide and undulating valleys (Aare and Thur) and two deeply cut trenches (Rhône and Rhine) thus lie on the northern slope of the Alps, to the north and south respectively of the great northern outlier of the Alps. The main chain of the Alps rises in Swiss territory to the height of 4,634 metres (15,203 ft) in the loftiest summit or Dufourspitze (wholly Swiss) of Monte Rosa, though the Dom (4,545 metres (14,911 ft)), in the Mischabel range, is the highest mountain mass which is entirely within Switzerland. The great northern outlier attains a height of 4,274 metres (14,022 ft) in the Finsteraarhorn, while the lowest level (193 metres (633 ft)) within the Confederation, is on Lake Maggiore (on the course of the Ticino). The highest permanently inhabited village in Switzerland is Juf (2,126 metres (6,975 ft)) at the head of the high Alpine valley Avers (the Averser Rhein being a tributary of the Rhine), while the lowest is Ascona (196 metres (643 ft)), on Lake Maggiore.

Simple map of Switzerland

Detailed map of Switzerland

== Geology ==
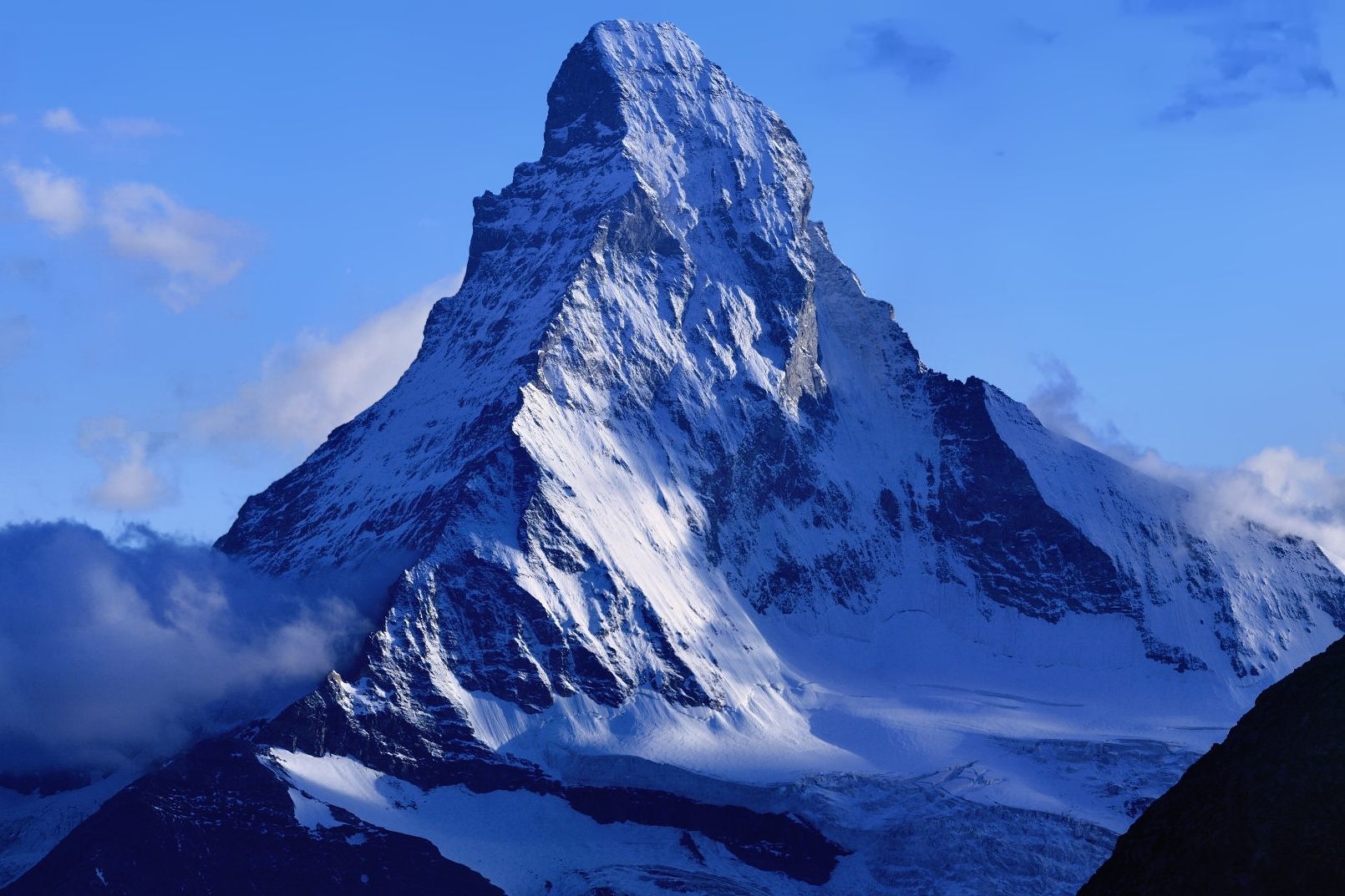
The Matterhorn, a geomorphosite of the Alps and natural symbol of Switzerland

Different geological phenomena shaped the actual landscapes of Switzerland. The Alpine orogeny had the most visible effects on the landscape: this term covers entire geological movements contributing to the Alps’ formation.

A crystalline basement formed at the beginning of the Paleozoic era, between 540 and 360 million years ago. Later, between 205 and 96 million years ago, the alpine ocean or Tethys Ocean formed between Eurasia and Africa. The ocean reached its maximum width at the end of Jurassic period, 135 million years ago. The collision between the Eurasian and African plates made it progressively disappear. This plate collision (still in progress) began 100 million years ago. The Alps resulted from this geological movement, the two plates creating folding zones. The Central Plateau is mainly composed of molasse, a sedimentary rock that formed at the bottom of the Tethys ocean.

Switzerland is situated in a relatively tectonically inactive area, although the city of Basel was completely destroyed in 1356 by an earthquake, the largest historical seismic event in central Europe. The most seismically active regions are the Rhine Rift Valley (region of Basel) and the Valais.

== Physiographic divisions ==
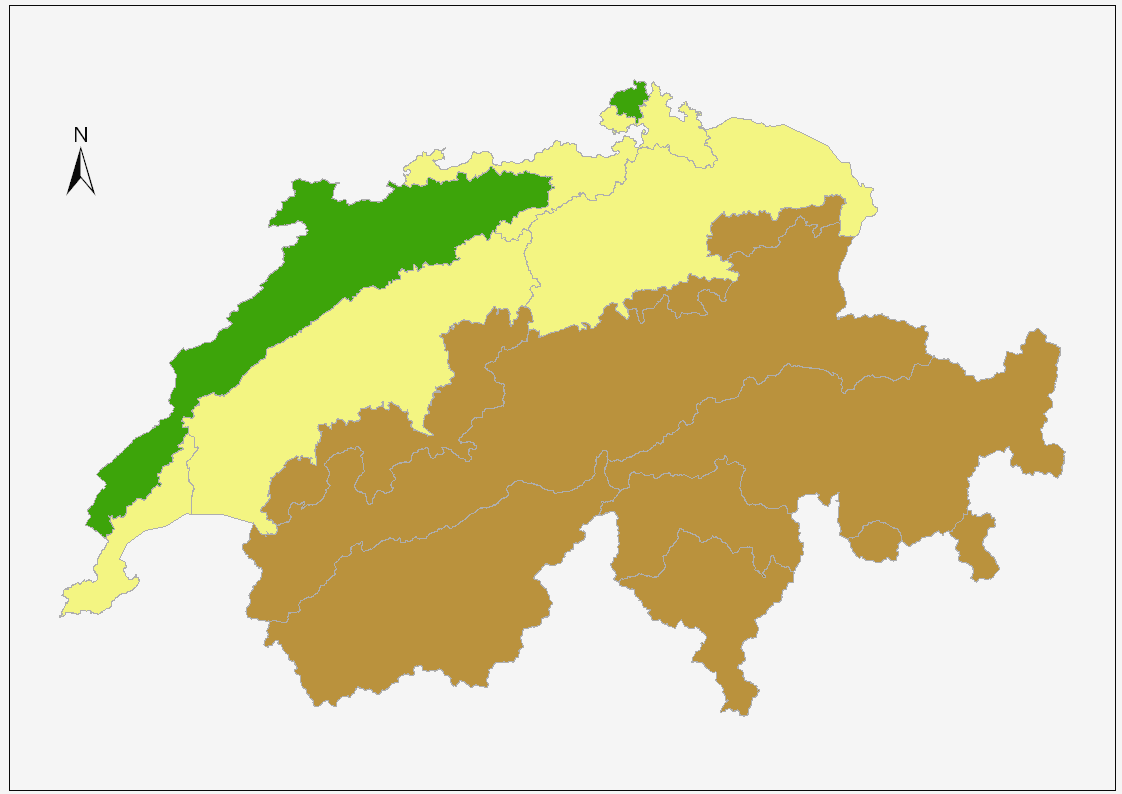
The three main geographic regions: Jura Plateau Alps

Switzerland is divided in three main geographic regions: the Swiss Alps, the Central Plateau and the Jura, each corresponding to very different geological realities. In addition, two small regions are not part of those three. The first, north of the Rhine in the Basel area, is situated beyond the Jura. The second, on the south in the Mendrisio area, is located in the Po Valley. But these two territories are not extensive in comparison to the total area of the country.

The Swiss Alps occupy the southern part of Switzerland. They were formed by the thrust of the African plate, which also caused the formation of the Jura in the north-east and the plateau between the two massifs. In terms of area the Alps constitute about 60% of the country, the plateau 30% and the Jura 10%.

The rugged terrain of the Jura and the Alps are very sparsely populated, except for some large valleys such as the Valais. Most of the population lives on the plateau where the country's major cities such as Geneva, Zürich, Basel, Lucern, and Bern are located.

=== Central Plateau ===
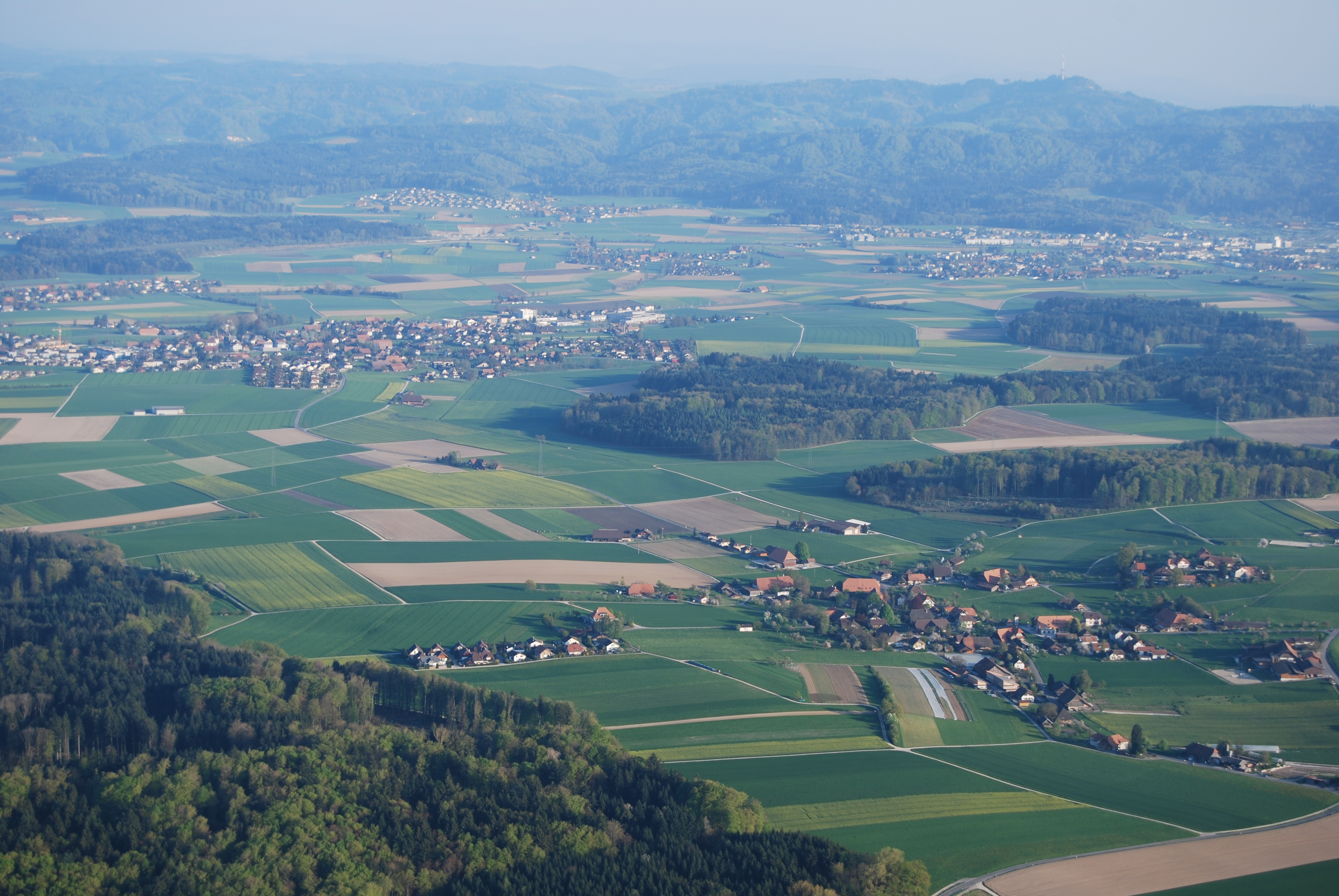
Rolling hills of the Emmental

The Swiss Plateau extends from Lake Geneva on the French border across central Switzerland to Lake Constance on the German and Austrian borders. In the north and northwest, the Swiss Plateau is sharply delimited geographically and geologically by the Jura Mountains. In the south, there is no clear border with the Alps. Usually, the rising of the terrain to altitudes above 1500 metres, which is very abrupt in certain places, is taken as a criterion for delimitation. The plateau has an average altitude of 580 metres (1,900 ft). Even though the Swiss Plateau forms a basin, it is by no means a flat territory and it is covered with rolling hills, lakes and rivers. Most of Switzerland's large lakes are located in the plateau. Both Lake Geneva (581.3 square kilometres (224.4 sq mi)) and Lake Constance (541.1 square kilometres (208.9 sq mi)) are located in the plateau but are shared with other countries. The largest lake totally in Switzerland, Lake Neuchâtel (218.3 square kilometres (84.3 sq mi)), is located in the Swiss Plateau.

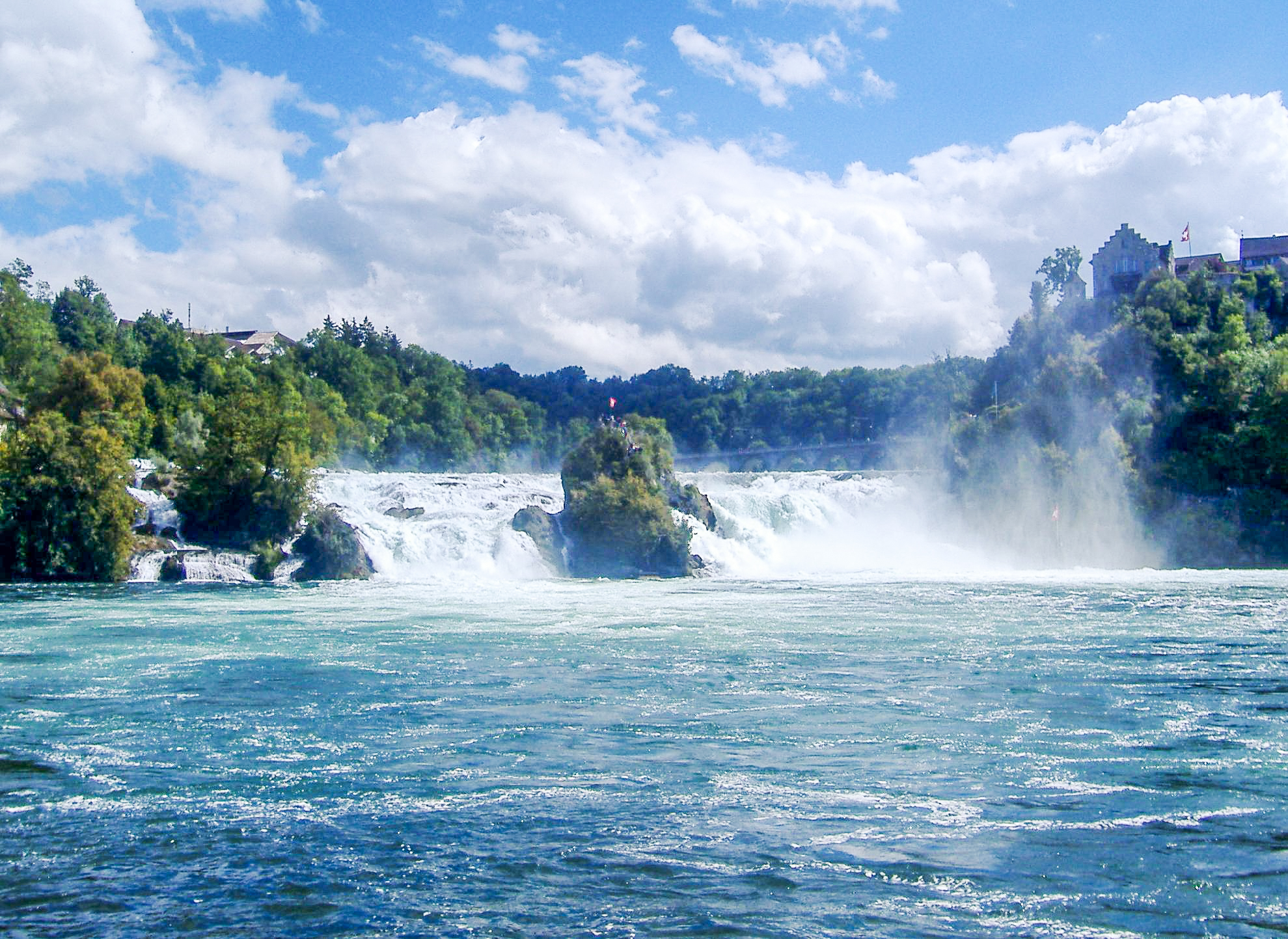
The Rhine Falls (German: Rheinfall) located near Schaffhausen is Europe's largest waterfall.

The Swiss Plateau is crossed by three great river valleys (Rhône, Rhine and Aare) and the smaller Thur valley. While the headwaters of these four rivers all lie in the Alps, they all cut across the plateau between the Alps and the Jura mountains. Near Schaffhausen the Rhine passes through the Rhine Falls, Europe's largest waterfall. The Rhine Falls are 150 metres (490 ft) wide and 25 metres (82 ft) high.

The plateau occupies about one third of the land area of Switzerland, and about two thirds of the population live in this area. The population density on the plateau averages about 450 people per km^{2} (1,166 per square mile). In the regions around Lake Geneva, Lake Zurich and other cities, the population density exceeds 1000 people per km^{2}. As well as the majority of the population, the Swiss Plateau is also home to the majority of industry, manufacturing and farming in Switzerland. The farms are generally small and very organized. Most farms include small meadows alternating with fields with a variety of crops and small wooded areas.

=== Alps ===
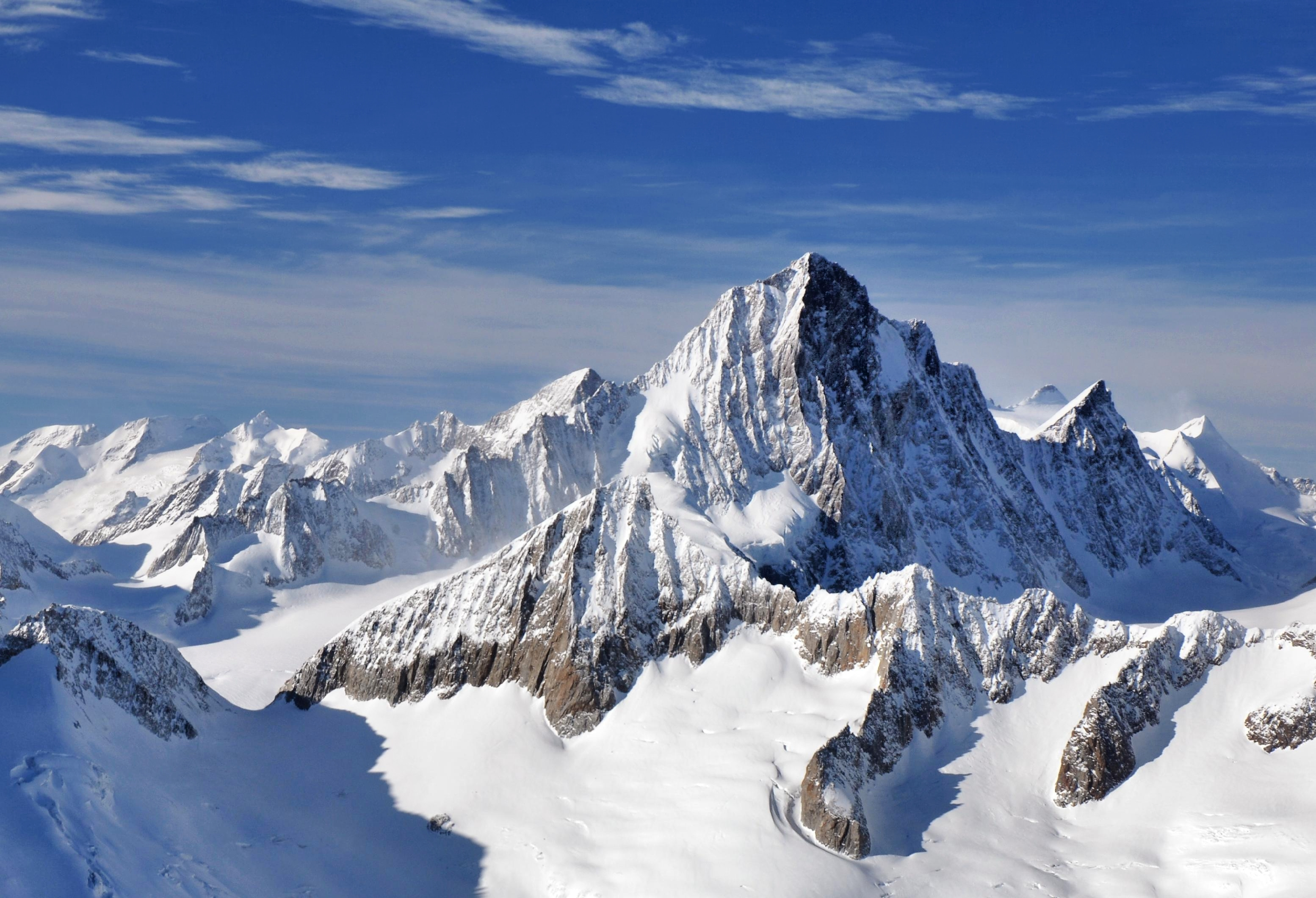
Culminating at the Finsteraarhorn, the great northern range constitutes an important climatic barrier

The Swiss Alps form part of a chain of mountains that stretch across southern Europe and isolate Northern Europe from the Mediterranean Sea. Several important passes through the Alps are located in Switzerland, and control of the passes has been important throughout Switzerland's history. The Alps have an average altitude of 1,700 metres (5,600 ft) and cover nearly two thirds of the total surface area. Within the Alps there are 48 mountains that are 4,000 metres (13,000 ft) or higher.

The Alps are the watershed of Western Europe. The Rhine, together with its tributaries the Aare and the Thur drain about two thirds of the water into the North Sea. The Rhône and the Ticino drain about 18% of the water into the Mediterranean Sea. The Inn which flows into the Danube outside of Switzerland drains about 4.4% of the water into the Black Sea. The Swiss Alps also contain many of Central Europe's glaciers. There are about 1,800 glaciers which cover 1,200 square kilometres (460 sq mi) of the total glaciated area of the Alps.

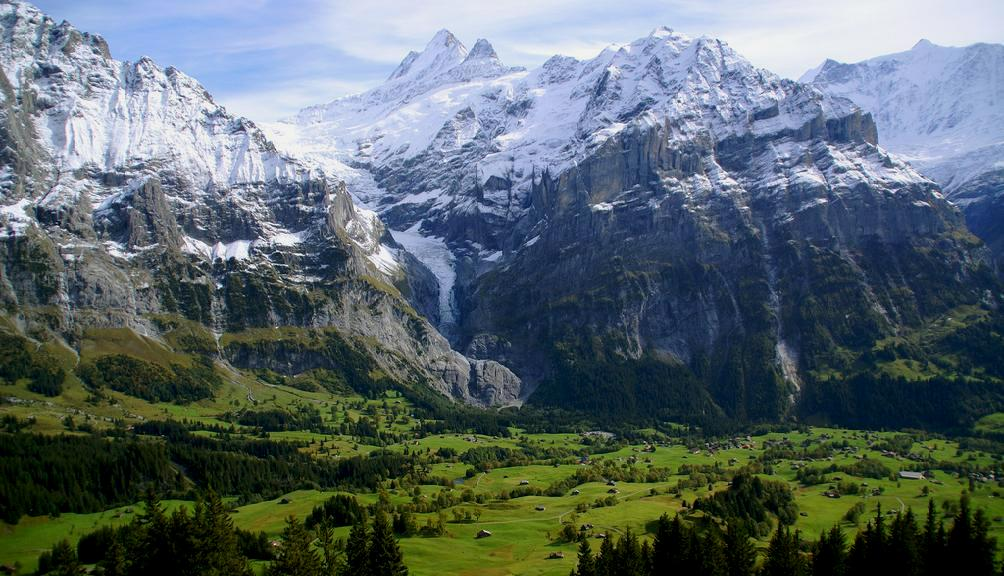
Bernese Alps in Grindelwald

The Alps are a popular tourist destination and are one of the most recognizable symbols of Switzerland. The tallest point in Switzerland, Monte Rosa (4,634 metres (15,203 ft)) in the canton of Valais, is located in the Alps, and so is the tallest mountain wholly in Switzerland, the Dom (4,545 metres (14,911 ft)). One of the most recognizable symbols of Switzerland, the Matterhorn, is also located in the Alps. The Matterhorn (4,478 metres (14,692 ft)) is the seventh highest peak in the Swiss Alps and is the most photographed mountain in Switzerland. The tallest mountain in the northern outlier or Bernese Alps is the Finsteraarhorn (4,274 metres (14,022 ft)).

Switzerland encompasses a significant portion of the south side of the Alps. Most of it is constituted by the canton of Ticino, almost reaching the plains of the Po and including Switzerland's lowest point on Lake Maggiore (193 metres (633 ft)). The canton of Graubünden is also partially located on the south side of the Alps with the four valleys of Misox, Bregaglia, Poschiavo and Müstair. Finally, the canton of Valais comprises the upper Diveria valley, located south of the Simplon Pass.

=== Jura ===
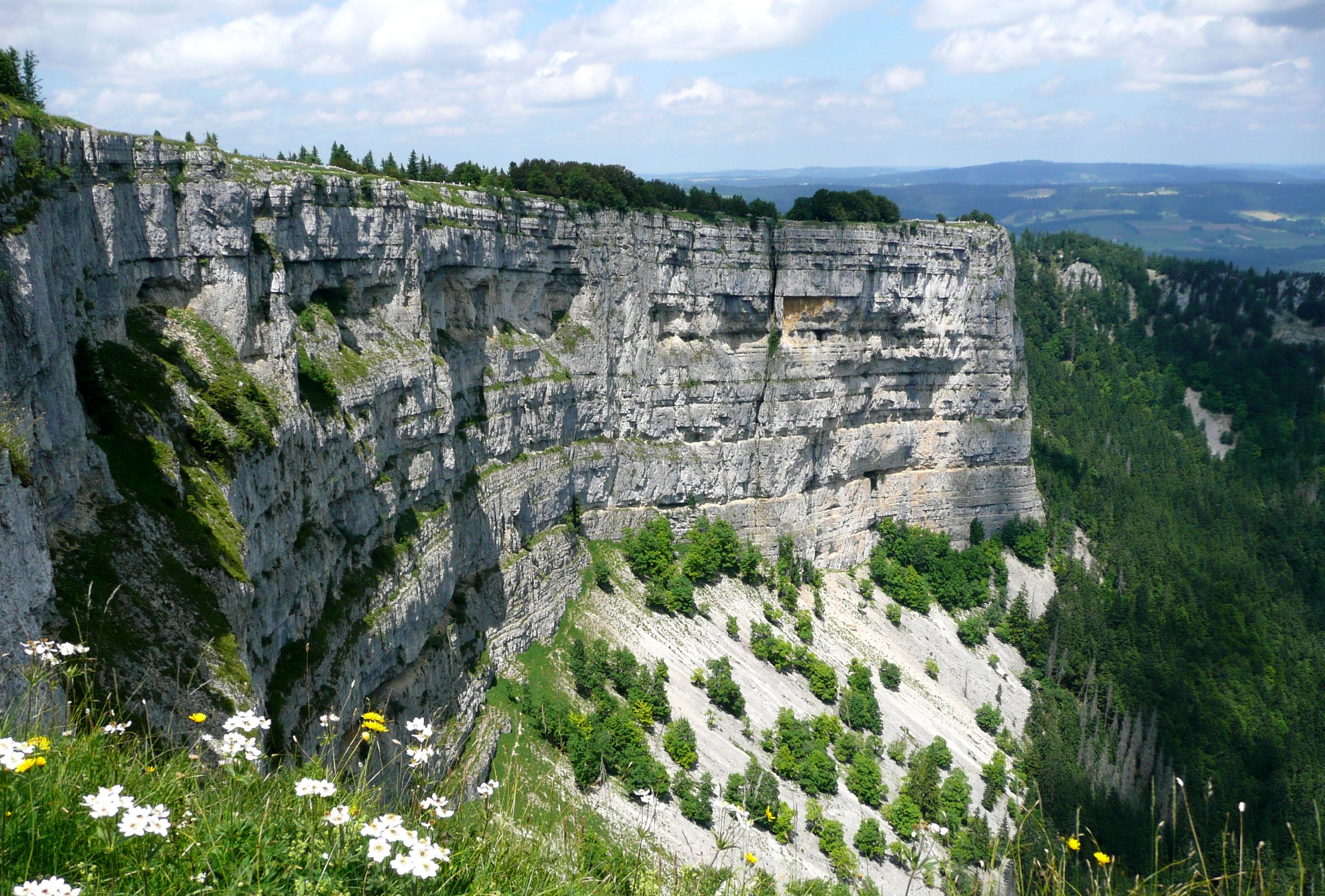
Creux du Van in canton of Neuchatel showing the limestone layers visible in the Jura Mountains

The Jura (or "folded Jura") is a limestone mountain range running from Lake Geneva to the Rhine river, continuing north-eastwards as the Table Jura (including the Randen). This area makes up about 12% of Switzerland's land area. Located about 700 metres (2,300 ft) above sea level, this region is characterized by a limestone highland with deep river valleys.

The limestone rock in the Jura is a Jurassic period rock with numerous fossils and dinosaur tracks. The name Jurassic actually refers to the Jura region where these fossils were studied at the end of the 18th century. The Jura is considered one of the most important sites for dinosaur footprints in the world. In one area near the village of Courtedoux, over 13,000 footprints were discovered in between 2002 and 2011.

The range is being continually built up and decreasing in width by mountain building, accommodating the compression from alpine folding as the main Alpine orogenic front moves roughly northwards. The deformation becomes less pervasive away from the younger, more active Alpine mountain building.

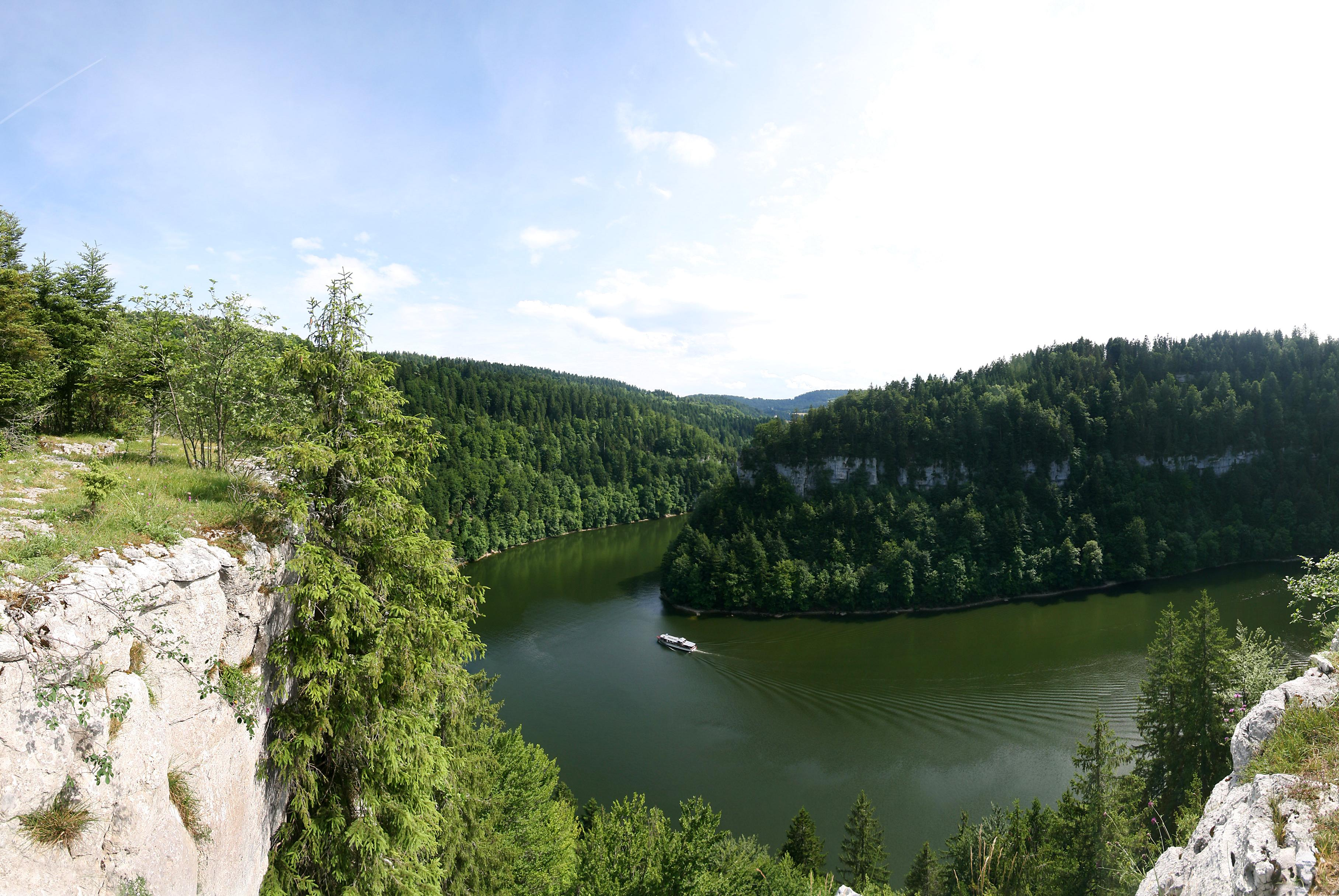
The Doubs, marking the border with France

Structurally, the Jura consists of a sequence of folds, the formation of which is facilitated by an evaporitic decollement layer. The box folds are still relatively young, evidenced by their defining the shape of the overlying landscape (meaning they have not existed long enough to experience erosion). The folds comprise three major (lithological units) bands of building evidence dated roughly by era: the Malm, Dogger, and Lias (part of the Jurassic Geologic period). Each era of folding represents effects on a previously shallow marine environment as evidenced by beds with particular carbonate sequences, containing abundant bioclasts and oolitic divisions between layers (called horizons).

The Jura Mountains rise in Swiss territory to a height of 1,679 metres (5,509 ft) at Mont Tendre. Other high summits are La Dôle (1,677 metres (5,502 ft)), the Chasseron (1,607 metres (5,272 ft)) and the Chasseral (1,607 metres (5,272 ft)), all located in the western part of the range, in the cantons of Vaud, Neuchâtel and Bern.

== Hydrology ==
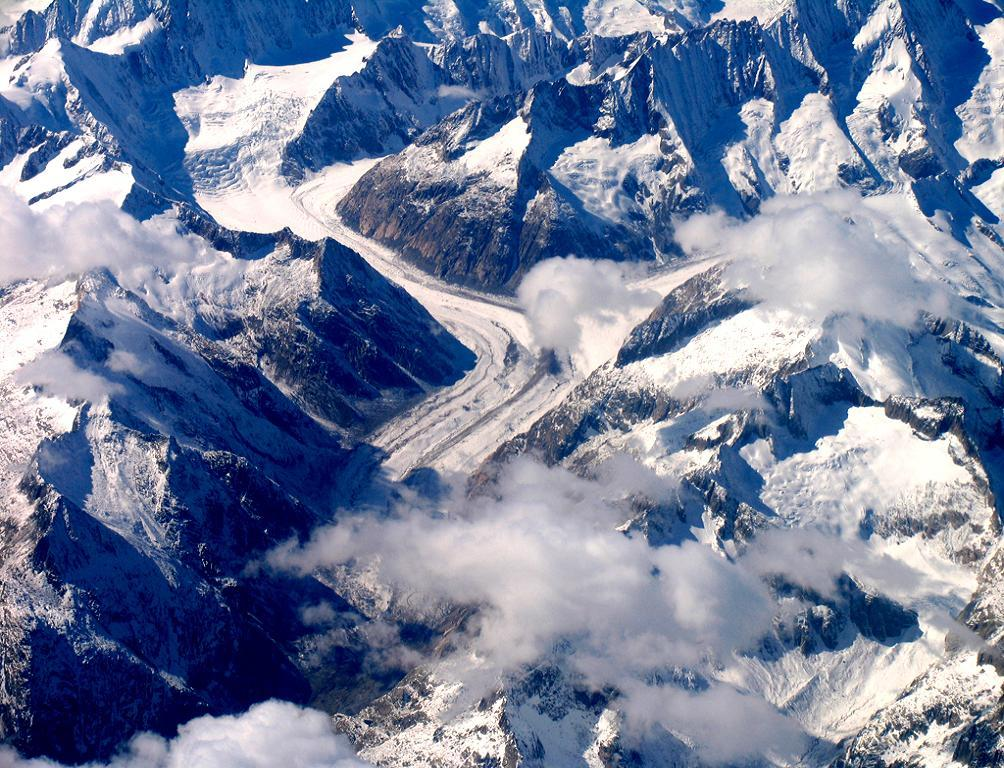
Many rivers, such as the Aare, take their source from the Alpine glaciers.

Often referred to as the water tower of Europe, Switzerland has 6% of all freshwater reserves of the continent, while only accounting for 0.4% of its total area. The country shares five river basins and some of the largest lakes in western Europe with its neighbours. It is the source of several major European rivers that ultimately flow into the North Sea (Rhine), into the Mediterranean Sea (Rhône), into the Black Sea (Inn, through the Danube) and into the Adriatic Sea (Ticino, through the Po and Rom through the Adige).

Most of the great Swiss rivers, being in their origin mere mountain torrents, tend to overflow their banks. Much has been done to prevent this by embanking them, regaining arable land: the Rhine (between Bad Ragaz and Lake Constance), the Rhône, the Aare, the Reuss and in particular the great works on the Linth (carried out 1807–1810 by Hans Conrad Escher, earning him the surname of "Von der Linth") and the Zihl near the lakes of Neuchâtel and Biel, while the diversion of the Kander from its junction with the Aare to a channel by which it flows into Lake Thun was effected as early as 1714.

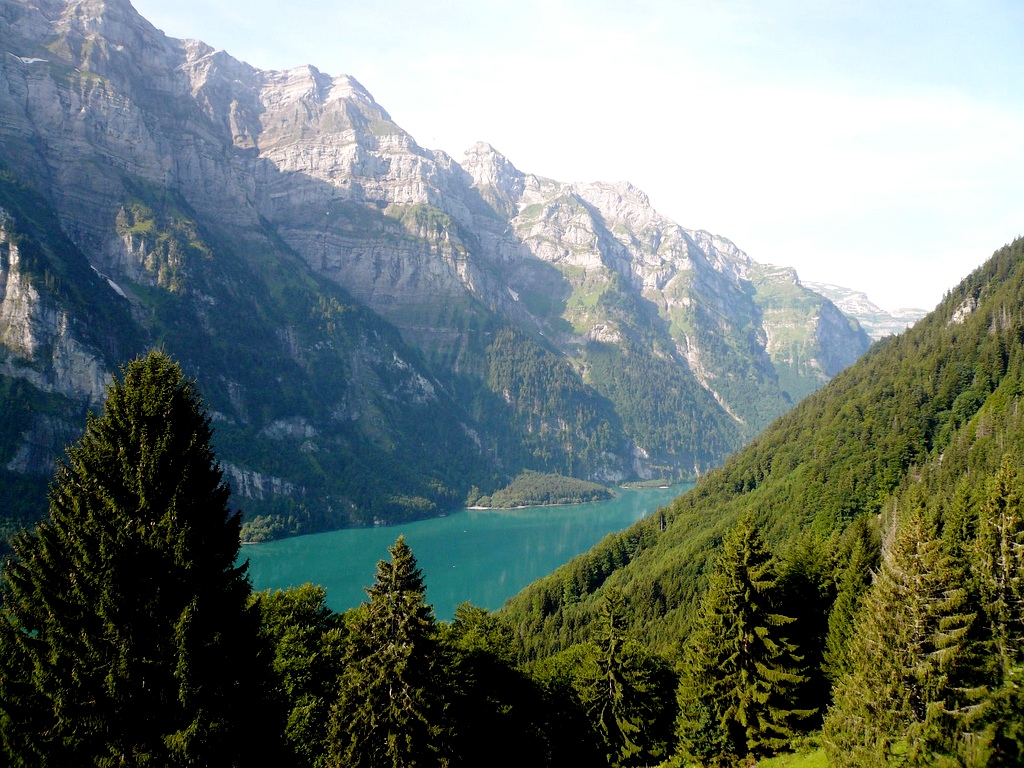
The Klöntalersee, one of the numerous Alpine lakes of Switzerland

Switzerland has considerable reserves of groundwater and a large number of lakes, large and small, can be found in most areas. The two most extensive, those of Geneva and of Constance, balance each other, as it were, at the south-west and north-east corners of the land. But neither of these is wholly Swiss, this distinction being claimed by the next in size, that of Neuchâtel, Lake Maggiore (partly Swiss only) coming next in the list, and being followed by the wholly Swiss lakes of Lucerne and of Zurich. Then come Lake Lugano, Lake Thun, Lake Biel, Lake Zug, Lake Brienz, Lake Walenstadt and Lake Murten. These thirteen only are over 20 km^{2} (7.7 mi^{2}) in extent. Ten of them are in the Rhine basin (also in that of the Aare), two (Maggiore and Lugano) in that of the Po, and one (Geneva) in that of the Rhône. There are no large lakes in the Swiss portion of the Inn basin, the most extensive being that of Sils. Smaller Alpine lakes such as the Oeschinensee are innumerable, and often constitute popular tourist destinations. Since the twentieth century a large number of dams have been built in the Alps and elsewhere, resulting in many artificial lakes. The largest are the Sihlsee and the Lake of Gruyère both approximately 10 km^{2} (3.9 mi^{2}) in extent. Also notable is Lac des Dix, withheld by the Grande Dixence, the tallest gravity dam in the world.

In total, lakes and reservoirs contain 50% of the stored water, glaciers 28%, groundwater 20% and rivers 2%.

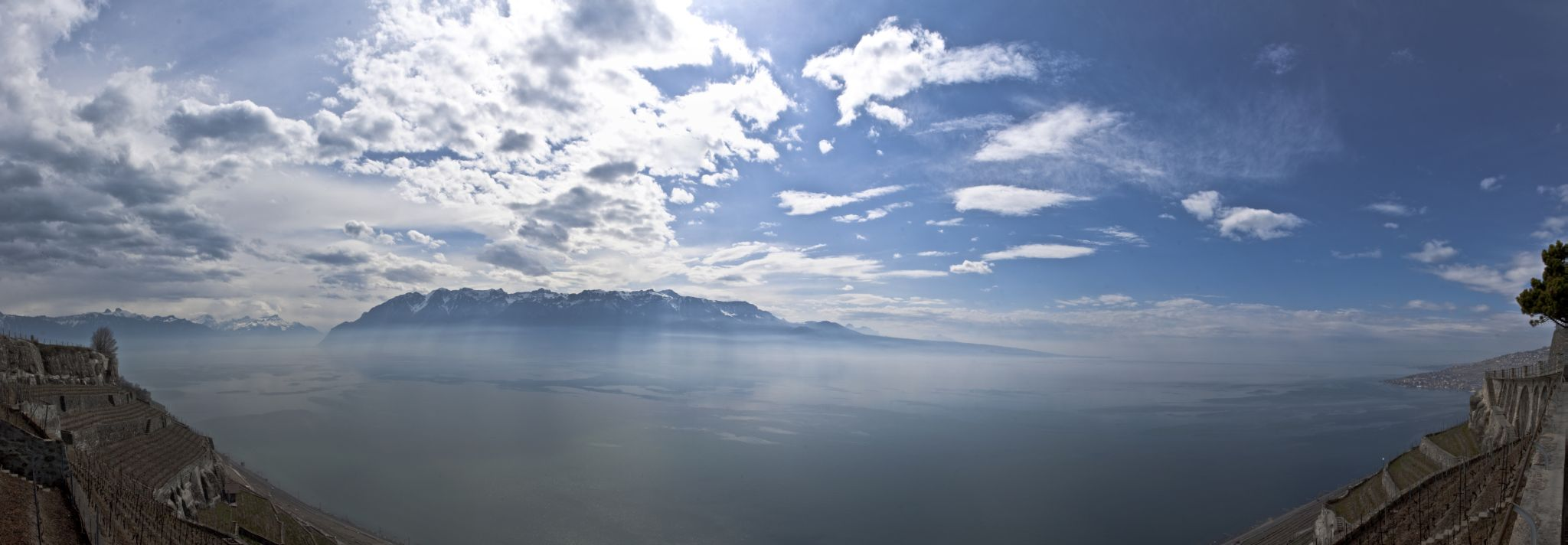
View of Lake Geneva from the vineyards between Montreux and Lausanne

== Climate ==
Köppen climate classification types of Switzerland

The geography of Switzerland encompasses a wide range of climates, from subtropical to perennial snow climate. However, the lowlands are part of the temperate zone and typically experience neither extreme temperatures nor extreme weather conditions. In the Köppen climate classification, the Swiss Plateau and most low-elevation areas are at the transition between oceanic climate (Cfb) and continental climate (Dfb). As a consequence, all four seasons (spring, summer, autumn and winter) are well marked and present distinct weather conditions. At the same time, the influence of the nearby seas (especially the Atlantic Ocean) tends to prevent extreme temperatures in summer and winter, with changeable, often overcast weather. The Alps, and in a minor way the Jura Mountains, have a considerable impact on the Swiss climate. They influence it both on a horizontal level, by compartmentalizing it into distinct areas, and on a vertical level, by stratificating it into distinct layers. As a result, four other Köppen climate types are also found in Switzerland: humid subtropical climate (Cfa), subarctic climate (Dfc), tundra climate (ET) and ice cap climate (EF).

At lower altitudes, the weather is generally moderate. On the Plateau, freezing temperatures generally occur during December to early March with an average temperature of 9 °C (48.2 °F) for elevations between 400–600 metres (1,312–1,969 ft). On the Plateau, the average precipitation is 1,000 millimetres (39 in) with a range of about 800–1,300 millimetres (31.5–51.2 in). Ticino, on the south side of the Alps, is usually 2–4 °C (3.6–7.2 °F) warmer, and wetter than the Plateau, with often different weather conditions, which are particularly noticeable when crossing the Gotthard or other major tunnels through the Alps.

Horizontally, the low-elevation regions having a distinct climate are essentially the Plateau (north of the Alps), southern Switzerland (south of the Alps) and the inner valleys (neither really north of south of the Alps but well within them). To those can be added the northerly regions of Ajoie, both cantons of Basel (canton of Basel-City and canton of Basel-Country) and canton of Schaffhausen (well beyond the Jura Mountains), which are comparable to the Plateau. In those regions, the lowest averages temperatures can be found on the Plateau (Bern: 8.8 °C (47.8 °F)) or north of the Jura Mountains (Fahy: 8.9 °C (48.0 °F)). On the other hand, the highest average temperatures are found south of the Alps (Locarno: 12.4 °C (54.3 °F), Lugano: 12.4 °C (54.3 °F)), which are partially subtropical. The precipitation levels are also deeply affected by the Alps, with the highest rainfalls being experienced south of the Alps (Locarno: 1,897 millimetres (74.7 in), Lugano: 1,559 millimetres (61.4 in)). In general, the proximity to the Alpine foothills increases the precipitations (Interlaken 1,196 millimetres (47.1 in)), Lucerne: 1,173 millimetres (46.2 in)), while places further away from the Alps experience less precipitation (Basel: 842 millimetres (33.1 in)). The driest regions of the country are, however, deep within the Alps (the inner valleys), particularly in Valais (Sion: 603 millimetres (23.7 in)), which is often described as "semi-arid", but also in Graubünden (Chur: 849 millimetres (33.4 in)). Precipitation levels do not always negatively correlate with sunshine hours. While Locarno is one of the wettest low-elevation locations in the country, it is also the one with the most sunshine hours (2,171). In comparison, the drier locations on the Plateau experience much less sunshine hours (Lucerne: 1,570, Zürich: 1,544). Being sheltered by the mountains, the regions well within the Alps also naturally experience more sunshine hours than the north side of the Alps (Sion: 2,093, Chur: 1,692).

The widest range of climates in Switzerland is spread vertically. As the elevation above sea-level ranges from 193 to 4,634 metres (633 to 15,203 ft), many ecosystems are naturally found, from the regions of olives, vines, oaks and beeches, pines and firs, to those of the high mountain pastures, rhododendrons, and of eternal snow. In general, rainfall increase with elevation, while temperature decrease with it. Just above the plains and the foothills zone, at roughly 800 metres (3,000 ft), is the montane zone, which still encompasses numerous inhabited regions of the Alps and Jura Mountains. In the montane zone, which comprehends a large diversity of ecosystems, coniferous trees and snowfall progressively replace deciduous tree and rainfall. At roughly 2,000 metres (7,000 ft) is the tree line, which marks the beginning of the Alpine zone. The latter marks the end of the inhabited regions as well, with a few exceptions, such as Juf. The final layer lies above 3,000 metres (10,000 ft). It is the snow zone (ice cap climate). It only concerns the high Alps, notably the Bernese Alps and Pennine Alps. The coldest meteorological station is at the Jungfraujoch, and overlook one of Europe's largest glaciers. The Jura and Alpine foothills have more precipitation than the plains, with an average of 1,200–1,600 millimetres (47.2–63.0 in), while the high Alps may have over 3,000 millimetres (118.1 in).

While the highest temperature ever recorded in Switzerland was 41.5 °C (106.7 °F) in August 2003 in Grono, the lowest officially recorded was −41.8 °C (−43.2 °F) in January 1987 in La Brévine. Lower temperatures have also been registered, independently from the Federal Office of Meteorology and Climatology, for instance at Glattalpsee.

Climate change has been affecting Switzerland's glaciers. After the long, hot European summer of 2026, in which Switzerland had its hottest summer since records began, scientists have found glaciers melting at an unprecedented rate.

Climatic diversity (period between 1981 and 2010)
Place	Altitude of meteorological station (m)	Average rainfall (mm per year)	Average sunshine in August (%)	Average sunshine in December (%)	Average maximum temperature in July (°C)	Average minimum temperature in January (°C)	Illustration
Jungfraujoch (Alps)	3571	>3000	49	48	+3.1	-15.7	The Sphinx and the Jungfraujoch. Note the prevalence of ice and snow and the absence of vegetation.
Säntis (Alps)	2501	2837	40	44	+8.8	-9.6	Below the summit of Säntis. Note the almost barren landscape with some patches of tundra and snow.
Arosa (Alps)	1878	1365	51	48	+15.4	-7.0	Untersee in Arosa. Note the prevalence of coniferous forests and the presence of dwarf trees, indicating the proximity of the tree line.
La Chaux-de-Fonds (Jura Mountains)	1017	1441	50	35	+20.7	-6.0	Maison Blanche in La Chaux-de-Fonds. Note the mixed coniferous-deciduous forest in background.
Bern (Swiss Plateau)	553	1059	54	20	+24.3	-3.6	Aare river in Bern. Note the prevalence of deciduous trees.
Sion (Inner valleys)	482	603	64	50	+27.0	-3.6	Valère Basilica hill in Sion. Note the prevalence of steppic vegetation in the foreground and vineyards in the background.
Locarno (Southern Switzerland)	367	1897	62	57	+27.1	+0.8	Locarno from Monti Trinità. Note the presence of palm trees in the foreground and the brown mountains in the background, showing the prevalence of deciduous trees (before foliation) at even high elevations.

== Political divisions and greater regions ==
As a federal state, Switzerland is composed of 26 cantons, which are further divided into districts and municipalities. Each canton was a fully sovereign state with its own borders, army and currency from the Treaty of Westphalia (1648) until the establishment of the Swiss federal state in 1848. There are considerable differences between the individual cantons, most particularly in terms of population and geographical area; hence seven larger and more homogeneous regions have been defined. They do not, however, constitute administrative units and are mostly used for statistical and economic purposes.

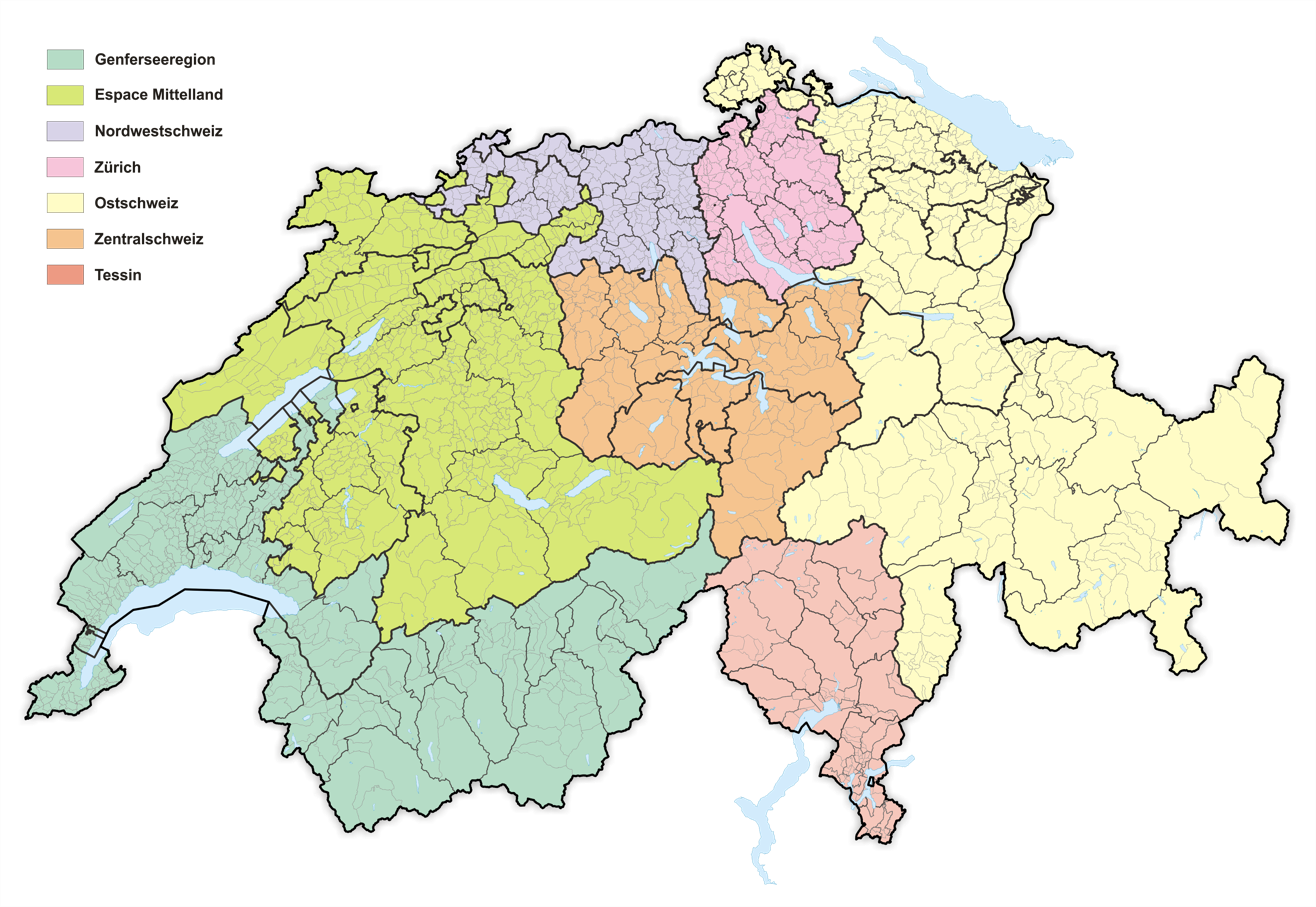

Regions	Cantons of	Regions	Cantons of
Northwestern; Switzerland	Aargau	Central; Switzerland	Lucerne
Northwestern; Switzerland	Basel-Landschaft	Central; Switzerland	Nidwalden
Northwestern; Switzerland	Basel-Stadt	Central; Switzerland	Obwalden
Espace; Mittelland	Bern	Central; Switzerland	Schwyz
Espace; Mittelland	Fribourg	Central; Switzerland	Uri
Espace; Mittelland	Jura	Central; Switzerland	Zug
Espace; Mittelland	Neuchâtel	Eastern; Switzerland	Appenzell Ausserrhoden
Espace; Mittelland	Solothurn	Eastern; Switzerland	Appenzell Innerrhoden
Lake Geneva	Geneva	Eastern; Switzerland	Glarus
Lake Geneva	Valais	Eastern; Switzerland	Graubünden
Lake Geneva	Vaud	Eastern; Switzerland	Schaffhausen
Zürich	Zürich	Eastern; Switzerland	St. Gallen
Ticino	Ticino	Eastern; Switzerland	Thurgau

== Land use ==
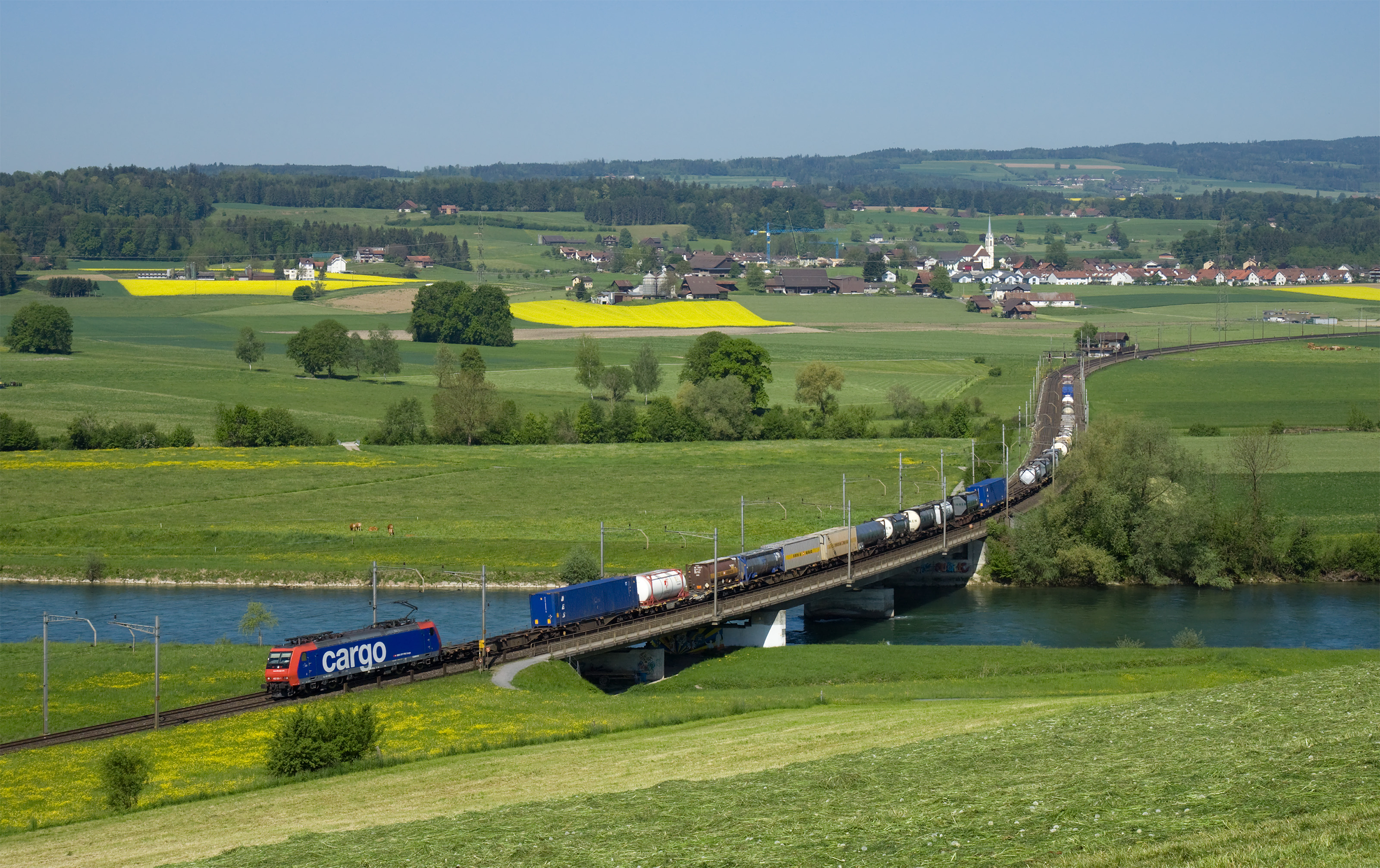
Land use Source: FSO (1992–1997)
Main areas	Surface (in %)	Land use	Surface (in ha)
Surfaces of housing and infrastructure	6.8	Building areas	137,564
Surfaces of housing and infrastructure	6.8	Industrial areas	20,233
Surfaces of housing and infrastructure	6.8	Special infrastructure areas	16,111
Surfaces of housing and infrastructure	6.8	Green spaces and recreation areas	15,860
Surfaces of housing and infrastructure	6.8	Transportation areas	89,329
Agricultural land	36.9	Orchards, vineyards, horticulture	60,956
Agricultural land	36.9	Arable land, local pastures	926,378
Agricultural land	36.9	Alpine pastures	537,802
Forests	30.8	Forest	1,102,160
Forests	30.8	Scrub forests	60,514
Forests	30.8	Other woodlands	108,978
Unproductive areas	25.5	Lakes	142,234
Unproductive areas	25.5	Rivers	31,724
Unproductive areas	25.5	Unproductive vegetation	263,051
Unproductive areas	25.5	Unvegetated surfaces	615,597

The Swiss territory is divided into four major types of land use. As of 2001, 36.9% of the land in Switzerland was used for farming. 30.8% of the country is covered with forests and woodlands, with an additional 6.8% covered with houses or buildings. About one-fourth (25.5%) of the country is either mountains, lakes or rivers and is categorised as unproductive.

=== Surfaces of housing and infrastructure ===
The habitat is mainly developed in the Swiss Plateau and the northern slopes of the Alps, near lakes and along major rivers. It occupies 14.6% of the Plateau, the Jura (7.4%), the southern (4.3%) and the northern Alps (4%), and finally the western central Alps (2.9%) and Eastern Alps (1.6%).

Habitat areas and infrastructure grow around the urban areas but also in the countryside, at the expense of agricultural land. This growth (called suburbanization) is particularly pronounced along the main transport routes such as motorways and railways. New roads lead to a significant increase in construction activity in the affected regions. Many people who work in the city prefer to live in the countryside to take advantage of cheaper land and better quality of life. This is also reflected in the construction statistics: single-family homes arise mainly in rural areas, multi-family homes in the cities. Household structures are also evolving and tend to become smaller. In twelve years, the area devoted to housing increased by 25% while the increase of the population was only 9%.

=== Farmland ===
Although it is declining, agriculture represents the most important use of the territory in Switzerland. Farmlands dominates the Plateau, occupying just over half of the area. The situation is similar in the Jura (44%), on the northern slopes of the Alps (38.2%) and in the eastern Central Alps (31.4%). In the mountainous regions of the western Central Alps (Valais) and in the south, the agricultural areas (mostly pastures) are proportionately lower.

In 1993 it was estimated that 250 square kilometres (97 sq mi) (or about 0.6%) of the entire country was irrigated meaning that most Swiss farms receive enough rainfall to grow.

The protection of forested areas led to numerous conflicts of interests around the farmland, especially on the Plateau and near urban areas where the habitat area development and infrastructure tend to reduce the amount of arable land. Conversely, the number of farms in the mountains tend to decrease, many areas are left for the benefit of woodlands to the detriment of landscape diversity. This decline is particularly marked in Valais and Ticino.

=== Forests ===
Forests cover less than a third of the territory, but the area is increasing year by year. The reforestation is essentially natural, mainly in the Alps where the forest areas reoccupy those abandoned by farmers. Afforestation contributes 13% to reforestation, and is conducted for compensation following a clearance or to provide protection against natural hazards in the mountainous areas (avalanches, landslides). Forests are more predominant in the Jura and in the southern Alps, occupying respectively 47.7% and 47.2% of the soil in these regions. On the northern slopes of the Alps, Alpine forest occupy 33.2% and on the Plateau 24.6%. It is in the Central Alps that forest areas occupy less floor with about 22% coverage.

Switzerland is home to mixed maple-ash forests of fertile and deep earth that collects at the base of slopes. They replace the moist oak-hornbeam forests in areas with higher rainfall. This type of forest has been called "one of the most productive in Switzerland" and the tree growth has been described as "aggressive". It takes one third of the time for trees to reach the same height as it would in a mull-beech forest and within 100 years trees in maple-ash forests can reach a height of 35m, though the quality of wood will not be as high. The rich undergrowth of these forests is dominated by the allium ursinum (wild garlic) common throughout Western Europe.

=== Unproductive areas ===
The unproductive areas correspond to all areas occupied by rocks, boulders, ice, snow fields and unproductive vegetation beyond the limits of forests. Lakes, rivers and wetlands are also unproductive areas. Occupying 25.5% of Swiss soil, these surfaces are in very slight decline (-0.1% over 10 years). They are predominant in the Central Alps (half of the soil), on the contrary they only cover 10% of the surface of the plateau and 1% of the Swiss Jura. The uncultivated mountain areas are exploited by the tourism and the production of hydroelectricity. Climatic conditions strongly affect the landscape of these areas: water seepage, landslides, avalanches, torrents in spate. Man intervenes on 0.2% of this surface area to create infrastructure protecting against floods or avalanches. The channels of communication, with many works of art occupy a portion of these surfaces.

In the plains, lakes and streams near areas of habitat are used for recreation and relaxation. Habitats, damp or dry, and nature reserves are managed and these areas contribute to maintain biodiversity.

== Population ==
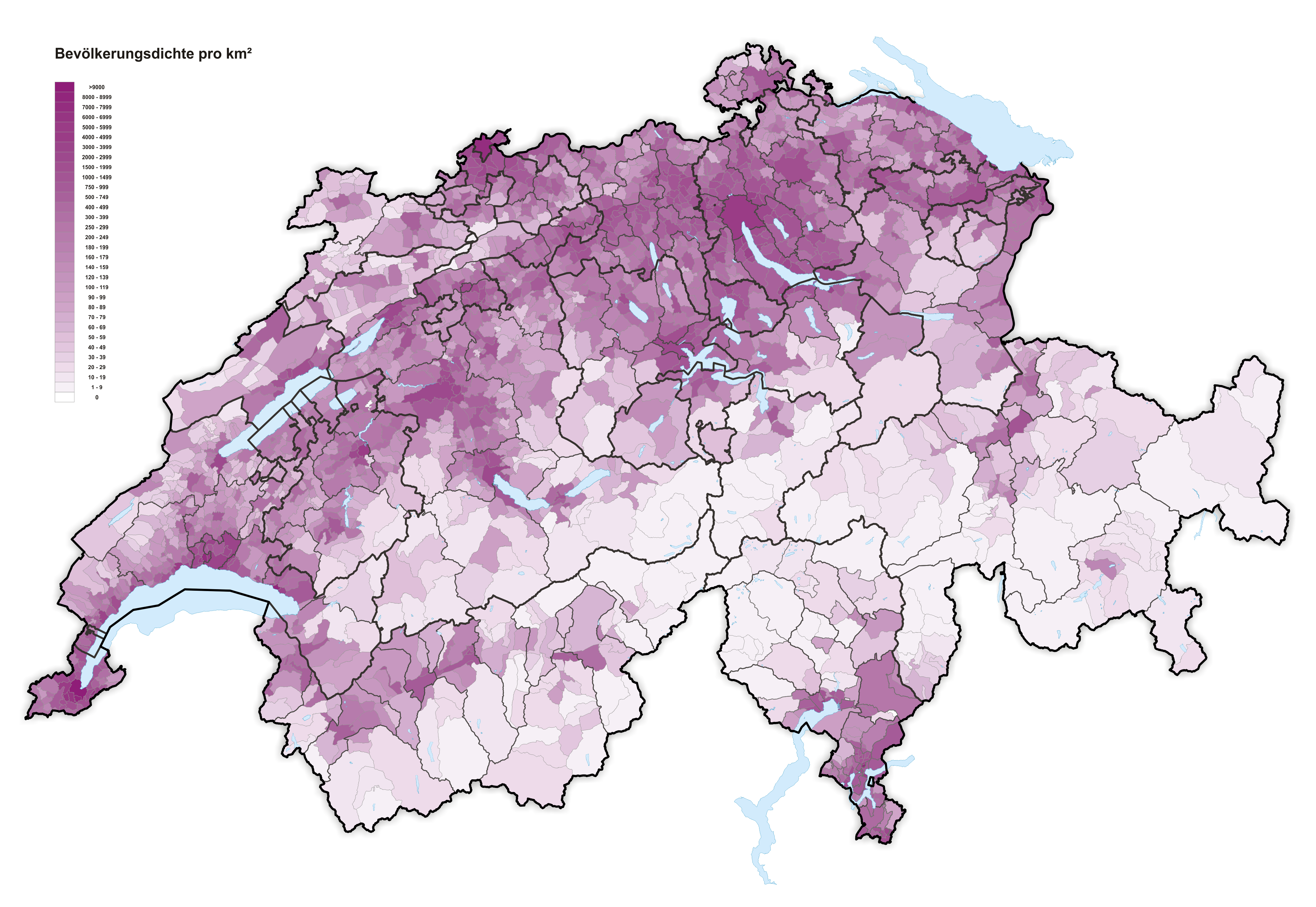
Density of population by municipality (2019)

The population of Switzerland is heavily urbanised. In 2009, 74% of the 7,785,800 inhabitants lived in urban areas. The distribution of population is shaped by the topography of the country, the plateau being the most populous area and including the major cities of Switzerland. With a population density of 450 inhabitants per km^{2}, it is one of the most densely populated region in Europe. There are large disparities of population densities between the cantons lying in the plateau and those lying in the Alps. Thus, the population densities of the cantons of Lucerne, Solothurn and Zürich are respectively 261.0, 319.7 and 813.6 inhabitants per km^{2}. On the other hand, the cantons of Uri and Graubünden have very low population densities, respectively 33.4 and 27.0 inhabitants per km^{2}. In the southern Alps, the canton of Ticino also has a population density less than the national average, with 122.5 inhabitants per km^{2} (against 194.7).

== Environment ==
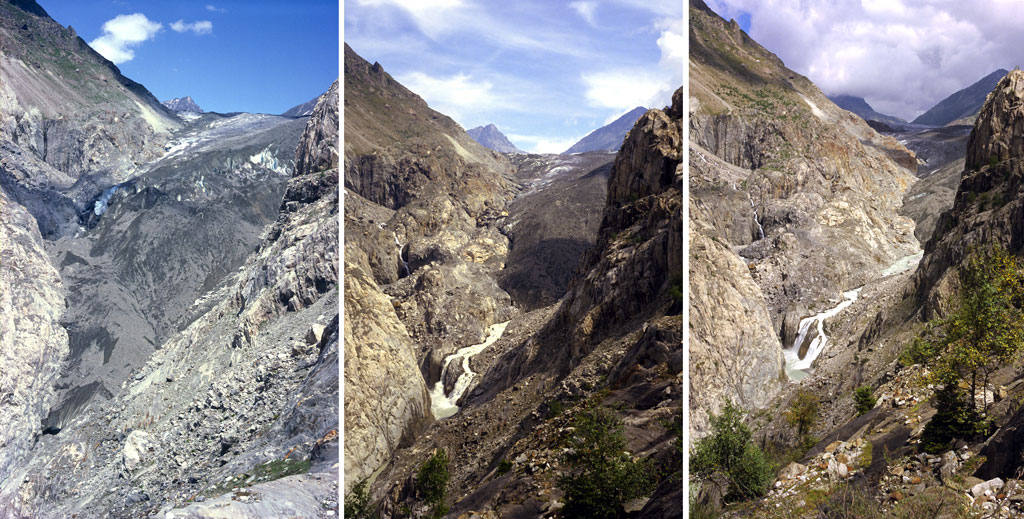
The retreat of Aletsch Glacier (situation in 1979, 1991 and 2002), due to global warming

With the delicate alpine and glacial environments making up a significant portion of the country and providing a major industry, Switzerland has been concerned with environmental issues. Some of the main issues are listed below.

=== Air ===
The main environmental issues in Switzerland's air is air pollution from vehicle emissions and open-air burning as well as acid rain. In 2004, the average amount of carbon dioxide (CO_{2}) emissions per resident was 6 tonnes (6.6 short tons; 5.9 long tons) and in 2005 was 6.2 tonnes (6.8 short tons; 6.1 long tons). With these numbers, Switzerland is 31st to 33rd among the 45 nations listed by United Nations Millennium Development Goals Indicators as developed nations and 69th worldwide. In 2009 Switzerland announced that they expected by 2010 to reduce their total greenhouse gas emissions by 8% to 10% over emissions in 1990.

The population (as of 2005) uses 3.76 tonnes of oil equivalent per person per year, of which 43.7% comes from petroleum and 19% from nuclear power.

=== Water ===
The major water issue in Switzerland is water pollution from the increased use of agricultural fertilizers as well as hydrocarbon pollution from transport and industry. While improvements have been made, there are still issues with eutrophication (an increase in nitrogen and phosphates) in many lakes in the Swiss Plateau.

The total renewable water resources of Switzerland, as of 2005, totals 53.3 km^{3} (1.17×10^{13} imp gal; 1.41×10^{13} US gal), of which the total freshwater withdrawal is 2.5 km^{3} (5.5×10^{11} imp gal; 6.6×10^{11} US gal) per year. This breaks down to a per capita freshwater withdrawal of 348 m^{3} (77,000 imp gal; 92,000 US gal) per year. Of that water (as of 2002), 24% is used in households, 74% in industry and only 2% is used for agriculture.

In Switzerland, there are officially 38,000 polluted sites, 4,000 of which represent a real threat to groundwater.

=== Biodiversity ===
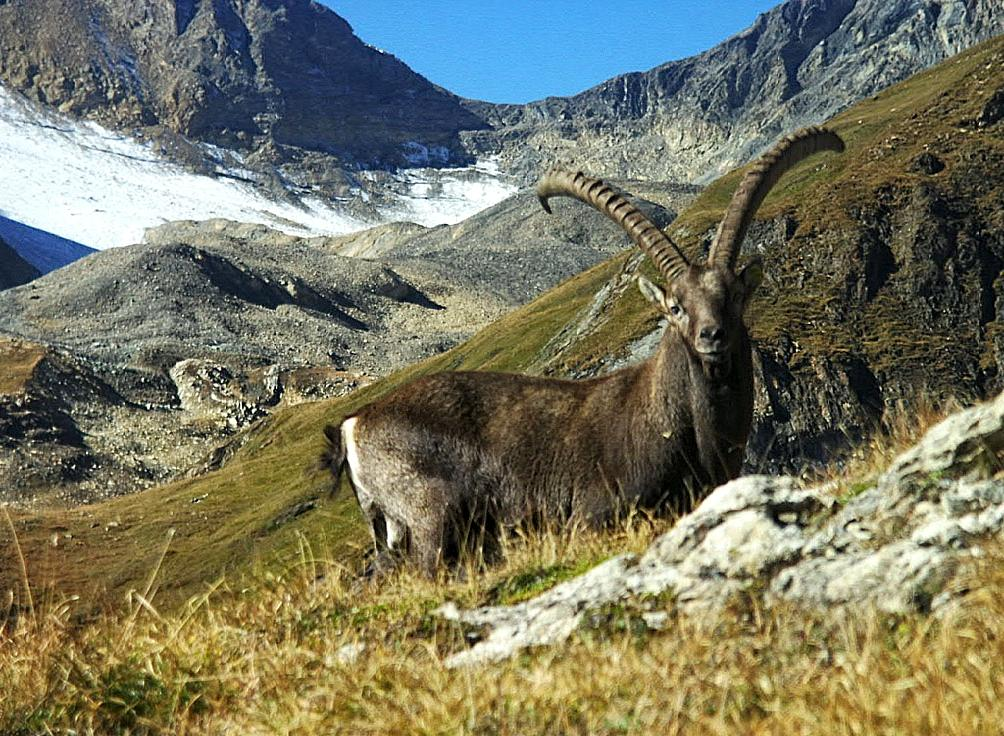
An alpine ibex in the Lötschental

Switzerland is facing a loss of biodiversity. While the country is quite small, the wide range of climates allow a variety of organisms to flourish. There are about 50,000 animal and plant species living in Switzerland. While most species that live on north and south foothills of the Alps are generally doing well, the Swiss Plateau is seeing a decrease in many species. The pressure from city and agricultural growth is reducing or eliminating the habitat of many species that once flourished along the plateau. There are about 60 species that are considered endangered that live in Switzerland. To help offset this, 28.6% of the country is set aside as a protected natural area. In 2001, the Federal Office for the Environment FOEN launched a nationwide programme to systematically monitor biodiversity (Biodiversity Monitoring Switzerland).

=== International agreements ===
Party to:

- Air Pollution
- Air Pollution-Nitrogen Oxides
- Air Pollution-Sulphur 85, Air Pollution-Sulphur 94
- Air Pollution-Volatile Organic Compounds
- Air Pollution-Persistent Organic Pollutants
- Antarctic Treaty
- Antarctic-Environmental Protocol
- Biodiversity
- Climate Change
- Climate Change-Kyoto Protocol
- Desertification
- Endangered Species
- Environmental Modification
- Hazardous Wastes
- Law of the Sea
- Marine Dumping
- Marine Life Conservation
- Nuclear Test Ban
- Ozone Layer Protection
- Ship Pollution
- Tropical Timber 83
- Tropical Timber 94
- Wetlands
- Whaling

== Area and borders ==
The borders of Switzerland were established by the original formation of the Helvetic Republic in 1798, the accession thereto of Valais and Grisons and the incorporation of various remaining feudal territories such as the County of Neuchâtel, Prince-Bishopric of Basel and Abbey of St. Gall. The cantons largely have had their current borders since 1815 (at the accession of canton of Valais, canton of Neuchâtel and canton of Geneva), except for the notable change when Jura seceded from Berne in 1979. The total length of the border is 1,899 km, enclosing an area of 41,290 km^{2} (15,940 sq mi) (land: 39,770 km^{2} (15,360 sq mi), water: 1,520 km^{2} (590 sq mi)).

Border	km	mi	Cantons	Lowest point	Highest point
with Italy (Note: Italian regions of Aosta Valley (canton of Valais), Piedmont (cantons of Valais and Ticino), Lombardy (cantons of Ticino and Graubünden) and Trentino-Alto Adige/Südtirol (canton of Graubünden))	734.2	460	Valais; Ticino; Graubünden	Lake Maggiore (193 m)	Grenzgipfel (4,618 m)
with France (Note: French regions of Grand Est (cantons of Basel-Stadt, Basel-Landschaft, Solothurn and Jura), Bourgogne-Franche-Comté (cantons of Vaud, Neuchâtel and Jura) and Auvergne-Rhône-Alpes (cantons of Geneva, Vaud and Valais))	571.8	356	Basel-City; Basel-Country; Solothurn; Jura; Neuchâtel; Vaud; Geneva; Valais	Rhine at Basel (246 m)	Aiguille d'Argentière (3,901 m)
with Germany (Note: German states of Bavaria (cantons of St. Gallen and Thurgau) and Baden-Württemberg (cantons of St. Gallen, Thurgau, Schaffhausen, Zürich, Aargau, Basel-Landschaft and Basel-Stadt))	345.7	208	Basel-City; Basel-Country; Aargau; Zürich; Schaffhausen; Thurgau; St. Gallen	Rhine at Basel (246 m)	Randen mountains near Beggingen (900 m)
with Austria (Note: Austrian states of Tyrol (canton of Graubünden) and Vorarlberg (cantons of Graubünden and St. Gallen))	165.1	102	St. Gallen; Graubünden	Lake Constance (395 m)	Fluchthorn (3,398 m)
with Liechtenstein	41.1	25	St. Gallen; Graubünden	Rhine near Sennwald (430 m)	Grauspitz (2599 m)
Total	1852	1,151	the ones mentioned above	Lake Maggiore (193 m)	Grenzgipfel (4,618 m)

The border of Switzerland has six tripoints, of which two are located in rivers, one undefined location in the Lake of Constance, and the three others in high mountains.

=== Elevation extremes ===
- Lowest point: Lake Maggiore: 193 m (633 ft)
- Highest point: Monte Rosa: 4,634 m (15,203 ft)
- Deepest point: in Lake Maggiore: −79 m (−259 ft)

== Western or Central Europe ==
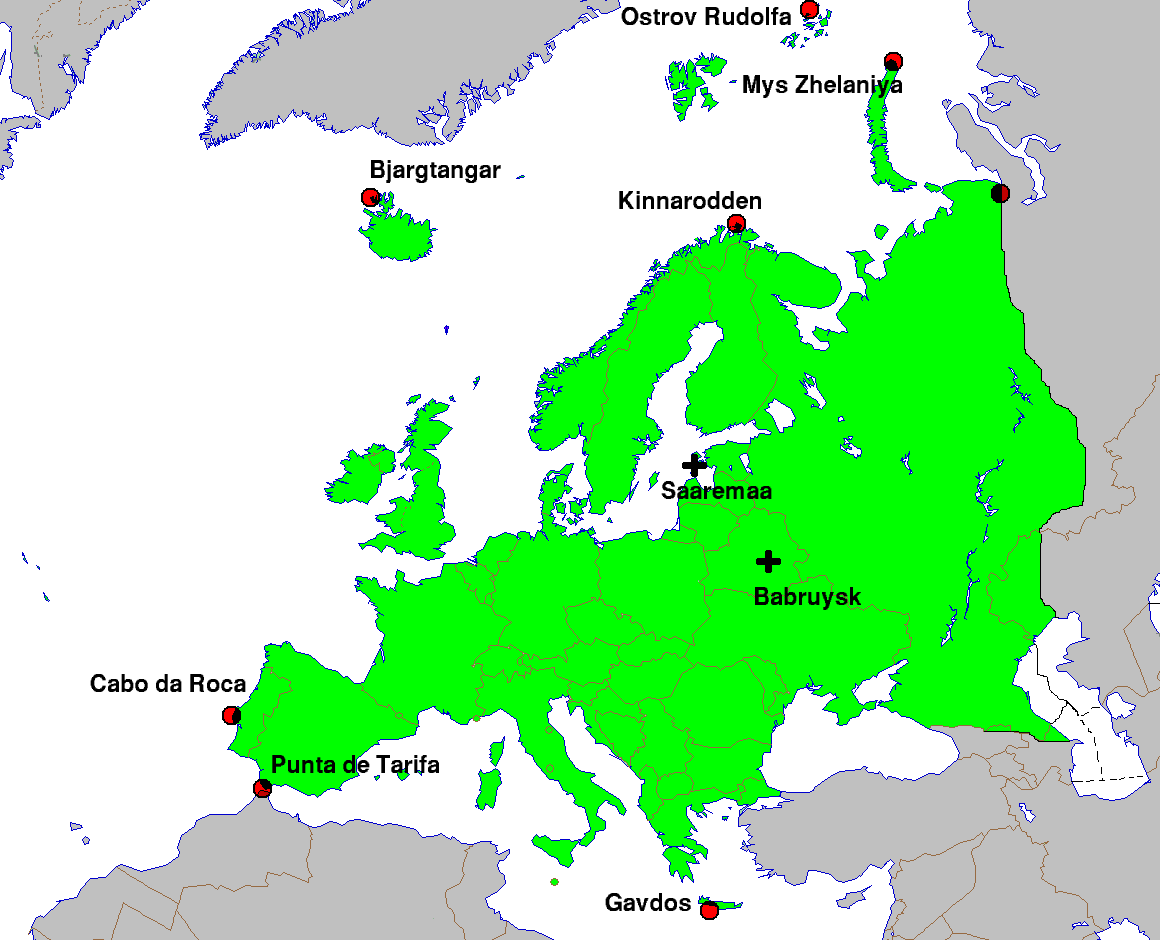
Current measurements of extreme points of Europe and its centres

No subdivision of Europe is universally accepted, therefore naming the different European regions and defining the borders between them is subject to debates. Depending on the definition chosen, Switzerland can be either part of Western or Central Europe: both concepts depend heavily on context and carry cultural, economic and political connotations.

The term "Western Europe" commonly indicates the region west of the Baltic and Adriatic Sea. Countries described as Western European (including Switzerland, according to the United Nations Statistics Division and the National Geographic Society) are invariably high-income developed countries, characterized by stable democratic political systems, mixed economies combining the free market with aspects of the welfare state. On the other hand, the term "Central Europe" refers to the region between Western and Eastern Europe. Central European countries (including Switzerland in the westernmost part, according to the World Factbook and various encyclopedias such as Britannica and Columbia) show high disparities with regard to income but possibly share similar cultural characteristics. The concept came back into use by the end of the Cold War, which had divided Europe politically into the Western World and the East Bloc, splitting Central Europe in half. Before World War I, the German-speaking world used the somewhat-related term Mitteleuropa (from German: Middle Europe) for an area larger than most conceptions of Central Europe, notably encompassing Switzerland among the other German-speaking countries.

Physically, Switzerland is situated approximately in the middle of the portion of Europe west of the Carpathian Mountains. Defining the Ural Mountains as the eastern limit of the continent, Switzerland is located within the western third of Europe, approximately 15 degrees of longitude away from the extreme west and 50 degrees away from extreme east. Phytogeographically, the part of Switzerland that lies north of the Alps belongs to Central Europe, while the part south of the Alps belongs to Southern Europe.

== Natural World Heritage Sites ==
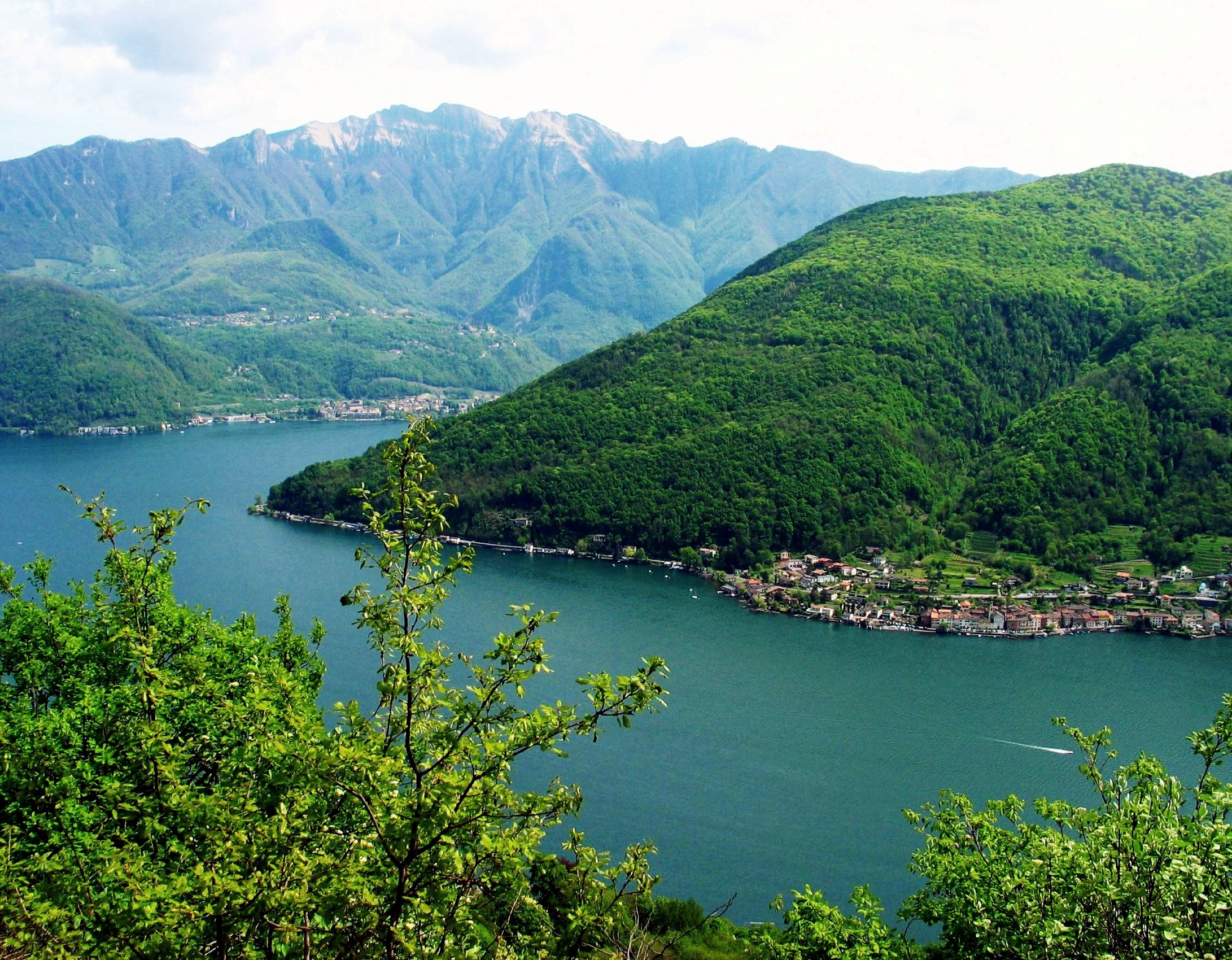
Monte San Giorgio

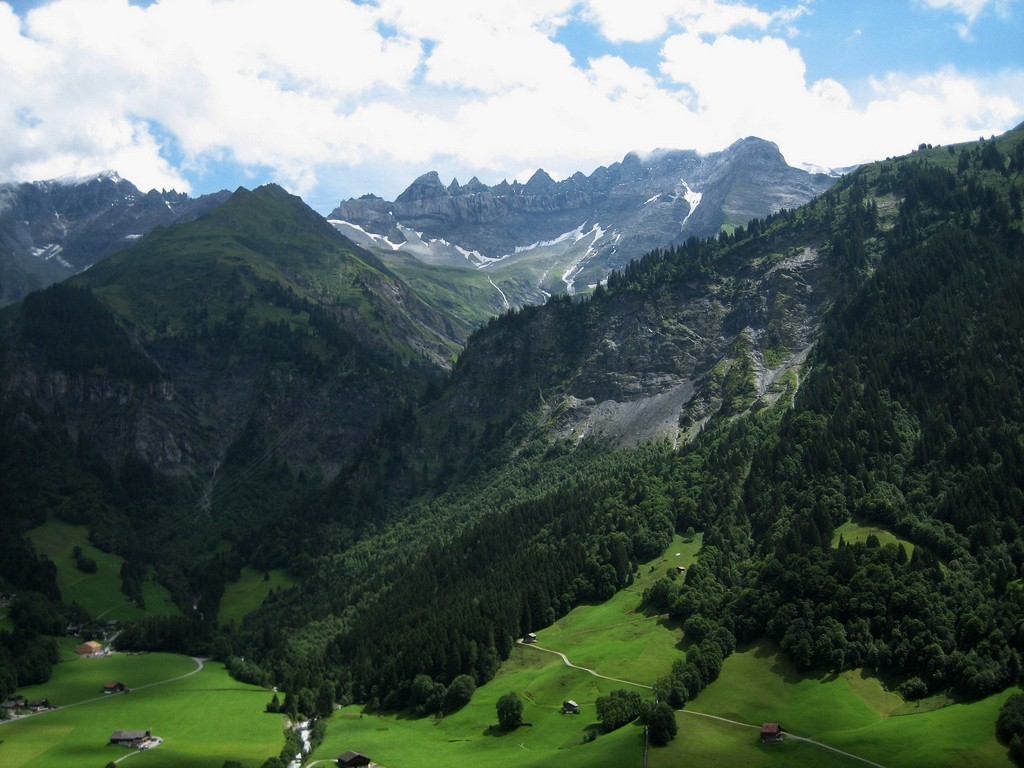
Glarus thrust

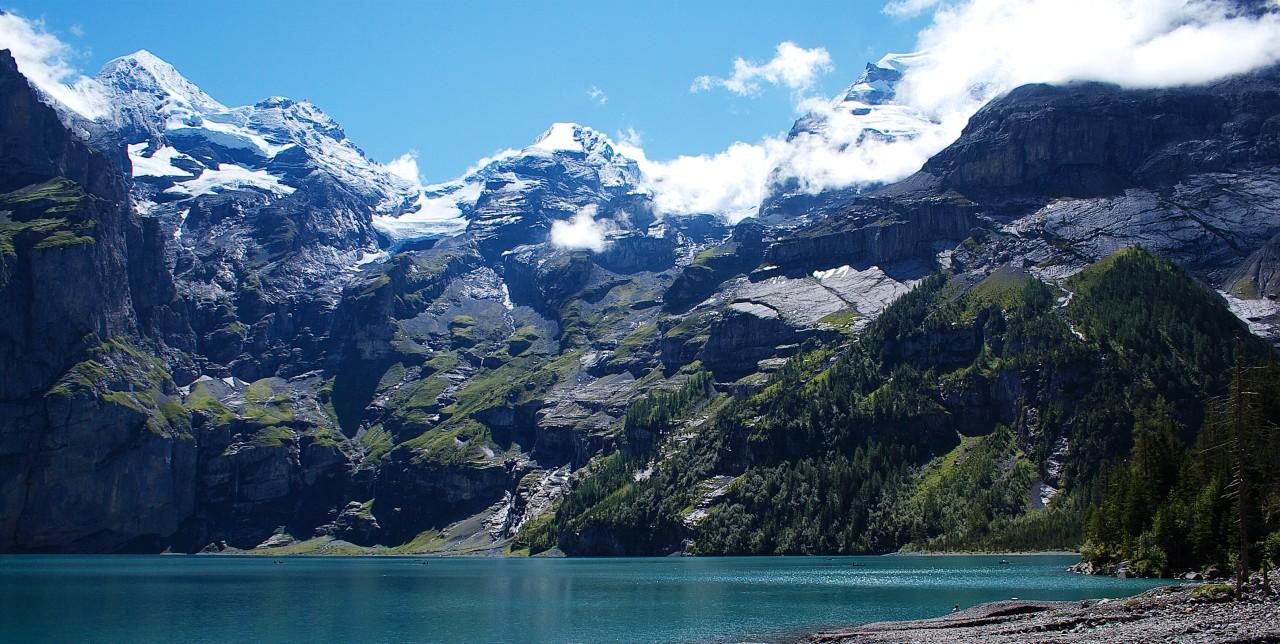
Oeschinen Lake

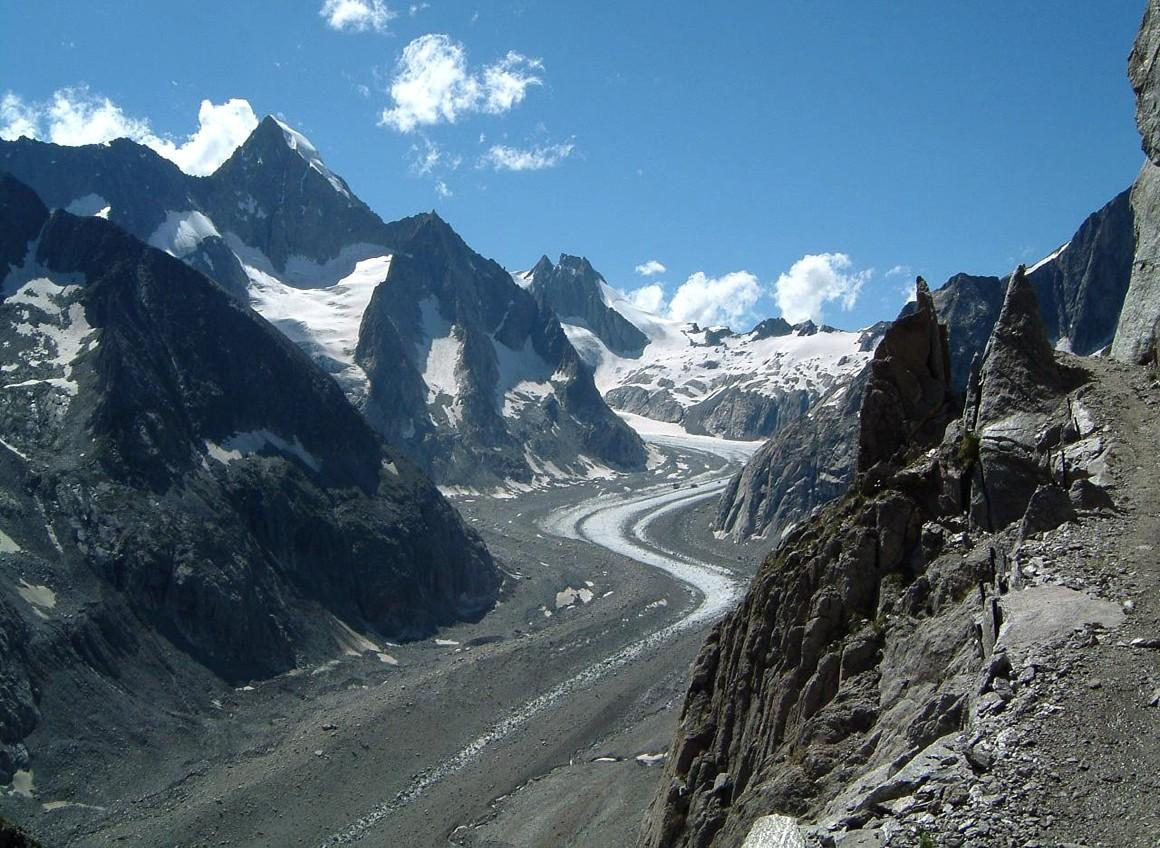
Oberaletsch Glacier

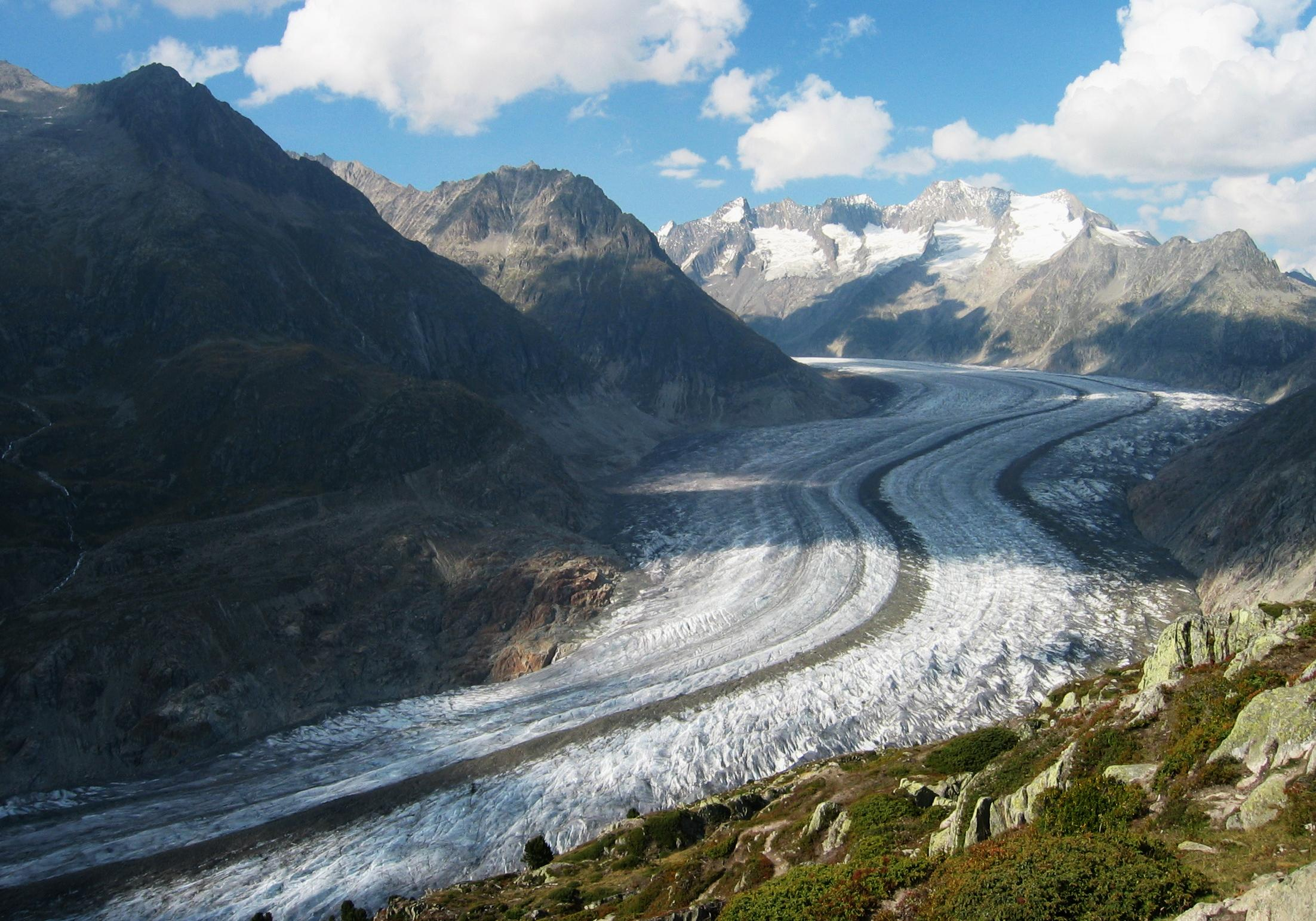
Aletsch Glacier

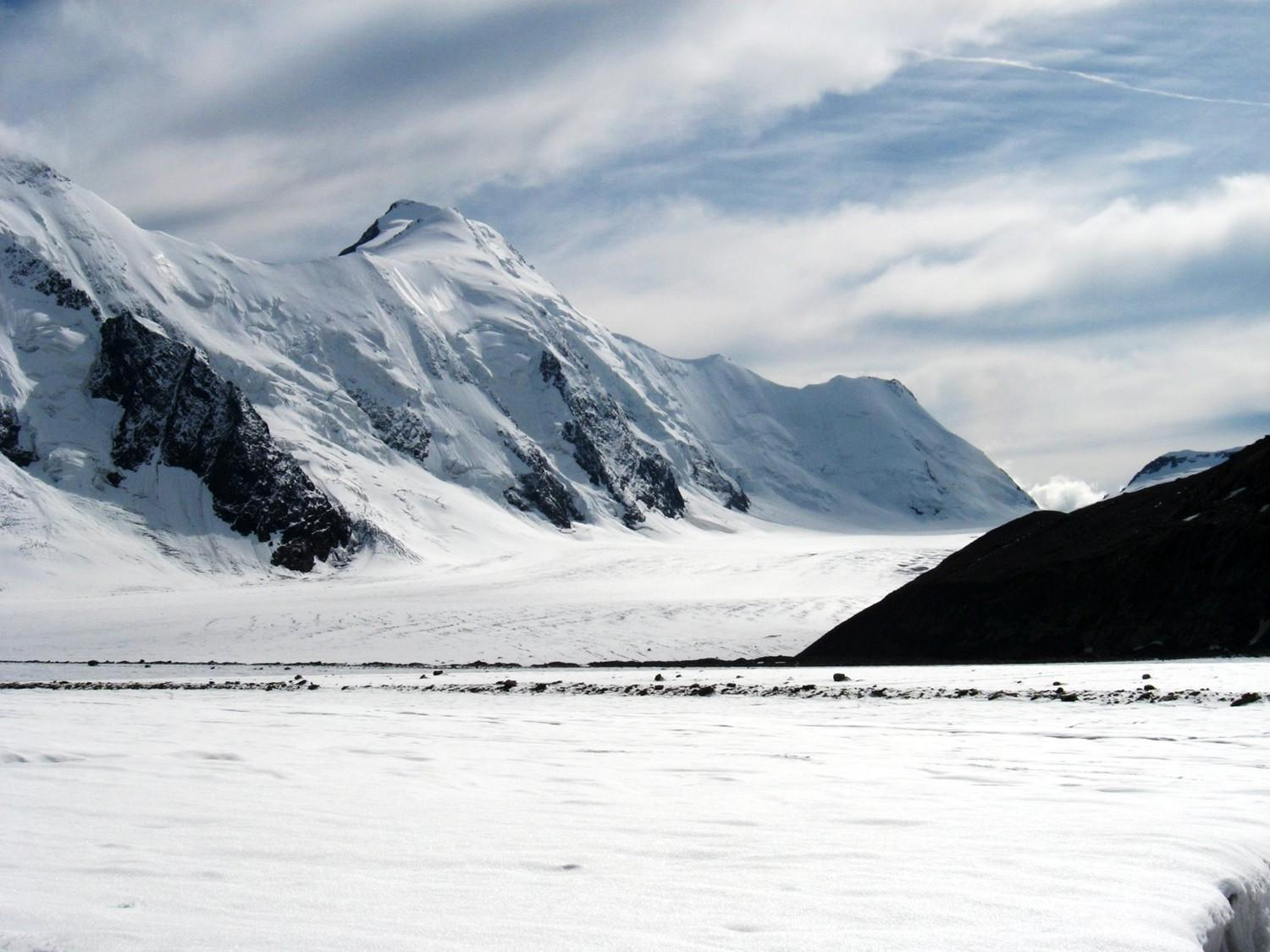
Konkordiaplatz

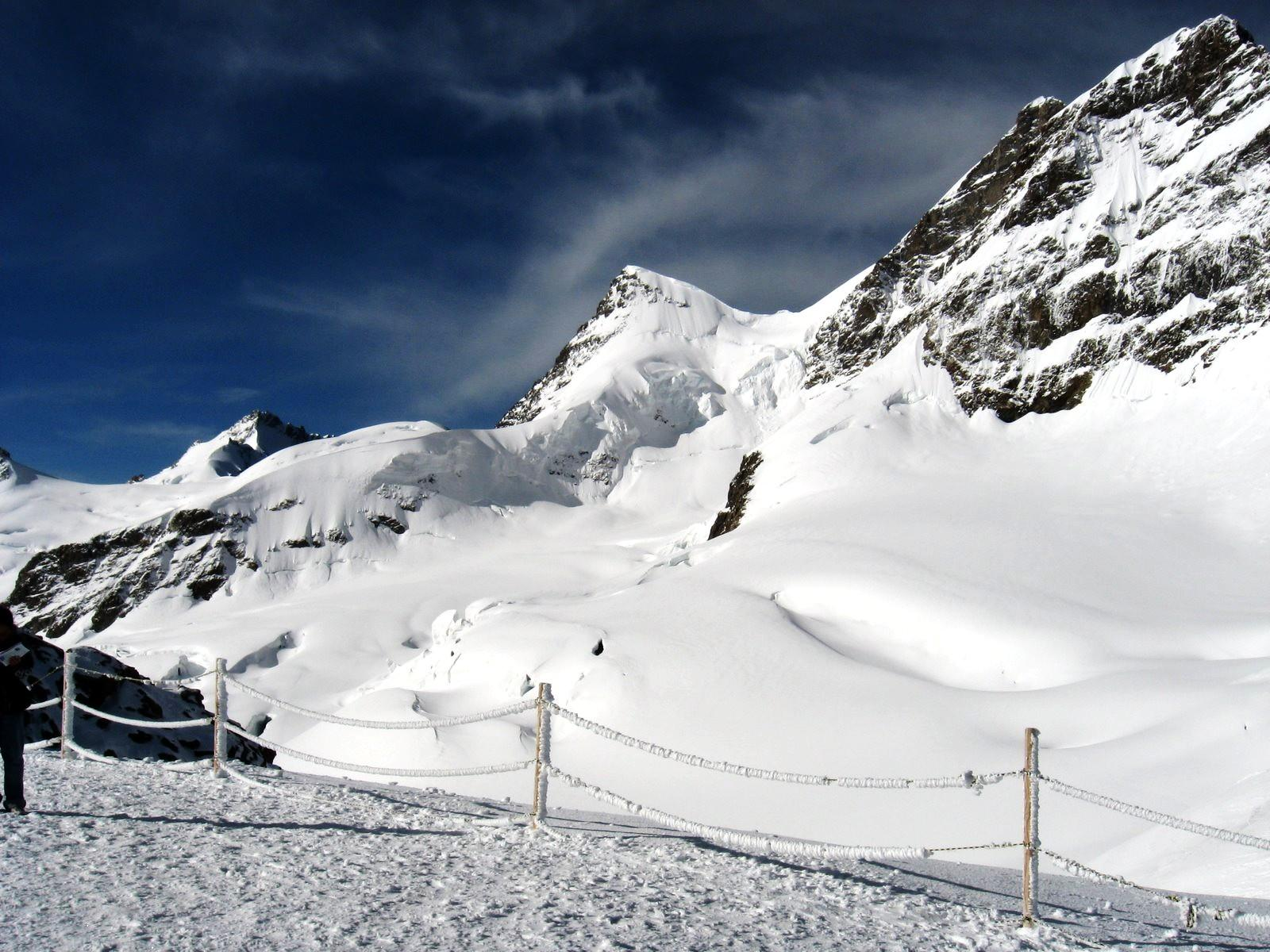
Jungfraujoch

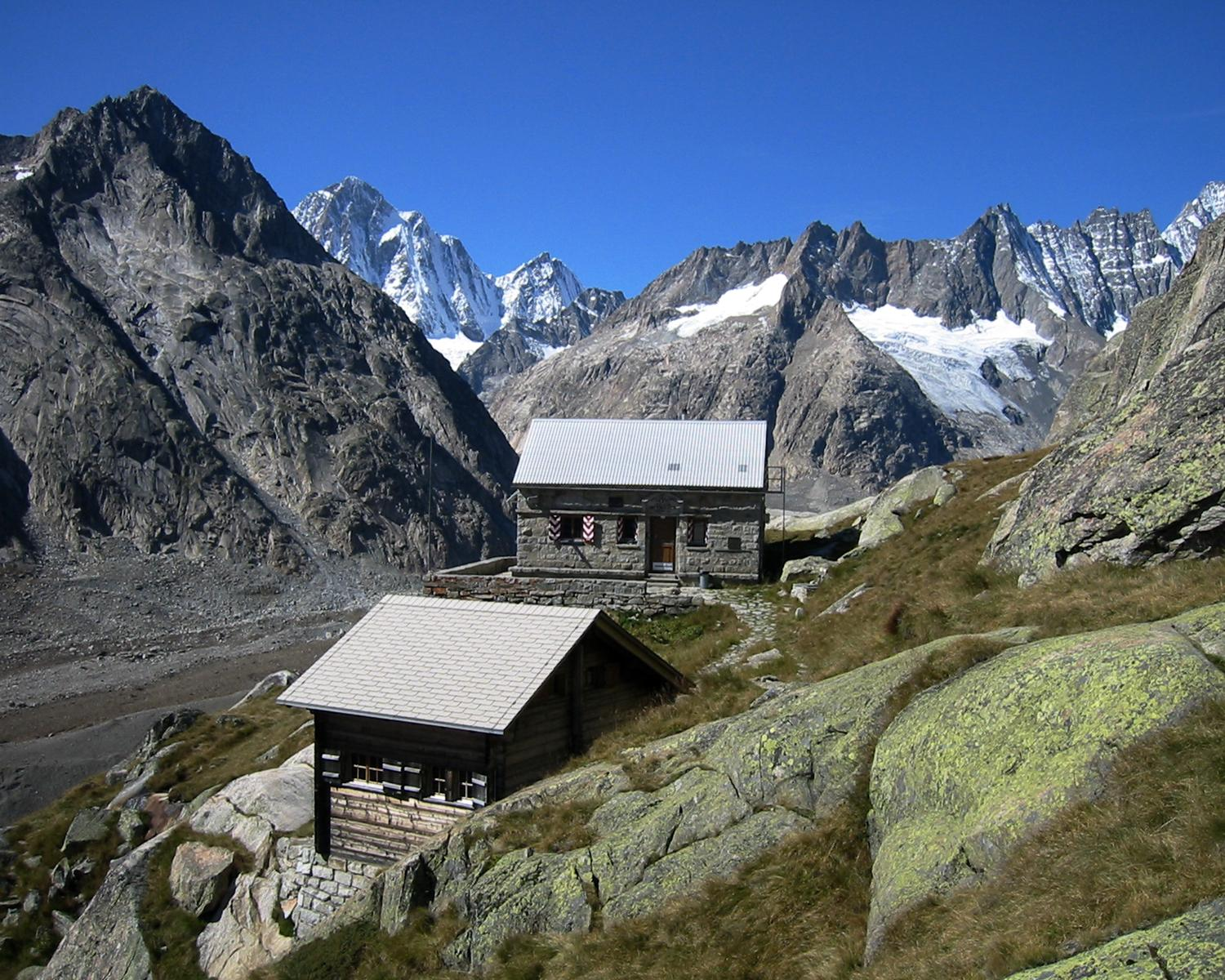
Unteraar Glacier

== Topography ==
- Extreme points of Switzerland
- Geographical centre of Switzerland
- List of caves in Switzerland
- List of glaciers in Switzerland
- List of islands of Switzerland
- List of lakes in Switzerland
- List of mountain passes in Switzerland
- List of mountain ranges in Switzerland
- List of mountains in Switzerland
- List of rivers of Switzerland
- List of waterfalls of Switzerland

== See also ==
- Geography of the Alps
- Swiss cartography
- Valleys of the Alps
- Little Switzerland (landscape)
- Spatial planning in Switzerland
- Swiss Federal Office of Topography

== Bibliography ==
- (In French) Martine Rebetez, La Suisse se réchauffe. Effet de serre et changement climatique, fourth edition, collection « Le savoir suisse », Presses polytechniques et universitaires romandes, 2011 (ISBN 9782880749224).
