= Lange Rande =

Mountain in Switzerland

- Location within Switzerland

Highest point
- Elevation: 900 m (2,953 ft)
- Prominence: 75 m (246 ft)
- Parent peak: Hoher Randen
- Coordinates: 47°44′25″N 08°32′05″E

Geography
- Country: Switzerland
- Canton: Schaffhausen
- Parent range: Randen
- Topo map: swisstopo

The Lange Rande (900 m (2,953 ft)) is a mountain in the Randen range between the Jura and the Swabian Jura, located between Schleitheim and Hemmental in the Swiss canton of Schaffhausen.

After the Hage, the Lange Rande is the second highest mountain of Schaffhausen.
