= Table Jura =

Mountain chain in Switzerland and Germany

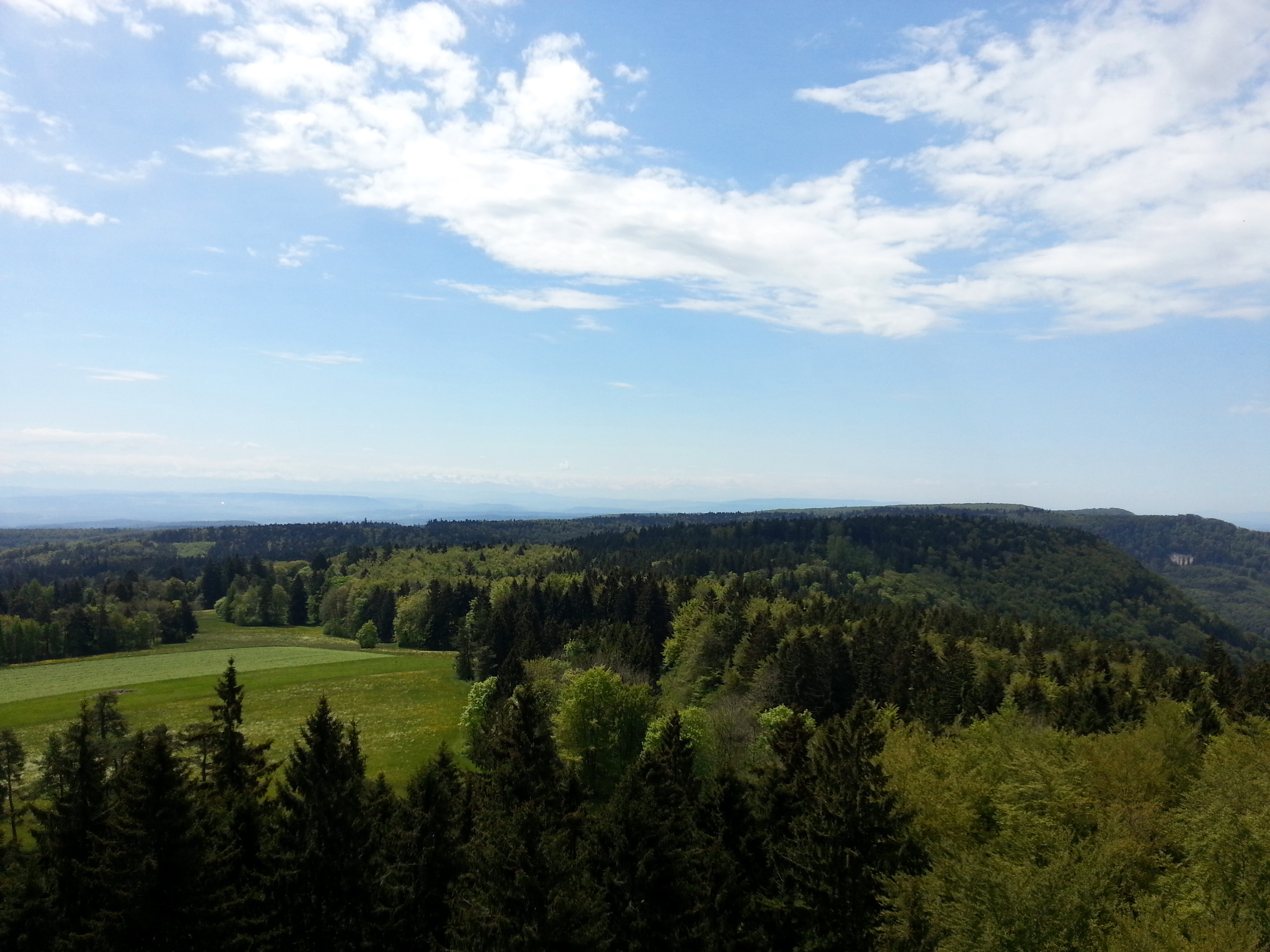
- View over Randen from Hagenturm on Hage mountain

Highest point
- Peak: Lemberg
- Elevation: 1,015 m (3,330 ft)
- Coordinates: 48°09′02″N 8°44′57″E

Geography
- Countries: Germany and Switzerland
- Cantons/States: Basel-Landschaft, Aargau, Schaffhausen, Baden-Württemberg and Bavaria
- Range coordinates: 50°16′N 10°58′E

The so-called Table Jura or Plateau Jura (German: Tafeljura; French: Jura tabulaire) is the northeastern extension of the Jura Mountains. It stands in opposition to the folded Jura (Faltenjura) of the Jura range proper.

The Table Jura stretches across the Swiss cantons of Basel-Landschaft, Aargau and Schaffhausen into southern Germany (Baden-Württemberg, Bavaria). It includes the Randen, Baar, the Swabian Jura and the Franconian Jura. The Table Jura thus ranges from near the Swiss city of Basel to the German city of Coburg.

The range is crossed by the Rhine (High Rhine) and upper part of the Danube.
