= Randen (mountain range) =

Mountain in Switzerland

Coordinates: 47°46′N 8°35′E

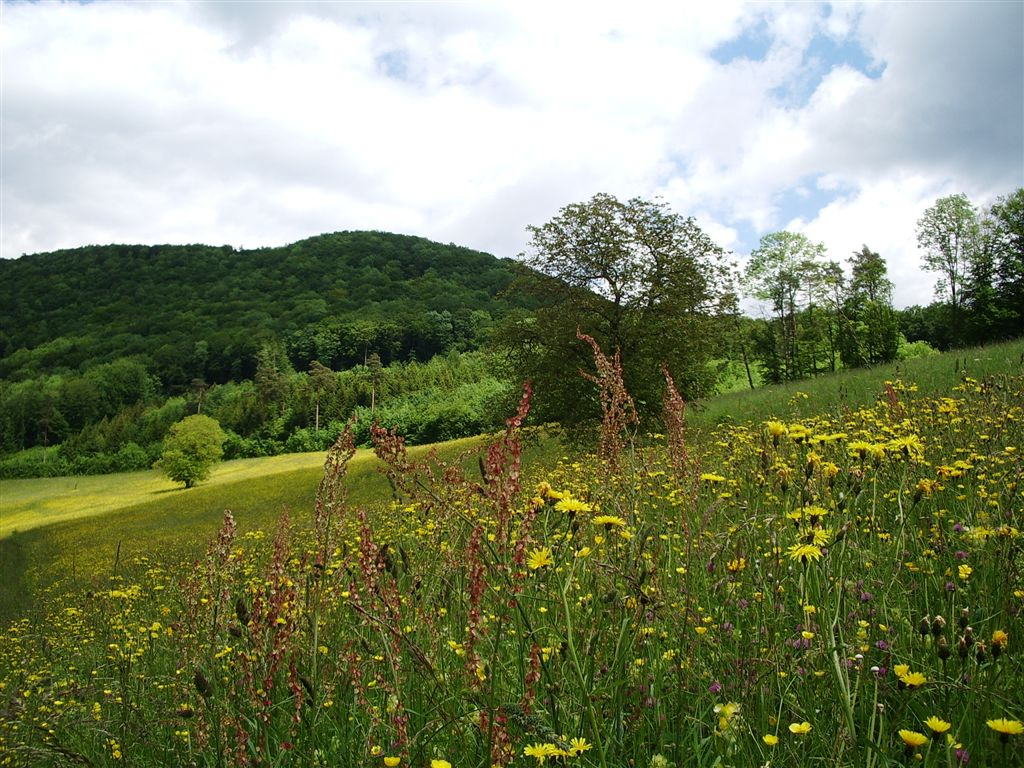
- View from near the Lange Rande

Highest point
- Peak: Schlattersteig (Hoher Randen)
- Elevation: 930 m (3,050 ft)

Naming
- Language of name: German

Geography
- Location within Switzerland Location within Germany
- Countries: Switzerland and Germany
- Canton/Bundesland: Schaffhausen and Baden-Württemberg
- Borders on: Jura Mountains and Swabian Jura
- Topo map: Swisstopo

Geology
- Mountain type: Mountain range

The Randen is a small mountain range located between the Jura and the Swabian Jura, north of the Rhine. Predominantly located in the Swiss canton of Schaffhausen, they culminate in the German state of Baden-Württemberg. The Randen, which belong to the Table Jura (Tafeljura), are situated north of Schaffhausen and south of Blumberg.

The highest peak is the Schlattersteig (930 m (3,051 ft)), which is part of the more prominent Hoher Randen (909 m (2,982 ft)) in Germany. Other important summits are the Hage (912 m (2,992 ft)), the Lange Rande (900 m (2,953 ft)), and the Schlossranden (890 m (2,920 ft)) with the Schleitheimer Randenturm (896 m (2,940 ft)) in Switzerland.

== See also ==
- Geography of Germany
- Geography of Switzerland
