= Hage (Randen) =

Mountain in Switzerland

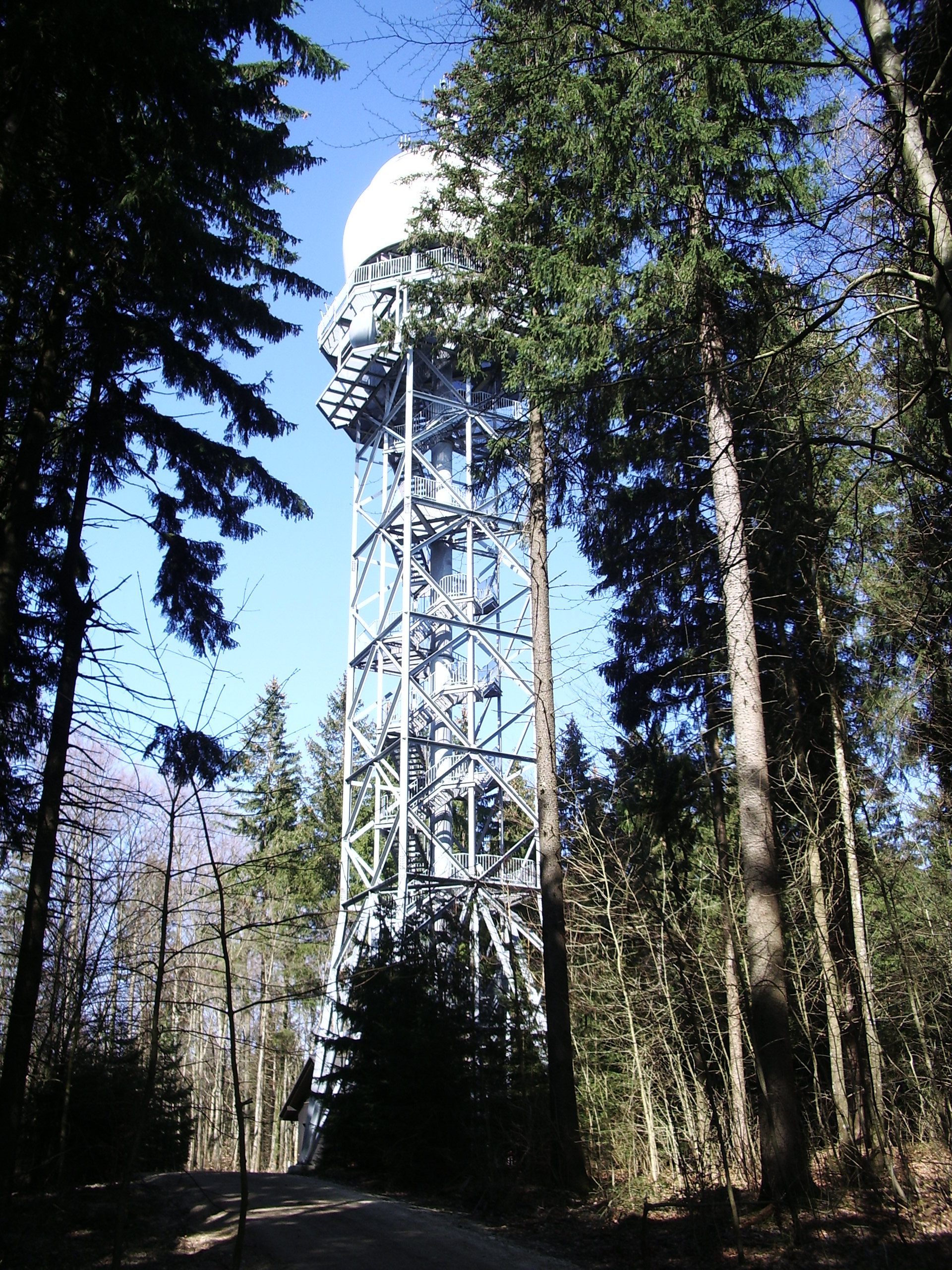
- The Hagenturm on the summit

Highest point
- Elevation: 912 m (2,992 ft)
- Prominence: 26 m (85 ft)
- Parent peak: Hoher Randen
- Listing: Canton high point
- Coordinates: 47°46′29″N 08°34′01″E

Naming
- Language of name: Swabian

Geography
- Location within Switzerland
- Location: Schaffhausen, Switzerland
- Parent range: Randen
- Topo map: swisstopo

The Hage (or Germanized: Hagen) is a mountain in the Randen range between the Jura and the Swabian Jura, located between Beggingen and Merishausen in the Swiss canton of Schaffhausen. Reaching a height of 912 metres above sea level, it is the highest point of the canton.

On the summit is located the Hagenturm, a 40-metre-high observation tower.
