= Hoher Randen =

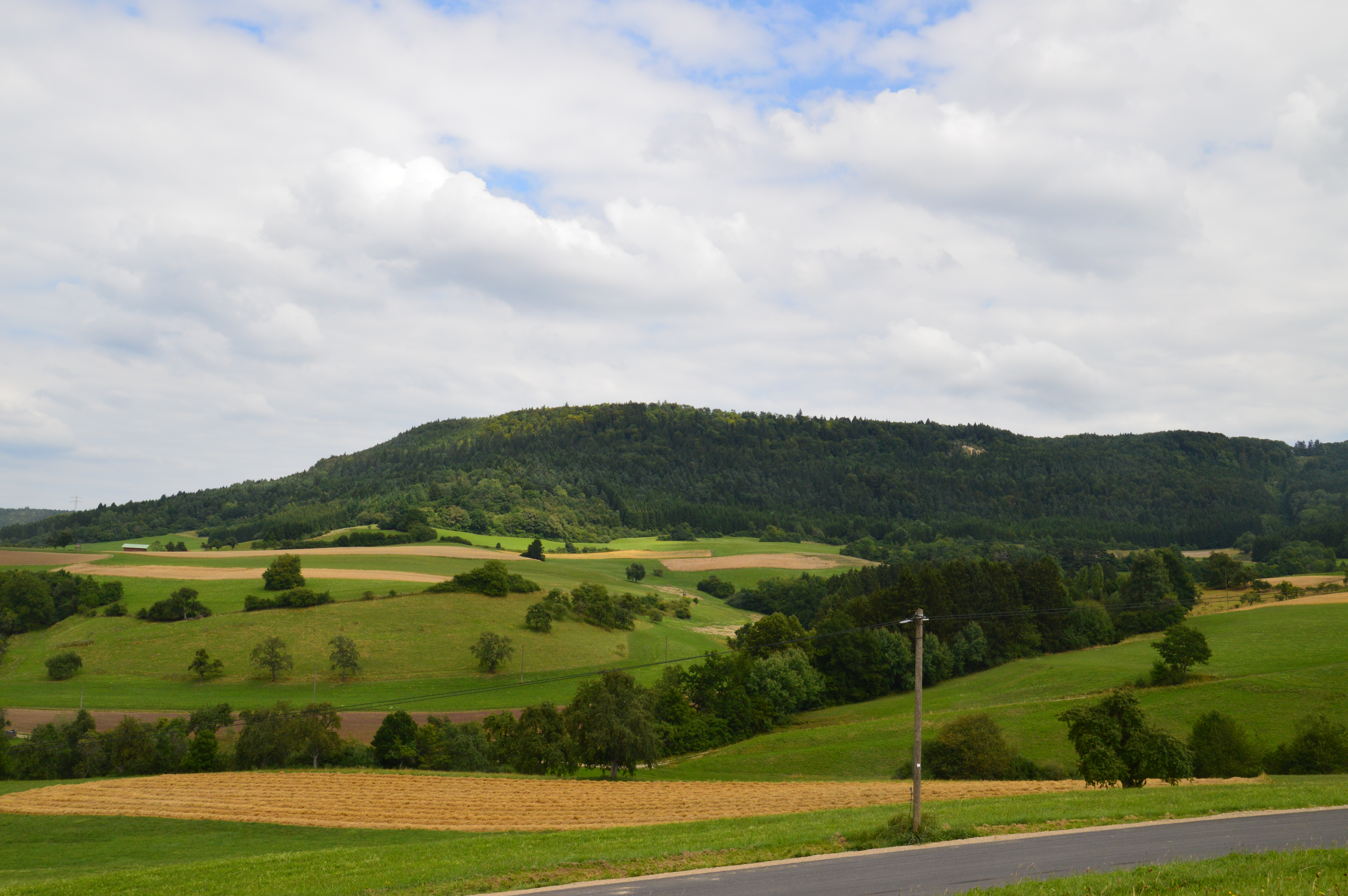

Highest point
- Peak: Schlattersteig
- Elevation: 930 m (3,051 ft)
- Prominence: 228 m (748 ft)
- Coordinates: 47°47′13″N 8°33′23″E

Geography
- Location within Germany
- Countries: Germany and (massif partially in Switzerland)
- Bundesland: Baden-Württemberg
- Parent range: Randen

The Hoher Randen 909 m (2,982 ft) with its Schlattersteig (930 m (3,051 ft)) is the highest mountain of the Randen, a range located between the Jura and the Swabian Jura. It is located south of Blumberg in the German state of Baden-Württemberg, near the border with the Swiss canton of Schaffhausen.
