= List of international environmental agreements =

This is a list of international environmental agreements.

Most of the following agreements are legally binding for countries that have formally ratified them. Some, such as the Kyoto Protocol, differentiate between types of countries and each nation's respective responsibilities under the agreement. Several hundred international environmental agreements exist but most cover only a limited number of countries. These bilateral or sometimes trilateral agreements are only binding for the countries that have ratified them but are nevertheless essential in the international environmental regime. Including the major conventions listed below, more than 3,000 international environmental instruments have been identified by the IEA Database Project.

== Alphabetical order ==
- Aarhus Convention on Access to Information, Public Participation in Decision-making and Access to Justice in Environmental Matters, Aarhus, 1998
- Agreement on the Conservation of African-Eurasian Migratory Waterbirds
- Alpine Convention together with its nine protocols
- Anti-Ballistic Missile Treaty (ABM Treaty) (ABMT)
- ASEAN Agreement on Transboundary Haze Pollution
- Asia-Pacific Partnership on Clean Development and Climate
- Barcelona Convention for Protection against Pollution in the Mediterranean Sea, 1976
- Basel Convention on the Control of Transboundary Movements of Hazardous Wastes and their Disposal, Basel, 1989
- Biological Weapons Convention (Convention on the Prohibition of the Development, Production and Stockpiling of Bacteriological [Biological] and Toxin Weapons and on their Destruction) (BWC)
- Bonn Agreement
- Carpathian Convention Framework Convention on the Protection and Sustainable Development of the Carpathians
- Cartagena Protocol on Biosafety
- Chemical Weapons Convention
- China Australia Migratory Bird Agreement
- Coastal Marine and Island Biodiversity Conservation Project (Eritrea)
- Comprehensive Nuclear-Test-Ban Treaty (CTBT), 1996
- Convention for the Conservation of Antarctic Marine Living Resources (CCAMLR), Canberra, 1980
  - Agreed Measures for the Conservation of Antarctic Fauna and Flora
  - Convention for the Conservation of Antarctic Marine Living Resources
  - Convention for the Conservation of Antarctic Seals
  - Protocol on Environmental Protection to the Antarctic Treaty
- Convention for Co-operation in the Protection and Development of the Marine and Coastal Environment of the West and Central African Region, Abidjan, 1981
- Convention for the Protection and Development of the Marine Environment of the Wider Caribbean Region, Cartagena de Indias, 1983
- Convention of the Protection, Management and Development of the Marine and Coastal Environment of the Eastern African Region, Nairobi, 1985
- Convention for the Protection of the Marine Environment and Coastal Area of the South-east Pacific, Lima, 1981
- Convention for the Protection of the Marine Environment of the North-east Atlantic (OSPAR Convention), Paris, 1992
- Convention for the Protection of the Natural Resources and Environment of the South Pacific Region, Nouméa, 1986
- Convention on Assistance in the Case of a Nuclear Accident or Radiological Emergency (Assistance Convention), Vienna, 1986
- Convention on the Ban of the Import into Africa and the Control of Transboundary Movements and Management of Hazardous Wastes within Africa, Bamako, 1991
- Convention on Biological Diversity (CBD), Nairobi, 1992
- Convention on Certain Conventional Weapons
- Convention on Civil Liability for Damage Caused during Carriage of Dangerous Goods by Road, Rail, and Inland Navigation Vessels (CRTD), Geneva, 1989
- Convention on Cluster Munitions
- Convention on the Conservation of European Wildlife and Natural Habitats
- Convention on the Conservation of Migratory Species of Wild Animals (CMS), Bonn, 1979
- Convention on Early Notification of a Nuclear Accident (Notification Convention), Vienna, 1986
- Convention on Fishing and Conservation of Living Resources of the High Seas
- Convention on the International Trade in Endangered Species of Wild Flora and Fauna (CITES), Washington, DC, 1973
- Convention on Long-Range Transboundary Air Pollution
- Convention on Nature Protection and Wild Life Preservation in the Western Hemisphere, Washington, DC, 1940
- Convention on Nuclear Safety, Vienna, 1994
  - EMEP Protocol
  - Heavy Metals Protocol
  - Multi-effect Protocol (Gothenburg protocol)
  - Nitrogen Oxide Protocol
  - POP Air Pollution Protocol
  - Sulphur Emissions Reduction Protocols 1985 and 1994
  - Volatile Organic Compounds Protocol
- Convention on the Prevention of Marine Pollution by Dumping Wastes and Other Matter
- Convention on the Prohibition of Military or Any Other Hostile Use of Environmental Modification Techniques
- Convention on the Protection and Use of Transboundary Watercourses and International Lakes (ECE Water Convention), Helsinki, 1992
- Convention on the Protection of the Black Sea against Pollution, Bucharest, 1992
- Convention on the Protection of the Marine Environment of the Baltic Sea Area 1992 Helsinki Convention, Helsinki, 1992
- Convention on the Transboundary Effects of Industrial Accidents, Helsinki, 1992
- Convention on Wetlands of International Importance Especially As Waterfowl Habitat (notably not a Multilateral Environmental Agreement)
- Convention to Ban the Importation into Forum Island Countries of Hazardous and Radioactive Wastes and to Control the Transboundary Movement and Management of Hazardous Wastes within the South Pacific Region, Waigani, 1995
- Convention to Combat Desertification (CCD), Paris, 1994
- Conventions within the UNEP Regional Seas Programme
- Directive on the legal protection of biotechnological inventions
- Energy Community (Energy Community South East Europe Treaty) (ECSEE)
- Espoo Convention Convention on Environmental Impact Assessment in a Transboundary Context, Espoo, 1991
- European Agreement Concerning the International Carriage of Dangerous Goods by Inland Waterways (ADN), Geneva, 2000
- European Agreement Concerning the International Carriage of Dangerous Goods by Road (ADR), Geneva, 1957
- FAO International Code of Conduct on the Distribution and Use of Pesticides, Rome, 1985
- FAO International Undertaking on Plant Genetic Resources, Rome, 1983
- Framework Convention for the Protection of the Marine Environment of the Caspian Sea
- Framework Convention on Climate Change (UNFCCC), New York, 1992
- Geneva Protocol (Protocol for the Prohibition of the Use in War of Asphyxiating, Poisonous or other Gases, and of Bacteriological Methods of Warfare)
- International Convention for the Conservation of Atlantic Tunas (ICCAT), Rio de Janeiro, 1966
- International Convention for the Prevention of Pollution from Ships
- International Convention for the Prevention of Pollution of the Sea by Oil, London, 1954, 1962, 1969
- International Convention for the Regulation of Whaling (ICRW), Washington, 1946
- International Treaty on Plant Genetic Resources for Food and Agriculture
- International Tropical Timber Agreement (expired), 1983
- International Tropical Timber Agreement (ITTA), Geneva, 1994
- Kuwait Regional Convention for Co-operation on the Protection of the Marine Environment from Pollution, Kuwait, 1978
- Kyoto Protocol - greenhouse gas emission reductions
- Migratory Bird Treaty Act of 1918
- Minamata Convention on Mercury, 2013
- Montreal Protocol on Substances that Deplete the Ozone Layer, Montreal, 1989
- Nagoya Protocol
- North American Agreement on Environmental Cooperation
- Paris Agreement, France, 2015
- Protocol on Environmental Protection to the Antarctic Treaty
- Putrajaya Declaration of Regional Cooperation for the Sustainable Development of the Seas of East Asia, Malaysia, 2003
- Ramsar Convention Convention on Wetlands of International Importance, especially as Waterfowl Habitat, Ramsar, 1971
- Regional Convention for the Conservation of the Red Sea and the Gulf of Aden Environment, Jeddah, 1982
- Rotterdam Convention on the Prior Informed Consent Procedure for Certain Hazardous Chemicals and Pesticides in International Trade, Rotterdam, 1998
- Stockholm Convention Stockholm Convention on Persistent Organic Pollutants Stockholm, 2001
- Treaty Banning Nuclear Weapon Tests in the Atmosphere, in Outer Space, and Under Water
- United Nations Convention on the Law of the Sea
- United Nations Convention to Combat Desertification
- United Nations Framework Convention on Climate Change
- Vienna Convention for the Protection of the Ozone Layer, Vienna, 1985, including the Montreal Protocol on Substances that Deplete the Ozone Layer, Montreal, 1987
- Vienna Convention on Civil Liability for Nuclear Damage, Vienna, 1963
- Western Regional Climate Action Initiative
- Working Environment (Air Pollution, Noise and Vibration) Convention, 1977

== Topic order ==
=== General ===
- Aarhus Convention Convention on Access to Information, Public Participation in Decision-making and Access to Justice in Environmental Matters, Aarhus, 1998
- Espoo Convention Convention on Environmental Impact Assessment in a Transboundary Context, Espoo, 1991

=== Atmosphere ===
- Convention on Long-Range Transboundary Air Pollution (LRTAP), Geneva, 1979
- Environmental Protection: Aircraft Engine Emissions, Annex 16, vol. 2 to the Chicago Convention on International Civil Aviation, Montreal, 1981
- Framework Convention on Climate Change (UNFCCC), New York, 1992, including the Kyoto Protocol, 1997, and the Paris Agreement, 2015
- Georgia Basin-Puget Sound International Airshed Strategy, Vancouver, Statement of Intent, 2002
- U.S.-Canada Air Quality Agreement (bilateral U.S.-Canadian agreement on acid rain), 1986
- Vienna Convention for the Protection of the Ozone Layer, Vienna, 1985, including the Montreal Protocol on Substances that Deplete the Ozone Layer, Montreal, 1987

=== Freshwater resources ===
- Convention on the Protection and Use of Transboundary Watercourses and International Lakes (ECE Water Convention), Helsinki, 1992

=== Hazardous substances ===
- Convention on Civil Liability for Damage Caused during Carriage of Dangerous Goods by Road, Rail, and Inland Navigation Vessels (CRTD), Geneva, 1989
- Convention on the Control of Transboundary Movements of Hazardous Wastes and their Disposal, Basel, 1989
- Convention on the Ban of the Import into Africa and the Control of Transboundary Movements and Management of Hazardous Wastes Within Africa, Bamako, 1991
- Convention on the Prior Informed Consent Procedure for Certain Hazardous Chemicals and Pesticides in International Trade, Rotterdam, 1998
- Convention on the Transboundary Effects of Industrial Accidents, Helsinki, 1992
- European Agreement Concerning the International Carriage of Dangerous Goods by Inland Waterways (AND), Geneva, 2000
- European Agreement Concerning the International Carriage of Dangerous Goods by Road (ADR), Geneva, 1957
- FAO International Code of Conduct on the Distribution and Use of Pesticides, Rome, 1985
- Minamata Convention on Mercury, Minamata, 2013
- Stockholm Convention Stockholm Convention on Persistent Organic Pollutants Stockholm, 2001
- Convention to Ban the Importation into Forum Island Countries of Hazardous and Radioactive Wastes and to Control the Transboundary Movement and Management of Hazardous Wastes within the South Pacific Region, Waigani, 1995

=== Marine environment – global conventions ===
- Convention on the Prevention of Marine Pollution by Dumping of Wastes and Other Matter (London Convention), London, 1972
- International Convention for the Prevention of Pollution from Ships, 1973, as modified by the Protocol of 1978 relating thereto (MARPOL 73/78), London, 1973 and 1978
- International Convention for the Prevention of Pollution of the Sea by Oil, London, 1954, 1962 and 1969
- International Convention on Civil Liability for Oil Pollution Damage (CLC), Brussels, 1969, 1976,1984 and 1992
- International Convention on the Establishment of an International Fund for Compensation for Oil Pollution Damage (FUND)1971 and 1992, Brussels, 1971/1992
- International Convention on Liability and Compensation for Damage in Connection with the Carriage of Hazardous and Noxious Substances by Sea (HNS), London, 1996
- International Convention on Oil Pollution Preparedness, Response and Co-operation (OPRC), London, 1990
- International Convention Relating to Intervention on the High Seas in Cases of Oil Pollution Casualties Intervention Convention, Brussels, 1969
- Protocol on Preparedness, Response and Co-operation to Pollution Incidents by Hazardous and Noxious Substances OPRC-HNS Protocol, London, 2000
- United Nations Convention on the Law of the Sea LOS Convention, Montego Bay, 1982

=== Marine environment – regional conventions ===
- Convention for Co-operation in the Protection and Development of the Marine and Coastal Environment of the West and Central African Region, Abidjan, 1981
- Convention for the Protection and Development of the Marine Environment and Coastal Region of the Mediterranean Sea Barcelona Convention, Barcelona, 1976
- Convention for the Protection and Development of the Marine Environment of the Wider Caribbean Region, Cartagena de Indias, 1983
- Convention for the Protection, Management and Development of the Marine and Coastal Environment of the Eastern African Region (Nairobi Convention), Nairobi, 1985
- Convention for the Protection of the Marine Environment and Coastal Area of the South-east Pacific, Lima, 1981
- Convention for the Protection of the Marine Environment of the North-east Atlantic OSPAR Convention, Paris, 1992
- Convention for the Protection of the Natural Resources and Environment of the South Pacific Region, Nouméa, 1986
- Convention on the Protection of the Black Sea against Pollution, Bucharest, 1992
- Convention on the Protection of the Marine Environment of the Baltic Sea Area Helsinki Convention (HELCOM), Helsinki, 1974, 1992
- Conventions within the UNEP Regional Seas Programme
- Framework Convention for the Protection of the Marine Environment of the Caspian Sea
- Kuwait Regional Convention for Co-operation on the Protection of the Marine Environment from Pollution, Kuwait, 1978
- Regional Convention for the Conservation of the Red Sea and the Gulf of Aden Environment, Jeddah, 1982

=== Marine living resources ===
- Agreement on the Conservation of Albatrosses and Petrels
- Agreement on the Conservation of Cetaceans in the Black Sea, Mediterranean Sea and contiguous Atlantic area (ACCOBAMS), Monaco, 1996
- Agreement on the Conservation of Small Cetaceans of the Baltic, North East Atlantic, Irish and North Seas (ASCOBANS), New York, 1992
- Convention for the Conservation of Antarctic Marine Living Resources (CCAMLR), Canberra, 1980
  - Agreed Measures for the Conservation of Antarctic Fauna and Flora
  - Convention for the Conservation of Antarctic Marine Living Resources
  - Convention for the Conservation of Antarctic Seals
  - Protocol on Environmental Protection to the Antarctic Treaty
- Convention on the Conservation of Migratory Species of Wild Animals (CMS), Bonn, 1979
- International Convention for the Conservation of Atlantic Tunas (ICCAT), Rio de Janeiro, 1966
- International Convention for the Regulation of Whaling (ICRW), Washington, 1946

=== Nature conservation and terrestrial living resources ===
- Antarctic Treaty, Washington, DC, 1959
- Amazon Cooperation Treaty, Brasilia, 1978
- Convention on Biological Diversity (CBD), Nairobi, 1992
- Convention on the Conservation of Migratory Species of Wild Animals (CMS), Bonn, 1979
- Convention on the International Trade in Endangered Species of Wild Flora and Fauna (CITES), Washington, DC, 1973
- Organization of American States Convention on Nature Protection and Wild Life Preservation in the Western Hemisphere, Washington, DC, 1940
- United Nations Convention to Combat Desertification (UNCCD), Paris, 1994
- Food and Agriculture Organization International Undertaking on Plant Genetic Resources, Rome, 1983
  - the 1983 "voluntary undertaking" was updated and strengthened as the International Treaty on Plant Genetic Resources for Food and Agriculture, Madrid, 2001
- International Tropical Timber Agreement (ITTA), Geneva, 1994
- Memorandum of Understanding on the Conservation of Migratory Birds of Prey in Africa and Eurasia (Raptors MoU)
- Ramsar Convention on Wetlands of International Importance Especially as Waterfowl Habitat (a.k.a. the Convention on Wetlands), Ramsar, 1971
- UNESCO Convention Concerning the Protection of the World Cultural and Natural Heritage (a.k.a. the World Heritage Convention), Paris, 1972

=== Noise pollution ===
- Working Environment (Air Pollution, Noise and Vibration) Convention, 1977

=== Nuclear safety ===
- Comprehensive Nuclear-Test-Ban Treaty, 1996
- Convention on Assistance in the Case of a Nuclear Accident or Radiological Emergency (Assistance Convention), Vienna, 1986
- Convention on Early Notification of a Nuclear Accident (Notification Convention), Vienna, 1986
- Convention on Nuclear Safety, Vienna, 1994
- Treaty Banning Nuclear Weapon Tests in the Atmosphere, in Outer Space, and Under Water
- Vienna Convention on Civil Liability for Nuclear Damage, Vienna, 1963

== See also ==
- Action for Climate Empowerment
- Arms control
- Climate target
- Earth Negotiations Bulletin
- Environmental law
- Environmental organizations
- Environmental tariff
- International Network for Environmental Compliance and Enforcement
- List of climate change initiatives
- List of environmental laws by country
- List of environmental lawsuits
- List of international animal welfare conventions
- List of supranational environmental agencies
- List of treaties
- Wildlife Enforcement Monitoring System
