= Geography of Liechtenstein =

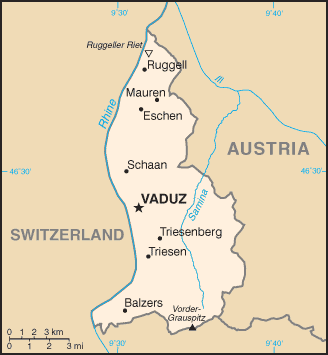
Map of the Principality of Liechtenstein

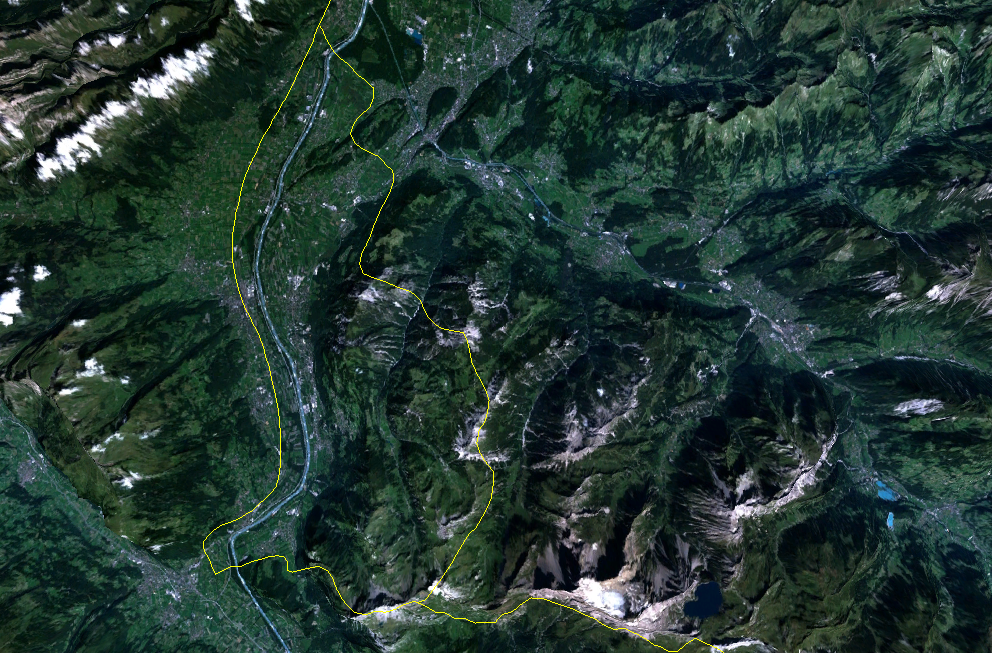
Satellite image of Liechtenstein area, with the border shown in yellow

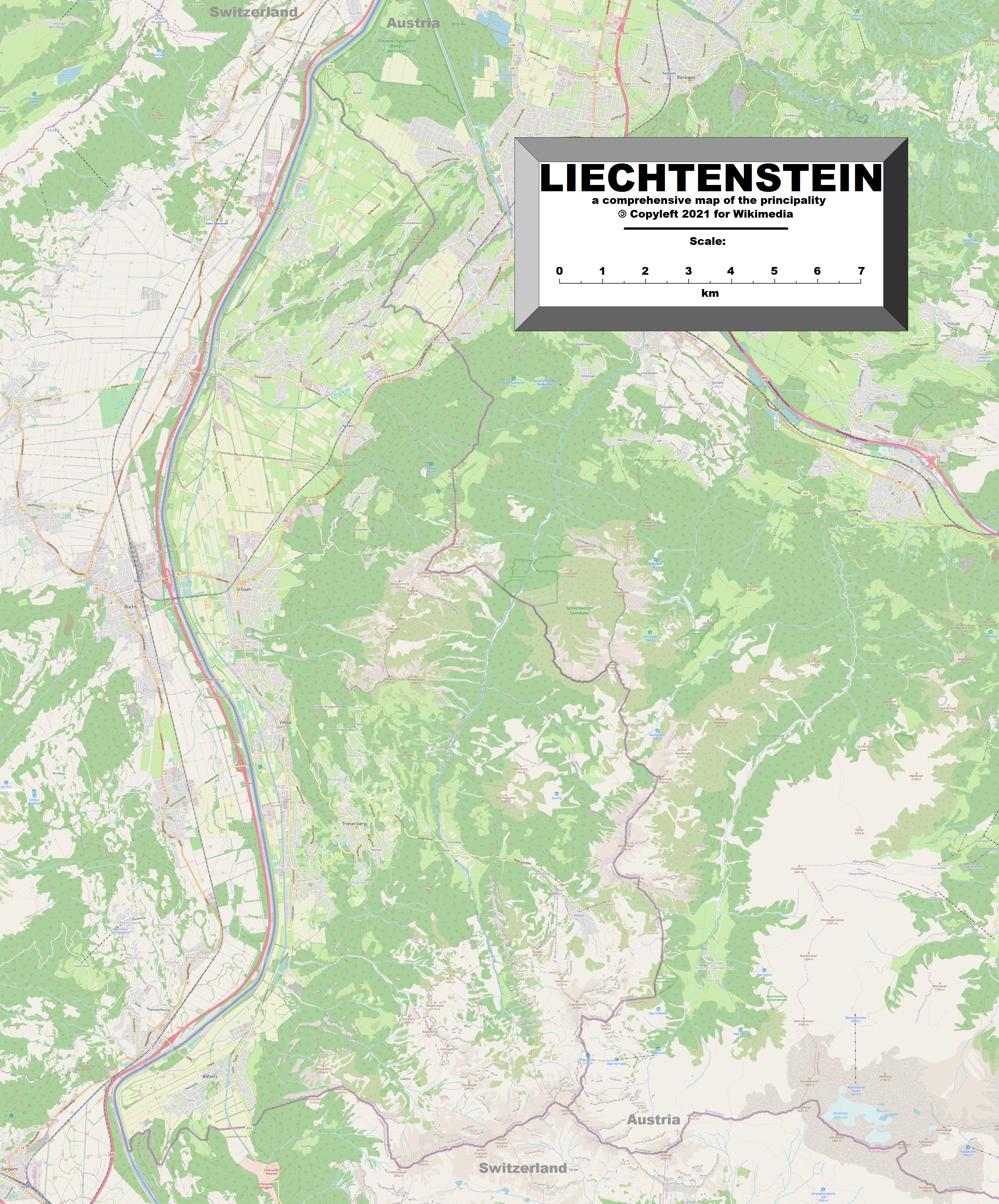
Enlargeable, detailed map of Liechtenstein

The principality of Liechtenstein encompasses most of the eastern half of the Rhine Valley, wedged between Austria and Switzerland. The majority of the country's population is found in the western half along the Rhine River. Along with Uzbekistan, Liechtenstein is one of only two doubly landlocked countries in the world.

== Statistics ==
Geographic coordinates: 47°10′N 9°32′E

Area: 160 km^{2} (land, 0 km^{2} water)

Land boundaries

total: 76 km
border countries: Austria 35 km, Switzerland 41 km

Lake

The only lake in Liechtenstein is the Gampriner Seele.

Land use

arable land: 21.88%
permanent crops: 0%
other: 78.12% (2011)

Terrain

Mostly mountainous (Alps) with Rhine Valley in western third

Natural resources:

Hydroelectric potential, arable land

Extreme points:

- North - river Rhine, Ruggell 47°16′15″N 9°31′51″E
- South - summit of Mazorakopf/Falknishorn (2,452 m), Triesen 47°2′55″N 9°33′26″E
- East - border post 28, above Nenzinger Himmel
- West - river Rhine, Balzers 47°3′46″N 9°28′18″E
- highest - Vorder Grauspitz (2,599 m), Triesen 47°3′10″N 9°34′54″E
- lowest - Bangserfeld (429 m), Ruggell 47°15′57″N 9°32′14″E

== Climate ==
Continental; cold, cloudy winters with frequent snow or rain; cool to moderately warm, cloudy, humid summers, great variety of microclimates based on elevation.

== Environment - international agreements ==
Party to:

Air Pollution, Air Pollution-Persistent Organic Pollutants, Air Pollution-Nitrogen Oxides, Air Pollution-Sulphur 85, Air Pollution-Sulphur 94, Air Pollution-Volatile Organic Compounds, Biodiversity, Climate Change, Climate Change-Kyoto Protocol, Desertification, Endangered Species, Hazardous Wastes, Ozone Layer Protection, Wetlands,

Signed, but not ratified:

Law of the Sea
