= Boris Shcherbina =

Soviet Ukrainian politician (1919–1990)

- Борис Щербина
- Shcherbina in 1985

Deputy Chairman of the Council of Ministers
- In office 13 January 1984 – 7 June 1989
- Chairman: Nikolai Tikhonov; Nikolai Ryzhkov

Minister of Construction of the Oil and Gas Industries
- In office 11 December 1973 – 13 January 1984
- Chairman: Alexei Kosygin; Nikolai Tikhonov
- Preceded by: Aleksei K. Kortunov
- Succeeded by: Vladimir Chirskov

Personal details
- Born: 5 October 1919 Debaltsevo, Donets Governorate, Ukrainian SSR (now Debaltseve, Donetsk Oblast, Ukraine)
- Died: 22 August 1990 (aged 70) Moscow, Russian SFSR, Soviet Union
- Resting place: Novodevichy Cemetery
- Party: Communist Party of the Soviet Union (1939–1990)
- Spouse: Raisa Pavlovna Shcherbina
- Children: 1
- Occupation: Railway engineer
- Known for: Crisis management of the 1986 Chernobyl disaster and 1988 Armenian earthquake; Chairman of the Chernobyl Commission
- Awards: Hero of Socialist Labor

Military service
- Allegiance: Soviet Union
- Service years: 1939–1942
- Unit: 316th ski squadron
- Conflict: The Winter War

Boris Yevdokimovich Shcherbina (Russian: Борис Евдокимович Щербина; Ukrainian: Борис Євдокимович Щербина, romanized: Borys Yevdokymovych Shcherbyna; 5 October 1919 – 22 August 1990) was a Soviet politician who served as a Deputy Chairman of the Council of Ministers of the Soviet Union from 1984 to 1989.

Shcherbina was influential in the development of the oil and gas industry in Siberia, particularly in Tyumen Oblast. In 1986, he was appointed head of the commission set to investigate the cause of the Chernobyl disaster and oversee its management. Two years later, he was put in charge of handling refugees caused by the 1988 Armenian earthquake. Shcherbina retired in 1989, before dying in 1990. It is unknown how large of a role radiation caused by Chernobyl played in his death.

== Early life and education ==
Boris Shcherbina was born in Debaltsevo, Ukrainian SSR (now Debaltseve in Donetsk Oblast) on October 5, 1919 to the family of a Ukrainian railroad worker. He completed his secondary education in 1937. Further education was interrupted in 1939 when he volunteered to join the army and fight in the Winter War against Finland as part of the 316th ski squadron. After Shcherbina graduated from the Kharkov Institute of Rail Transport Engineers in 1942, he began working as an engineer on the Severo-Donetsk Railway during World War II. After the war, he graduated from the party school of the Central Committee of the Communist Party of Ukraine in 1948.

== Political career ==
Shcherbina had been a member of the Communist Party of the Soviet Union (CPSU) since 1939. Between 1942 and 1944, he was the secretary of the Kharkov oblast committee of the Komsomol, and he also worked in the apparatus of the Central Committee of the All-Union Komsomol between 1942 and 1943. Shcherbina then began working in Kharkov as a junior official before becoming a secretary of Kharkov's regional committee of the CPSU in 1950. Additionally, he was the second secretary of the Ordzhonikidze District Committee of the CPSU between 1948 and 1951. In 1951, Shcherbina was transferred to Irkutsk Oblast in Siberia where he became a secretary (1951-1956), and then the second secretary of the Irkutsk regional committee of the CPSU (1956-1961).

He was transferred again in 1961, this time to Tyumen Oblast in Western Siberia where he became the first secretary of the Tyumen regional committee of the CPSU between April 1961 and December 1973. Additionally, Shcherbina had been a member of the Central Committee since 1961 as a candidate member, and since 1976 as a full member. In Tyumen, he was responsible for the rapid growth in the oblast's oil and gas industry. Following the advice of experts, Shcherbina increased geological explorations in Tyumen in 1962 to unearth the region's oil and gas potential, with the results coming in not soon after confirming this potential. In the early 60s Tyumen produced 209,000 tons of oil and gas, in 1965 it was producing 953,000 tons. Around 1970, it was now producing 31.4 million tons. In March 1970, he made an unusual disclosure in revealing one of the largest oil fields in the world - the Samotlor field in Tyumen Oblast - through Sovetskaya Rossiya by reporting on its estimated reserves. He also worked to attract young people to Tyumen by constructing youth projects in relation to the Komsomol. He also oversaw housing projects to accommodate the flow of workers into the region, particularly in Surgut, where he prioritised providing enough space for workers and their families. During his time in Tyumen, Shcherbina personally worked hard and often criticised parts of the government for restricting certain construction projects, such as the construction of cultural and sport institutions in Tyumen.

On 11 December 1973, Shcherbina was appointed the Minister of Construction of Oil and Gas Industries, which he held up to 13 January 1984. As minister, he directed the construction of the Urengoy–Pomary–Uzhhorod pipeline connecting the Urengoi gas field in Western Siberia to Uzhgorod near the Czechoslovak border in Ukraine. For his role in hastening construction, Shcherbina was decorated with the title Hero of Socialist Labour and a few awards, including an Order of Lenin, on 6 October 1983.

On 13 January 1984, Shcherbina was appointed as a Deputy Chairman of the Council of Ministers under Nikolai Tikhonov. Alongside Shcherbina, Tikhonov had eleven other deputies. He held this position until his retirement on 7 June 1989. Additionally, he was Chairman of the Bureau of the Council of Ministers of the USSR for the Fuel and Energy Complex.

== Chernobyl disaster ==
At 1:23 am on 26 April 1986, the No. 4 reactor of the Chernobyl Nuclear Power Plant near Pripyat in northern Ukraine exploded, opening and exposing the uranium core. A few hours later, the Politburo of the Soviet Union became informed of the disaster. Soviet leader Mikhail Gorbachev and the Chairman of the Council of Ministers Nikolai Ryzhkov decided then to form a commission headed by Shcherbina. Shcherbina was at this point the Deputy Chairman of the Council of Ministers. As head of the commission, he was given the task of both investigating the cause of the disaster and remedying the situation. As Shcherbina was in Siberia at this time, he only arrived in Chernobyl late on the night of 26 April, almost a full day after the explosions. By the time he arrived, two other groups of experts had already been flown to Chernobyl.

A joint meeting between members of the commission and members of the Chernobyl district committee of the CPSU was held at 10:00 a.m. on 27 April, where Shcherbina and the commission announced that they would evacuate nearby residents the same day. According to The Washington Post, Shcherbina had initially rejected appeals for an immediate evacuation of the area from civil defence workers, citing "panic is even worse than radiation." He and other officials who arrived in Chernobyl were described as "absolutely incompetent" by Grigori Medvedev, former chief engineer at the No. 1 reactor in Chernobyl and author of The Truth About Chernobyl.

On 6 May, Shcherbina gave the first Soviet news conference on the disaster where he admitted that people living near the nuclear plant had been exposed to its radiation for 36 hours before evacuation, although he didn't state the levels they were exposed to. He also said that local officials had underestimated the size of the accident. This followed widespread foreign criticism of the USSR for its handling of Chernobyl. Although Shcherbina and other officials read out prepared scripts, portions of the conference, such as the possibility of cancer development following radiation exposure, were omitted when shown on Soviet television. In contrast to what he later said to the Politburo on 3 July 1986, Shcherbina said that Chernobyl met all Soviet and international standards. In June 1986, he submitted the commission's report to the Central Committee's Strategic Group containing the commission's findings in non-technical terms.

In a Politburo session on 3 July 1986 chaired by Gorbachev, Shcherbina presented the findings from the commission's investigation where he blamed both the staff of Chernobyl, but also the design of RBMK reactors. Excerpts of the session later published by the head of the Federal Archival Agency of Russia Rudolph Pikhoia disclosed Shcherbina's full presentation to the Politburo. At the session, Shcherbina reported the main findings of the commission's report. He began by laying the blame on the nuclear plant's leadership — the Ministry of Energy and Electrification and the government company SoyuzAtomEnergo — for creating a culture of carelessness and failing to learn from previous accidents. He then described the events that led to the disaster, including design flaws present in RBMK reactors where Shcherbina also reported that the commission found that the Ministry of Medium Machine Building, Kurchatov Institute, and the RBMK reactor designers held some responsibility for the disaster. He described RBMK reactors as being "incompatible with modern safety requirements.”

Two days later on 5 July, the USSR's official press agency TASS reported that the government had replaced Shcherbina with Deputy Prime Minister Vladimir Gusev as head of the Chernobyl commission amid rumours of Shcherbina's declining health and hospitalisation from radiation exposure. In September 1986, Shcherbina was present at the Soviet signing of two treaties from the International Atomic Energy Agency in Vienna in response to the Chernobyl disaster — the Convention on Early Notification of a Nuclear Accident and the Convention on Assistance in the Case of a Nuclear Accident or Radiological Emergency. At the signing, he declared that the USSR "will comply with both conventions.''

== 1988 Armenian earthquake ==
On 7 December 1988, a devastating earthquake occurred in northern Armenia. In response to the humanitarian crisis, the Soviet government formed a special commission to handle refugees in Armenia and Azerbaijan, and to give material aid to the region. Shcherbina was appointed as head of the commission.

== Personal life ==
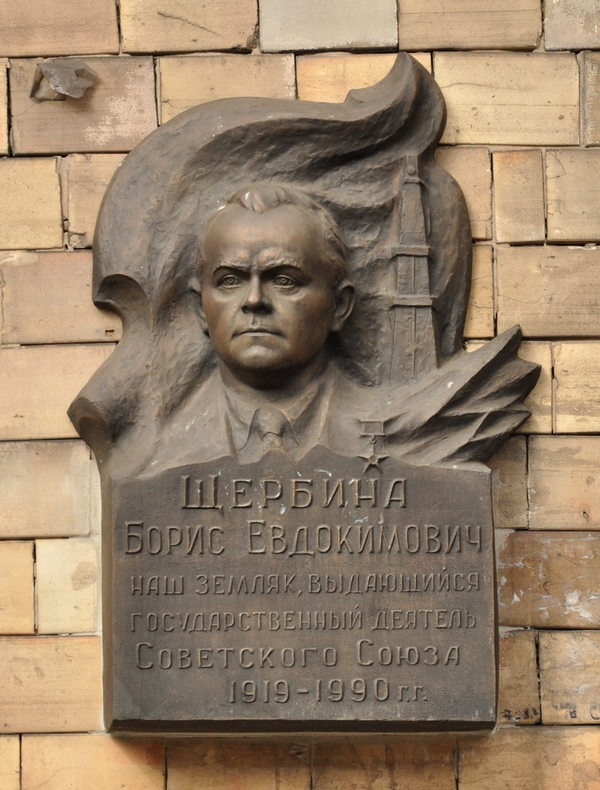
Commemorative plaque in Debaltseve, Ukraine.

Shcherbina was married to Raisa Pavlovna until her death in 1984. The two had one son, Yuri Borisovich Shcherbina. Yuri had a son, also named Boris, who then had a son of his own born 1989. He was also named Boris Borisovich Shcherbina and works as a fashion designer in Moscow.

Shcherbina was a workaholic during most of his life. In his free time, he liked to read scientific articles and books, and to play chess. Due to him suffering from asthma after developing pneumonia while in Northern Russia, Shcherbina never smoked or drank alcohol. According to his great-grandson, Shcherbina was described as having been a very calm and polite person who rarely got angry. Due to Chernobyl being a state secret, he did not talk much about his time or role at Chernobyl to his family. He retired from politics in 1989.

In 1990, he opposed the election of Boris Yeltsin to the chairmanship of the Supreme Soviet of the RSFSR, describing him as "a man of low moral qualities", whose election would "pave the way for the darkest period in our country's history".

== Honours and awards ==
In his position of Minister of Oil and Gas, he was awarded the honorific title of Hero of Socialist Labour in 1983 for major contributions to the development of the country's oil and gas industry, which was the highest award for achievements within the national economy. During his life, Shcherbina was also awarded four Orders of Lenin (1969, 1972, 1979 and 1983), the Order of the October Revolution (1971) and two Orders of the Red Banner of Labour (1957 and 1966).

== Death and legacy ==
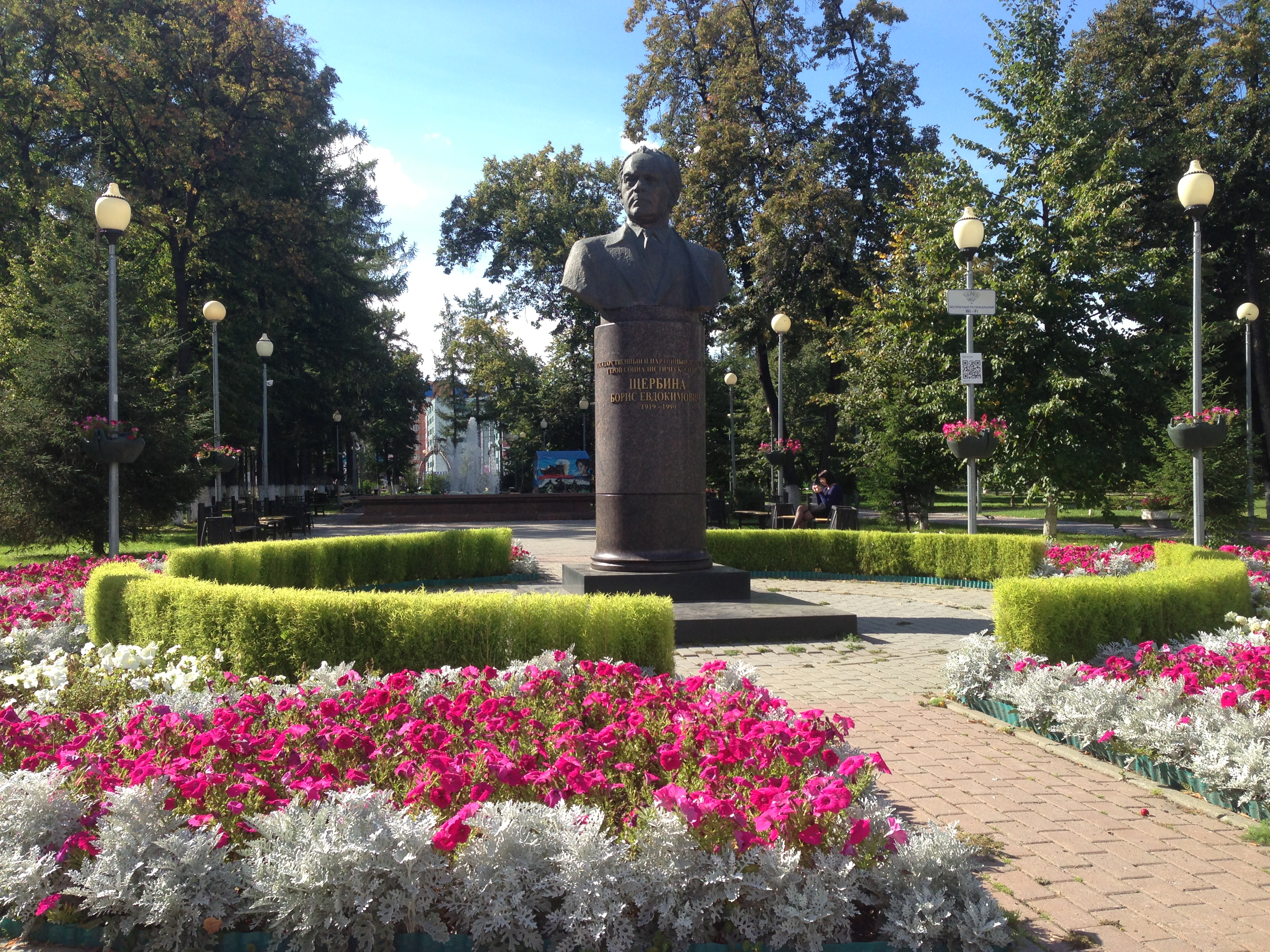
The bust of Shcherbina in Tyumen

Shcherbina died in Moscow on 22 August 1990, aged 70. It is speculated that his death resulted from a radiation-induced cancer caused by his work at the Chernobyl disaster site. Officially, however, it is unknown whether his death was related to radiation, as a 1988 decree that he drafted prevented Soviet doctors from citing radiation as a cause of death or illness. Prior to his death, Shcherbina had suffered from several heart attacks. He was buried at Novodevichy Cemetery in Moscow with his wife.

Shcherbina was posthumously made an honorary resident of his birthplace of Debaltseve in 2009, and of Gyumri in Armenia in 2003. In Tyumen, a boulevard was named in his honour in 2003, and on 10 November 2004, a bust of Shcherbina was erected in Nikolai Nemtsov Square in Tyumen, Tyumen Oblast. In Gyumri, Armenia, a street was named after him and a monument of him was erected. There also exist plaques dedicated to him in Moscow and Tyumen.

Shcherbina has been portrayed in multiple films and documentaries about Chernobyl. He has been portrayed by Vernon Dobtcheff in the BBC docudrama Surviving Disaster (2006), by Stellan Skarsgård in the Sky/HBO miniseries Chernobyl (2019), and by Vladimir Yumatov in the Russian Tv series Chernobyl (2022). The Soviet film Contract of the Century (1985) depicts Shcherbina, as portrayed by Alexei Presnetsov, during the construction of the Urengoy–Pomary–Uzhhorod pipeline.
