= Sulphur Emissions Reduction Protocol =

Sulphur Emissions Reduction Protocol may refer to:

- 1985 Helsinki Protocol on the Reduction of Sulphur Emissions
- 1994 Oslo Protocol on Further Reduction of Sulphur Emissions
