= Aarhus Protocol on Persistent Organic Pollutants =

1998 treaty

Map showing Persistent Organic Pollutants signatories (green) and ratifications (dark green) as of 2022

The Aarhus Protocol on Persistent Organic Pollutants, a 1998 protocol on persistent organic pollutants (POPs), is an addition to the 1979 Geneva Convention on Long-Range Transboundary Air Pollution (LRTAP). The Protocol seeks "to control, reduce or eliminate discharge, emissions and losses of persistent organic pollutants" in Europe, some former Soviet Union countries, and the United States, in order to reduce their transboundary fluxes so as to protect human health and the environment from adverse effects.

Authors and promoters of the Protocol were the United Nations Economic Commission for Europe (UNECE), which at the time housed 53 different country members and alliance. The protocol was amended on 18 December 2009: the Amendments to the Text and to Annexes I, II, III, IV, VI and VIII to the 1998 Protocol on Persistent Organic Pollutants came into force on 20/01/2022 and the Amendments to Annexes I and II to the 1998 Protocol on Persistent Organic Pollutants came into force on 26/02/2023.

As of May 2013, the protocol has been ratified by 31 states and the European Union.

In the United States, the protocol is an executive agreement that does not require Senate approval. However, legislation is needed to resolve inconsistencies between provisions of the protocol and existing U.S. laws (specifically the Toxic Substances Control Act and the Federal Insecticide, Fungicide, and Rodenticide Act). A recent scientific review highlights persistent challenges undermining the elimination of POPs. Factors discussed are delayed ratifications, high financial burdens for stockpile destruction, and a lack of a harmonized system.

== Substances ==
The following substances are contained in the CLRTAP POPs Protocol. The document focuses on a list of 16 substances that have been singled out according to agreed risk criteria (comprising eleven pesticides, two industrial chemicals and three by-products/contaminants). The Protocol assigned the arrangements for proper disposal of waste products deemed banned and limited, including medical supplies.

POP	Inclusion
Aldrin	Originally included
Chlordane	Originally included
Dieldrin	Originally included
Endrin	Originally included
Heptachlor	Originally included
Hexachlorobenzene	Originally included
Mirex	Originally included
Toxaphene	Originally included
PCBs	Originally included
DDT	Originally included
PCDDs/PCDFs	Originally included
Chlordecone	Originally included
Hexachlorocyclohexanes	Originally included
Hexabromobiphenyl	Originally included
PAHs	Originally included
Pentabromodiphenyl ether	Recognized
Octabromodiphenyl ether	Recognized
Pentachlorobenzene	Recognized
PFOS	Recognized
Hexachlorobutadiene	Recognized
PCNs	Recognized
SCCPs	Recognized

== See also ==
- 1998 in the environment
- Convention on Long-Range Transboundary Air Pollution
- Stockholm Convention on Persistent Organic Pollutants
- Environmental agreements
- International POPs Elimination Network (IPEN)
