= Tatiana Molcean =

Moldovan diplomat (born 1982)

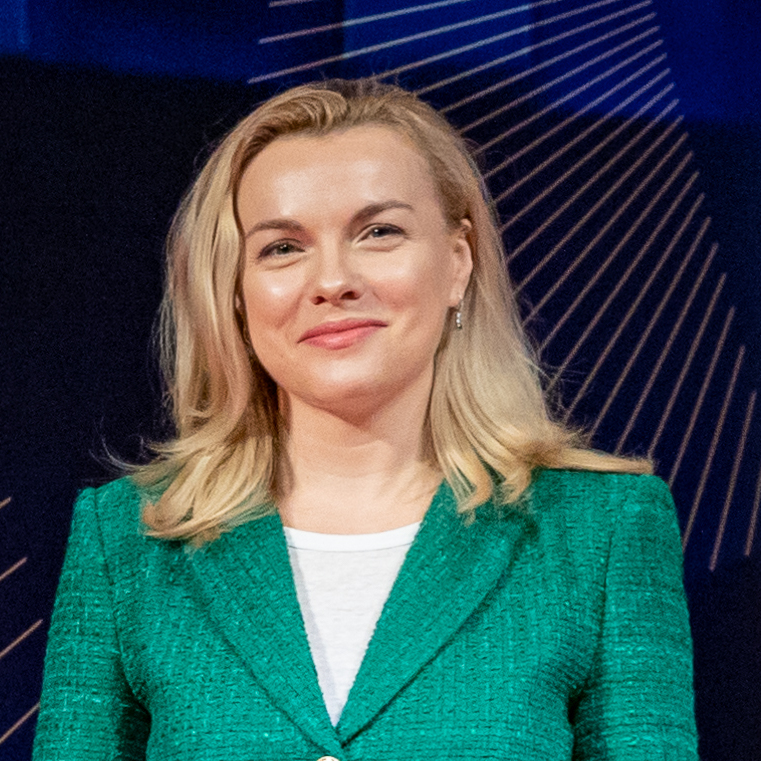
- Molcean in 2022

Under-Secretary-General and Executive Secretary of the United Nations Economic Commission for Europe (UNECE)
- Incumbent
- Assumed office 26 July 2023
- Preceded by: Olga Algayerova

Moldovan Ambassador to Switzerland and Liechtenstein; Permanent Representative of Moldova to the United Nations
- In office 30 July 2020 – 30 August 2023
- President: Igor Dodon; Maia Sandu
- Prime Minister: Ion Chicu; Aureliu Ciocoi (acting); Natalia Gavrilița; Dorin Recean
- Preceded by: Oxana Domenti
- Succeeded by: Vladimir Cuc

Secretary of State of the Ministry of Foreign Affairs and European Integration
- In office 7 November 2017 – 4 September 2019
- President: Igor Dodon
- Prime Minister: Pavel Filip; Maia Sandu
- Minister: Andrei Galbur; Tudor Ulianovschi; Nicu Popescu

Personal details
- Born: 25 September 1982 (age 44) Chișinău, Moldavian SSR, Soviet Union
- Education: Moldova State University; Geneva Graduate Institute
- Occupation: diplomat

Tatiana Molcean (born 25 September 1982) is a Moldovan diplomat who has been serving as the United Nations Under-Secretary-General and Executive Secretary of the United Nations Economic Commission for Europe (UNECE) since September 2023. She was appointed by UN Secretary-General Antonio Gutierrez, succeeding Olga Algayerova.

Before joining UNECE, Molcean served as Moldova's Ambassador to Switzerland and Liechtenstein and Permanent Representative to the United Nations Office, World Trade Organization, and other international organizations in Geneva. Prior to that she has held the position of State Secretary and Deputy Minister at Moldova's Ministry of Foreign Affairs and European Integration, following earlier diplomatic assignments focused on European integration and international cooperation. Molcean also served as Chair of the General Assembly of the World Intelectual Property Organization (WIPO) from 2021 to 2023.

== Early life and education ==
Tatiana Molcean was born on 25 September 1982 in Chișinău, then part of the Moldavian Soviet Socialist Republic (now Moldova). Raised in a family of economists she chose to study law, motivated by an interest in protecting human rights and contributing to social change. She initially aspired to pursue a career as a practicing lawyer.

In 2004, Molcean graduated from Moldova State University with a degree in international law. She subsequently attended the multilateral diplomacy program at Geneva Graduate Institute, Switzerland, which she completed in 2006.

== Career ==
=== Early career ===
From 2004 to 2008 Molcean was Head of the Division for Economic Cooperation and Sectorial Coordination at the General Directorate for European Integration. Molcean then served as Chargé d'affaires at the Embassy of the Republic of Moldova to Sweden from 2008 to 2011. Following this appointment, she served as Deputy Director General for Moldovan Integration in the European Union. In 2017, Molcean was appointed State Secretary and Deputy Minister for Multilateral and Bilateral Cooperation in the Ministry of Foreign Affairs and European Integration.

=== United Nations ===
Molcean served as the Permanent Representative of the Republic of Moldova to the United Nations in Geneva and the World Trade Organization, as well as the Moldovan Ambassador to Switzerland and Liechtenstein, from 2020 to 2023. During this period, on 5 October 2021 Molcean was appointed President of the General Assembly of the United Nations World Intellectual Property Organization (WIPO).

On 26 July 2023, Molcean was appointed the United Nations Under-Secretary-General and Executive Secretary of the United Nations Economic Commission for Europe (UNECE) by UN Secretary-General Antonio Guterres. In November 2023, she addressed the United Nations Special Programme for the Economies of Central Asia (SPECA) Summit in Baku, Azerbaijan, on the transit potential of the region. In 2023, she also commented that international climate change conventions, like the Paris Agreement, should be considered in planning to "promote carbon neutrality and accelerating energy transition."

In February 2024, Molcean supported the establishment of the world's first United Nations backed centre for circular economy research, which is based in the United Kingdom. In June 2024, Molcean visited Kyiv, Ukraine, to discuss UNECE support for Ukrainian socio-economic and environmental recovery from the Russo-Ukraine War ahead of the Ukraine Recovery Conference in Berlin, Germany, and the UN4UkrainianCities project.

In October 2024, Molcean moderated the fourth UN Forum of Mayors in Geneva, highlighting how mayors are at the frontline of many global issues and have the ability to contribute to the multilateral agenda. In November 2024, Molcean addressed the SPECA Summit in Tajikistan. In April 2025, Molcean addressed the Regional Forum on Sustainable Development 2025 at the UN in Geneva alongside the Deputy Secretary-General of the UN, Amina J. Mohammed, and the United Nations Development Programme Regional Director for Europe, Ivana Živković. She also attended the International Climate Forum in Samarkand, Uzbekistan.

Molcean has supported the International Gender Champions pledges against gender-based violence and for gender parity. She has also encouraged member states of the United Nations to join the Convention on the Protection and Use of Transboundary Watercourses and International Lakes (known as the Water Convention).

Alongside diplomacy, Molcean has promoted Moldovan cultural heritage, including organising an exhibition of traditional Moldovan hand-woven carpets at the Palais des Nations in Geneva.
