= Protocol on Heavy Metals =

The Protocol on Heavy Metals, a protocol to the Convention on Long-Range Transboundary Air Pollution, was adopted in Aarhus, Denmark, in 1998. As of 2004, it had 36 signatories. As of 2016, it had 35 signatories and 33 parties, with no country having become a signatory since 1998. The protocol addresses the reduction of cadmium, lead and mercury emissions in the interests of environmental protection. Amendments to the Protocol were agreed in 2012 to introduce more stringent emission limits but are not yet in force.

The protocol was established with the objective to control the airborne emissions of heavy metals caused by human activity. These heavy metals were susceptible to long-range atmospheric transport and capable of causing adverse human health effects, including cancer and chronic respiratory diseases. The protocol specifically targeted the reduction of heavy metals emitted from all kinds of industrial processes, including the emissions from fossil fuel combustion; iron and steel industries; primary and secondary non-ferrous metal industries; the cement and glass industries; the chlor-alkali industry, and the waste management industry, each of which were assigned specific emission limit values and emission control measures. These mitigation actions have contributed to the reduction of heavy metal emissions between 2005 and 2023 with cadmium emissions decreasing by 43%, mercury emissions by 57%, and lead emissions by 46% across the EU member states.

The Task Force on Heavy Metals was established in Executive Body Decision 2004/2 to review the scientific and technical aspects of heavy metal emissions, as required by the protocol to assess its efficiency. This task force would later by integrated into the Task Force on Techno-economic issues in 2014. Rather than solely focusing on heavy metals, the main objective of this task force focused on updating and assessing information on the reduction of a broad variety of air pollutant emissions, along with evaluating the costs associated with emission-reducing technologies.

Other protocols and global agreements that intertwined closely with the Protocol on Heavy Metals includes:

- The EMEP Protocol: Responsible for the collection of the emission data for a variety of airborne pollutants, including heavy metals, and the modelling of their atmospheric deposition.
- The Gothenburg Protocol: Responsible for the abatement of acidification, eutrophication, and ground-level emissions. Intertwined with heavy metals due to their ability to exacerbate acidification.
- The 1994 Oslo Protocol: Responsible for the reductions of sulphur emissions. Intertwined with heavy metals due to both of their emissions being sourced from the same industries.
- Minamata Convention on Mercury: A global agreement that focused specifically on the reductions of mercury.
