= Trans-European Motorways =

The Trans-European Motorways (abbreviated "TEM") are a project of the United Nations Economic Commission for Europe of sub-regional cooperation among Central, Eastern and South Eastern European countries regarding transport infrastructure. The Trans-European Railway (abbreviated "TER") is the twin project for the railway.

Its members are Armenia, Austria (associate member), Bosnia and Herzegovina, Bulgaria, Croatia, Czech Republic, Georgia, Italy, Lithuania, Poland, Romania, Slovakia, Slovenia and Turkey.

The TEM Project was established in 1977 and it is still an active program planning for the future.

Its main goal is to ease road transport in Europe, and to reduce differences between motorway networks.

The TEM network contains more than 25,000 kilometers of roads. 65% of these roads have reached the full motorway standard.

There is a coordinated master plan for the TEM and the TER.
