= Oľga Algayerová =

Slovak diplomat

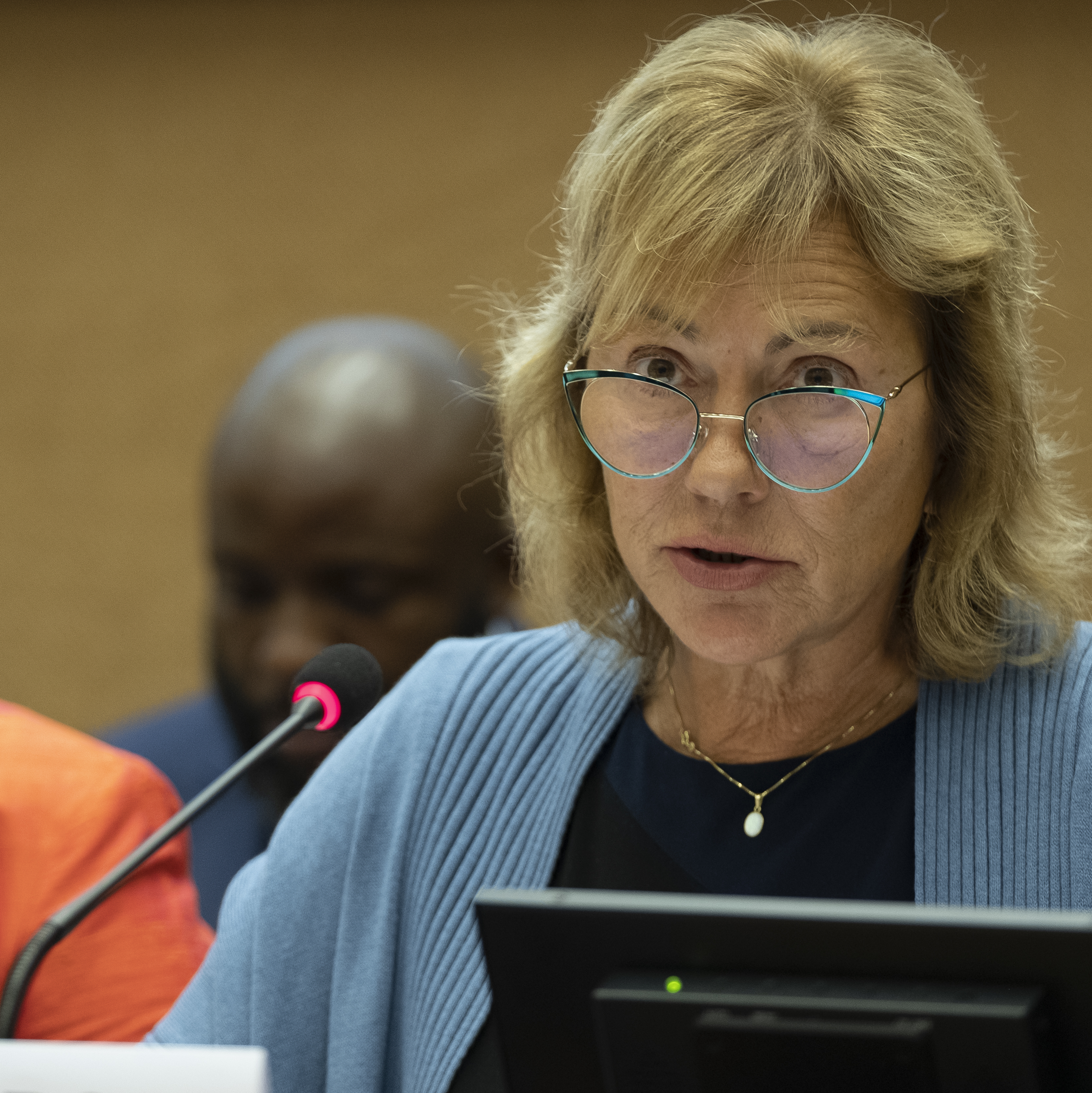
- Algayerová in 2019

Executive Secretary of the United Nations Economic Commission for Europe (UNECE)
- In office 2017–2023
- Preceded by: Christian Friis Bach
- Succeeded by: Tatiana Molcean

Personal details
- Born: 13 October 1959 (age 66)
- Education: Bratislava University of Economics and Business (Dip.); University of Malta (MA); Open University (MBA)

Oľga Algayerová (born 13 October 1959) is a Slovak diplomat and the former-Executive Secretary of the United Nations Economic Commission for Europe. She replaced Christian Friis Bach of Denmark.

== Education ==
Algayerová is an graduate of the University of Malta (MA in contemporary diplomacy) and the Open University Business School (Master in Business Administration), and also holds Engineer of Economy diploma from Business Faculty of the Bratislava University of Economics and Business.

== Career ==
Prior to her diplomatic career, Algayerová worked in the private sector as Corporate Export Manager at Zentiva International from 2004 to 2006. From 2010 to 2012, she held the position of President of the Slovak Millennium Development Goals. From 2006 to 2010, she was State Secretary in the Ministry of Foreign Affairs.

Before her appointment on 13 April 2017 by United Nations Secretary-General António Guterres, Algayerová was the Permanent Representative of Slovakia to the International Organizations in Vienna.

== Other activities ==
- International Gender Champions (IGC), Member
