= European Community Urgent Radiological Information Exchange =

The European Community Urgent Radiological Information Exchange (ECURIE) is the European early notification system in the event of a radiological or nuclear emergency.

The ECURIE system has two message types: an ECURIE Alert message, which implies an emergency notification under Euratom and an ECURIE Information message, which is a voluntary notification of smaller events and incidents. The possibility of sending ECURIE Information messages was introduced by the Commission in 2001. Since then, there have been more than 20 information messages.

In 1987, the European Council mandated an early notification and information exchange system that:

requires from the ECURIE Member States that they promptly notify the European Commission (EC) and all the Member States potentially affected when they intend to take counter-measures in order to protect their population against the effects of a radiological or nuclear accident. The EC will immediately forward this notification to all Member States. Following this first notification, all Member States are required to inform the Commission at appropriate intervals about the measures they take and the radioactivity levels they have measured.

All 27 EU Member States have signed the ECURIE agreement, as well as Switzerland, Norway and North Macedonia. Iceland, Montenegro, Serbia, and Turkey have also been invited.

ECURIE is operated by the DG ENER of the European Commission with the Joint Research Centre responsible for technical development.

== Usage ==
- The first ever activation of the ECURIE (European Community Urgent Radiological Information Exchange) system was after a loss-of-coolant accident (LOCA) in the Krško Nuclear Power Plant in Slovenia on 4 June 2008. The power plant was safely shut down to a secure mode after a leak in the cooling circuit. According to the Slovenian Nuclear Safety Administration (the country's nuclear watchdog agency), no radioactive release into the environment occurred and none was expected. The event did not affect employees, the nearby population or the environment. Slovenian authorities immediately notified the proper international institutions, including the International Atomic Energy Agency and ECURIE. The EU then notified (through ECURIE) the remaining EU member states, issuing an EU-wide alert. Several news agencies around the world then reported on the incident. Surprisingly, the Croatian authorities were not directly informed about the incident, although Croatia is part of the ECURIE system. Many Croatians heard the news first through foreign media and expatriates. Krško is located a mere 15 km from the Croatian border.
- After an iodine-131 release at the Belgian Institut national des Radio-Eléments in Fleurus, 29 August 2008.

== See also ==
- Convention on Early Notification of a Nuclear Accident
