= Christian Friis Bach =

Danish politician (Social Liberal Party)

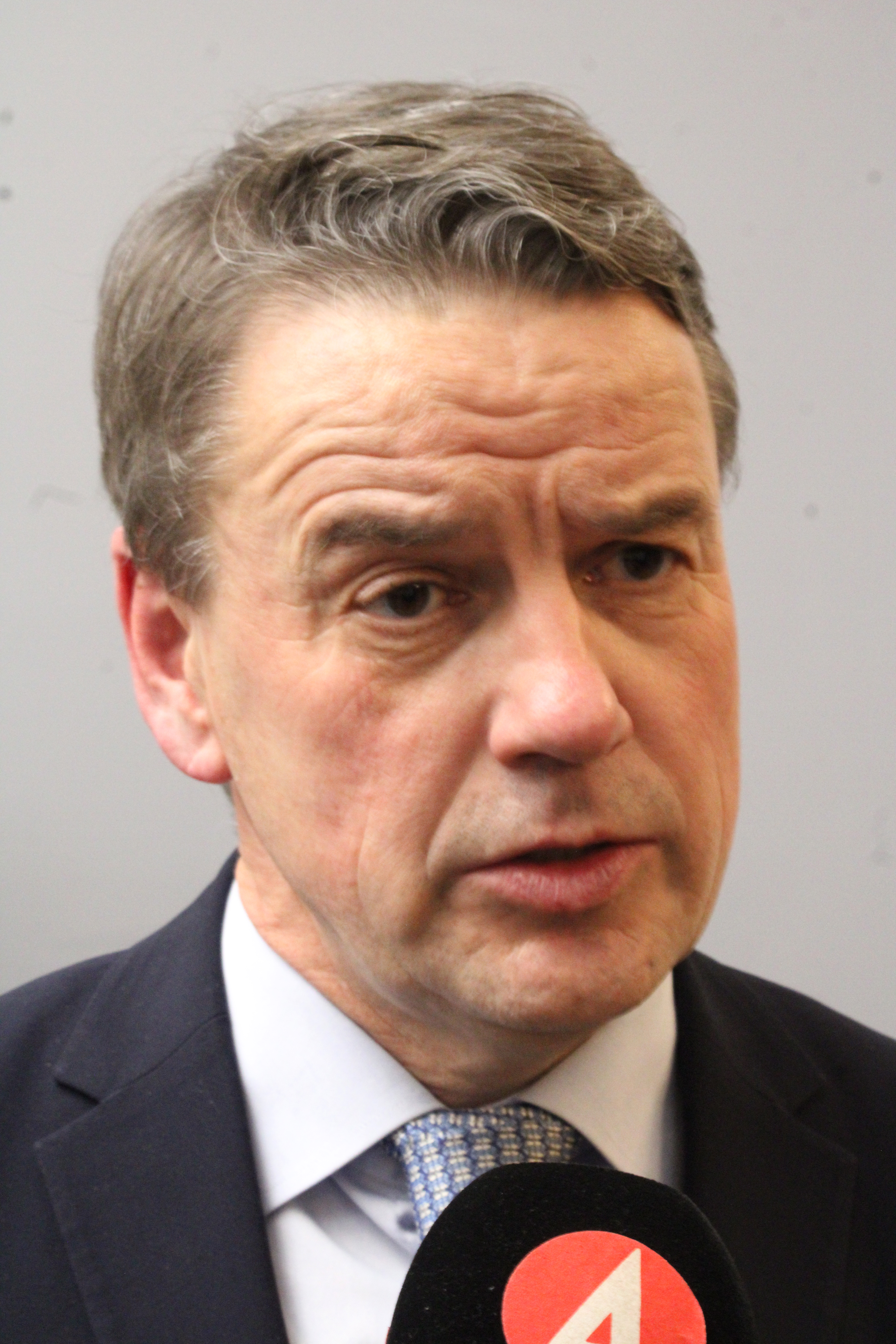
- Bach in 2026

Secretary General of the Danish Refugee Council
- In office 1 November 2017 – 24 April 2019

Executive Secretary of UNECE
- In office 9 July 2014 – June 2017
- Preceded by: Sven Alkalaj
- Succeeded by: Olga Algayerova

Minister for Development Cooperation of Denmark
- In office 3 October 2011 – 21 November 2013
- Preceded by: Søren Pind
- Succeeded by: Rasmus Helveg Petersen

Member of the Danish Parliament
- In office 15 September 2011 – 31 July 2014

Personal details
- Born: 29 April 1966 (age 60) Frederiksberg, Denmark
- Party: Venstre (2024-Present)
- Other political affiliations: Social Liberals (1980's-2024)
- Spouse: Karin Friis Bach (m. 1989)
- Children: 3
- Education: The Royal Veterinary and Agricultural University
- Website: Official website

Christian Friis Bach (born 29 April 1966) is a Danish author, lecturer and part-time farmer.

== Early life and education ==
Friis Bach was born in Frederiksberg in Denmark. He holds a PhD in international economics (1996) and an MSc in agronomics (1992) from the Royal Veterinary and Agricultural University (later merged with the University of Copenhagen). In 1991, he took a Supplementary degree in journalism at the Danish School of Media and Journalism.

== Career ==
Bach was Under-Secretary-General of the United Nations and Executive Secretary of the United Nations Economic Commission for Europe (UNECE) from 9 July 2014 until May 2017. He was previously a Member of the Parliament of Denmark and head of the Parliamentarian Group of the Social Liberal Party. He was Minister for Development Cooperation of Denmark (2011–2013) in the Cabinet of Helle Thorning-Schmidt.

He has been Honorary Professor of International Economics and Development at the University of Copenhagen (2009–2014), Assistant Professor in Development Economics at the University of Copenhagen's Institute of Economics (1996–1999) followed by six years as associate professor in International and Development Economics at the Royal Danish Agricultural University (1999–2005) (currently University of Copenhagen).

He was a special advisor to the European Commissioner Connie Hedegaard, in relation to the United Nations Global Sustainability Panel (2010–2011) and was a member of then prime minister Anders Fogh Rasmussen's Commission on Effective Development Cooperation with Africa, which held meetings between April and October 2008.

Bach has a long history with civil society, notably as the international director of DanChurchAid (2005–2010), as chairman of the Danish Association for International Co-operation (Mellemfolkeligt Samvirke) from 1997 to 2001 and secretary-general of the Danish Refugee Council from 2017 to 2019. He was one of the key drivers behind the Danish Fair Trade movement (Max Havelaar Fonden later converted to Fair Trade Denmark) in the early 1990s and helped to establish the Danish Ethical Trading Initiative and DanWatch. He also has private sector experience from running two start-up companies, Viewworld and Worldbarrow, and has worked as a journalist at the Danish Broadcasting Corporation.

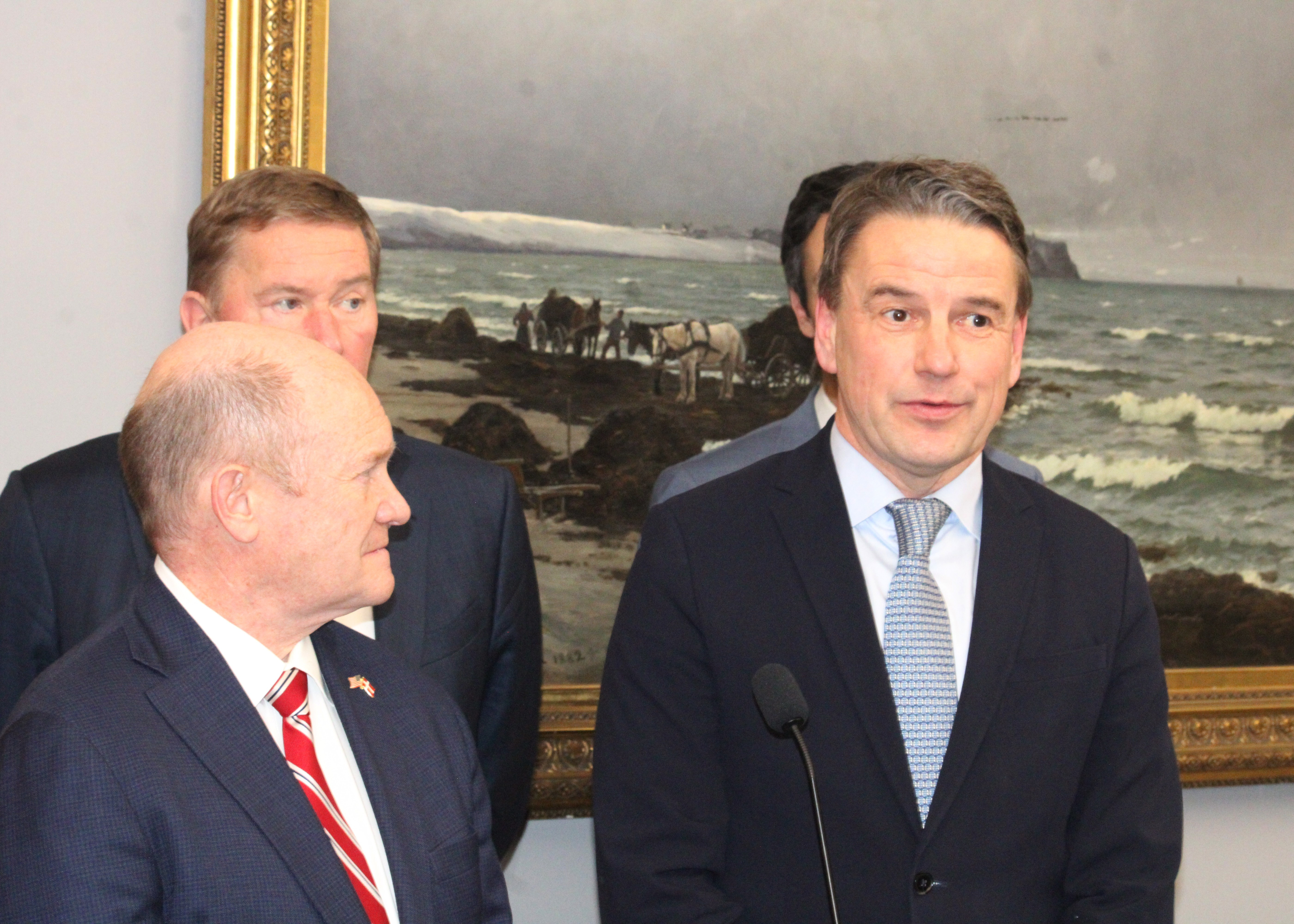
Friis Bach at a press conference at Christiansborg with U.S. Senator Chris Coons, January 2026

He has published a number of books and articles, both scientific and popular.

Bach has been married to Karin Friis Bach since 1991. They have three grown-up children (born 1991, 1993 and 1999). In their spare time, they run a part-time farm with cows and horses 25 kilometres (16 mi) from Copenhagen.

Political offices
Preceded by Søren Pind	Minister for Development Cooperation; 3 October 2011–21 November 2013	Succeeded by Rasmus Helveg Petersen
