= Vapor intrusion =

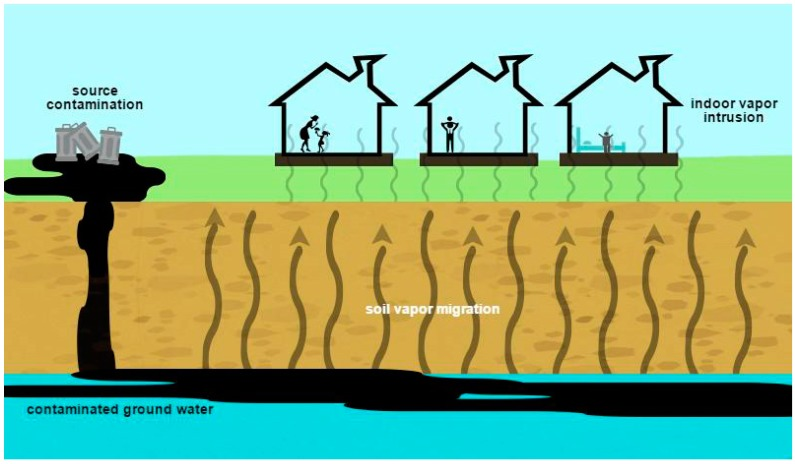
This graphic illustrates how vapor intrusion can affect humans and life in nearby areas where VOCs are being used. If not realized or handled, VOCs can have harmful effects on the health and wellbeing of nearby residents.

Vapor intrusion (VI) is the process by which chemicals, usually volatile organic compounds (VOCs), in soil or groundwater migrate to indoor air above or around a contaminated site. The process of VI has been studied more recently in relation to its effects on humans and the environment, and is becoming more regulated by the United States Environmental Protection Agency (US EPA).

== EPA ==
The United States Environmental Protection Agency defines vapor intrusion as "a migration of volatile chemicals from groundwater contamination or contaminated soil into an overlying building". The chemicals can be of different classes including volatile organic compounds (VOCs), certain semi-volatile organic compounds (SVOCs) and inorganic chemicals, such as elemental mercury, polycyclic aromatic hydrocarbons (PAHs), naturally occurring radon, and hydrogen sulfide.

== Process ==
Vapor intrusion is mainly caused by nearby chemical usage and improper cleanup of brownfield sites. This allows these chemicals to seep into soil or groundwater, and eventually end up in overhead building air. VOCs are most able to travel through porous soils because of the space it allows for the chemicals, and then diffuse in the vadose zone of soil, eventually to areas underneath manmade structures and buildings. Once under building foundation, the processes of advection and diffusion are responsible for the compounds traveling through cracks of the foundation until the gaseous compounds mix with the components of the indoor air. The ability of the compound to enter a building through advectio can be related to the pressure gradient of the soil versus the building, which is caused by the 'stack effect' of the foundation. "Preferential pathways" affect the process of vapor intrusion. Preferential pathways, such as elevator shafts, pipes, and storm drains, act as an easy path for VOCs to travel through via groundwater or soil gas, and enter a building through man-made entrances like vents and faucets. The usage of preferential pathways for vapor intrusion can be mitigated with well-kept sewer and pipe systems that do not allow contamination through cracks, leaks, and holes.

== Concerns and mitigation ==
Vapor intrusion can be a cause for concern when chemicals seep into areas of human residence or work. When these chemicals mix with the indoor air, they can lead to acute or chronic health problems, like headaches, mental status changes, and increased risk of certain cancers. Vapor intrusion can also pose a threat when an infiltrated building contains flammable materials, as many VA compounds can act as a catalyst to cause an explosion.

With this said, it is important mitigation strategies are put in place where there is high risk of VOC intrusion (within 100 feet of a contaminant). In 2012, the EPA released a "Citizens Guide to Vapor Intrusion", where different mitigation methods are explained. Two methods in particular are described, sub-slab depressurization, which entails using a fan to vent chemical vapors outdoors, and the over-pressurization of buildings, in which building pressure is increased to decrease the pressure gradient between under the building and the inside of the building. For larger buildings, an architectural mitigation strategy that is noted to decrease the likelihood of chemicals traveling into indoors is large, ventilated structures being installed under buildings. These structures, such as parking garages, will allow the gaseous chemicals to disperse in outside air rather than traveling directly indoors.

== History ==
In the United States, vapor intrusion is handled in individual states in different ways. Pathbreaking guidance on vapor intrusion was released by the New York Department of Health in 2006.

In June 2010, the American Society for Testing and Materials (ASTM International) released a commercial "Standard Guide for Vapor Encroachment Screening on Property Involved in Real Estate Transactions" (ASTM E 2600–10).

In 2002 the US EPA had issued its first draft guidance on the subject. The George W. Bush administration dropped the project in 2003, and only in 2013 did Obama's appointee as EPA Assistant Administrator in the Office of Solid Waste and Emergency Response make it a priority to complete the document. On June 11, 2015, the EPA released its final Vapor Intrusion Technical Guide, along with a Technical Guide for Addressing Petroleum Vapor Intrusion At Leaking Underground Storage Tank Sites. A guide is neither a statute nor a regulation, but a guidance.

== See also ==
- Brownfield land
- Inorganic chemicals
- Superfund for a list of Environmental Protection Agency Superfund sites
- Trichloroethylene (TCE) for a discussion of the chemical compound
- Volatile Organic Compounds
