= Ministry of Construction of Oil and Gas Industries =

Government ministry of the Soviet Union

The Ministry of Construction of Oil and Gas Industries (Minneftegazstroy; Russian: Министерство строительства предприятий нефтяной и газовой промышленности СССР) was a government ministry in the Soviet Union.

Created in 1972, this ministry was responsible for construction of pipelines, processing facilities and compressor and pumping stations.

== List of ministers ==
No.	Picture	Name	Took office	Left office	Time in office
1	Aleksei Kortunov	Aleksei Kortunov (1907–1973)	20 September 1972	18 November 1973 †	1 year, 59 days
2	Boris Shcherbina	Boris Shcherbina (1919–1990)	11 December 1973	21 February 1984	10 years, 72 days
3	Vladimir Chirskov	Vladimir Chirskov (born 1935)	22 February 1984	24 August 1991	7 years, 183 days
