= Permanent Representative of Moldova to the United Nations =

Permanent Representative of Moldova
- Flag of the United Nations

- Incumbent; Gheorghe Leucă since 18 November 2021
- Inaugural holder: Tudor Panțîru
- Formation: 1992

This is a list of the Permanent Representatives of Moldova to the United Nations. Permanent Representative is a head of the permanent mission of Moldova to the United Nations. The current office holder is Gheorghe Leucă, since 18 November 2021.

== List ==
- Tudor Panțîru (1992—1996)
- Ion Botnaru (1998—2002)
- Vsevolod Grigore (2003–2006)
- Alexei Tulbure (2006–2008)
- Alexandru Cujba (2008–2011)
- Vladimir Lupan (2011–2017)
- Victor Moraru (2017–2021)
- Tatiana Molcean (2020–2023, Permanent Representative of the Republic of Moldova to the United Nations in Geneva)
- Gheorghe Leucă (2021–present)

== See also ==
- Moldova and the United Nations
- Permanent Representative of Romania to the United Nations
