= Vladimir Chirskov =

Soviet politician (born 1935)

- Владимир Чирсков

Minister of Construction of Oil and Gas Industries
- In office 22 February 1984 – 24 August 1991
- Premier: Nikolai Ryzhkov
- Preceded by: Boris Shcherbina
- Succeeded by: Office abolished

Personal details
- Born: 24 April 1935 (age 91)
- Party: Communist Party

Vladimir Grigoryevich Chirskov (Russian: Владимир Григорьевич Чирсков; born 24 April 1935) is a Russian economist who served as the minister of construction of oil and gas industries between 22 February 1984 and 24 August 1991 being the last Soviet politician to hold the post.

== Biography ==
Chirskov was born on 24 April 1935. He graduated from the All Union Finance and Economic Institute by correspondence obtaining a degree in economics. He started his career at the Tyumazyneftesroy trust in the Bashkir Autonomous Soviet Socialist Republic. Then he served as a managing director of the Tyumen gaz mechanizatsia trust and headed the Glavsibtruboprovodstroy in the Tyumen Oblast. He was the first deputy minister of the construction of the enterprises of oil and gas industry between 1978 and 1984. Then he appointed as the minister of this institution on 22 February 1984 which he held until 1991.

Chirskov was a member of the Communist Party's central committee. He is the recipient of the USSR State Prize and the Soviet Ministers' Prize USSR.
