= Trans-European Railway =

The Trans-European Railway (abbreviated "TER") is a project of the United Nations Economic Commission for Europe of sub-regional cooperation among Central, Eastern and South Eastern European countries regarding transport infrastructure . The Trans-European Motorways (abbreviated "TEM") is the twin project for the motorways.

The TER project was established in 1990. There are 17 member countries: Armenia, Austria, Bosnia and Herzegovina, Bulgaria, Croatia, Czech Republic, Georgia, Greece, Italy, Lithuania, Poland, Romania, Russian Federation, Serbia, Slovak Republic, Slovenia and Turkey. In addition, a number of observer countries participate in certain activities of the project: Belarus, Latvia, Moldova, Montenegro, The former Yugoslav Republic of Macedonia and Ukraine Azerbaijani membership is pending, awaiting signature for accession.

In 2018 the development focus has turned towards high-speed railway lines. A master plan study has been already published.

There is a coordinated master plan for the TEM and the TER.
