= Nairobi Convention =

International agreement about conservation of the western Indian Ocean

The Nairobi Convention
Convention for the Development, Protection, Management and Development of the Marine and Coastal Environment of the Western Indian Ocean
- Official logo of the Convention
- Type: Convention
- Context: Marine conservation
- Signed: June 21, 1985
- Location: Nairobi, Kenya
- Effective: May 30, 1996
- Parties: Comoros; France; Kenya; Madagascar; Mauritius; Mozambique; Seychelles; Somalia; Tanzania; South Africa
- Languages: English; French
- Official website

The Nairobi Convention is a partnership between governments, civil society and the private sector, working towards a prosperous Western Indian Ocean Region with healthy rivers, coasts and oceans. It pursues this vision by providing a mechanism for regional cooperation, coordination and collaborative actions; it enables the Contracting Parties to harness resources and expertise from a wide range of stakeholders and interest groups; and in this way it helps solve inter-linked problems of the region's coastal and marine environment.

== History of the Convention ==
The Nairobi Convention, which was first signed in 1985 and entered into force in 1996, is part of UN Environment's Regional Seas Programme. The programme aims to address the accelerating degradation of the world's oceans and coastal areas through the sustainable management and use of the marine and coastal environment. It does this by engaging countries that share the western Indian Ocean in actions to protect their shared marine environment. The Contracting Parties (Comoros, France, Kenya, Madagascar, Mauritius, Mozambique, Seychelles, Somalia, Tanzania and the Republic of South Africa) to the Convention are part of more than 143 countries that participate in 18 Regional Seas initiatives.

== Implementation of projects ==
The Nairobi Convention Secretariat is implementing several projects within the Western Indian Ocean region, with support from the Global Environment Facility (SAPPHIRE and WIOSAP projects), the European Union (ACP-MEAs project), the Governments of Sweden (ocean governance project), France (NOCAMO project), and Norway, the German Federal Ministry for Economic Cooperation and Development (BMZ) (WIOGI), as well as several partner organizations.

Notable projects include:

- WIOSAP (Implementation of the Strategic Action Programme for the protection of the Western Indian Ocean from land-based sources and activities) Project: Aims to address land-based sources of pollution and protect marine biodiversity.
- SAPPHIRE (Western Indian Ocean Large Marine Ecosystems Strategic Action Programme Policy Harmonisation and Institutional Reforms) Project: Focuses on alternative livelihoods to ease pressure on marine resources, such as aquaculture of mud crabs in Madagascar and mussels in Mozambique.

== Summary of the Amended Articles of the Convention ==
The Nairobi Convention Secretariat held the Conference of Plenipotentiaries and the Sixth Conference of Parties (COP6) to the Nairobi Convention at the United Nations Environment Programme (UNEP) Headquarters at Gigiri in Nairobi Kenya, from 29 March to 1 April 2010, which considered and adopted the Amended Nairobi Convention for the Protection, Management and Development of the Marine and Coastal Environment of the Western Indian Ocean.

Amended Articles
Article 1: Geographical Coverage
Article 2: Definitions
Article 3: General Provisions
Article 4: General Obligations
Article 5: Pollution from ships
Article 6: Pollution caused by dumping
Article 7: Pollution from Land-Based Sources and Activities
Article 8: Pollution from Seabed Activities
Article 9: Pollution resulting from Transboundary Movement of Hazardous Wastes
Article 10: Airborne Pollution
Article 11: Biological Diversity
Article 12: Co-operation in combating pollution in cases of emergency
Article 13: Environmental damage from engineering activities
Article 14: Environmental Impact Assessment
Article 15: Scientific and technical co-operation
Article 16: Liability and Compensation
Article 17: Institutional and Financial Arrangements
Article 18: Meetings of the Contracting Parties
Article 19: Adoption of Protocols
Article 20: Amendment of the Convention and its Protocols
Article 21: Annexes and amendment of annexes
Article 22: Rules of procedure and financial rules
Article 23: Special exercise of the right to vote
Article 24: Transmission of information
Article 25: Settlement of disputes
Article 26: Relationship between the Convention and its Protocols
Article 27: Compliance and Enforcement
Article 28: Sovereignty Claims And Rights
Article 29: Signature
Article 30: Ratification, Acceptance, Approval And Depositary
Article 31: Accession
Article 32: Entry into force
Article 33: Withdrawal
Article 34: Responsibilities of the Depositary
Annex on arbitration

== See also ==
- Global Environment Facility
