= Multi-effect Protocol =

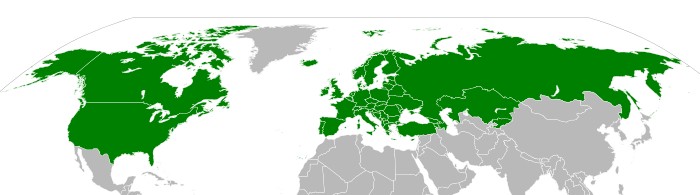
Map showing Convention on Long-Range Transboundary Air Pollution signatories (green) and ratifications (dark green) as of July 2007

The 1999 Gothenburg Protocol to Abate Acidification, Eutrophication and Ground-level Ozone (known as the Multi-effect Protocol or the Gothenburg Protocol) is a multi-pollutant protocol designed to reduce acidification, eutrophication and ground-level ozone by setting emissions ceilings for sulphur dioxide, nitrogen oxides, volatile organic compounds and ammonia to be met by 2010. As of August 2014, the Protocol had been ratified by 26 parties, which includes 25 states and the European Union.

The Protocol is part of the Convention on Long-Range Transboundary Air Pollution. The Convention is an international agreement to protect human health and the natural environment from air pollution by control and reduction of air pollution, including long-range transboundary air pollution.

The geographic scope of the Protocol includes Europe, North America and countries of Eastern Europe, Caucasus and Central Asia (EECCA).

On May 4, 2012, at a meeting at the United Nations Office at Geneva, the Parties to the Gothenburg Protocol agreed on a substantial number of revisions, most important are the inclusion of commitments of the Parties to further reduce their emissions until 2020. These amendments now need to be ratified by Parties in order to make them binding.

== Purpose and history ==
Because pollutants can be carried many hundreds of kilometres by winds, pollutants emitted in one country may be deposited in other countries. Deposition of pollutants in a country can far exceed the amount of such pollution produced domestically due to pollution arriving from one or more upwind countries.

In 1976, the environment ministers from the Nordic countries proposed a European convention on transboundary air pollution that emphasized sulphur compounds (Convention on Long-range Transboundary Air Pollution (CLRTAP)). After negotiations, 34 countries and the European Commission signed this Convention in 1979 in Geneva. The convention came into force in 1983, and has now been ratified by 47 European countries, two North American countries (Canada and the United States) and Armenia. The CLRTAP now includes eight protocols that identify specific obligations to be taken by Parties.

The Gothenburg Protocol was signed on 30 November 1999 in Gothenburg, Sweden, to support the CLRTAP. The Gothenburg Protocol entered into force on 17 May 2005.

== Protocol contents ==
=== Protocol elements ===
The following are the main provisions of the Protocol:

- Annex 1 - Critical loads and levels
- Annex 2 - Maximum allowable emissions (emission ceilings) are adopted for 2010 for sulphur, nitrogen oxides (NO_{x}), Volatile Organic Compounds (VOCs) and ammonia (NH_{3}). The selection of the specific emission levels (in tons/year) were based on the predicted effects of the pollutants and the pollutant control options and costs. Emission limits are set for each participating country. Those countries participating in the Protocol ("the Parties") with significant emission levels of the most harmful pollutants and whose emissions are relatively cheap to reduce must make larger emission reductions.

Following the revision of the Gothenburg Protocol, to which the Parties agreed in May 2012, Annex 2 will now also contain reduction commitments, expressed as a percentage reduction compared to 2005 emission levels, that Parties should meet in 2020.

- Annexes 4, 5, 6, 8 and 9 list 'limit values' for specific emission sources, such as for combustion plants, electricity generation, cement production or dry cleaning. Best available techniques are required to control emissions. With the exception of Annex 9, all the emission limit values specified were also updated in 2012 by the Parties.
  - Annex 4 is for sulphur from stationary sources
  - Annex 5 is for nitrogen oxides (NO_{x}) from stationary sources
  - Annex 6 is for Volatile Organic Compounds (VOCs) from stationary sources
  - Annex 8 is for fuels and new mobile sources
  - Annex 9 is for ammonia (NH_{3}) from agricultural sources

Guidance documents adopted together with the Protocol provide a range of abatement techniques and economic instruments for the reduction of emissions. Among the specific emission sources, the Protocol establishes NO_{x} emission limits for large stationary engines. Emission limits for new stationary sources should be enforced within one year after the date of entry into force of the Protocol for the party in question.

- Maximum sulfur content is specified for gas oil fuels (other than fuels used in vehicles) at 0.2% effective by July 2000 and 0.1% by January 2008.

The details of the Protocol are identified in a series of Annexes that address specific pollutants and emission source sectors (e.g. Annex V: "Limit values for emissions of nitrogen oxides from stationary sources"). The Annexes typically allow Canada and the United States to participate with different commitments than other Parties to the Protocol. This is due to the different regulatory nature of Canada and the United States versus most European countries.

=== Implementation and results ===
In the EU, the Gothenburg protocol is implemented through the National Emission Ceilings (NEC) directive.

Of all the countries that ratified the 1999 Gothenburg Protocol, most are expected to meet their obligations. Progress towards reducing sulphur emissions was greater than the Protocol commitments due to a widespread European shift from coal to natural gas as an industrial fuel in the 1970s and 1980s. As a result, the acidification of forests and lakes was halted in large parts of Europe. Reduction of NO_{x} emissions from traffic has less than originally expected. The Protocol required only modest ammonia emission reductions and therefore in most parts of Europe, excess nitrogen deposition will be reduced only by a small percentage.

It is predicted that the implementation of the Protocol in Europe will reduce sulphur emissions there by at least 63%, NO_{x} emissions by 41%, VOC emissions by 40% and ammonia emissions by 17% compared to levels in 1990. In addition, Protocol implementation in Europe will:

- reduce the area of excessive acidification from 93 million hectares in 1990 to 15 million hectares;
- reduce the area of excessive eutrophication from 165 million hectares in 1990 to 108 million hectares, and;
- reduce the number of days with excessive ozone levels by 50%.

As a result, it is estimated that human life-years lost as a result of the chronic effects of ozone exposure will be about 2,300,000 lower in 2010 than in 1990. In addition, there will be approximately 47,500 fewer premature deaths resulting from ozone and particulate matter in the air. Furthermore, the amount of vegetation exposed to excessive ozone levels will be reduced by 44% from 1990 levels.

However, for large parts of Europe, human exposure to particulate matter and ozone will remain higher than recommended by the World Health Organization. In the Benelux, the Po-area, Russia and Ukraine, the health risks will remain higher than for the rest of Europe. The East European countries that did not ratify the Protocol are expected to suffer from increasing air pollution. Because of the great potential for low-cost emission reduction measures in this region, increased related policy efforts are underway for countries such as Russia and Ukraine. Abatement of emissions from shipping and ambitious climate policy measures, offers possibilities to reduce air pollution in EU countries at relatively low costs. Additional concerns include the negative effects from the combustion of biomass and biodiesel on air quality/

== Revisions of the Gothenburg Protocol ==
In December 2007, efforts began to revise the Gothenburg Protocol. These revisions were concluded at a meeting of the Parties to the Protocol in Geneva in May 2012. The Parties agreed to include more stringent emission reduction commitments for 2020, including reduction targets for particulate matter (PM). Subsequently, the technical annexes were also amended to update them with improved emission limit values. The protocol now also includes, as the first international agreement between countries, measures addressing short-lived climate forcers, such as black carbon.

The work to revise the Protocol was coordinated by the Working Group on Strategies and Review and supported by varies technical groups, such as the Expert Group on Techno-Economic Issues.
