= Framework Convention on the Protection and Sustainable Development of the Carpathians =

Framework type convention for sustainable development

The Framework Convention on the Protection and Sustainable Development of the Carpathians (Carpathian Convention) is a framework type convention pursuing a comprehensive policy and cooperating in the protection and sustainable development of the Carpathians. Designed to be an innovative instrument to ensure protection and foster sustainable development of this outstanding region and living environment, the Convention is willing to improve the quality of life, to strengthen local economies and communities.

It aims as well at providing conservation and restoration of unique, rare and typical natural complexes and objects of recreational and other importance situated in the heart of Europe, preventing them from negative anthropogenic influences through the promotion of joint policies for sustainable development among the seven countries of the region (Czech Republic, Hungary, Poland, Romania, Serbia and Montenegro, Slovakia and Ukraine).

In 2001, United Nations Environment Programme / Regional Office for Europe UNEP/ROE was requested by the Government of Ukraine to service a regional cooperation process aiming at the protection and sustainable development of the Carpathian Mountains, a major transboundary mountain range shared by the seven countries. In response to this request, UNEP/ROE promoted an Alpine-Carpathian Partnership.

In 2002, during the UN International Year of the Mountains, the Alpine-Carpathian partnership has been initiated and launched by the Ministry of the Environment and Territory of Italy, at the time President of the Alpine Convention. Since then, UNEP/ROE serviced five negotiation meetings of the Carpathian countries.

At the Fifth Ministerial Conference "Environment for Europe" (Kiev, May 2003), the Carpathian countries adopted the Framework Convention on the Protection and Sustainable Development of the Carpathians consequently signed by all seven countries.
