= Convention on the Protection and Use of Transboundary Watercourses and International Lakes =

International treaty

The Convention on the Protection and Use of Transboundary Watercourses and International Lakes, also known as the Water Convention, is an international environmental agreement and one of five UNECE's negotiated environmental treaties. The purpose of this convention is to improve national attempts and measures for protection and management of transboundary surface waters and groundwaters. On the international level, Parties are obliged to cooperate and create joint bodies. The Convention includes provisions on: monitoring, research, development, consultations, warning and alarm systems, mutual assistance and access as well as exchange of information.

It was opened for signature in Helsinki on 17 March 1992 and entered into force on 6 October 1996. As of November 2022, it has been ratified by 47 parties, which includes 46 states and the European Union. It has been signed but not ratified by the United Kingdom.

== About the Convention ==
Some of the UNECE's water related problems are of water quantity and water quality, high water stress and overexploitation of water resources, increasing droughts and floods, contaminated water resulting in water-related diseases, etc. These issues are even harder to solve due to transboundary nature of the water sources in the UNECE region. More than 150 major rivers and 50 large lakes are either shared or are situated along the borders of two or more countries.

The Water Convention approaches its issues in a holistic way, equally emphasizing the importance of ecosystems, human societies and economies, and stressing the integrated water management instead the previously used focus on specific localized problems.

In 2003, the Water Convention was amended, allowing countries outside the UNECE region to join the convention, and thus benefit from its legal framework and experience; the amendment entered into force in 2013. This is especially beneficial for countries bordering UNECE region.

=== History of international agreements concerning transboundary waters ===
UNECE's records on transboundary water agreements previous to the Water Convention:

- in 1858 Austria and Bavaria signed the agreement concerning the regulation and management of the river Inn
- in 1863 Belgium and the Netherlands signed the treaty concerning the regulation of water supply from the Meuse
- in 1890 Germany and Switzerland signed the agreement concerning the hydropower station at Rheinfelden
- from 1909 dates the first and still existing agreement covering both water-quality and water-quantity issues, and setting up a joint body, between Great Britain and the United States of America relating to boundary waters between Canada and the United States

== Parties and signatories ==
State Party
Albania
Austria
Azerbaijan
Belarus
Belgium
Bosnia and Herzegovina
Bulgaria
Cameroon
Chad
Croatia
Czech Republic
Denmark
Estonia
Finland
France
Germany
Ghana
Greece
Guinea-Bissau
Hungary
Italy
Kazakhstan
Latvia
Lichtenstein
Lithuania
Luxembourg
Moldova
Montenegro
Netherlands
North Macedonia
Norway
Poland
Portugal
Romania
Russia
Senegal
Serbia
Slovakia
Slovenia
Spain
Sweden
Switzerland
Togo
Turkmenistan
Ukraine
Uzbekistan

Party: European Union

Signatory only: United Kingdom of Great Britain and Northern Ireland

== Implementation ==
At their second meeting the State Parties decided to help countries in establishing joint bodies, as required by certain provisions of the convention. Also, it was decided to facilitate cooperation between this and other UNECE conventions, and to examine difficulties arising when implementing the convention (administrative practices). At the fifth session of the meeting of the parties, a Guide to implementing the convention was adopted. A Guide offers commentaries to the provisions, and examples of good practices. In addition to that, an Assessment was made, to show the current status of transboundary waters. The Second Assessment covers more than 140 transboundary rivers, 25 transboundary lakes, about 200 transboundary groundwaters and 25 Ramsar sites or other wetlands of transboundary importance.

=== List of joint bodies in the European Union ===
- International Commission for the Protection of the Danube River (ICPDR)
- International Sava River Basin Commission
- Internationale Kommission zum Schutz der Elbe (IKSE)
- Internationale Commissie voor de Bescherming van de Maas (ICBM)
- Internationale Kommission zum Schutze des Rheins
- Internationale Kommissionen zum Schutze der Mosel und der Saar (IKSMS)
- Internationale Gewässerschutzkommission für den Bodensee(IGKB)
- Internationale Kommission zum Schutz des Genfersees
- Internationale Scheldecommissie (ISC)
- International Commission for the Protection of the Odra River against Pollution
- Interstate Commission for Water Coordination of Central Asia
- The Commission of the Republic of Kazakhstan and the Kyrgyz Republic on the Use of Water Management Facilities of Intergovernmental Status on the Rivers Chu and Talas

=== List of joint bodies in North America ===
- Great Lakes, St. Lawrence River and other transboundary waters shared by Canada and the United States: International Joint Commission (IJC)
- Great Lakes Commission (GLC)

== Convention Bodies ==
=== Meeting of the Parties ===
Meeting of the Parties is the main governing body of the Water Convention that reviews its implementation. It consists of all Parties to the convention. Other Signatories and States as well as non-governmental and intergovernmental organizations can participate as observers.

=== Bureau ===
The Bureau of the Meeting of the Parties makes arrangements to further develop the workplan, adapts it to changing circumstances and avoids duplication of efforts with water-related activities of other United Nations bodies and other international organizations. Is also takes initiatives to strengthen implementation of the convention.

=== Subsidiary Bodies to the Meeting of the Parties ===
The two Working Groups collaborate closely through cooperation on a number of joint activities. They hold one ordinary meeting per year.

1. Working Group on Integrated Water Resources Management The focus of this Group are the intersectoral activities related to the integrated management of transboundary water resources. Activities tend to prevent damage to the environment, promote the ecosystem approach in the framework of integrated water resources management, and ensure conservation and possibly, restoration of water-related ecosystems. Further efforts include promotion of the concept of payments for ecosystem services, prevention of accidental water pollution, and adaptation to climate change in the transboundary context, including floods and droughts management.

2. Working Group on Monitoring and Assessment The focus is establishing and implementing joint programmes for monitoring the conditions of transboundary waters, including floods and ice drift, as well as transboundary impacts. Also, this Working Group prepares periodic assessments on the status of transboundary waters and international lakes in the UNECE region. It encourages Parties to inform each other and the general public about any critical situation that may have a transboundary impact and to make available the results of water and effluent sampling.

=== Legal Board ===
The Legal Board was established in November 2003, to facilitate legal issues related to the work under the convention. The Legal Board has developed the Guide to Implementing the convention, together with the Working Group on Integrated Water Resources.

=== Task Force on Water and Climate ===
The Task Force is responsible for activities related to adaptation to climate change, including flood and drought management. In 2007–2009 they prepared a Guidance on Water and Adaptation to Climate Change which provides recommendations for the governments. The Task Force implements the Guidance through various pilot projects and a platform for exchanging experience.

=== Joint Ad Hoc Expert Group on Water and Industrial Accidents ===
This Group deals with prevention of the accidental pollution of transboundary waters.

=== International Water Assessment Center ===
The centre was established at the second meeting of the Parties (Paris, March 2000). It serves as an operational body of the Convention and its Provisions.

=== Implementation Committee ===
The objective of the Implementation Committee is to facilitate, promote and safeguard the implementation and application and compliance with the Water Convention. Established in November 2012, the committee is to be simple, non-confrontational, non-adversarial, transparent, supportive and cooperative, building on the collaborative spirit of the convention.

== Protocols to the Convention ==
There are two protocols to this convention:

=== Protocol on Water and Health ===
This protocol was negotiated in 1999. It is addressing the problems of water related diseases in the UNECE region, where one out of seven people do not have access to safe drinking water and adequate sanitation. Consequently, that brings diseases such as cholera, bacillary dysentery, coli infections, viral hepatitis A and typhoid. The implementation of this Protocol requires setting firm targets: the process of setting targets consists of analyzing the national situation, streamlining and harmonizing responsibilities and commitments in water and health. A State Party has to elaborate a realistic plan for improvement. This process helps focus the attention on the services and actions needed. Some of the areas of work of the Protocol are: small scale water supplies, water supply and sanitation in extreme weather events, water-related disease surveillance, equitable access to water and sanitation etc.

The Protocol on Water and Health entered into force in 2005. As of 2013, it has been ratified by 26 European states.

=== Protocol on Civil Liability ===
The Protocol on Civil Liability for Damage and Compensation for Damage Caused by Transboundary Effects of Industrial Accidents on Transboundary Waters was formally adapted at the Ministerial Conference "Environment for Europe" in Kyiv, Ukraine, on 21 May 2003. It was initiated by a first joint special session of the Parties to the Water Convention together with the Parties to the Convention on the Transboundary Effects of Industrial Accidents. Its aim is to give individuals affected by the transboundary impact of industrial accidents on international watercourses (e.g. fishermen or operators of downstream waterworks) a legal claim for adequate and prompt compensation.

The financial limits of liability as well as the minimum amount of financial securities have been agreed by all the actors of the negotiation, including the insurance sector, and are therefore realistic and appropriate. As of 2013, the Protocol has been ratified only by Hungary and is not in force.
