= Nitrogen Oxide Protocol =

1988 environmental treaty

Protocol to the 1979 Convention on Long-Range Transboundary Air Pollution Concerning the Control of Emissions of Nitrogen Oxides or Their Transboundary Fluxes, opened for signature on 31 October 1988 and entered into force on 14 February 1991, was to provide for the control or reduction of nitrogen oxides and their transboundary fluxes. It was concluded in Sofia, Bulgaria.

Parties (as of February 2020): (36) Albania, Austria, Belarus, Belgium, Bulgaria, Canada, Croatia, Cyprus, Czech Republic, Denmark, Estonia, European Union, Finland, France, Germany, Greece, Hungary, Ireland, Italy, Liechtenstein, Lithuania, Luxembourg, Netherlands, North Macedonia, Norway, Poland, Russia, Slovakia, Slovenia, Spain, Sweden, Switzerland, Ukraine, United Kingdom, United States.

== See also ==
- Convention on Long-Range Transboundary Air Pollution
- Environmental agreements
