= United Nations Economic Commission for Europe =

Specialized body of the United Nations

- Abbreviation: ECE
- Formation: 28 March 1947; 78 years ago
- Type: Primary Organ – Regional Branch
- Legal status: Active
- Headquarters: Geneva, Switzerland
- Head: Executive Secretary of the United Nations Economic Commission for Europe; Tatiana Molcean
- Parent organization: United Nations Economic and Social Council
- Website: unece.org

Map showing the member states of the commission

The United Nations Economic Commission for Europe (ECE or UNECE) is an intergovernmental organization or a specialized body of the United Nations. The UNECE is one of five regional commissions under the jurisdiction of the United Nations Economic and Social Council. It was established in 1947 in order to promote economic cooperation and integration among its member states.

The commission is composed of 56 member states, most of which are based in Europe, as well as a few outside Europe. Its transcontinental Eurasian or non-European member states include: Armenia, Azerbaijan, Canada, Cyprus, Georgia, Israel, Kazakhstan, Kyrgyzstan, the Russian Federation, Tajikistan, Turkey, Turkmenistan, the United States and Uzbekistan.

== History ==
The commission was first proposed in London in the summer of 1946 by the Temporary Subcommission on the Reconstruction of Devastated Areas.

The commission was established by the Economic and Social Council on 28 March 1947 in order to "Initiate and participate in measures for facilitating concerted action for the economic reconstruction of Europe," as well as to "maintain and strengthen the economic relations of the European countries, both among themselves and with other countries of the world."

It was established at the request of the United Nations General Assembly who called on the Economic and Social Council to create the commission, as well as the Commission for Asia and the Far East, in order to "give effective aid to countries devastated by war."

EE absorbed the function and resources of the European Central Inland Transport Organization upon its founding.

As the commission was established towards the beginning of the Cold War, it faced difficulties in achieving its mandate of economic reconstruction of Europe due to the Iron Curtain: separately the Organisation for European Economic Co-operation was established in 1948 in the west and the Council for Mutual Economic Assistance in 1949 in the east. The work of the commission had to concern itself only with questions that were of common interest to East and West, as to not cause confrontation. However, since the fall of the Soviet Union, the economic commissions of the United Nations have been expanding their activities in the former Soviet republics.

== Member states ==
The following are the member states of the commission, along with their date of admission:

Member states
Countries	Date of membership
Albania	14 December 1955
Andorra	28 July 1993
Armenia	30 July 1993
Austria	14 December 1955
Azerbaijan	30 July 1993
Belarus	28 March 1947 (Note: Belarus and Ukraine were already UN members in 1947, even though they were not independent.)
Belgium	28 March 1947
Bosnia and Herzegovina	22 May 1992
Bulgaria	14 December 1955
Canada	9 August 1973
Croatia	22 May 1992
Cyprus	20 September 1960
Czech Republic	28 March 1947
Denmark	28 March 1947
Estonia	17 September 1991
Finland	14 December 1955
France	28 March 1947
Georgia	30 July 1993
Germany	18 September 1973
Greece	28 March 1947
Hungary	14 December 1955
Iceland	28 March 1947
Ireland	14 December 1955
Israel	26 July 1991
Italy	14 December 1955
Kazakhstan	31 January 1994
Kyrgyzstan	30 July 1993
Latvia	17 September 1991
Liechtenstein	18 September 1990
Lithuania	17 September 1991
Luxembourg	28 March 1947
Malta	1 December 1964
Republic of Moldova	2 March 1992
Monaco	27 May 1993
Montenegro	28 June 2006
Netherlands	28 March 1947
North Macedonia	8 April 1993
Norway	28 March 1947
Poland	28 March 1947
Portugal	14 December 1955
Romania	14 December 1955
Russian Federation	28 March 1947 (Note: Joined UNECE as the USSR, then the Russian Federation took over its membership.)
San Marino	30 July 1993
Serbia	1 November 2000
Slovakia	28 March 1947
Slovenia	22 May 1992
Spain	14 December 1955
Sweden	28 March 1947
Switzerland	24 March 1972 (Note: In 1972, Switzerland was not a UN member. Switzerland joined the United Nations in 2002.)
Tajikistan	12 December 1994
Turkey	28 March 1947
Turkmenistan	30 July 1993
Ukraine	28 March 1947
United Kingdom	28 March 1947
United States of America	28 March 1947
Uzbekistan	30 July 1993

== Committees and programmes ==
=== Committee on Environmental Policy ===
The concern of UNECE with problems of the environment dates back at least to 1971, when the group of Senior Advisors to the UNECE governments on environmental issues was created which led to the establishment of the Committee on Environmental Policy, which now meets annually. The Committee provides collective policy direction in the area of environment and sustainable development, prepares ministerial meetings, develops international environmental law and supports international initiatives in the region. CEP works to support countries to enhance their environmental governance and transboundary cooperation as well as strengthen implementation of the UNECE regional environmental commitments and advance sustainable development in the region.

Its main aim is to assess countries' efforts to reduce their overall pollution burden and manage their natural resources, to integrate environmental and socioeconomic policies, to strengthen cooperation with the international community, to harmonize environmental conditions and policies throughout the region and to stimulate greater involvement of the public and environmental discussions and decision-making.

CEP is the overall governing body of UNECE environmental activities. The committee's work is based on several strategic pillars:

- Providing the secretariat to the "Environment for Europe" process and participating in the regional promotion of Agenda 21;
- Developing and carrying-out of UNECE Environmental Performance Reviews in the UNECE countries non-members of OECD;
- Overseeing UNECE activities on environmental monitoring, assessment and reporting;
- Increasing the overall effectiveness of UNECE multilateral environmental agreements (MEAs) and facilitating the exchange of experience on MEAs' implementation. See UNECE Espoo Convention, Aarhus Convention, Convention on Long-Range Transboundary Air Pollution, Convention on the Protection and Use of Transboundary Watercourses and International Lakes and Convention on the Transboundary Effects of Industrial Accidents.
- Participating and/or facilitating the exchange of experience in a number of cross-sectoral activities undertaken under the leadership of UNECE (e.g. education for sustainable development, transport, health and environment, green building), or in partnership with other organizations (e.g. environment and security initiative, European environment and health process).

=== Committee on Forests and the Forest Industry ===
The first task of UNECE after the Second World War was to coordinate reconstruction effort in Europe. Timber was crucial for construction, and energy, but the forests had been heavily overcut and production and trade were at a standstill. The ECE Timber Committee emerged from the International Timber Conference held in 1947 in Mariánské Lázně in the former Czechoslovakia.

The main pillars of the committee's activities have been: the collection and publication of the best available statistics on forests, wood production and trade; the exchange of information on forest working techniques and training of forest workers; periodic surveys of the long-term outlook on forests; technical work on the rational use of wood; reviewing forest product markets; and share experiences on forest and forest sector policy.

=== Committee on Urban Development, Housing and Land Management ===
In 1947, UNECE set up a Panel on Housing Problems, which later evolved into the Committee on Human Settlements and after the reform in 2005/2006 into the Committee on Housing and Land Management. The committee is an intergovernmental body of all UNECE member States. It provides a forum for the compilation, dissemination and exchange of information and experience on housing, urban development, and land administration policies; and in areas such as Birmingham, a more fiscal issue-UK.

In 2020, the CUDHLM created the Forum of Mayors at the Palais des Nations, an event allowing mayors from the UNECE region to exchange their best practices on urban development, housing and land management. UNECE is the first UN Regional Economic Commission to implement such an initiative that facilitates the cooperation between the UN, Member States and cities.

=== Inland Transport Committee ===
The UNECE Transport Division has been providing secretariat services to the World Forum for Harmonization of Vehicle Regulations (WP.29). In addition to acting as secretariat to the World Forum, the Vehicle Regulations and Transport Innovations section serves as the secretariat of the Administrative Committee for the coordination of work, and of the administrative/executives committees of the three agreements on vehicles administered by the World Forum.

Among other things, ITC has produced:

- 59 United Nations conventions concerning inland transport,
- Trans-European North-South Motorways, Trans-European Railways and the Euro-Asia Transport Links projects
- the TIR system (Transports Internationaux Routiers), a global customs transit facilitation solution
- transport statistics methods.

The World Forum services three UN Agreements:

- the 1958 Agreement on the approval/certification of Vehicles and its annexed UN Regulations,
- the 1997 Agreement on Periodic Technical Inspections (PTI) and its annexed UN Rules,
- and the 1998 Agreement on Global Technical Regulations and its annexed UN GTRs.

=== Statistical Division ===
The UNECE Statistical Division provides the secretariat for the Conference and its expert groups, and implements the statistical work programme of UNECE. The Conference brings together chief statisticians from national and international statistical organizations around the world, meaning that the word "European" in its name is no longer an accurate description of its geographical coverage. The Statistical Division helps member countries to strengthen their statistical systems, and coordinates international statistical activities in the UNECE region and beyond through the Conference and its Bureau, and the Database of International Statistical Activities. The Statistical Division develops guidelines and training materials on statistical methodology and practices, in response to demands from member countries. It works with different groups of specialists from national and international statistical organizations, and organizes meetings and online forums for statistical experts to exchange experiences on a wide range of topics. The UNECE Statistical Division also provides technical assistance to South-East European, East European, Caucasus and Central Asian countries.

The division also provides:

1. On-line data on the 56 UNECE member countries in Europe, Central Asia and North America in both English and Russian, on economic, gender, forestry and transport statistics.
2. A biennial overview of key statistics for member countries.
3. A set of wikis to support collaboration activities and disseminate information about good practices.

UNECE conducted the Fertility and Family Survey in the 1990s in 23 member States, with over 150,000 participants, with hundreds of resulting scientific publications. This activity has hence continued in the form of the Generations and Gender Programme.

=== United Smart Cities (USC) ===
The United Smart Cities programme is a joint effort between UNECE and the Organization for International Economic Relations (OiER).

Numerous private business entities and other international and European agencies support the programme, including Environment Agency Austria (EAA), the Royal Institution of Chartered Surveyors (RICS), UN-Habitat, and the International Society of City and Regional Planners (ISOCARP). The programme promotes areas of strategic smart city policy and development. The key focus areas as detailed by the programme are:

1. Urban mobility
2. Sustainable housing
3. Clean energy
4. Waste management
5. Information and Communications Technology (ICT)

=== Implementing Sustainable Development Goals ===
The UNECE has presented a set of Sustainable Development Goals (SDGs) priorities, which resulted from a mapping and prioritization of its existing activities against the goals. These consist of most SDGs except for SDG 10 (on reduced inequalities), SDG 14 (on life below water), SDG 1 (on poverty reduction), SDG 2 (on hunger), and SDG 4 (on quality education). The social dimension is mostly absent. This can be expected since UNECE does not include the “social” agenda in its name, unlike two of the other five regional commissions, namely UNESCWA (for Western Asia) and UNESCAP (for Asia and the Pacific).

The UNECE, with its long history of working on public-private partnerships, has taken the lead in introducing a format for public-private partnerships for the SDGs, called “People-Proof” public-private partnerships.

== Secretariat ==
The ECE secretariat has been characterized as a "strong" secretariat in 1957. The ECE secretariat was led by Gunnar Myrdal in its first decade. Myrdal refused efforts by the Soviet Union to dictate what staff would be employed in the secretariat. During this period, the secretariat sought to promote European integration efforts.

=== Executive secretaries ===
Years	Country	Executive secretary
1947–1957	Sweden	Gunnar Myrdal
1957–1960	Finland	Sakari Tuomioja
1960–1967	Yugoslavia	Vladimir Velebit
1968–1982	Yugoslavia	Janez Stanovnik
1983–1986	Finland	Klaus Sahlgren
1987–1993	Austria	Gerald Hinteregger
1993–2000	France	Yves Berthelot
2000–2001	Poland	Danuta Hübner
2002–2005	Slovakia	Brigita Schmögnerová
2005–2008	Poland	Marek Belka
2008–2012	Slovakia	Ján Kubiš
2012–2014	Bosnia and Herzegovina	Sven Alkalaj
2014	Denmark	Michael Møller (acting)
2014–2017	Denmark	Christian Friis Bach
2017–2023	Slovakia	Olga Algayerova
2023–present	Moldova	Tatiana Molcean

== Publications ==
Statistical Journal of the United Nations Economic Commission for Europe
- Language: English

Publication details
- History: 1982-2007
- Publisher: IOS Press (Netherlands)

Standard abbreviations
- ISO 4: Stat. J. U. N. Econ. Comm. Eur.

Indexing
- CODEN: SJUED4
- ISSN: 0167-8000
- LCCN: 84642632
- OCLC no.: 900948641

Links
- Journal homepage

From 1982 to 2007 the IOS Press published the Statistical Journal of the United Nations Economic Commission for Europe on behalf of the UNECE.

== See also ==
- OSCE
- UNECE Population Activities Unit
- United Nations Economic Commission for Latin America and the Caribbean (overlapping membership)
- United Nations Economic and Social Commission for Asia and the Pacific (overlapping membership)
- UN/CEFACT—Trade facilitation via standardised business communication.
- UN/LOCODE—location codes, maintained by UNECE
- International E-road network, numbered by UNECE
- World Forum for Harmonization of Vehicle Regulations
- Green card system—motor insurance scheme of UNECE
- International Union of Tenants (IUT)
