= Framework Convention for the Protection of the Marine Environment of the Caspian Sea =

The Framework Convention for the Protection of the Marine Environment of the Caspian Sea, commonly known as the Tehran Convention, is the first legally binding regional environmental agreement signed by all five Caspian littoral states: the Republic of Azerbaijan, the Islamic Republic of Iran, the Republic of Kazakhstan, the Russian Federation and Turkmenistan. Adopted in Tehran on 4 November 2003 and in force since 12 August 2006, it establishes an overarching governance framework for protecting the Caspian Sea from all sources of pollution and for the sustainable management of its resources.

The Tehran Convention Secretariat is administered by the UN Environment Programme (UNEP), hosted at its Europe Office in Geneva, Switzerland. Since its adoption, it has produced four legally binding Protocols covering oil spill preparedness and response, land-based pollution, conservation of biological diversity, and environmental impact assessment. A fifth Protocol on monitoring, assessment and information exchange is under active negotiation.

== 1. Background — the Caspian Sea and its environment ==
=== 1.1 Geography and physical characteristics ===
The Caspian Sea is a land-locked water body located on the border of the European and Asian continents and is the world's largest inland body of water. Its surface area covers approximately 392,600 km^{2} — comparable to the Baltic Sea (387,000 km^{2}) and larger than Japan or Germany — and its surface lies some 27 meters below mean sea level.

Based on morphological and geographical features, the Caspian is conventionally divided into three parts: the Northern Caspian (25% of the area, average depth only 4 m), the Middle Caspian (36%), and the Southern Caspian (39%, maximum depth 1,025 m). The main tributary is the Volga River, which provides approximately 80% of the water inflow, followed by the Kura-Araks (6.3%), Ural (3%) and Terek (2.5%) rivers.

=== 1.2 Ecology and biodiversity ===
The Caspian basin has been isolated from the world's oceans for millions of years, producing a high degree of endemism. The sea hosts more than 130 fish species including the Beluga sturgeon, making it the world's largest spawning ground for sturgeon. The Caspian seal (Pusa caspica) is the only marine mammal endemic to the sea. More than 100 species of waterbirds use the coastal wetlands as nesting and migration grounds, and rare lotus flower fields are found in the northern sections.

Today many Caspian species face severe threats from over-exploitation, habitat destruction, pollution and climate change. This decline has direct negative consequences for human well-being, social development and economic activities in the surrounding region.

=== 1.3 Human and economic dimensions ===
Approximately 14 million people live in the coastal provinces of the five littoral countries: Iran (6.5 million), Russia (3.9 million), Azerbaijan (2.2 million), Kazakhstan (0.8 million) and Turkmenistan (0.4 million). The dominant economic activities in the coastal and maritime zones are oil and gas production, commercial fishing, and shipping.

In accordance with Articles 7 - 11 of the Convention the Parties undertake an obligation to take measures to prevent, reduce and control pollution from the land-based sources, seabed activities, vessels, as well as pollution from other human activities including land reclamation and associated coastal dredging and construction of dams.

Convention also provides for appropriate measures to prevent the introduction into the Caspian Sea and to control and combat invasive alien species, which threaten ecosystems, habitats or species.

The Parties also take preventive, preparedness and response measures to protect the environment and human beings from consequences of natural and man-made environmental emergencies, cooperate in setting up early warning systems and ensure the availability of adequate equipment and qualified personnel for combatting environmental emergencies. The Parties also agree to carry out environmental impact assessments of hazardous activities capable of causing environmental emergencies or adverse effects on environment within their jurisdiction.

The Parties also undertake to ensure the protection, preservation, restoration and rational use of marine biological resources in the Caspian Sea; strive to maintain or restore populations of marine species at levels that can produce the maximum sustainable yield; prevent over-exploitation of marine resources and protect endemic, rare and endangered marine species and vulnerable ecosystems.

The 2003 Convention also provides for cooperation of the Parties in environmental monitoring, developing harmonised discharge and emission standards, conducting environmental research and development and exchanging environmental information.

A regularly convened Conference of the Parties and Secretariat were established by the Tehran Convention.

To date, the following four Protocols to the Framework Convention for the Protection of the Marine Environment of the Caspian Sea were drafted by Secretariat and discussed at the meetings of the Conference of the Parties:

- Protocol on Land-Based Sources of Pollution
- Protocol Concerning Regional Cooperation in Case of Emergency
- Protocol on EIA in a Transboundary Context
- Protocol on Protection of the Caspian Biodiversity.

The Protocol Concerning Regional Preparedness, Response and Co-operation in Combating Oil Pollution Incidents was adopted in Aktau, Kazakhstan on August 12, 2011.

The Protocol for the Protection of the Caspian Sea against Pollution from Land-based Sources and Activities was signed in Moscow, Russian Federation, on December 12, 2012 at the 4th Meeting of the Conference of the Parties to the Tehran Convention.
