= Waigani Convention =

Treaty regarding hazardous or radioactive waste

Convention to Ban the Importation into Forum Island Countries of Hazardous and Radioactive Wastes and to Control the Transboundary Movement and Management of Hazardous Wastes within the South Pacific Region
- Signed: 16 September 1995
- Location: Waigani, Papua New Guinea
- Effective: 21 October 2001
- Depositary: Secretary General of the Pacific Islands Forum Secretariat

The 1995 Waigani Convention is a treaty that bans the exporting of hazardous or radioactive waste to Pacific Islands Forum countries, and prohibits Forum island countries from importing such waste. The convention has been ratified by Australia, Cook Islands, Fiji, Kiribati, Federated States of Micronesia, New Zealand, Niue, Papua New Guinea, Samoa, Solomon Islands, Tonga, Tuvalu, and Vanuatu. It entered into force in 2001.

States that are eligible to ratify the convention but have not yet done so are France, the United Kingdom, Marshall Islands, the United States, and Palau. Palau has signed the agreement but has not ratified it.
