= Volatile Organic Compounds Protocol =

Treaty on atmospheric pollution

The Protocol to the 1979 Convention on Long-Range Transboundary Air Pollution Concerning the Control of Emissions of Volatile Organic Compounds or Their Transboundary Fluxes (known as the Volatile Organic Compounds Protocol or the VOC Protocol) is a protocol to the Convention on Long-Range Transboundary Air Pollution which aims to provide for the control and reduction of emissions of volatile organic compounds in order to reduce their transboundary fluxes so as to protect human health and the environment from adverse effects. The protocol was concluded at Geneva, Switzerland.

Opened for signature	November 18, 1991
Entered into force	September 29, 1997
Parties	(24) Austria, Belgium, Bulgaria, Croatia, Czech Republic, Denmark, Estonia, Finland, France, Germany, Hungary, Italy, Liechtenstein, Lithuania, Luxembourg, Republic of Macedonia, Monaco, Netherlands, Norway, Slovakia, Spain, Sweden, Switzerland, United Kingdom
Countries that have signed, but not yet ratified	(6) Canada, European Union, Greece, Portugal, Ukraine, United States

== See also ==
- Environmental agreements
- Vapor Intrusion
