= Convention on the Transboundary Effects of Industrial Accidents =

The Convention on the Transboundary Effects of Industrial Accidents is a United Nations Economic Commission for Europe (ECE) convention signed in Helsinki, Finland, on 17 March 1992, that entered into force on 19 April 2000. The convention is designed to protect people and the environment against industrial accidents, by aiming to prevent accidents from occurring, or reducing their frequency and severity and mitigating their effects if required.

The convention helps its parties (states or certain regional organisations that have agreed to be bound by the convention) to prevent industrial accidents that can have transboundary effects and to prepare for, and respond to, accidents if they occur.

The Conference of the Parties was constituted as the convention's governing body at its first meeting in Brussels on 22–24 November 2000.

The "Protocol on Civil Liability for Damage and Compensation for Damage Caused by Transboundary Effects of Industrial Accidents on Transboundary Waters" was adopted on 21 May 2003. This protocol is a joint instrument to this convention and the Convention on the Protection and Use of Transboundary Watercourses and International Lakes.

At its third meeting, in 2004, the Conference adopted an assistance programme to support the countries from Eastern Europe, Caucasus and Central Asia and South Eastern Europe in implementing the convention.

On 4 October 2022, Ukraine became a party to the convention.

As of November 2023, the convention had 42 parties, including the European Union, Russia, and most other countries in Europe, as well as Armenia, Azerbaijan and Kazakhstan. The treaty had been signed but not ratified by Canada and the United States.

== See also ==
- Environmental issues
