= Convention on Long-Range Transboundary Air Pollution =

1979 environmental treaty

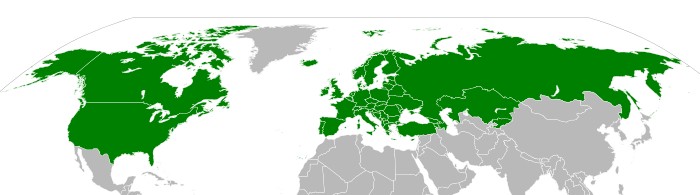
Map showing Convention on Long-Range Transboundary Air Pollution signatories (green) and ratifications (dark green) as of July 2007

The Convention on Long-Range Transboundary Air Pollution, often abbreviated as Air Convention or CLRTAP, is intended to protect the human environment against air pollution and to gradually reduce and prevent air pollution, including long-range transboundary air pollution. It is implemented by the European Monitoring and Evaluation Programme (EMEP), directed by the United Nations Economic Commission for Europe (UNECE).

The convention opened for signature on November 13, 1979, and entered into force on March 16, 1983.

== Secretariat ==
The Convention, which now has 51 Parties, identifies the Executive Secretary of the United Nations Economic Commission for Europe (UNECE) as its secretariat. The current parties to the Convention are shown on the map.

The Convention is implemented by the European Monitoring and Evaluation Programme (EMEP) (short for Co-operative Programme for Monitoring and Evaluation of the Long-range Transmission of Air Pollutants in Europe). Results of the EMEP programme are published on the EMEP website, www.emep.int.

== Procedure ==
The aim of the Convention is that Parties shall endeavour to limit and, as far as possible, gradually reduce and prevent air pollution including long-range transboundary air pollution. Parties develop policies and strategies to combat the discharge of air pollutants through exchanges of information, consultation, research and monitoring.

The Parties meet annually at sessions of the Executive Body to review ongoing work and plan future activities including a workplan for the coming year. The three main subsidiary bodies – the Working Group on Effects, the Steering Body to EMEP and the Working Group on Strategies and Review – as well as the Convention's Implementation Committee, report to the Executive Body each year.

Currently, the Convention's priority activities include review and possible revision of its most recent protocols, implementation of the Convention and its protocols across the entire UNECE region (with special focus on Eastern Europe, the Caucasus and Central Asia and South-East Europe) and sharing its knowledge and information with other regions of the world.

== Protocols ==
Since 1979 the Convention on Long-range Transboundary Air Pollution has addressed some of the major environmental problems of the UNECE region through scientific collaboration and policy negotiation. The Convention has been extended by eight protocols that identify specific measures to be taken by Parties to cut their emissions of air pollutants:

- Protocol on Long-Term Financing of the Cooperative Programme for Monitoring and Evaluation of the Long-range Transmission of Air Pollutants in Europe (EMEP) (1984)
- 1985 Helsinki Protocol on the Reduction of Sulphur Emissions
- Nitrogen Oxide Protocol (1988)
- Volatile Organic Compounds Protocol (1991)
- 1994 Oslo Protocol on Further Reduction of Sulphur Emissions
- Protocol on Heavy Metals (1998)
- Aarhus Protocol on Persistent Organic Pollutants (1998)
- 1999 Gothenburg Protocol to Abate Acidification, Eutrophication and Ground-level Ozone (1999)

== See also ==
- Aarhus Protocol on Persistent Organic Pollutants
- Protocol on Heavy Metals
- Critical load
- International environmental agreements
- Gothenburg (Multi-effect) Protocol
- 1985 Helsinki Protocol on the Reduction of Sulphur Emissions
- 1994 Oslo Protocol on Further Reduction of Sulphur Emissions
- Volatile Organic Compounds Protocol
- CIA World Factbook, as of 2003 edition
