= 1994 Oslo Protocol on Further Reduction of Sulphur Emissions =

The Protocol to the 1979 Convention on Long-Range Transboundary Air Pollution on Further Reduction of Sulphur Emissions is an agreement to provide for a further reduction in sulphur emissions or transboundary fluxes. It is a protocol to the Convention on Long-Range Transboundary Air Pollution and supplements the 1985 Helsinki Protocol on the Reduction of Sulphur Emissions.

opened for signature - 14 June 1994

entered into force - 5 August 1998

parties - (29) Austria, Belgium, Bulgaria, Canada, Croatia, Cyprus, Czech Republic, Denmark, European Union, Finland, France, Germany, Greece, Hungary, Ireland, Italy, Liechtenstein, Lithuania, Luxembourg, Republic of Macedonia, Monaco, Netherlands, Norway, Slovakia, Slovenia, Spain, Sweden, Switzerland, United Kingdom

countries that have signed, but not yet ratified - (3) Poland, Russia, Ukraine
