= Convention on Early Notification of a Nuclear Accident =

1986 international treaty

- Signed: 26 September 1986
- Location: Vienna, Austria
- Effective: 27 October 1986
- Condition: Three ratifications
- Signatories: 69
- Parties: 127
- Depositary: Director General of the International Atomic Energy Agency
- Languages: Arabic, Chinese, English, French, Russian, and Spanish

The Convention on Early Notification of a Nuclear Accident is a 1986 International Atomic Energy Agency (IAEA) treaty whereby states have agreed to provide notification of any nuclear accident that occur within its jurisdiction that could affect other states. It, along with the Convention on Assistance in the Case of a Nuclear Accident or Radiological Emergency, was adopted in direct response to the April 1986 Chernobyl disaster.

By agreeing to the convention, a state acknowledges that when any nuclear or radiation accident occurs within its territory that has the potential of affecting another state, it will promptly notify the IAEA and the other states that could be affected. The information to be reported includes the incident's time, location, and the suspected amount of radioactivity release.

The convention was concluded and signed at a special session of the IAEA general conference on 26 September 1986; the special session was called because of the Chernobyl disaster, which had occurred five months before. Significantly, the Soviet Union and the Ukrainian SSR—the states that were responsible for the Chernobyl disaster—both signed the treaty at the conference and quickly ratified it. It was signed by 69 states and the Convention entered into force on 27 October 1986 after the third ratification.

As of 2021, 115 state parties are full participants in the convention, along with the European Atomic Energy Community, the Food and Agriculture Organization, the World Health Organization, and the World Meteorological Organization. A further 8 states have signed the treaty but not ratified it - Afghanistan, Democratic Republic of the Congo, Holy See, Niger, North Korea, Sierra Leone, Sudan, and Zimbabwe.

== Technical Implementation ==
To implement the agreement, the IAEA operates the web portal USIE. National competent authorities can use this web portal to fulfill their information and reporting obligations in case of an emergency. Alternative reporting methods and a description of further details are outlined in the corresponding IAEA Operations Manual for Incident and Emergency Communication.

== See also ==
- European Community Urgent Radiological Information Exchange
