= Convention on Assistance in the Case of a Nuclear Accident or Radiological Emergency =

1986 treaty

- Signed: 26 September 1986
- Location: Vienna, Austria
- Effective: 26 February 1987
- Condition: Three ratifications
- Signatories: 68
- Parties: 112 (four have denounced)
- Depositary: Director General of the International Atomic Energy Agency
- Languages: Arabic, Chinese, English, French, Russian, and Spanish

The Convention on Assistance in the Case of a Nuclear Accident or Radiological Emergency is a 1986 treaty of the International Atomic Energy Agency (IAEA) whereby states have agreed to provide notification to the IAEA of any assistance that they can provide in the case of a nuclear accident that occurs in another state that has ratified the treaty. Along with the Convention on Early Notification of a Nuclear Accident, it was adopted in direct response to the April 1986 Chernobyl disaster.

The convention was concluded and signed at a special session of the IAEA general conference on 26 September 1986; the special session was called because of the Chernobyl disaster, which had occurred five months before. Significantly, the Soviet Union and the Ukrainian SSR—the states that were responsible for the Chernobyl disaster—both signed the treaty at the conference and quickly ratified it. It was signed by 68 states and the Convention entered into force on 26 February 1987 after the third ratification.

As of 2016, there are 112 states that have ratified or acceded to the convention, plus the European Atomic Energy Community, the Food and Agriculture Organization, the World Health Organization, and the World Meteorological Organization. The states that have signed the convention but not ratified it are Afghanistan, Côte d'Ivoire, Democratic Republic of the Congo, Holy See, Niger, North Korea, Sierra Leone, Sudan, Syria, and Zimbabwe. The states that have ratified the convention but have since denounced it and withdrawn from the agreement are Bulgaria, Hungary, Mongolia, and Poland.
