= 1985 Helsinki Protocol on the Reduction of Sulphur Emissions =

Protocol to reduce sulfur emissions

The Protocol to the 1979 Convention on Long-Range Transboundary Air Pollution on the Reduction of Sulphur Emissions or their Transboundary Fluxes by at least 30 per cent is a 1985 protocol to the Convention on Long-Range Transboundary Air Pollution agreement that provided for a 30 per cent reduction in sulphur emissions or transboundary fluxes by 1993. The protocol has been supplemented by the 1994 Oslo Protocol on Further Reduction of Sulphur Emissions. By 1993, most of the countries that participated in the agreement reported reaching the goal and some countries reported even greater sulphur reductions.

opened for signature - July 8, 1985

entered into force - September 2, 1987

parties - (25) Albania, Austria, Belarus, Belgium, Bulgaria, Canada, Czech Republic, Denmark, Estonia, Finland, France, Germany, Hungary, Italy, Liechtenstein, Lithuania, Luxembourg, Netherlands, North Macedonia, Norway, Russia, Slovakia, Sweden, Switzerland, Ukraine

== See also ==
- United Nations Interim Force in Lebanon
