= Outline of the United Nations =

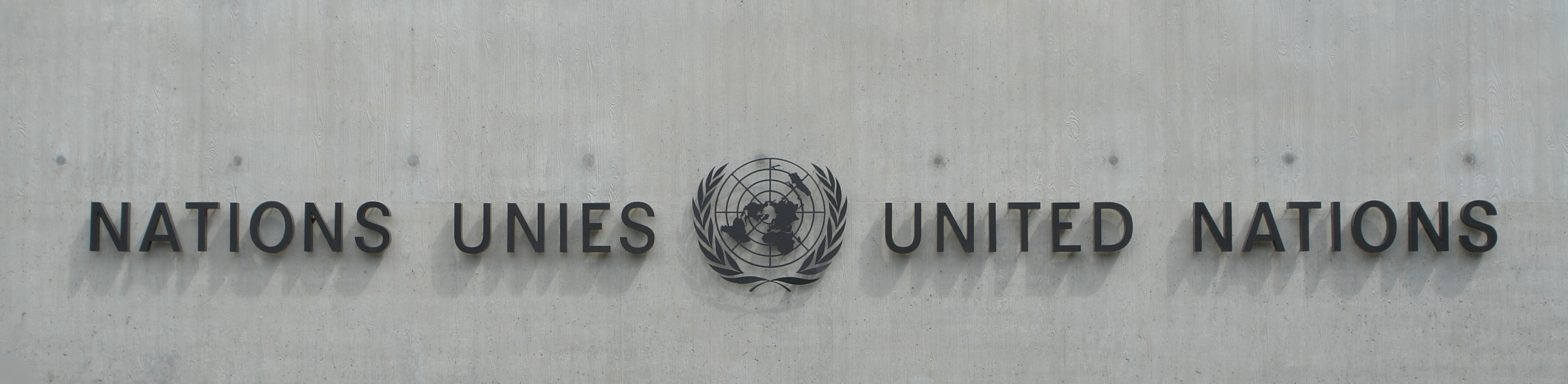
United Nations sign at the United Nations Office at Geneva (Switzerland)

The following outline is provided as an overview of and topical guide to the United Nations:

United Nations – international organization whose stated aims are facilitating cooperation in international law, international security, economic development, social progress, human rights, and achievement of world peace. The UN was founded in 1945 after World War II to replace the League of Nations, to stop wars between countries, and to provide a platform for dialogue. It contains multiple subsidiary organizations to carry out its missions.

== Legal foundation: The United Nations Charter ==
- United Nations Charter – foundational treaty of the United Nations which states that obligations to the United Nations prevail over all other treaty obligations and is binding for all United Nations members.
  - Type of document: treaty
  - Signed: 26 June 1945
  - Location: San Francisco, California, United States
  - Effective: 24 October 1945
  - Condition: Ratification by China, France, the Soviet Union, the United Kingdom, United States and by a majority of the other signatory states.
  - Parties: 193
  - Sections: 20 (the preamble and 19 chapters)
    - Preamble to the United Nations Charter – opening (preamble) of the United Nations Charter.
    - Chapter I: Purposes And Principles – lays out the purposes and principles of the United Nations organization.
    - Chapter II: Membership
    - Chapter III: Organs
    - Chapter IV: The General Assembly
    - Chapter V: The Security Council
    - Chapter VI: Pacific Settlement of Disputes
    - Chapter VII: Action with respect to Threats to the Peace, Breaches of the Peace, and Acts of Aggression
    - Chapter VIII: Regional Arrangements
    - Chapter IX: International Economic and Social Co-operation
    - Chapter X: The Economic and Social Council
    - Chapter XI: Declaration regarding Non-Self-Governing Territories
    - Chapter XII: International Trusteeship System
    - Chapter XIII: The Trusteeship System
    - Chapter XIV: The International Court of Justice
    - Chapter XV: The Secretariat
    - Chapter XVI: Miscellaneous Provisions
    - Chapter XVII: Transitional Security Arrangements
    - Chapter XVIII: Amendments
    - Chapter XIX: Ratification and Signature

== Membership ==
- Member states of the United Nations (United Nations member states)
- Withdrawal from the United Nations

== Geography ==
- United Nations geoscheme
  - United Nations geoscheme for Africa
  - United Nations geoscheme for the Americas
  - United Nations geoscheme for Asia
  - United Nations geoscheme for Europe
  - United Nations geoscheme for Oceania

== Buildings and structures ==
- United Nations headquarters

== United Nations System ==
- United Nations System

=== Core structure of the United Nations ===
==== General Assembly ====
- United Nations General Assembly
  - Main Committees
    - The First Committee: Disarmament and International Security (DISEC)
    - The Second Committee: Economic and Financial (ECOFIN)
    - The Third Committee: Social, Cultural, and Humanitarian (SOCHUM)
    - The Fourth Committee: Special Political and Decolonisation (SPECPOL)
    - The Fifth Committee: Administrative and Budgetary
    - The Sixth Committee: Legal.
  - Other committees and subsidiary bodies
    - Peacebuilding Commission (also reports to the Security Council)
    - Human Rights Council

==== Security Council ====
- United Nations Security Council
  - Subsidiary bodies
    - Military Staff Committee
    - Peacebuilding Commission (also reports to the General Assembly)
  - Sanctions committees
  - International criminal tribunals
    - International Criminal Tribunal for the Former Yugoslavia
    - International Criminal Tribunal for Rwanda

==== Economic and Social Council ====
United Nations Economic and Social Council

- Functional Commissions
  - Commission for Social Development
  - Commission on Narcotic Drugs
    - International Narcotics Control Board
  - Commission on Crime Prevention and Criminal Justice
  - Commission on Science and Technology for Development
  - Commission on Sustainable Development
  - Commission on the Status of Women
  - Commission on Population and Development
  - Statistical Commission
  - United Nations Forum on Forests
- Regional Commissions
  - United Nations Economic Commission for Europe (ECE)
  - United Nations Economic Commission for Africa (ECA)
  - United Nations Economic Commission for Latin America and the Caribbean (ECLAC)
  - United Nations Economic and Social Commission for Asia and the Pacific (ESCAP)
  - United Nations Economic and Social Commission for Western Asia (ESCWA)

==== United Nations Secretariat ====
- United Nations Secretariat
  - Commission on Population and Development
  - United Nations Deputy Secretary-General
  - Microcredit
  - Nafis Sadik
  - Rafael M. Salas
  - Jomo Kwame Sundaram
  - Under-Secretary-General of the United Nations
  - United Nations Economic and Social Commission for Asia and the Pacific
  - United Nations Economic and Social Commission for Western Asia
  - United Nations Permanent Forum on Indigenous Issues
  - United Nations Secretariat
  - United Nations Secretary-General
  - United Nations Statistical Commission

===== United Nations Secretariat offices =====
- Office of Legal Affairs (OLA)
- Office of Internal Oversight Services (OIOS)
- Office for Disarmament Affairs (ODA)
- Office for the Coordination of Humanitarian Affairs (OCHA)
- Office of the United Nations High Commissioner for Human Rights (OHCHR)

===== United Nations Secretariat departments =====
- Department of Political and Peacebuilding Affairs (DPPA)
  - Special political missions
- Department of Peace Operations (DPO)
  - Peacekeeping operations
- Department of Field Support (DFS)
- Department of Management (DM)
- Department of Economic and Social Affairs (DESA)
- Department of General Assembly and Conference Management (DGACM)
- Department of Public Information (DPI)

==== International Court of Justice ====
- International Court of Justice (ICtJ)
- Jurisdiction of the International Court of Justice
- Leonid Skotnikov

===== International Court of Justice cases =====
- Bosnian genocide case at the International Court of Justice
- International Court of Justice advisory opinion on the Legality of the Threat or Use of Nuclear Weapons
- International Court of Justice advisory opinion on the Legality of the Use by a State of Nuclear Weapons in Armed Conflict
- List of International Court of Justice cases
- LaGrand case
- Nicaragua v. United States
- Lotus case

===== International Court of Justice judges =====
- Ronny Abraham
- Awn Shawkat Al-Khasawneh
- Thomas Buergenthal
- John Dugard
- Nabil Elaraby
- Taslim Olawale Elias
- Rosalyn Higgins
- Robert Yewdall Jennings
- Philip Jessup
- Eduardo Jimenez de Arechaga
- Kenneth Keith
- Muhammad Zafrulla Khan
- Pieter Kooijmans
- Abdul G. Koroma
- Manfred Lachs
- Nagendra Singh
- Shigeru Oda
- Hisashi Owada
- Gonzalo Parra Aranguren
- Raymond Ranjeva
- John Erskine Read
- Francisco Rezek
- Jose Maria Ruda
- Stephen M. Schwebel
- Bernardo Sepúlveda Amor
- Shi Jiuyong
- Bruno Simma
- Peter Tomka
- Humphrey Waldock
- Christopher Weeramantry

==== Trusteeship Council ====
United Nations Trusteeship Council

=== Funds and programmes, research and training institutes, and other bodies ===
==== Funds and programmes ====
- International Trade Centre (ITC)
- Office of the United Nations High Commissioner for Refugees (OHCHR)
- United Nations Children's Fund (UNICEF)
- United Nations Conference on Trade and Development (UNCTAD)
- United Nations Development Programme (UNDP)
  - United Nations Capital Development Fund (UNCDF)
  - United Nations Volunteers (UNV)
- United Nations Environment Programme (UNEP)
- United Nations Human Settlements Programme (UN-HABITAT)
- United Nations Office on Drugs and Crime (UNODC)
- United Nations Population Fund (UNFPA)
- United Nations Relief and Works Agency for Palestine Refugees in the Near East (UNRWA)
- World Food Programme (WFP)

==== Research and training institutes ====
- United Nations Institute for Disarmament Research (UNIDIR)
- United Nations Institute for Training and Research (UNITAR)
- United Nations Interregional Crime and Justice Research Institute (UNICRI)
- United Nations Research Institute for Social Development (UNRISD)

==== Secretariats of Conventions ====
- Convention on the Rights of Persons with Disabilities
- UNCCD – United Nations Convention to Combat Desertification
- UNFCCC – United Nations Framework Convention on Climate Change
- UNCLOS – United Nations Convention on the Law of the Sea established bodies:
  - ISA – International Seabed Authority
  - ITLOS – International Tribunal for the Law of the Sea

==== Other entities ====
- Joint United Nations Programme on HIV/AIDS (UNAIDS)
- United Nations Entity for Gender Equality and the Empowerment of Women (UN Women)
- United Nations Office for Project Services (UNOPS)
- United Nations System Staff College (UNSSC)
- United Nations University (UNU)

=== Specialized agencies ===
Specialized agencies of the United Nations – autonomous organizations working with the United Nations and each other through the coordinating machinery of the Economic and Social Council.

- International Labour Organization (ILO)
- Food and Agriculture Organization (FAO)
- United Nations Educational, Scientific and Cultural Organization (UNESCO)
- World Health Organization (WHO)
- World Bank Group
  - International Bank for Reconstruction and Development(IBRD)
  - International Development Association (IDA)
  - International Finance Corporation (IFC)
  - Multilateral Investment Guarantee Agency (MIGA)
  - International Centre for Settlement of Investment Disputes (ICSID)
- International Monetary Fund (IMF)
- International Civil Aviation Organization ICAO
- International Maritime Organization (IMO)
- International Telecommunication Union (ITU)
- Universal Postal Union (UPU)
- World Meteorological Organization (WMO)
- World Intellectual Property Organization (WIPO)
- International Fund for Agricultural Development (IFAD)
- United Nations Industrial Development Organization (UNIDO)
- World Tourism Organization (UNWTO)
- International Refugee Organization (IRO); ceased to exist in 1952

==== International Civil Aviation Organization ====
- International Civil Aviation Organization
- Kenneth Beaumont
- Convention on International Civil Aviation
- ICAO airline designator
- ICAO airport code
- Assad Kotaite
- Shivinder Singh Sidhu
- Edward Pearson Warner

===== ICAO airline designator =====
- Airline call sign
- ICAO airline designator
- International Civil Aviation Organization

===== ICAO airport designator =====
- List of airports by ICAO code
- List of airports by ICAO code: A
- List of airports by ICAO code: B
- List of airports by ICAO code: C
- List of airports by ICAO code: D
- List of airports by ICAO code: EB-EG
- List of airports by ICAO code: EH-EY
- List of airports by ICAO code: FA-FM
- List of airports by ICAO code: FN-FZ
- List of airports by ICAO code: G
- List of airports by ICAO code: H
- List of airports by ICAO code: I
- List of airports by ICAO code: J
- List of airports by ICAO code: K
- List of airports by ICAO code: L
- List of airports by ICAO code: M
- List of airports by ICAO code: N
- List of airports by ICAO code: O
- List of airports by ICAO code: P
- List of airports by ICAO code: Q
- List of airports by ICAO code: R
- List of airports by ICAO code: S
- List of airports by ICAO code: T
- List of airports by ICAO code: U
- List of airports by ICAO code: V
- List of airports by ICAO code: W
- List of airports by ICAO code: X
- List of airports by ICAO code: Y
- List of airports by ICAO code: Z

==== International Monetary Fund ====
- Annual Meetings of the International Monetary Fund and the World Bank Group
- International Financial Statistics
- International Monetary Fund
- Life and Debt
- Raymond Mikesell
- Singapore 2006
- Special drawing rights
- United Nations Monetary and Financial Conference

===== Managing directors of the International Monetary Fund =====
- Michel Camdessus
- Camille Gutt
- Ivar Rooth
- Per Jacobsson
- Horst Köhler
- Anne O. Krueger
- Jacques de Larosière
- Rodrigo Rato
- Pierre-Paul Schweitzer
- H. Johannes Witteveen

==== International Telecommunication Union ====
- International Telecommunication Union
- ITU-D
- ITU-R
- Radio Regulations
- Regional Radiocommunication Conference
- ITU region
- ITU-T
- ITU Youth Forum
- Tunis Agenda for the Information Society
- Tunis Commitment
- Video Coding Experts Group
- World Information Society Day
- World Radiocommunication Conference
- World Summit on the Information Society

===== ITU-R recommendations =====
- CCIR 601
- Coordinated Universal Time
- Error Detection and Handling
- ITU-R 468 noise weighting
- ITU-R BS.1534-1
- ITU-R BT.1304
- ITU-R BT.470-6
- ITU-R BT.470-7
- ITU-R BT.601
- ITU-R BT.656
- ITU-R M.824
- ITU-R TF.460-4
- ITU656
- MUSHRA
- NTSC
- PAL
- Racon
- Serial digital interface
- Standard:ITU-R 468

===== ITU-T recommendations =====
- ATM Adaptation Layers
- Abstract Syntax Notation One
- Allowed cell rate
- Asymmetric Digital Subscriber Line
- Asynchronous Transfer Mode
- Basic Encoding Rules
- Broadband Integrated Services Digital Network
- CHILL
- CLNS
- Canonical Encoding Rules
- Common Management Information Protocol
- DOCSIS
- Distinguished Encoding Rules
- E.123
- E.163
- E.164
- E.214
- FTAM
- Fax
- G.114
- G.165
- G.703
- G.709
- G.711
- G.722
- G.722.1
- AMR-WB
- G.723
- G.723.1
- G.726
- G.728
- G.729
- G.729a
- G.983
- G.984
- ITU G.991.2
- GDMO
- Generic Framing Procedure
- H.225.0
- H.235
- H.239
- H.245
- H.248
- H.261
- H.262
- H.263
- H.264/MPEG-4 AVC
- H.320
- H.323
- H.324
- H.450
- ITU G.992.1
- ITU G.992.2
- ITU G.992.3/4
- ITU G.992.5
- Integrated Services Digital Network
- Intelligent Network
- JBIG
- LCAS
- List of ITU-T V-series recommendations
- List of mobile country codes
- MML (language)
- Megaco
- Mobile Station Integrated Services Digital Network
- Mu-law algorithm
- Numbering plan
- OSI model
- Open Document Architecture
- Open Document Interchange Format
- Open Systems Interconnection
- Packed Encoding Rules
- Packet Layer Protocol
- Public switched telephone network
- Q.931
- R interface
- Registration, Admission and Status
- Remote Operations Service Element protocol
- S interface
- Signalling Connection Control Part
- Signaling System 7
- Specification and Description Language
- Symmetric High-speed Digital Subscriber Line
- T.120
- T.37
- T.38
- T.50
- T.61
- T.82
- TTCN
- Telecommunications Management Network
- Teletex
- Transaction Capabilities Application Part
- U interface
- Up0-interface
- V.24
- V.92
- Very-high-bit-rate Digital Subscriber Line 2
- Virtual terminal
- X.121
- X.21
- X.25
- X.400
- X.500
- X.509
- XML Encoding Rules

==== International Labour Organization ====
- Marc Bélanger
- International Labour Conference
- Declaration of Philadelphia
- International Labour Organization
- International Labour Organization/Summary
- International Standard Classification of Occupations
- David A. Morse
- Pilot Project on CSEC, Child Trafficking and educational rehabilitation
- International Programme on the Elimination of Child Labour
- International labour standards
- Time-bound programmes for the eradication of the worst forms of child labour
- Wikipedia:WikiProject Organized Labour/Internationalisation

===== International Labour Organization Conventions =====
- Accommodation of Crews (Fishermen) Convention, 1966
- Accommodation of Crews (Supplementary Provisions) Convention, 1970
- Accommodation of Crews Convention (Revised), 1949
- Accommodation of Crews Convention, 1946
- Asbestos Convention, 1986
- Benzene Convention, 1971
- Certification of Able Seamen Convention, 1946
- Certification of Ships' Cooks Convention, 1946
- Collective Bargaining Convention, 1981
- Continuity of Employment (Seafarers) Convention, 1976
- Contracts of Employment (Indigenous Workers) Convention, 1939 (shelved)
- Contracts of Employment (Indigenous Workers) Convention, 1947 (shelved)
- Convention concerning Statistics of Wages and Hours of Work, 1938
- Discrimination (Employment and Occupation) Convention, 1958
- Dock Work Convention, 1973
- Employment Policy Convention, 1964
- Employment Promotion and Protection against Unemployment Convention, 1988
- Employment Service Convention, 1948
- Equal Remuneration Convention, 1951
- Equality of Treatment (Accident Compensation) Convention, 1925
- Equality of Treatment (Social Security) Convention, 1962
- Medical Examination of Young Persons (Sea) Convention, 1921
- Fee-Charging Employment Agencies Convention (Revised), 1949
- Fee-Charging Employment Agencies Convention, 1933 (shelved)
- Final Articles Revision Convention, 1946
- Final Articles Revision Convention, 1961
- Fishermen's Articles of Agreement Convention, 1959
- Fishermen's Competency Certificates Convention, 1966
- Food and Catering (Ships' Crews) Convention, 1946
- Forced Labour Convention, 1930
- Forty-Hour Week Convention, 1935
- Freedom of Association and Protection of the Right to Organise Convention, 1948
- Guarding of Machinery Convention, 1963
- Health Protection and Medical Care (Seafarers) Convention, 1987
- Holidays with Pay (Agriculture) Convention, 1952
- Holidays with Pay (Sea) Convention, 1936
- Holidays with Pay Convention (Revised), 1970
- Holidays with Pay Convention, 1936
- Home Work Convention, 1996
- Hours of Work (Industry) Convention, 1919
- Hours of Work (Coal Mines) Convention (Revised), 1935
- Hours of Work (Coal Mines) Convention, 1931
- Hours of Work (Commerce and Offices) Convention, 1930
- Hours of Work and Manning (Sea) Convention, 1936
- Hours of Work and Rest Periods (Road Transport) Convention, 1979
- Human Resources Development Convention, 1975
- Hygiene (Commerce and Offices) Convention, 1964
- ILO Convention
- Inspection of Emigrants Convention, 1926 (shelved)
- Employment Injury Benefits Convention, 1964
- Invalidity Insurance (Agriculture) Convention, 1933 (shelved)
- Invalidity Insurance (Industry, etc.) Convention, 1933 (shelved)
- Invalidity, Old-Age and Survivors' Benefits Convention, 1967
- Labour Administration Convention, 1978
- Labour Clauses (Public Contracts) Convention, 1949
- Labour Inspection (Agriculture) Convention, 1969
- Labour Inspection (Seafarers) Convention, 1996
- Labour Inspection Convention, 1947
- Labour Inspectorates (Non-Metropolitan Territories) Convention, 1947
- Labour Relations (Public Service) Convention, 1978
- Labour Standards (Non-Metropolitan Territories) Convention, 1947
- Labour Statistics Convention, 1985
- Maintenance of Migrants' Pension Rights Convention, 1935 (shelved)
- Maintenance of Social Security Rights Convention, 1982
- Marking of Weight (Packages Transported by Vessels) Convention, 1929
- Maternity Protection Convention, 1919
- Maternity Protection Convention (Revised), 1952
- Maternity Protection Convention, 2000
- Abolition of Penal Sanctions (Indigenous Workers) Convention, 1955 (shelved)
- Abolition of Forced Labour Convention, 1957
- Weekly Rest (Commerce and Offices) Convention, 1957
- Indigenous and Tribal Populations Convention, 1957
- Seafarers' Identity Documents Convention, 1958
- Seafarers' Identity Documents Convention (Revised), 2003
- Chemicals Convention, 1990
- Night Work Convention, 1990
- Working Conditions (Hotels and Restaurants) Convention, 1991
- Safety and Health in Agriculture Convention, 2001
- Maximum Weight Convention, 1967
- Medical Care and Sickness Benefits Convention, 1969
- Medical Examination (Fishermen) Convention, 1959
- Medical Examination (Seafarers) Convention, 1946
- Medical Examination of Young Persons (Non-Industrial Occupations) Convention, 1946
- Medical Examination of Young Persons (Underground Work) Convention, 1965
- Merchant Shipping (Minimum Standards) Convention, 1976
- Migrant Workers (Supplementary Provisions) Convention, 1975
- Migration for Employment Convention (Revised), 1949
- Migration for Employment Convention, 1939
- Minimum Age (Industry) Convention, 1919
- Minimum Age (Sea) Convention, 1920
- Minimum Age (Agriculture) Convention, 1921
- Minimum Age (Sea) Convention (Revised), 1936
- Minimum Age (Industry) Convention (Revised), 1937
- Minimum Age (Fishermen) Convention, 1959
- Minimum Age (Non-Industrial Employment) Convention (Revised), 1937 (shelved)
- Minimum Age (Non-Industrial Employment) Convention, 1932
- Minimum Age (Underground Work) Convention, 1965
- Minimum Age Convention, 1973
- Minimum Wage Fixing Convention, 1970
- Minimum Wage Fixing Machinery (Agriculture) Convention, 1951
- Minimum Wage-Fixing Machinery Convention, 1928
- Night Work (Women) Convention, 1919 (shelved)
- Night Work of Young Persons (Industry) Convention, 1919
- Night Work (Bakeries) Convention, 1925 (shelved)
- Night Work of Young Persons (Industry) Convention (Revised), 1948
- Night Work (Women) Convention (Revised), 1934 (shelved)
- Night Work (Women) Convention (Revised), 1948
- Night Work of Young Persons (Non-Industrial Occupations) Convention, 1946
- Nursing Personnel Convention, 1977
- Occupational Cancer Convention, 1974
- Occupational Health Services Convention, 1985
- Occupational Safety and Health (Dock Work) Convention, 1979
- Occupational Safety and Health Convention, 1981
- Officers' Competency Certificates Convention, 1936
- Old-Age Insurance (Agriculture) Convention, 1933 (shelved)
- Old-Age Insurance (Industry, etc.) Convention, 1933 (shelved)
- Paid Educational Leave Convention, 1974
- Paid Vacations (Seafarers) Convention (Revised), 1949 (shelved)
- Paid Vacations (Seafarers) Convention, 1946
- Part-Time Work Convention, 1994
- Penal Sanctions (Indigenous Workers) Convention, 1939 (shelved)
- Placing of Seamen Convention, 1920
- Plantations Convention, 1958
- Prevention of Accidents (Seafarers) Convention, 1970
- Prevention of Major Industrial Accidents Convention, 1993
- Private Employment Agencies Convention, 1997
- Protection against Accidents (Dockers) Convention (Revised), 1932
- Protection against Accidents (Dockers) Convention, 1929 (shelved)
- Protection of Wages Convention, 1949
- Protection of Workers' Claims (Employer's Insolvency) Convention, 1992
- Radiation Protection Convention, 1960
- Recruiting of Indigenous Workers Convention, 1936 (shelved)
- Recruitment and Placement of Seafarers Convention, 1996
- Reduction of Hours of Work (Glass-Bottle Works) Convention, 1935 (shelved)
- Reduction of Hours of Work (Public Works) Convention, 1936
- Reduction of Hours of Work (Textiles) Convention, 1937
- Repatriation of Seafarers Convention (Revised), 1987
- Repatriation of Seamen Convention, 1926
- Right of Association (Agriculture) Convention, 1921
- Right of Association (Non-Metropolitan Territories) Convention, 1947
- Right to Organise and Collective Bargaining Convention, 1949
- Rural Workers' Organisations Convention, 1975
- Safety Provisions (Building) Convention, 1937
- Safety and Health in Construction Convention, 1988
- Safety and Health in Mines Convention, 1995
- Seafarers' Annual Leave with Pay Convention, 1976
- Seafarers' Hours of Work and the Manning of Ships Convention, 1996
- Seafarers' Pensions Convention, 1946
- Seafarers' Welfare Convention, 1987
- Seamen's Articles of Agreement Convention, 1926
- Sheet-Glass Works Convention, 1934 (shelved)
- Shipowners' Liability (Sick and Injured Seamen) Convention, 1936
- Sickness Insurance (Agriculture) Convention, 1927
- Sickness Insurance (Industry) Convention, 1927
- Sickness Insurance (Sea) Convention, 1936
- Social Policy (Basic Aims and Standards) Convention, 1962
- Social Policy (Non-Metropolitan Territories) Convention, 1947
- Social Security (Minimum Standards) Convention, 1952
- Social Security (Seafarers) Convention (Revised), 1987
- Social Security (Seafarers) Convention, 1946
- Survivors' Insurance (Agriculture) Convention, 1933 (shelved)
- Termination of Employment Convention, 1982
- Tripartite Consultation (International Labour Standards) Convention, 1976
- Underground Work (Women) Convention, 1935
- Unemployment Convention, 1919
- Unemployment Indemnity (Shipwreck) Convention, 1920
- Unemployment Provision Convention, 1934 (shelved)
- Vocational Rehabilitation and Employment (Disabled Persons) Convention, 1983
- Wages, Hours of Work and Manning (Sea) Convention (Revised), 1949
- Wages, Hours of Work and Manning (Sea) Convention (Revised), 1958
- Wages, Hours of Work and Manning (Sea) Convention, 1946
- Weekly Rest (Industry) Convention, 1921
- White Lead (Painting) Convention, 1921
- Workers with Family Responsibilities Convention, 1981
- Workers' Representatives Convention, 1971
- Working Environment (Air Pollution, Noise and Vibration) Convention, 1977
- Workmen's Compensation (Agriculture) Convention, 1921
- Workmen's Compensation (Accidents) Convention, 1925
- Workmen's Compensation (Occupational Diseases) Convention, 1925
- Workmen's Compensation (Occupational Diseases) Convention (Revised), 1934
- Worst Forms of Child Labour Convention, 1999

==== UNESCO ====
- UNESCO
- German Commission for UNESCO
- Arab Cultural Capital
- Carlos J. Finlay Prize for Microbiology
- Creative Cities Network
- Education for Sustainable Development
- FRESH, UNESCO
- Free Software Directory
- Geopark
- Great Apes Survival Project
- Félix Houphouët-Boigny Peace Prize
- Information for All Programme (IFAP)
- International Centre for Theoretical Physics
- International Dance Council
- International José Martí Prize
- International Music Council
- International Simón Bolívar Prize
- Kalinga Prize
- L'Oréal-UNESCO Awards for Women in Science
- MacBride report
- Madhav Das Nalapat
- René Maheu
- Masterpieces of the Oral and Intangible Heritage of Humanity
- Memory of the World Programme
- List of permanent delegates of New Zealand to UNESCO
- UNESCO Courier
- UNESCO Goodwill Ambassador
- UNESCO Nomenclature
- UNESCO Prize for Peace Education
- UNESCO Science Prize
- UNESCO-CEPES
- UNESCO-IHE
- UNESCO/Guillermo Cano World Press Freedom Prize
- UNESCO/Institut Pasteur Medal
- Convention on the Protection and Promotion of the Diversity of Cultural Expressions
- Vittorino Veronese
- World Network of Biosphere Reserves

===== Biosphere reserves =====
- Biosphere reserve
- World Network of Biosphere Reserves
- List of Biosphere Reserves in Argentina
- List of Biosphere Reserves in Algeria
- Aleutian Islands National Wildlife Refuge
- List of Biosphere Reserves in Australia
- List of Biosphere Reserves in Austria
- List of Biosphere Reserves in Brazil
- List of Biosphere Reserves in Bolivia
- Beinn Eighe
- List of Biosphere Reserves in Belarus
- Biosphere Reserve Middle Elbe
- Bosawas Biosphere Reserve
- Braunton Burrows
- List of Biosphere Reserves in Bulgaria
- List of UNESCO Biosphere Reserves in Canada
- List of UNESCO Biosphere Reserves in China
- Calakmul Biosphere Reserve
- List of biosphere reserves in Cameroon
- Cape Lookout National Seashore
- Cascade Head
- Central Balkan National Park
- Chamela-Cuixmala Biosphere Reserve
- Chatkal National Park
- Clayoquot Sound
- List of Biosphere Reserves in Colombia
- Coram Experimental Forest
- List of Biosphere Reserves in Cuba
- Cumberland Island National Seashore
- List of Biosphere Reserves in the Czech Republic
- List of Biosphere Reserves in the Democratic Republic of the Congo
- Desert Biosphere Reserve
- List of Biosphere Reserves in Ecuador
- El Angolo Hunting enclosed land
- El Vizcaíno Biosphere Reserve
- List of Biosphere Reserves in France
- List of Biosphere Reserves in Germany
- Gluepot Reserve
- Golden Gate Biosphere Reserve
- Golija-Studenica
- Maya Biosphere Reserve
- List of Biosphere Reserves in Guinea
- List of Biosphere Reserves in Hungary
- Hawaiian Islands Biosphere Reserve
- Huascarán National Park
- List of Biosphere Reserves in Indonesia
- List of Biosphere Reserves in Iran
- List of Biosphere Reserves in Israel
- List of Biosphere Reserves in Italy
- List of Biosphere Reserves in Japan
- List of Biosphere Reserves in Kenya
- Lac Saint-Pierre
- Laquipampa Reserved Zone
- Long Point
- List of Biosphere Reserves in Mexico
- Macquarie Island
- List of Biosphere Reserves in Madagascar
- Mammoth Cave National Park
- Manú National Park
- Mare aux Hippopotames
- Mojave and Colorado Deserts Biosphere Reserve
- List of Biosphere Reserves in Mongolia
- Mont Saint-Hilaire
- Mount Nimba Strict Nature Reserve
- Mulanje Massif
- National Park Sjeverni Velebit
- Natural and Cultural Peruvian Heritage
- New Jersey Pinelands Biosphere Reserve
- Niagara Escarpment
- North Bull Island
- North Vidzeme Biosphere Reserve
- Pendjari National Park
- List of Biosphere Reserves in Peru
- Queen Elizabeth National Park
- Riding Mountain National Park
- List of Biosphere Reserves in the Russian Federation
- Río Plátano Biosphere Reserve
- List of Biosphere Reserves in Spain
- Schaalsee
- List of Biosphere Reserves in Senegal
- Sian Ka'an
- Sierra Gorda
- Sinharaja Forest Reserve
- List of Biosphere Reserves in South Africa
- Spreewald
- List of Biosphere Reserves in Sri Lanka
- Sunchubamba Hunting enclosed land
- Swiss National Park
- List of Biosphere Reserves in Tunisia
- List of Biosphere Reserves in Thailand
- Thousand Islands - Frontenac Arch
- Tonlé Sap
- List of Biosphere Reserves in Ukraine
- Ulla Ulla National Reserve
- List of Biosphere Reserves in the United Kingdom
- List of Biosphere Reserves in Tanzania
- List of Biosphere Reserves in the United States
- University of Michigan Biological Station
- Unnamed Conservation Park
- Urdaibai
- Uvs Nuur
- Volcanoes National Park
- W National Park
- Waterberg Biosphere
- Waterton Lakes National Park

===== UNESCO Directors-General =====
- Audrey Azoulay
- Irina Bokova
- Luther Evans
- Julian Huxley
- René Maheu
- Koïchiro Matsuura
- Federico Mayor
- Amadou-Mahtar M'Bow
- John Wilkinson Taylor
- Jaime Torres Bodet
- Vittorino Veronese

==== Universal Postal Union ====
- European Conference of Postal and Telecommunications Administrations
- Universal Postal Union
- .post
- Eugène Borel
- Express mail
- Extraterritorial Office of Exchange
- Illegal stamps
- International reply coupon
- S10 (UPU standard)
- Heinrich von Stephan

==== World Bank ====
- World Bank Group
- Operations Evaluation Department
- Annual Meetings of the International Monetary Fund and the World Bank Group
- Hedayat Arsala
- Nancy Barry
- Marek Belka
- Berg report
- Betty Oyella Bigombe
- Don Brash
- Shahid Javed Burki
- Consultative Group on International Agricultural Research
- Shelton H. Davis
- Kemal Derviş
- Luisa Diogo
- Jessica Einhorn
- Ashraf Ghani
- Glenn Hubbard (economics)
- InfoDev
- International Bank for Reconstruction and Development
- International Centre for Settlement of Investment Disputes
- International Development Association
- International Finance Corporation
- Life and Debt
- Raymond Mikesell
- Mohamed Muhsin
- Multilateral Investment Guarantee Agency
- Nicéphore Soglo
- Pearson Commission on International Development
- Moeenuddin Ahmad Qureshi
- Escott Reid
- Arun Shourie
- Singapore 2006
- United Nations Monetary and Financial Conference
- Robert Watson (scientist)
- World Bank Scholarship
- World Congress on Communication for Development

===== Presidents of the World Bank =====
- Eugene R. Black
- Alden W. Clausen
- Barber Conable
- John J. McCloy
- Robert McNamara
- Eugene Meyer
- Lewis Thompson Preston
- James Wolfensohn
- Paul Wolfowitz
- George David Woods

===== World Bank Chief Economists =====
- François Bourguignon
- Stanley Fischer
- Nicholas Stern
- Joseph E. Stiglitz
- Lawrence Summers

==== World Health Organization ====
- World Health Organization
- Bamako Initiative
- Council for International Organizations of Medical Sciences
- Department of Essential Drugs and Medicines
- Essential medicines
- WHO Framework Convention on Tobacco Control
- International Radon Project
- Uppsala Monitoring Centre
- WHO Model List of Essential Medicines
- World Health Day

===== Human Development Index =====
- Human Development Index
- List of African countries by Human Development Index
- List of China administrative divisions by HDI
- List of Latin American subnational entities by HDI
- List of Mexican states by HDI
- List of countries by Human Development Index
- List of countries by Human Development Index, 2005

== History of the United Nations ==
=== League of Nations ===
- League of Nations
- Aga Khan III
- Åland crisis
- Allies of World War I
- American Commission to Negotiate Peace
- Article X of the Covenant of the League of Nations
- Joseph Louis Anne Avenol
- Corfu incident
- Free City of Danzig
- Albert Dufour-Feronce
- Fourteen Points
- Freedom of the seas
- Edward M. House
- Hungarian Volunteers in the Winter War
- International Law Commission
- Klaipėda Region
- Seán Lester
- Henry Cabot Lodge
- James Grover McDonald
- League of Nations members
- Nitobe Inazo
- Palais des Nations
- Paris Peace Conference, 1919
- Permanent Court of International Justice
- Eric Drummond, 7th Earl of Perth
- Nicolae Petrescu-Comnen
- Saar (League of Nations)
- Treaty of Versailles
- Woodrow Wilson
- Winter War
- World Disarmament Conference

==== League of Nations Mandates ====
- League of Nations mandate
- Cameroons
- Cameroun
- British Mandate of Mesopotamia
- French Mandate of Lebanon
- Territory of New Guinea
- British Mandate of Palestine
- Ruanda-Urundi
- South Seas Mandate
- South-West Africa
- Southern Cameroons
- French Mandate of Syria
- Tanganyika
- British Togoland
- French Togoland
- Transjordan
- United Nations Trust Territories

=== Formation ===
- London Declaration (1941)
- Atlantic Charter (1941)
- Declaration by United Nations (1942)
- Moscow Conference (1943)
- Tehran Conference (1943)
- Dumbarton Oaks Conference (1944)
- Yalta Conference (1945)
- Conference on International Organization (1945)

=== United Nations Trust Territories ===
- Cameroons
- Cameroun
- Territory of New Guinea
- Trust Territory of the Pacific Islands
- Ruanda-Urundi
- Italian Somaliland
- Southern Cameroons
- Tanganyika
- British Togoland
- French Togoland

=== United Nations peacekeeping missions and operations ===
- 2005 July 6 United Nations assault on Cité Soleil, Haiti
- Canadian peacekeeping
- Diplomatic and humanitarian efforts in the Somali Civil War
- International Force for East Timor
- Thom Karremans
- List of United Nations peacekeeping missions
- List of countries where United Nations peacekeepers are currently deployed
- United Nations Operation in Mozambique
- Operation Sharp Guard
- Timeline of United Nations peacekeeping missions
- UNMIT
- United Nations Angola Verification Mission II
- United Nations Assistance Mission for Rwanda
- United Nations Disengagement Observer Force Zone
- United Nations Emergency Force
- United Nations Interim Force in Lebanon
- United Nations Iraq-Kuwait Observation Mission
- United Nations Mission for the Referendum in Western Sahara
- United Nations Mission in Bosnia and Herzegovina
- United Nations Mission in Ethiopia and Eritrea
- United Nations Mission in Haiti
- United Nations Mission in Liberia
- United Nations Mission in Nepal
- United Nations Mission in Sierra Leone
- United Nations Mission in Sudan
- United Nations Mission in the Democratic Republic of Congo
- United Nations Mission of Observers in Tajikistan
- United Nations Mission of Support to East Timor
- United Nations Observer Mission Uganda-Rwanda
- United Nations Observer Mission in Georgia
- United Nations Observer Mission to Verify the Referendum in Eritrea
- United Nations Office in Timor Leste
- United Nations Operation in Côte d'Ivoire
- United Nations Operation in Somalia II
- United Nations Operation in the Congo
- United Nations Peacekeeping Force in Cyprus
- United Nations Preventive Deployment Force
- United Nations Protection Force
- United Nations Stabilization Mission in Haiti
- United Nations Truce Supervision Organization

==== United Nations Mission in Kosovo ====
- Camp Bondsteel
- Kosovo Force
- Bernard Kouchner
- United Nations Interim Administration Mission in Kosovo

=== United Nations General Assembly Resolutions ===
- United Nations General Assembly Resolution
- UN General Assembly Resolution 194
- UN General Assembly Resolution 273
- UN General Assembly Resolution 377 A
- UN General Assembly Resolution 505
- UN General Assembly Resolution 1761
- UN General Assembly Resolution 2758
- UN General Assembly Resolution 3379
- UN General Assembly Resolution 4686
- 1947 UN Partition Plan
- UN General Assembly Resolution 3236
- Declaration on the Granting of Independence to Colonial Countries and Peoples
- List of United Nations resolutions relating to Lebanon
- UN General Assembly Resolution 1668
- UN General Assembly Resolution 1962
- United Nations Convention against Corruption
- United Nations General Assembly Resolution 37/37
- United Nations resolutions on Abkhazia
- Universal Declaration of Human Rights
- List of United Nations Security Council resolutions concerning Iraq

=== United Nations Security Council Resolutions ===
- United Nations Security Council Resolution
- List of United Nations Security Council Resolutions 1 to 100
- List of United Nations Security Council Resolutions 101 to 200
- List of United Nations Security Council Resolutions 201 to 300
- List of United Nations Security Council Resolutions 301 to 400
- List of United Nations Security Council Resolutions 401 to 500
- List of United Nations Security Council Resolutions 501 to 600
- List of United Nations Security Council Resolutions 601 to 700
- List of United Nations Security Council Resolutions 701 to 800
- List of United Nations Security Council Resolutions 801 to 900
- List of United Nations Security Council Resolutions 1001 to 1100
- List of United Nations Security Council Resolutions 1101 to 1200
- List of United Nations Security Council Resolutions 1201 to 1300
- List of United Nations Security Council Resolutions 1301 to 1400
- List of United Nations Security Council Resolutions 1401 to 1500
- List of United Nations Security Council Resolutions 1501 to 1600
- List of United Nations Security Council Resolutions 1601 to 1700
- List of United Nations Security Council Resolutions 1701 to 1800
- United Nations Security Council Resolution 1
- United Nations Security Council Resolution 2
- United Nations Security Council Resolution 3
- United Nations Security Council Resolution 4
- United Nations Security Council Resolution 5
- United Nations Security Council Resolution 6
- United Nations Security Council Resolution 7
- United Nations Security Council Resolution 8
- United Nations Security Council Resolution 9
- United Nations Security Council Resolution 10
- United Nations Security Council Resolution 11
- United Nations Security Council Resolution 12
- United Nations Security Council Resolution 13
- United Nations Security Council Resolution 14
- United Nations Security Council Resolution 15
- United Nations Security Council Resolution 16
- United Nations Security Council Resolution 17
- United Nations Security Council Resolution 18
- United Nations Security Council Resolution 19
- United Nations Security Council Resolution 20
- United Nations Security Council Resolution 21
- United Nations Security Council Resolution 22
- United Nations Security Council Resolution 23
- United Nations Security Council Resolution 24
- United Nations Security Council Resolution 25
- United Nations Security Council Resolution 26
- United Nations Security Council Resolution 27
- United Nations Security Council Resolution 28
- United Nations Security Council Resolution 29
- United Nations Security Council Resolution 30
- United Nations Security Council Resolution 31
- United Nations Security Council Resolution 32
- United Nations Security Council Resolution 33
- United Nations Security Council Resolution 34
- United Nations Security Council Resolution 35
- United Nations Security Council Resolution 36
- United Nations Security Council Resolution 38
- United Nations Security Council Resolution 39
- United Nations Security Council Resolution 40
- United Nations Security Council Resolution 41
- United Nations Security Council Resolution 42
- United Nations Security Council Resolution 43
- United Nations Security Council Resolution 44
- United Nations Security Council Resolution 45
- United Nations Security Council Resolution 46
- United Nations Security Council Resolution 47
- United Nations Security Council Resolution 48
- United Nations Security Council Resolution 49
- United Nations Security Council Resolution 50
- United Nations Security Council Resolution 85
- United Nations Security Council Resolution 241
- United Nations Security Council Resolution 242
- United Nations Security Council Resolution 267
- United Nations Security Council Resolution 338
- United Nations Security Council Resolution 339
- United Nations Security Council Resolution 350
- United Nations Security Council Resolution 446
- United Nations Security Council Resolution 452
- United Nations Security Council Resolution 465
- United Nations Security Council Resolution 471
- United Nations Security Council Resolution 478
- United Nations Security Council Resolution 487
- United Nations Security Council Resolution 497
- United Nations Security Council Resolution 660
- United Nations Security Council Resolution 661
- United Nations Security Council Resolution 678
- United Nations Security Council Resolution 687
- United Nations Security Council Resolution 794
- United Nations Security Council Resolution 837
- United Nations Security Council Resolution 940
- United Nations Security Council Resolution 986
- United Nations Security Council Resolution 1111
- United Nations Security Council Resolution 1284
- United Nations Security Council Resolution 1373
- United Nations Security Council Resolution 1679
- UN Resolutions relating to Cyprus

==== 2002 United Nations Security Council Resolutions ====
- United Nations Security Council Resolution 1422
- United Nations Security Council Resolution 1441

==== 2003 United Nations Security Council Resolutions ====
- United Nations Security Council Resolution 1483
- United Nations Security Council Resolution 1495

==== 2004 United Nations Security Council Resolutions ====
- United Nations Security Council Resolution 1546
- United Nations Security Council Resolution 1559
- United Nations Security Council Resolution 1564
- United Nations Security Council Resolution 1566

==== 2005 United Nations Security Council Resolutions ====
- United Nations Security Council Resolution 1583
- United Nations Security Council Resolution 1591
- United Nations Security Council Resolution 1612

==== 2006 United Nations Security Council Resolutions ====
- United Nations Security Council Resolution 1672
- United Nations Security Council Resolution 1674
- United Nations Security Council Resolution 1675
- United Nations Security Council Resolution 1680
- United Nations Security Council Resolution 1695
- United Nations Security Council Resolution 1696
- United Nations Security Council Resolution 1697
- United Nations Security Council Resolution 1700
- United Nations Security Council Resolution 1701
- United Nations Security Council Resolution 1704
- United Nations Security Council Resolution 1706
- United Nations Security Council Resolution 1718
- United Nations Security Council Resolution 1720
- United Nations Security Council Resolution 1737

=== United Nations reform ===
- Binding Triad
- Committee for a Democratic UN
- Reform of the United Nations
- Reform of the United Nations Security Council
- Sovereignty of the UN Organization

==== United Nations Parliamentary Assembly ====
- Citizens for a United Nations People's Assembly
- Committee for a Democratic UN
- International Network for a United Nations Second Assembly
- Provisional People's Assembly
- United Nations Parliamentary Assembly

=== United Nations relations ===
- Armenia and the United Nations
- Australia and the United Nations
- Canada and the United Nations
- China and the United Nations
- Israel and the United Nations
- Japan and the United Nations
- Soviet Union and the United Nations
- United Kingdom and the United Nations
- United States and the United Nations

=== United Nations tribunals ===
- International Criminal Tribunal for Rwanda
- International Criminal Tribunal for the former Yugoslavia
- Special Court for Sierra Leone

==== International Criminal Tribunal for Rwanda ====
- International Criminal Tribunal for Rwanda
- Carla Del Ponte
- Adama Dieng
- Callixte Gakwaya

===== International Criminal Tribunal for Rwanda judges =====
- Khalida Rachid Khan
- Li Haopei
- Theodor Meron
- Erik Møse
- Fausto Pocar
- Jai Ram Reddy
- Wolfgang Schomburg
- Inés Mónica Weinberg de Roca

===== People charged by the International Criminal Tribunal for Rwanda =====
- Théoneste Bagosora
- Jérôme Bicamumpaka
- Simon Bikindi
- Casimir Bizimungu
- Jean-Baptiste Gatete
- Idelphonse Hategekimana
- Félicien Kabuga
- Protais Mpiranya
- Idelphonse Nizeyimana
- Callixte Nzabonimana
- François-Xavier Nzuwonemeye
- Tharcisse Renzaho
- Innocent Sagahutu
- Juvénal Uwilingiyimana
- Protais Zigiranyirazo

===== People convicted by the International Criminal Tribunal for Rwanda =====
- Jean Akayesu
- Jean Kambanda
- Hassan Ngeze
- Elizaphan Ntakirutimana
- Georges Ruggiu
- Athanase Seromba

==== International Criminal Tribunal for the former Yugoslavia ====
- International Criminal Tribunal for the former Yugoslavia
- List of ICTY indictees
- Milošević trial
- Daryl A. Mundis
- Operation Storm

===== People convicted by the International Criminal Tribunal for the former Yugoslavia =====
- Milan Babić
- Haradin Bala
- Predrag Banović
- Vidoje Blagojević
- Tihomir Blaškić
- Dražen Erdemović
- Hazim Delić
- Goran Jelisić
- Radislav Krstić
- Dragan Nikolić (war criminal)
- Naser Orić
- Biljana Plavšić
- Duško Tadić
- Mitar Vasiljević
- Zoran Vuković
- Zoran Žigić

===== People indicted by the International Criminal Tribunal for the former Yugoslavia =====
- Rahim Ademi
- Milan Babić
- Haradin Bala
- Predrag Banović
- Vidoje Blagojević
- Tihomir Blaškić
- Janko Bobetko
- Valentin Ćorić
- Miroslav Deronjić
- Slavko Dokmanović
- Vlastimir Đorđević
- Ante Gotovina
- Goran Hadžić
- Sefer Halilović
- Ramush Haradinaj
- Goran Jelisić
- Radovan Karadžić
- Milan Kovačević
- Vladimir Kovačević
- Momčilo Krajišnik
- Radislav Krstić
- Fatmir Limaj
- Milan Martić
- Dragomir Milošević
- Slobodan Milošević
- Milan Milutinović
- Ratko Mladić
- Mile Mrkšić
- Agim Murtezi
- Isak Musliu
- Mirko Norac
- Dragan Obrenović
- Momčilo Perišić
- Milivoj Petković
- Biljana Plavšić
- Slobodan Praljak
- Jadranko Prlić
- Željko Ražnatović
- Vojislav Šešelj
- Duško Sikirica
- Milomir Stakić
- Bruno Stojić
- Duško Tadić
- Momir Talić
- Zdravko Tolimir
- Mitar Vasiljević
- Zoran Vuković
- Zoran Žigić
- Stojan Župljanin
- Veselin Šljivančanin

=== United Nations Oil-for-Food scandal ===
- Oil-for-Food Programme
  - Kofi Annan
  - Benon Sevan
  - David B. Chalmers
  - Norm Coleman
  - George Galloway
  - Paul Volcker

=== United Nations in education ===
==== United Nations schools ====
- International School of Geneva
- United Nations International School of Hanoi
- United Nations International School
- University for Peace
- Vienna International School

==== Model United Nations ====
- Model United Nations
  - Harvard National Model United Nations
  - WorldMUN

=== United Nations observances ===
- List of United Nations observances

=== UNESCO designations ===
==== World Heritage Sites ====
- World Heritage Site
- List of World Heritage Sites in Africa
- List of World Heritage Sites in the Americas
- List of World Heritage in Danger
- Aapravasi Ghat
- Angkor
- List of World Heritage Sites in Asia and Australasia
- Belize Barrier Reef
- Brimstone Hill Fortress National Park
- Cocora Valley
- List of World Heritage Sites in Europe
- Henderson Island (Pitcairn Islands)
- Ilulissat
- Joya de Cerén
- Mausoleum of Khoja Ahmed Yasavi
- Morne Trois Pitons National Park
- Mostar
- Ohrid
- Organization of World Heritage Cities
- Riversleigh
- Rock cut architecture
- Škocjan Caves
- Tamgaly
- Template:Infobox World Heritage Site
- Vatican City
- Willemstad
- World Heritage Site
- Table of World Heritage Sites based on State Parties

==== World Book Capitals ====
- World Book Capital
  - Amsterdam
  - Antwerp
  - Bogotá
  - Madrid
  - Montreal

==== Recipients of the Félix Houphouët-Boigny Peace Prize ====
- Félix Houphouët-Boigny Peace Prize
  - Yasser Arafat
  - Álvaro Arzú
  - Jimmy Carter
  - Mustafa Ef. Ceric
  - Community of Sant'Egidio
  - Frederik Willem de Klerk
  - Roger Etchegaray
  - Xanana Gusmão
  - Hague Academy of International Law
  - Sheikh Hasina
  - Juan Carlos I of Spain
  - Nelson Mandela
  - George J. Mitchell
  - Rolando Morán
  - Sadako Ogata
  - Shimon Peres
  - Yitzhak Rabin
  - Fidel V. Ramos
  - Mary Robinson
  - Abdoulaye Wade

==== L’Oréal-UNESCO Awards for Women in Science laureates ====
- L’Oréal-UNESCO Awards for Women in Science
  - Anne McLaren
  - Shirley M. Tilghman
  - Mayana Zatz

==== Masterpieces of the Oral and Intangible Heritage of Humanity ====
- Masterpieces of the Oral and Intangible Heritage of Humanity
  - Aka (Pygmy tribe)
  - Akyn
  - Ath
  - Barranquilla's Carnival
  - Baul
  - Căluşari
  - Day of the Dead
  - Djemaa el Fna
  - Duduk
  - Gelede
  - Guqin
  - Jongmyo
  - Kabuki
  - Koodiyattam
  - Kris
  - Kunqu
  - Lakalaka
  - Maqam
  - Mons
  - Morin khuur
  - Mukamlar
  - Mystery Play of Elx
  - Pansori
  - Taghribat Bani Hilal
  - Vedas
  - Wayang

== United Nations people ==
- Abdennour Abrous
- Shirin Ameeruddy-Cziffra
- Brigitte Andreassier-Pearl
- Michael Bailey
- Jacques-Roger Booh-Booh
- Peter R. Harris
- Igor Korchilov
- Jesús Baigorri Jalón
- Ahmad Kamal
- Vladimir Kuznetsov (diplomat)
- Anna Di Lellio
- Tuan-Li Diana Liao
- Juan E. Méndez
- Pavel Palazhchenko
- Eleanor Roosevelt
- Jomo Kwame Sundaram

=== United Nations officials ===
- Prince Sadruddin Aga Khan
- Brigitte Andreassier-Pearl
- Antonio Castro Leal
- Louise Arbour
- Alicia Bárcena Ibarra
- Carol Bellamy
- Gro Harlem Brundtland
- Gerald Caplan
- Andrew W. Cordier
- António Costa
- United Nations Deputy Secretary-General
- Kemal Derviş
- Ahmed Djoghlaf
- Charles A. Duelfer
- Jan Egeland
- Mohamed ElBaradei
- Ibrahim Gambari
- Bettina Goislard
- Rajat Gupta
- Denis Halliday
- Peter Hansen (UN)
- Dick Heyward
- John Peters Humphrey
- Razali Ismail
- Robert Gillman Allen Jackson
- Jesús Baigorri Jalón
- Jean-Sélim Kanaan
- Mukesh Kapila
- Karl Theodor Paschke
- Salem Hanna Khamis
- Karen Koning AbuZayd
- Igor Korchilov
- Bernard Kouchner
- John Langmore
- Joseph Legwaila
- Stephen Lewis
- Tuan-Li Diana Liao
- List of ambassadors to the United Nations
- José Luis Machinea
- Andrew MacLeod
- Mark Malloch Brown
- Maimunah Mohd Sharif
- Ad Melkert
- Sérgio Vieira de Mello
- Michèle Montas
- Asha-Rose Migiro
- Chandran Nair
- Thoraya Obaid
- Francis Martin O'Donnell
- Palamadai S. Lokanathan
- Pavel Palazhchenko
- Peter Piot
- Jan Pronk
- Ashraf Qazi
- Bertrand Ramcharan
- Delphine Red Shirt
- Mary Robinson
- Terje Rød-Larsen
- Jeffrey Sachs
- Nafis Sadik
- Rafael M. Salas
- John A. Scali
- Arkady Shevchenko
- Shi Jiuyong
- Sigvard Eklund
- Special Representative of the Secretary General
- Achim Steiner
- Thorvald Stoltenberg
- Maurice Strong
- Malcolm Templeton
- Thant Myint-U
- Shashi Tharoor
- Anna Tibaijuka
- Klaus Töpfer
- Danilo Türk
- Under-Secretary-General of the United Nations
- Ann Veneman
- Vijay K. Nambiar
- Joke Waller-Hunter
- Fiona Watson
- Alexander Yakovlev (UN)
- Nadia Younes

==== Ambassadors to the United Nations ====
- List of ambassadors to the United Nations
- Permanent Representative
- Mahamat Ali Adoum
- Yaşar Aliyev
- Tawfeeq Ahmed Almansoor
- Araya Desta
- Francisco Arias Cárdenas
- Ricardo Alberto Arias
- John William Ashe
- Aksoltan Ataýewa
- Lauro L. Baja Jr.
- Rosemary Banks
- Enrique Berruga
- Paulette Bethel
- Jérémie Bonnelame
- Francis K. Butagira
- Canadian ambassadors to the United Nations
- Carmen Maria Gallardo Hernandez
- Chem Widhya
- Iftekhar Ahmed Chowdhury
- Julian Vila Coma
- David J. Cooney
- Andrei Dapkiunas
- Pierson Dixon
- Martin Belinga Eboutou
- Nana Effah-Apenteng
- Ravan A. G. Farhâdi
- Joseph Nanven Garba
- Dan Gillerman
- Christopher Fitzherbert Hackett
- Robert Hill (Australian politician)
- Julian Hunte
- Simon Idohou
- Baki İlkin
- Samuel Insanally
- Michel Kafando
- Yerzhan Kazykhanov
- Roman Kirn
- Jean-Marc de La Sablière
- Mohamed Latheef (ambassador)
- Anders Lidén
- Kirsti Lintonen
- Ellen Margrethe Løj
- Augustine P. Mahiga
- Adam Malik
- Gaspar Martins
- Armen Martirosyan
- César Mayoral
- John McNee (diplomat)
- Celestino Migliore
- Heraldo Muñoz
- Adrian Neritani
- List of permanent representatives of New Zealand to the United Nations in New York
- List of permanent representatives of New Zealand to the United Nations in Geneva
- List of permanent representatives of New Zealand to the United Nations in Vienna
- Kenzo Oshima
- Samuel O. Outlule
- Pak Kil-yon
- Arvid Pardo
- Emyr Jones Parry
- David Peleg
- Joe Robert Pemagbi
- Daw Penjo
- Gerhard Pfanzelter
- Gunter Pleuger
- Miloš Prica
- Ronaldo Mota Sardenberg
- Isikia Savua
- Philip Sealy
- Nirupam Sen
- Anthony Severin
- Mohamed El-Amine Souef
- Marcello Spatafora
- Andrzej Towpik
- Permanent Representative of the United Kingdom to the United Nations
- United States Ambassador to the United Nations
- Johan C. Verbeke
- Wang Guangya
- Nugroho Wisnumurti
- Youcef Yousfi
- M. Javad Zarif
- Zeid Ra’ad Zeid Al-Hussein

===== List of Australian ambassadors to the United Nations =====
List of Australian ambassadors to the United Nations

===== Former British Ambassadors to the United Nations =====
- Alexander Cadogan
- Hugh Foot, Baron Caradon
- Gladwyn Jebb, 1st Baron Gladwyn
- Jeremy Greenstock
- David Hannay, Baron Hannay of Chiswick
- Ivor Richard, Baron Richard
- Crispin Tickell
- John Weston

===== Former Canadian Ambassadors to the United Nations =====
- See complete list of former Canadian ambassadors to the United Nations

===== Former Israeli Ambassadors to the United Nations =====
- Abba Eban
- Chaim Herzog
- Benjamin Netanyahu

===== Former Russian and Soviet Ambassadors to the United Nations =====
- Vitaly Churkin
- Andrey Denisov
- Sergey Lavrov

===== United States ambassadors to the United Nations =====
- United States Ambassador to the United Nations
- Madeleine Albright
- John R. Bolton
- John Danforth
- Jeane Kirkpatrick
- Bill Richardson

==== FAO experts ====
- John Boyd Orr, 1st Baron Boyd-Orr
- René Dumont
- Mordecai Ezekiel
- Salem Hanna Khamis
- Chandrika Kumaratunga
- Jan Mulder
- Binay Ranjan Sen
- Mahmoud Solh
- Edward Szczepanik
- Togba-Nah Tipoteh
- Metha Wanapat

==== Presidents of the United Nations General Assembly ====
- Haya Rashed Al-Khalifa
- Oswaldo Aranha
- José Arce
- Emilio Arenales Catalán
- Víctor Andrés Belaúnde
- Frederick Boland
- Abdelaziz Bouteflika
- Angie Elisabeth Brooks
- Guido de Marco
- Jan Eliasson
- Amara Essy
- H. V. Evatt
- Amintore Fanfani
- Diogo Freitas do Amaral
- Joseph Nanven Garba
- Theo-Ben Gurirab
- Edvard Hambro
- Harri Holkeri
- Imre Hollai
- Julian Hunte
- Jorge Illueca
- Samuel Insanally
- Razali Ismail
- Jan Kavan
- Muhammad Zafrulla Khan
- Ismat T. Kittani
- Eelco van Kleffens
- Adam Malik
- Charles Malik
- Corneliu Mănescu
- Lazar Mojsov
- Leslie Munro
- Didier Opertti
- Vijaya Lakshmi Pandit
- Abdul Rahman Pazhwak
- Lester B. Pearson
- Jean Ping
- Alex Quaison-Sackey
- Carlos P. Romulo
- Salim Ahmed Salim
- Han Seung Soo
- Mongi Slim
- Paul-Henri Spaak
- Gaston Thorn
- Wan Waithayakon
- Rüdiger von Wechmar

==== United Nations Secretaries-General ====
- Secretary-General of the United Nations
- Kofi Annan
- Ban Ki-moon
- Boutros Boutros-Ghali
- Gladwyn Jebb, 1st Baron Gladwyn
- Dag Hammarskjöld
- Trygve Lie
- Javier Pérez de Cuéllar
- U Thant
- United Nations
- Kurt Waldheim

==== World Health Organization officials ====
- Kazem Behbehani
- Gro Harlem Brundtland
- Marcolino Gomes Candau
- Margaret Chan
- Kevin De Cock
- Arata Kochi
- Lee Jong-wook
- Halfdan T. Mahler
- Jonathan Mann
- Pascoal Mocumbi
- David Nabarro
- Hiroshi Nakajima
- Anders Nordström
- Mario Raviglione
- Carlo Urbani

=== Special Rapporteurs to the United Nations ===
- United Nations Special Rapporteur
- Asma Jahangir
- Leandro Despouy
- John Dugard
- Hina Jilani
- Paul Hunt
- Manfred Nowak
- Nigel S. Rodley
- Okechukwu Ibeanu
- Rodolfo Stavenhagen
- John Ruggie
- Sima Samar
- Special Rapporteur on the sale of children, child prostitution and child pornography
- Katarina Tomasevski
- Jean Ziegler

=== United Nations Interpreters ===
- Brigitte Andreassier-Pearl
- Jesús Baigorri Jalón
- Igor Korchilov
- Tuan-Li Diana Liao
- Pavel Palazhchenko

=== United Nations experts ===
- Andrea Rossi (economist)

== UN Numbers scheme (for Transport of Dangerous Goods) ==
- UN number - List of UN Numbers
- 0001-0100, 0101-0200, 0201-0300, 0301-0400, 0401-0500, 0501-0600, 0601-0700, 0701-0800, 0801-0900, 0901-1000
- 1001-1100, 1101-1200, 1201-1300, 1301-1400, 1401-1500, 1501-1600, 1601-1700, 1701-1800, 1801-1900, 1901-2000
- 2001-2100, 2101-2200, 2201-2300, 2301-2400, 2401-2500, 2501-2600, 2601-2700, 2701-2800, 2801-2900, 2901-3000
- List of UN Numbers 3001 to 3100
- List of UN Numbers 3101 to 3200
- List of UN Numbers 3201 to 3300
- List of UN Numbers 3301 to 3400

== See also ==
- Qana massacre
- 2005 World Summit
- 2006 United Nations Security Council election
- 2010 Biodiversity Target
- 2010 Biodiversity Indicators Partnership
- Agenda 21
- Aggression (war crime)
- Amendments to the United Nations Charter
- Arusha Accords
- Asia Society
- Asia-Pacific Development Information Programme
- Asian Highway Network
- Attacks on United Nations personnel during the 2006 Israel-Lebanon conflict
- Marc Bélanger
- Biosafety Clearing-House
- Bluewash
- British Mandate of Palestine
- British military intervention in the Sierra Leone Civil War
- Broad Economic Categories
- Brundtland Commission
- Ralph Bunche Park
- CIFAL
- Canal Hotel Bombing
- Cartagena Protocol on Biosafety
- Central Emergency Response Fund
- Centre for Social Development and Humanitarian Affairs
- Chapter VII of the United Nations Charter
- Anwarul Karim Chowdhury
- Commission on Global Governance
- Committee on the Rights of the Child
- Compass Group
- Conference on Disarmament
- Consultative Status
- Convention on Biological Diversity
- Convention on Environmental Impact Assessment in a Transboundary Context
- Convention on the Elimination of All Forms of Discrimination Against Women
- Convention on the Elimination of All Forms of Racial Discrimination
- Convention on the Recognition and Enforcement of Foreign Arbitral Awards
- Convention on the Rights of the Child
- United Nations Correspondents Association
- Dag Hammarskjöld Library
- Decade for the Promotion of a Culture of Peace and Non-Violence for the Children of the World
- Declaration by United Nations
- Democratic deficit
- Diplomatic and humanitarian efforts in the Somali Civil War
- Peggy Dulany
- Earth Charter
- Eastern European Group
- Economic and Finance Committee
- Emergency Sex and Other Desperate Measures
- Enlargement of the United Nations
- Eurest Support Services
- Facts for Life
- Fiji Mission to the United Nations
- Flag of the United Nations
- Forest Principles
- Fourth World Conference on Women
- Freedom of religion
- G4 nations
- General Conference
- UN Global Compact
- The Global Fund to Fight AIDS, Tuberculosis & Malaria
- Global Policy Forum
- Group of 77
- Habitat II
- High Level Threat Panel
- History of the United Nations
- Sub-Commission on the Promotion and Protection of Human Rights
- Human Rights Committee
- IDNDR
- IRIN
- Icara 2
- International Conference on Population and Development
- International Court of Justice Advisory Opinion on Western Sahara
- International Covenant on Economic, Social and Cultural Rights
- International Early Warning Programme
- International response to the Second Chechen War
- The Interpreter
- Iraq sanctions
- JACKSNNZ
- Japanese Peace Bell
- René de Labarrière
- Stuart Leslie
- List of United Nations peacekeeping missions
- List of countries where United Nations peacekeepers are currently deployed
- List of elected members of the United Nations Security Council
- List of the UN resolutions concerning Israel
- MONEE Project
- Mbaye Diagne
- Microcredit
- Millennium Development Goals
- Millennium Summit
- Monterrey Consensus
- Multiple Indicator Cluster Survey
- Music for UNICEF Concert
- National Action Plan for Children
- Negroponte doctrine
- New World Information and Communication Order
- Office of the United Nations High Commissioner for Human Rights
- Operation Orient Express
- Our Global Neighborhood
- PARIS21
- Palais Wilson
- Paul Volcker Committee
- Peacekeeping
- Peacekeeping: Latin American participation
- Philippine Refugee Processing Center
- President of the United Nations General Assembly
- Progress Report of the United Nations Mediator on Palestine
- Protocol to Prevent, Suppress and Punish Trafficking in Persons, especially Women and Children
- Quartet on the Middle East
- Refugee Day
- Report of the Panel on United Nations Peacekeeping
- United Nations resolution
- Rio Declaration on Environment and Development
- Rockefeller Brothers Fund
- Rockefeller Foundation
- Rockefeller family
- David Rockefeller
- John D. Rockefeller Jr.
- Russia's membership in the United Nations
- United Nations Security Council veto power
- U.S. Committee for the United Nations Development Program
- Seventh emergency special session of the United Nations General Assembly
- Spying on the United Nations
  - Spying on United Nations leaders by United States diplomats
- Standby High-Readiness Brigade
- Stateless person
- Talk:Peacekeeping/Archive
- Ten Threats
- Tenth emergency special session of the United Nations General Assembly
- The Book of Aspirations
- Transnational Organized Crime
- Abibatou Traoré
- UN Administrator for East Timor
- UN ICT Task Force
- UN Regional Groups
- UN Holocaust Memorial
- UN-Energy
- UN-Water
- UNMO
- UNPAN
- UNYA
- Undersecretary-General for Humanitarian Affairs and Emergency Relief Coordinator
- Robert A. Rubinstein
- United Nations 1956 Supplementary Convention on the Abolition of Slavery
- United Nations Association
- United Nations Association UK
- United Nations Association of the United States of America
- United Nations Buffer Zone in Cyprus
- United Nations Car Free Days
- United Nations Charter
- United Nations Command (Korea)
- United Nations Commission on the Status of Women
- United Nations Compensation Commission
- United Nations Conciliation Commission
- United Nations Conference on the Illicit Trade in Small Arms
- United Nations Conference on the Standardization of Geographical Names
- United Nations Confidence Restoration Operation
- United Nations Convention against Corruption
- United Nations Convention on Contracts for the International Sale of Goods
- United Nations Decade of Education for Sustainable Development
- United Nations Democracy Fund
- United Nations Development Corporation
- United Nations Division for Palestinian Rights
- United Nations Economic Commission for Europe
- United Nations Economic Commission for Latin America and the Caribbean
- United Nations Economic and Social Commission for Asia and the Pacific
- United Nations Economic and Social Commission for Western Asia
- United Nations Economic and Social Council
- United Nations General Assembly
- United Nations General Assembly Resolution
- United Nations General Assembly observers
- United Nations Girls' Education Initiative
- United Nations Good Offices Mission in Afghanistan and Pakistan
- United Nations Humanitarian Air Service
- United Nations Humanitarian Response Depot
- United Nations in popular culture
- United Nations Institute for Training and Research
- United Nations Interim Force in Lebanon
- United Nations Interregional Crime and Justice Research Institute
- United Nations Medal
- United Nations Memorial Cemetery
- United Nations Millennium Declaration
- United Nations Millennium Project
- United Nations Office of Internal Oversight Services
- United Nations Participation Act
- United Nations Peace Messenger Cities
- United Nations Postal Administration
- United Nations Prize in the Field of Human Rights
- United Nations Radio
- United Nations Safe Areas
- United Nations Security Council Committee 1267
- UN Security Council Resolution 1325
- United Nations Service Medal
- United Nations Sixth Committee on Aggression
- United Nations Society of Writers
- United Nations Special Committee on Palestine
- United Nations Stabilization Mission in Haiti
- United Nations System of National Accounts
- United Nations Transitional Administration for Eastern Slavonia, Baranja and Western Sirmium
- United Nations Treaty Series
- United Nations Trusteeship Council
- United Nations Yemen Observation Mission
- United Nations Youth Association of Australia
- United Nations list of non-self-governing territories
- United Nations visiting mission to Spanish Sahara
- Vienna International Centre
- WAIPA
- Wendy Chamberlin
- Western European and Others Group
- Working Group on Indigenous Populations
- World Chronicle
- World Conference on Disaster Reduction
- World Federation of United Nations Associations
- World Peace Through World Law
- Template:UN Charter
