= Youth Forum =

Youth Forum may refer to:

== International organizations ==
- Community of Democratic Choice Youth Forum, youth wing of the Community of Democratic Choice
- European Youth Forum, international non-profit advocacy association, adopted by UN and EU
- ITU Youth Forum, youth wing of the International Telecommunication Union, adopted by UN
- World Youth Forum, international NGO based in Egypt, adopted by UN

== Political parties ==
- Law and Justice Youth Forum, youth wing of the Law and Justice Party in Poland
- Madhesi Youth Forum, youth wing of the Madhesi Janadhikar Forum in Nepal
- New Youth Forum, a political party in Hong Kong
- SDP Youth Forum, youth wing of the Social Democratic Party in Croatia
- Youth Forum of Social Democrats, youth wing of the Social Democrats party in Slovenia

== Other uses ==
- Community of Portuguese Language Countries § CPLP Youth Forum, youth wing of the former
- International Science Youth Forum @ Singapore, science enrichment programme for students worldwide
