= Norma Yeeting =

Sexual and reproductive health advocate from Kiribati

- Born: Kiribati
- Education: University of the South Pacific
- Occupation: Reproductive health advocate

Norma Timon Yeeting is a reproductive health advocate from Tarawa, Kiribati.

In 1983 she graduated with a B.A. from the University of the South Pacific.

Yeeting is currently Executive Director of the Kiribati Family Health Association and a leading voice for sexual and reproductive health rights. A prominent nongovernment organisation in the Pacific region, the Association is based in South Tarawa and covers twelve additional islands in Kiribati, reaching around 75% of the country's population. With the organization. Yeeting has helped lead research on heath issues in Kiribati, including cancer awareness in South Tarawa. She has also represented Kiribati in advising other nations in their development cooperation efforts in the Pacific region.

Yeeting has worked for the Kiribati government in the Ministry of Home Affairs and Ministry of Finance & Economic Development. She has also represented Kiribati at the United Nations Commission on Population and Development.
