= Icara 2 =

ICARA 2 or ICARA II: The Second International Conference on Assistance to Refugees in Africa was held at Geneva in July 1984.

This was an attempt that was jointly organized by UNHCR and UNDP, and had as its principal theme "Time for Solutions." The solutions were geared towards refugee flow and remuneration to the nations which assisted in refugee assistance. A Declaration and Programme of Action was directed, aimed at initiating a long-term strategy to deal with Africa's four million refugees and returnees. Going beyond the first International Conference (ICARA I, Geneva, 1981), which focussed primarily on emergency assistance, ICARA II linked humanitarian aid to refugees with the need to help host countries develop their social and economic infrastructures.

It was hoped that international agreement could be found to fund the cost of supporting refugees, only for the meeting to be largely considered a failure.

It was also hoped that the major outcome of this meeting would be the voluntary repatriation of refugees to their homeland. This agreement was based on the thesis that it is cheaper for the donor nations to have the refugee reintegrate with their home nation than to have to support them continually, creating a "welfare system" for refugees.

This information comes directly and indirectly from the UNHCR as well as from Lecture of Barry Stein, expert on Refugees and Internally Displaced Persons at Michigan State University.
