= MONEE Project =

UNICEF launched the MONEE Project (MONitoring Eastern Europe, officially called “Public Policies and Social Conditions: Monitoring the Transition in Central and Eastern Europe and the Commonwealth of Independent States") in 1992 to secure evidence-based feedback on the social impact of market reforms, and to advise countries undergoing rapid political, economic and social change on financial policy. Eight Regional Monitoring Reports (RMRs) were produced by the Innocenti Research Centre between 1993 and 2001, targeting decision-makers, their advisers, academics, professionals and the general audience.

== Reports produced ==
Each Report provides a summary review of the social impact of the economic, political and demographic changes since 1989 and an in-depth analysis of some key thematic issues: family support policies; nutrition, mortality and health; and poverty. RMR 4 offers a framework for assessing and supporting children at risk and those left without parental care, RMR 5 focuses on education, RMR 6 on women, RMR 7 on youth. RMR 8 looks at the turbulent first ten years of the transition. The tradition, facilities, networks, and expectations created by the project have been used since 2002 to produce Innocenti’s new annual ‘Social Monitor’ series, which follows up how the benefits of economic recovery are being shared in the region.

== Budget ==
The Project had an annual budget of US$0.7 million (including also staff posts) covering 27 CEE/CIS countries. The Reports were written by a core staff of 3-5 people at Innocenti, using input and data from a network of focal points in each central statistical office in the region and from other policy consultants; altogether about 40-50 people.

== Results ==
The Project had many results and a variety of outputs (including a stand-alone database, additional research papers, technical support for conferences, website summaries of focus group discussions with young people etc.) The key results were:

- Use by and involvement of top level decision-makers (e.g. the President of Russia making a radio speech, the Duma asking for copies for each parliamentarian, the President of Romania at a conference)
- Exceptional media coverage, citations by academic papers, books, long shelf-life, demand for reprint (RMR 4 had the greatest ever media coverage of any UNICEF publications in Germany)
- Impact on the World Bank and UN sister agencies (e.g. MONEE staff invited to give presentations in Washington, wide-scale use of MONEE data and publications by Bank economists, demonstrated influence on Bank initiatives)
- Use by UNICEF as advocacy tool in and outside the region: for raising awareness on the social impact of economic policies and on emerging threats for children, such as HIV, or for assessing policies and strategies that effectively reduce risks associated with economic shocks, social upheavals and poor family and child support structures and prevent child neglect and institutionalisation.

== Factors contributing to success ==
- Unfailing support from, and involvement of, UNICEF senior management (e.g. the Executive Director, the Regional Director and country Representatives launching MONEE Reports)
- Long project life helping to accumulate capacities, knowledge, networks and fame
- Sufficient funding and stability in core positions
- Professionals with substantive research capacity and ability to create intellectual interest directing the project
- Collaboration with a well-established and well-maintained network including a great number of local and a smaller number of international professionals
- Stakeholders and a focal point for distribution within the World Bank
- Focus on statistical evidence and on producing original, new analysis; at times even pioneering work
- Multi-country coverage, multi-language versions
- Rigorous analyses presented in accessible style
- Strong advocacy involving project staff, media experts and senior UNICEF officials

== Constraints ==
Difficulties included establishing direct contact with statistical agencies in a very few countries; these were overcome with UNICEF field support. While many offices were using project outcomes and networks for advocacy and for programme planning in optimal ways, some others were showing less interest, which hindered project outreach. In several countries no UNICEF offices existed in the field (e.g. Poland, Hungary, Slovenia, and Bulgaria); in these countries National Committees were involved in advocacy, often with excellent results. In some countries (e.g. Russia, Ukraine, Belarus) UNICEF offices were established only after 1997, when the Regional Office for CEE/CIS/Baltics was created.

The MONEE project has demonstrated that by creating a regional monitoring, analytical and advocacy facility, UNICEF can repeatedly and substantially increase awareness on how economic and social policies impact children, women and families and influence how others, including national governments, civil society organizations or the World Bank use their resources and develop their programmes and interventions in a great number of countries.
