= Medical Examination of Young Persons (Underground Work) Convention, 1965 =

International Labour Organization Convention

C124
- ILO Convention
- Date of adoption: 23 June 1965
- Date in force: 13 December 1967
- Classification: Medical Examination
- Subject: Elimination of Child Labour and Protection of Children and Young Persons
- Previous: Minimum Age (Underground Work) Convention, 1965
- Next: Fishermen's Competency Certificates Convention, 1966

Medical Examination of Young Persons (Underground Work) Convention, 1965 is an International Labour Organization Convention.

It was established in 1965, with the preamble stating:

Having decided upon the adoption of certain proposals with regard to medical examination of young persons for fitness for employment underground in mines,...

== Ratifications ==
As of 2022, the convention had been ratified by 41 states.

Country	Date	Status
Argentina	20 Jun 1985	In Force
Austria	8 Dec 1971	In Force
Azerbaijan	19 May 1992	In Force
Belarus	11 Mar 1970	In Force
Belgium	6 May 1977	In Force
Bolivia	31 Jan 1977	In Force
Brazil	21 Aug 1970	In Force
Bulgaria	3 Oct 1969	In Force
Cyprus	18 Jan 1967	In Force
Czech Republic	1 Jan 1993	In Force
Djibouti	3 Aug 1978	In Force
Ecuador	10 Mar 1969	In Force
Finland	23 Sep 1968	In Force
France	5 Aug 1971	In Force
Gabon	18 Oct 1968	In Force
Greece	28 Aug 1981	In Force
Guatemala	13 Jun 1989	In Force
Hungary	8 Jun 1968	In Force
Ireland	10 Jun 1985	In Force
Italy	5 May 1971	In Force
Jordan	6 Jun 1966	In Force
Kyrgyzstan	31 Mar 1992	In Force
Madagascar	23 Oct 1967	In Force
Malta	9 Jun 1988	In Force
Mexico	29 Aug 1968	In Force
Netherlands	8 Apr 1969	In Force
Panama	19 Jun 1970	In Force
Paraguay	10 Jul 1967	In Force
Poland	26 Jun 1968	In Force
Portugal	2 May 1985	In Force
Russian Federation	4 Nov 1969	In Force
Slovakia	1 Jan 1993	In Force
Spain	30 Nov 1971	In Force
Syrian Arab Republic	18 Aug 1972	In Force
Tajikistan	26 Nov 1993	In Force
Tunisia	3 May 1967	In Force
Uganda	23 Jun 1967	In Force
Ukraine	17 Jun 1970	In Force
United Kingdom	13 Dec 1966	In Force
Viet Nam	3 Oct 1994	In Force
Zambia	10 Mar 1967	In Force
