= Philip Sealy =

Trinidad and Tobago ambassador

Philip Sealy was the Permanent Representative (or ambassador) for Trinidad and Tobago to the United Nations. His full title is Ambassador Extraordinary and Plenipotentiary Permanent Representative to the United Nations for the Republic of Trinidad and Tobago.

He presented his credentials to the Secretary-General of the United Nations, Kofi Annan, on 1 October 2002. Ambassador Philip Sealy retired in 2010 and was replaced by Marina Valere. Prior to this appointment, he was his nation's ambassador to Venezuela.
