= United Nations General Assembly Resolution 37/37 =

UN General Assembly Resolution 37/37
- Date: 29 November 1982
- Meeting no.: A/37/PV.82
- Code: A/RES/37/37 (Document)
- Subject: The situation in Afghanistan and its implications for international peace and security
- Voting summary: 114 voted for; 13 voted against; 21 abstained
- Result: Adopted

United Nations General Assembly Resolution 37/37 (1983) stated that the Soviet Union forces should withdraw from Afghanistan. It was the fourth time in three years that the General Assembly had called for Soviet withdrawal from that country.
