= Maximum Weight Convention, 1967 =

International Labour Organization Convention

C127
- ILO Convention
- Date of adoption: June 28, 1967
- Date in force: March 1970
- Classification: Physical Hazards, Noise and Vibration
- Subject: Occupational Safety and Health
- Previous: Accommodation of Crews (Fishermen) Convention, 1966
- Next: Invalidity, Old-Age and Survivors' Benefits Convention, 1967

Maximum Weight Convention, 1967 is an International Labour Organization Convention.

It was established in 1967, with the preamble stating:

Having decided upon the adoption of certain proposals with regard to maximum permissible weight to be carried by one worker,...

== Ratifications ==
As of 2013, the convention was ratified by 29 countries.
