= Latin American involvement in international peacekeeping =

Latin American involvement in international peacekeeping dates back to the start of United Nations peacekeeping efforts with the Organization's founding in the 1940s but has seen a sharp acceleration in recent years.

The military establishments of the larger nations of Latin America (with the notable exception of Mexico) have consistently supported most of the major peacekeeping missions of the United Nations. In some cases (Argentina, Chile), this has been a long-term historic commitment of a few (3-6) observers in missions that have been supported from the late 1940s to date. In other cases the support has taken the form of major units (at least a battalion in the range of 500-700 personnel), generally for periods of a year. This Latin American support effort has accelerated in the past few years as the UN has taken a more activist and interventionist stance in the peacekeeping field (with some key individuals calling for the UN to be prepared to do peace-enforcement as well as peace-keeping). At least one army (Argentina's) now formally includes such peacekeeping support as one of its basic missions, and others have assumed de facto peacekeeping roles with an extended commitment into the future. Since it is reasonable to assume that such calls for troop contributions for UN peacekeeping missions will continue and even increase in the future, this role will probably be of growing significance.

== Historical precedents ==
UNHCR Headquarters, Estelí, Nicaragua

Over the years the Latin American support of UN peacekeeping and peace-observing missions has ranked after the principal troop contributors (the Scandinavian countries, Ireland, New Zealand, India and Canada), and well above that of most of the UN membership. In UNEF I (Egypt-Israel, 1956-1967) Brazil provided a battalion for almost ten years (for a total participation of some 5,000 man-years), and Colombia a similar unit for a year; a Brazilian general commanded UNEF twice in this period. After the 1973 Middle East War both Panama and Peru provided a battalion to UNEF II for a year. A Peruvian officer also commanded the observer unit in the Golan Heights in this period. Colombia also provided a battalion and a naval ship during the UN's only previous experience with peace-enforcement, the Korean War, while Argentina sent two warships on blockade duty during the first Gulf War. Colombia and Uruguay have also provided significant troop units (a battalion of infantry and an engineer unit, respectively), to the Multinational Force and Observers (MFO) which has acted as third-party peace-observers in the Sinai desert on the border between Egypt and Israel since 1982 (although this particular mission was mandated by the Camp David Accords, and is not a UN effort).

== Recent involvement in UN peacekeeping and peace-observing efforts ==
- UN Truce Supervision Organization (UNTSO, Middle East) 1948-date: observers from Argentina and Chile.
- UN Military Observer Group in India and Pakistan (UNMOGIP) 1949-date: observers from Argentina, Chile and Uruguay.
- UN Observer Mission in Central America (ONUCA) 1990-1992: observers came from Brazil (21), Colombia (12), Ecuador (21), and Venezuela (14). Venezuela contributed a battalion (approximately 800 men) during Contra demobilization, and Argentina provided four patrol craft and 30 naval personnel for ONUCA's Gulf of Fonseca operation.
- UN Iraq-Kuwait Observation Mission (UNIKOM) 1991-2003 : observers from Argentina (7), Uruguay (8) and Venezuela (7), as well as a helicopter unit from Chile (50 personnel).
- UN Angola Verification Mission (UNAVEM II) 1991-date: observers from Argentina (7), Brazil (6).
- UN Observer Mission in El Salvador (ONUSAL) 1991-date: Police trainers and observers came from Chile, Mexico and Guyana, while military observers were provided by Brazil, Colombia, Ecuador, and Venezuela; Argentina sent military medical officers.
- UN Mission for the Referendum in Western Sahara (MINURSO) 1991-date: Argentina, El Salvador, Honduras, Uruguay, Mexico, Peru, Venezuela, Honduras.
- UN Transitional Authority in Cambodia (UNTAC) 1992-1993: Argentina, Chile (troops), Uruguay (troops), Brazil, Costa Rica, Ecuador, Venezuela.
- UN Protection Force, Croatia (UNPROFOR) 1992-1995: observers from Brazil, Colombia and Venezuela. Argentina has sent a battalion plus staff officers for a total of over 900 personnel.
- UN Operation in Somalia (UNOSOM) 1992-1995: military medical personnel from Argentina.
- UN Mission in Haiti (UNMIH), 1993–1996: Argentina, Guatemala, Honduras
- UN Angola Verification Mission III (UNAVEM III), 1995–1997 Brazil: 739 troops; 20 military observers; 14 civilian police
- UN Verification Mission in Guatemala (MINUGUA) 1997: Argentina, Brazil, Ecuador, Uruguay and Venezuela
- UN Civilian Police Mission in Haiti (MIPONUH), 1997–2000: Argentina
- UN Mission in the Democratic Republic of the Congo (MONUC) 1999-date: Bolivia, Guatemala, Paraguay, Peru,
- UN Mission in Ethiopia and Eritrea (UNMEE) 2000-present: Bolivia, Brazil, Guatemala, Paraguay, Peru, Uruguay
- UN Support in East Timor (UNMISET), 2002-2005: Argentina, Bolivia, Brazil, Chile, Peru, Uruguay
- UN Mission in Liberia (UNMIL) 2003–present: Bolivia, Ecuador, El Salvador, Paraguay, Peru
- UN Operation in Côte d'Ivoire (UNOCI) 2004–present. Argentina, Bolivia, Brazil, Dominican Republic, Ecuador, El Salvador, Guatemala, Paraguay, Peru, Uruguay
- UN Stabilization Mission in Haiti (MINUSTAH) 2004–2017: Argentina, Bolivia, Brazil, Chile, Colombia, Ecuador, El Salvador, Guatemala, Mexico, Paraguay, Peru, Uruguay
- UN Mission in the Sudan (UNMIS) 2005–present: Argentina, Bolivia, Brazil, Ecuador, El Salvador, Guatemala, Paraguay, Peru, Uruguay,
- United Nations Multidimensional Integrated Stabilization Mission in the Central African Republic (MINUSCA), Mexico

== The Argentine experience ==
Argentina has in the past few years been one of the most consistent supporters of UN peacekeeping (as well as the UN/coalition effort in the Gulf War). This involvement is due in large measure to a deliberate policy by the Alfonsín and Menem administrations to get their nation, and its military institutions, involved in this type of extra-Hemispheric UN mission. The Argentine effort also reflects the fact that UN peacekeeping is now part of their formal role statement (Canada takes a similar approach). The Argentine army defines its basic mission, similar to that of most armies, as the defense of state sovereignty by providing a credible deterrent against a hypothetical adversary. But they also have several secondary missions, the first of which is participation in international peace missions (other secondary missions include assistance in case of natural disasters and support in the struggle against narco-subversion). An important influence is Spain, which, like Argentina, has made a difficult transition from authoritarian rule to democracy, and whose military institutions have also assumed a major role in UN peacekeeping in recent years, most notably in Central America. The contacts between Spanish and Latin American officers have increased through these UN peacekeeping missions, with mutual reinforcement concerning the value of such missions for their militaries.

== Motivation and impact ==
Assessing the motivation and impact of these peacekeeping missions is somewhat speculative. It is possible to assume idealistic motivations such as support for the world body and altruistic contributions to the achievement of peace. It is also true that individual military personnel usually profit financially from UN service, as do many of their governments, depending on the arrangements made with UN Headquarters. The military institutions also benefit by the training and exposure that they derive from such service. From a national perspective, service in UN peacekeeping missions tends to elevate the profile and prestige of the country. Finally, for a military institution like Argentina's, still laden with the baggage of years of military dictatorship, the "Dirty War", and the fiasco of the Falklands/Malvinas defeat, involvement in UN peacekeeping offers the opportunity to recover some of the prestige and self-respect lost after many years of negative image in the world and in their own country. Service in UN peacekeeping missions also reinforces the ties of military transnationalism by building on the camaraderie of shared experiences with soldiers of many nations.
