= Pavel Palazhchenko =

Soviet interpreter (born 1949)

- Па́вел Пала́жченко
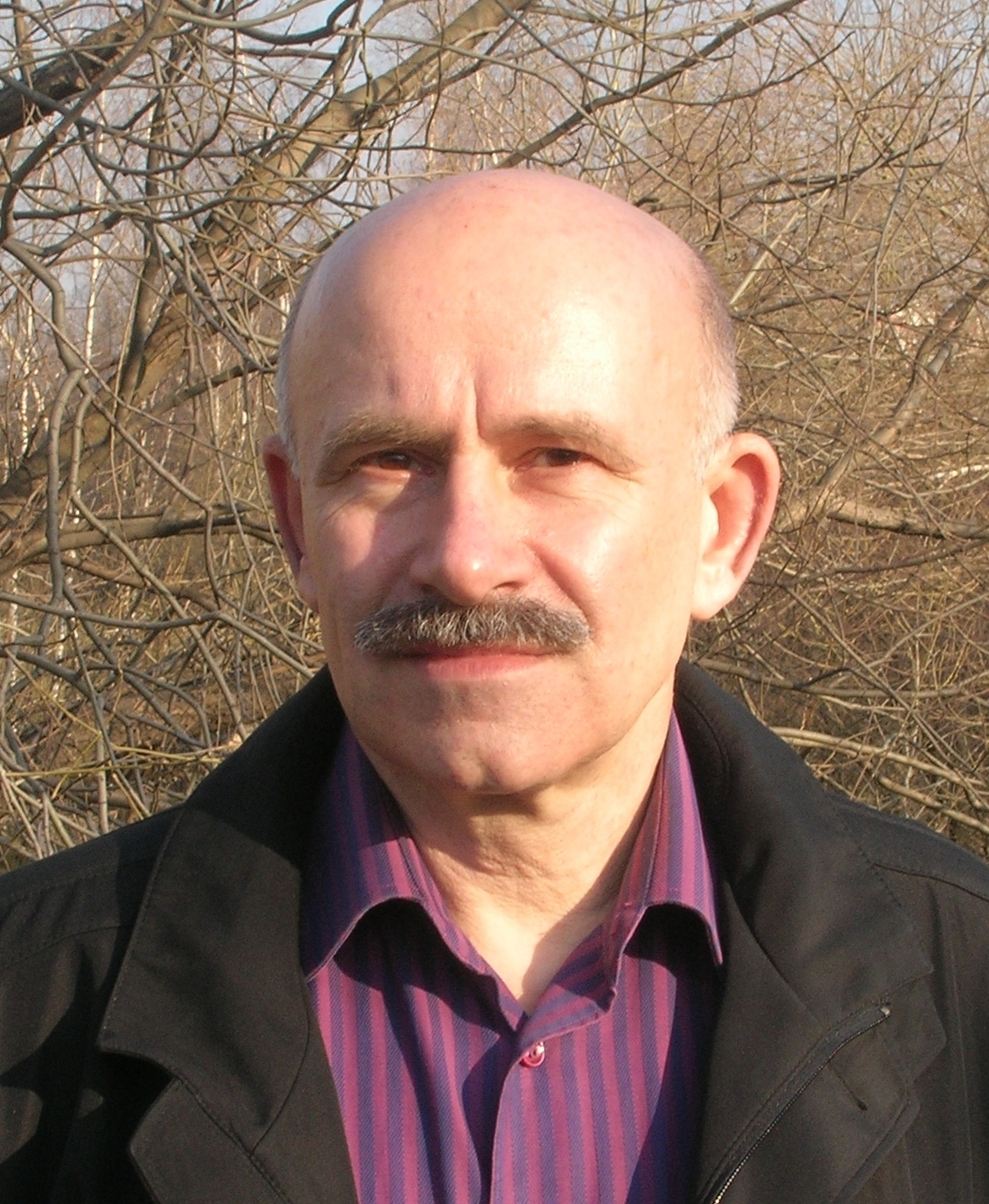
- Palazhchenko in 2011
- Born: 17 March 1949 (age 77); Monino, Moscow Oblast, Russian SFSR, Soviet Union
- Education: Maurice Thorez Moscow Institute of Foreign Languages
- Occupation: Interpreter
- Website: pavelpal.ru (in Russian)

Pavel Palazhchenko or Palazchenko (Russian: Па́вел Русла́нович Пала́жченко, born 17 March 1949) is a former high-level Soviet conference interpreter who was the chief English interpreter for Mikhail Gorbachev and Soviet foreign minister Eduard Shevardnadze from 1985 and 1991.

== Biography ==
=== Personal ===
Palazhchenko was born on 17 March 1949 in Monino, Moscow Oblast, Russia. He graduated from the Maurice Thorez Moscow Institute of Foreign Languages (Moscow State Linguistic University) in 1972.

=== Interpreter ===
External videos
- Booknotes interview with Palazhchenko on My Years with Gorbachev and Shevardnadze: The Memoir of a Soviet Interpreter, 8 June 1997, C-SPAN

As one of the leading interpreters of his time, Palazhchenko participated in all US-Soviet summit talks leading to the end of the Cold War. He is the author of a personal and political memoir, My Years with Gorbachev and Shevardnadze: The Memoir of a Soviet Interpreter.

In 1997, he helped Larry Ray arrange a New York City Hall meeting between Mayor Rudolph Giuliani and Gorbachev, after he had become friends with Ray. Years later, Ray was convicted of sex trafficking, extortion, forced labor, conspiracy, money laundering, and other offenses, and sentenced to 60 years in prison.

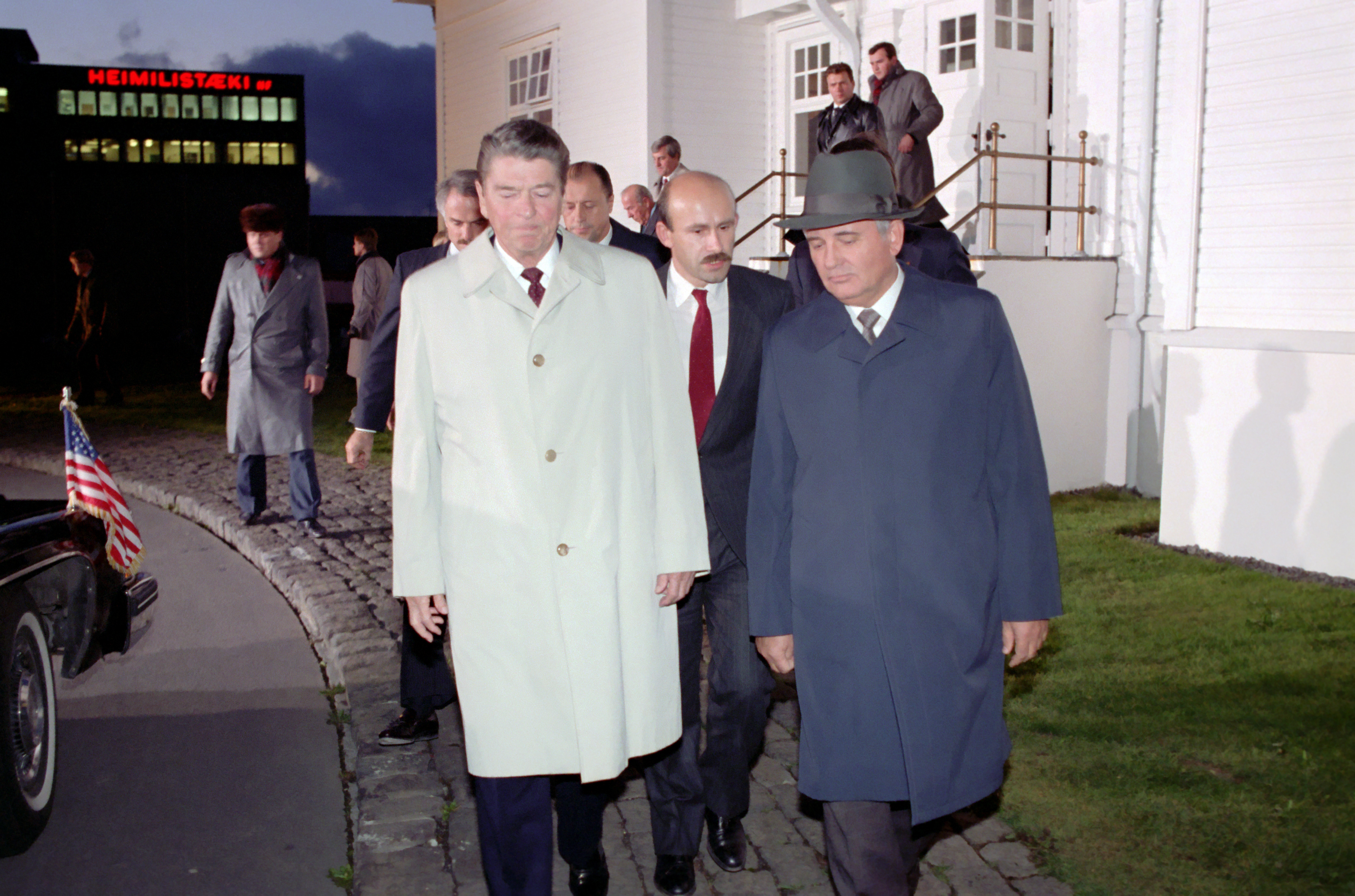
Reagan, Palazhchenko and Gorbachev at Hofdi House, Reykjavík, Iceland, 1986

=== Writer ===
Palazhchenko also wrote the Moi Nesistematichesky Slovar or My Unsystematic Dictionary which was published in Russia by R. Valent publications in May 2002. The 300-page Russian-English dictionary provides information, insight and cultural observation on the linguistic twists and turns that lie between the English and Russian languages; and was a sequel to Palazhchenko’s other work: the English-Russian dictionary published in 1999. The 1999 English-Russian dictionary dealt with trends in the political, diplomatic and journalistic usage in the English language.

Palazhchenko speaks passionately about his trade. In his book, My Unsystematic Dictionary, Palazhchenko writes:

This very occupation, to imbibe the air of a foreign (and your own) language, to rake through the throng of words and, having found the right one, feel its texture, its size and then grope for the threads connecting the two languages, has always been my favorite thing to do…

In 2005, the third book of this series, Unsystematic Dictionary-2005 was published.

=== Associate ===
After becoming a long-time associate and aide to Mikhail Gorbachev for several years, Palazhchenko eventually became the head of the International Department of the International Non-governmental Foundation for Socio-Economic and Political Studies (or The Gorbachev Foundation), where he also functioned as an analyst, spokesperson, interpreter and translator.

== See also ==
- Igor Korchilov, UN Interpreter
- United Nations Interpretation Service
