= U.S. Committee for the United Nations Development Program =

The U.S. Committee for the United Nations Development Program (UNDP-USA) was an independent 501(c)(3) organization and one of several "friends of" organizations in the United Nations (UN) family, dedicated to the promotion of the UN and its goals. Founded in 1995, UNDP-USA was the officially recognized NGO in the United States for the UNDP, supporting the goals of the agency, and the UN in general, while helping to inform the American people about the work of the UN. The U.S. Committee's stated goal was to help construct a world in which Americans are well-educated about the vital importance of international development activities to the building of a more democratic, prosperous, peaceful, and united planet.

After 14 years of work, the U.S. Committee for the United States Development Program closed in December 2009.

Please visit the UNDP Washington Representation Office website for information on UNDP's role in the United States.

== See also ==
- United Nations
- United Nations Development Programme
- International development
- United Nations Association of the United States of America
