= Callixte Gakwaya =

Rwandan lawyer

Callixte Gakwaya (died 14 September 2007) was a Rwandan lawyer who was defence counsel at the International Criminal Tribunal for Rwanda (ICTR) for Yusuf Munyakazi, a former businessman from Cyangugu. Prior to this, Gakwaya was an official in the national sports ministry and the head of the Irindiro Ballet of Rwanda.

On 28 February 2006, Gakwaya's appointment to the ICTR garnered controversy when Aloys Mutabingwa, Rwanda's representative to the ICTR, revealed that Gakwaya was himself on a list of genocide suspects previously released by the Rwandan government to Interpol.

However, Gakwaya was not among the suspects named by the ICTR, and for this reason the Rwandan government requested he be extradited from Arusha to Rwanda. Rwandan authorities had never voiced their suspicions before Gakwaya was appointed lead attorney. He used to work as an assistant lawyer within the defence team of Eliézer Niyitegeka, a former minister sentenced to life imprisonment.

In September 2006, Rwanda threatened to cut off all contact with the ICTR unless Gakwaya was fired. Gakwaya resigned on 18 September 2006.
