= Spying on the United Nations =

Espionage against the United Nations

Various states have committed espionage against the United Nations since its foundation in 1945. The UN claims that such acts are illegal under a number of international treaties, including the 1946 Convention on the Privileges and Immunities of the United Nations, the 1947 agreement between the United Nations and the United States, and the 1961 Vienna Convention on Diplomatic Relations.

In one notable incident, the US and other Western countries were found to be spying on the UN in March 2003, in the run-up to the Iraq War, and actual bugging devices were found inside the UN. In 2010, leaked diplomatic cables revealed that US diplomats had been spying on UN leaders. On 25 August 2013, Der Spiegel revealed US National Security Agency secretly monitored the U.N.'s internal video conferencing system via decryption in 2012.

== Countries ==
=== United States ===
In 2008, the British newspaper The Observer published an investigative report revealing that the National Security Agency (NSA) of the United States was conducting a secret surveillance operation directed at intercepting the telephone and email communications of several U.N. Security Council diplomats, both in their offices and in their homes. This campaign, the result of a directive by National Security Advisor Condoleezza Rice, was aimed primarily at the delegations from Angola, Cameroon, Chile, Mexico, Guinea and Pakistan. The investigative report cited an NSA memo which advised senior agency officials that it was "mounting a surge" aimed at gleaning information not only on how delegations on the Security Council would vote on any second resolution on Iraq, but also "policies", "negotiating positions", "alliances" and "dependencies" – the "whole gamut of information that could give US policymakers an edge in obtaining results favourable to US goals or to head off surprises".

The authenticity of this memo has been called into question by many in the US and it is still unclear as to whether or not it is legitimate.

A young translator for Britain's Government Communications Headquarters (GCHQ), Katharine Gun, leaked the memo to the Observer because she believed the war was illegal. She was fired from her job at GCHQ. Gun was arrested and accused of violating the Official Secrets Act 1989, but charges were dropped after the prosecution presented no evidence.

According to documents leaked by Edward Snowden the NSA successfully cracked the encryption guarding the United Nations' internal videoconferencing system in the summer of 2012.

==== Allegations of spying by United States diplomats ====
Spying on United Nations leaders by United States diplomats was ordered by a 2009 confidential directive from the United States Department of State directly instructing US diplomats to spy on top officials of the United Nations. The intelligence information to be gathered included biometric information and passwords and other authentication keys used in official communications. The directives were revealed as part of the United States diplomatic cables leak in late 2010. According to former U.S. officials, the instructions given in these cables may have been largely ignored by American diplomats as ill-advised. The former British ambassador to the United States, said that it would be a "serious misinterpretation" to conclude that the cables were asking diplomats to spy, calling it part of the vast bureaucratic laundry list dumped on diplomats.

The disclosed cables on the more aggressive intelligence gathering went back to 2008 when they went out under Condoleezza Rice's name during her tenure as Secretary of State and continued to go out under US Secretary of State Hillary Clinton's name. US State Department spokesman Philip J. Crowley stated that Clinton had not drafted the directive and that the Secretary of State's name is systematically attached to the bottom of cables originating from Washington. Further leaked material revealed that the guidance in the cables was actually written by the Central Intelligence Agency before being sent out under Clinton's name, as the CIA cannot directly instruct State Department personnel. Specifically, the effort came from the National Clandestine Service, a CIA service formed in the years following the September 11 attacks with the goal of better coordinating human intelligence activities.

The UN had previously declared that spying on the secretary-general was illegal, as a breach of the 1946 UN convention. Peter Kemp, Solicitor of the Supreme Court of New South Wales, and international-law professor Ben Saul, publicly asked Julia Gillard, Prime Minister of Australia, to complain "to the U.S. about both Secretaries of State Condoleezza Rice and Hillary Clinton being in major breach of International law ie UN Covenants, by making orders to spy on UN personnel, including the Secretary General, to include theft of their credit card details and communication passwords. Perhaps the Attorney General should investigate this clear prima facie evidence of crime (likely against Australian diplomats as well), rather than he attempts to prosecute the messenger of those crimes." President of Venezuela Hugo Chávez said that Clinton should resign.

The practice of the US and the State Department gathering intelligence on the UN was not new. Former UN diplomats commented that UN officials already work under the assumption that they are spied on and are used to getting around it, but that it was the responsibility of intelligence agencies, not other diplomats. The Guardian wrote that the directive "appears to blur the line between diplomacy and spying".

Staff at the UN privately expressed unhappiness at the apparent scale of the intelligence-gathering operation, and the UN sought an official explanation from the US. On 1 December, Clinton and Ban met at a summit of the Organization for Security and Co-operation in Europe in Astana, Kazakhstan, where Clinton was doing damage control with world leaders regarding the embarrassing contents of the State Department cables overall. In an attempt to repair the strain for the Humint revelations, Clinton expressed regret for the disclosures, but did not make an apology per se. A UN statement relayed that Ban thanked Clinton "for clarifying the matter and for expressing her concern about the difficulties created."

Germany Ministry of the Interior Thomas de Maizière said he was "astounded" by the order, though he expressed regret that Wikileaks activity was being focused on "transparent and open Western democracies" instead of "the world's dictatorships and oppressive regimes" and thus lacked "genuine informative purpose". Former US official Carl Ford called the order "unprecedented", although "other U.S. diplomats said such headquarters directives were a longtime and routine practice", albeit one which was "not always fully obeyed."

The Guardian quoted Carne Ross, "a former British diplomat at the UN who now runs the Independent Diplomat advisory group", as saying that "The fact that the US is spying on the UN can't be a surprise. Lots of countries do it, including our own." Christopher Meyer, a former British ambassador to the United States, said that it would be a "serious misinterpretation" to conclude that the cables were asking diplomats to spy, adding that "In reality this is the usual vast bureaucratic laundry list dumped by the US intelligence establishment on diplomats around the world asking them to do a number of things".

=== United Kingdom ===
Clare Short, a British cabinet minister who resigned in May 2003 over the war, stated in media interviews that British intelligence regularly spied on UN officials. She stated that she had read transcripts of Kofi Annan's conversations.

On 26 February 2004 Short alleged on the BBC Today radio programme that British spies regularly intercept UN communications, including those of Kofi Annan, its Secretary-General. The revelation came the day after the unexplained dropping of whistleblowing charges against former GCHQ translator Katharine Gun. Reacting to Short's statement, Tony Blair said "I really do regard what Clare Short has said this morning as totally irresponsible, and entirely consistent [with Short's character]." Blair also claimed that Short had put UK security, particularly the security of its spies, at risk. The same day, on the BBC's Newsnight programme, Short called Blair's response "pompous" and said that Britain had no need to spy on Kofi Annan. Blair did not explicitly deny the claims but Robin Cook, former Foreign Secretary, wrote that in his experience he would be surprised if the claims were true.

A few days later (on 29 February 2004) Ms Short appeared on ITV's Jonathan Dimbleby programme. She revealed that she had been written to by Britain's senior civil servant, Cabinet Secretary Andrew Turnbull. Turnbull's confidential letter (which Short showed to Dimbleby, and which was quoted on the programme) formally admonished her for discussing intelligence matters in the media, and threatened "further action" if she did not desist from giving interviews on the issue. Turnbull wrote that she had made claims "which damage the interests of the United Kingdom", and that he was "extremely disappointed". The "further action" referred to in the letter has been interpreted as threatening either the removal of Short's status as a Privy Counsellor or to legal action under the Official Secrets Act. Either course of action would be without recent precedent; the last time a Privy Counsellor's status was revoked was in 1921 when Sir Edgar Speyer was accused of collaborating with the Germans during the First World War. However, on 1 March 2004, Tony Blair's official spokesman refused to rule out such a step.

However, in the same interview on the Jonathan Dimbleby programme, Short backtracked on her claim about British agents bugging Mr Annan. She admitted that the transcripts she saw of Mr Annan's private conversations might have related to Africa and not to Iraq. Asked whether she could confirm that the transcripts related to Iraq, she said: "I can't, but there might well have been ... I cannot remember a specific transcript in relation, it doesn't mean it wasn't there." Short also admitted that her original claim, on the Today programme, that Britain had eavesdropped on Mr Annan may have been inaccurate. Asked whether the material could have passed to the British by the Americans, she said: "It could. But it normally indicates that. But I can't remember that."

=== Australia ===
Australia reportedly received transcripts from the US and British phone-tapping operations against UN Secretary-General Kofi Annan and another top UN figure, Hans Blix via phone-tapping. Australia also allegedly assisted the bugging with spy satellites connected to the Pine Gap relay centre near Alice Springs.

=== Israel ===
British writer Gordon Thomas alleges that Mossad, Israel's foreign intelligence service, sees penetrating all UN diplomatic missions as a task of its New York katsa.

=== Cyprus ===
Cypriot intelligence is alleged to have stolen 6,500 UN documents containing sensitive information on its negotiations with Turkish Cypriot leaders. An internal UN investigation reportedly concluded that the theft was the work of the Cyprus Intelligence Service (CIS). The operation was reportedly headed by a CIS agent who befriended Sonja Bachmann, a senior aide to Alexander Downer, an Australian politician who served as an adviser to UN Secretary-General Ban Ki-moon and the special rapporteur on the Cyprus negotiations. The agent allegedly obtained Bachmann's email login information, allowing a CIS team to access Downer's email several times while he was away on UN business.

Subsequently, stolen documents were leaked to the press, and the UN investigation concluded that the Cypriots leaked the documents in the hope of undermining the role of Downer, who was seen as being too closely aligned to Turkish Cypriots.

=== Morocco ===
In a 28-page report to the UN Security Council on the situation in Western Sahara and on the situation faced by MINURSO, the UN monitoring force in the region, Secretary-General Ban Ki-moon wrote that Moroccan intelligence was intercepting MINURSO communications.

== See also ==
- United Nations Security Council and the Iraq War
- F. Mark Wyatt
