= Final Articles Revision Convention, 1961 =

International Labour Organization Convention

C116
- ILO Convention
- Date of adoption: 26 June 1961
- Date in force: 5 February 1962
- Classification: General Provisions
- Subject: Not Classified
- Previous: Radiation Protection Convention, 1960
- Next: Social Policy (Basic Aims and Standards) Convention, 1962

Final Articles Revision Convention, 1961 is an International Labour Organization Convention.

It was established in 1961, with the preamble stating:

Having decided upon the adoption of certain proposals with regard to the partial revision of the Conventions adopted by the General Conference of the International Labour Organisation at its first thirty-two sessions for the purpose of standardising the provisions regarding the preparation of reports by the Governing Body of the International Labour Office on the working of Conventions,...

== Ratifications ==
As of 2022, the convention has been ratified by 77 states.

Country	Date	Status
Australia	29 Oct 1963	In Force
Austria	14 Nov 1963	In Force
Azerbaijan	19 May 1992	In Force
Bangladesh	22 Jun 1972	In Force
Belarus	11 Mar 1970	In Force
Bolivia	12 Jan 1965	In Force
Bosnia and Herzegovina	02 Jun 1993	In Force
Brazil	05 Sep 1966	In Force
Bulgaria	03 Oct 1969	In Force
Burkina Faso	16 Apr 1962	In Force
Cameroon	29 Dec 1964	In Force
Central African Republic	10 Jun 1963	In Force
Colombia	04 Mar 1969	In Force
Croatia	08 Oct 1991	In Force
Cuba	05 Feb 1971	In Force
Cyprus	20 Jul 1964	In Force
Czech Republic	01 Jan 1993	In Force
Democratic Republic of the Congo	05 Sep 1967	In Force
Denmark	10 Jul 1962	In Force
Ecuador	10 Mar 1969	In Force
Egypt	26 Mar 1962	In Force
Ethiopia	11 Jun 1966	In Force
Finland	01 Jun 1964	In Force
France	08 Jun 1967	In Force
Germany	07 Oct 1963	In Force
Ghana	27 Aug 1963	In Force
Guatemala	25 Jan 1965	In Force
Honduras	17 Nov 1964	In Force
India	21 Jun 1962	In Force
Iraq	26 Oct 1962	In Force
Ireland	27 Feb 1963	In Force
Israel	24 May 1963	In Force
Ivory Coast	02 Jan 1963	In Force
Jordan	04 Jul 1963	In Force
Kuwait	23 Apr 1963	In Force
Kyrgyzstan	31 Mar 1992	In Force
Lithuania	26 Sep 1994	In Force
Luxembourg	04 Mar 1964	In Force
Madagascar	01 Jun 1964	In Force
Mauritania	08 Nov 1963	In Force
Mexico	03 Nov 1966	In Force
Montenegro	03 Jun 2006	In Force
Netherlands	13 Nov 1964	In Force
New Zealand	01 Mar 1963	In Force
Niger	23 Mar 1962	In Force
Nigeria	27 Jun 1962	In Force
North Macedonia	17 Nov 1991	In Force
Pakistan	17 Nov 1967	In Force
Panama	19 Jun 1970	In Force
Paraguay	20 Feb 1969	In Force
Poland	22 Apr 1964	In Force
Romania	09 Apr 1965	In Force
Russian Federation	04 Nov 1969	In Force
Senegal	13 Nov 1967	In Force
Serbia	24 Nov 2000	In Force
Slovakia	01 Jan 1993	In Force
Slovenia	29 May 1992	In Force
South Africa	09 Aug 1963	In Force
Spain	17 Jul 1962	In Force
Sri Lanka	26 Apr 1974	In Force
Sweden	03 Apr 1962	In Force
Switzerland	05 Nov 1962	In Force
Syrian Arab Republic	10 Aug 1965	In Force
Tajikistan	26 Nov 1993	In Force
Thailand	24 Sep 1962	In Force
Tunisia	15 Jan 1962	In Force
Turkey	02 Sep 1968	In Force
Ukraine	17 Jun 1970	In Force
United Kingdom	09 Mar 1962	In Force
Uruguay	28 Jun 1973	In Force
Venezuela	16 Nov 1964	In Force
Viet Nam	03 Oct 1994	In Force
