= Guarding of Machinery Convention, 1963 =

International Labour Organization Convention

C119
- ILO Convention
- Date of adoption: June 25, 1963
- Date in force: April 21, 1965
- Classification: Physical Hazards, Noise and Vibration
- Subject: Occupational Safety and Health
- Previous: Equality of Treatment (Social Security) Convention, 1962
- Next: Hygiene (Commerce and Offices) Convention, 1964

Guarding of Machinery Convention, 1963 is an International Labour Organization Convention.

It was established in 1963, with the preamble stating:

Having decided upon the adoption of certain proposals with regard to the prohibition of the sale, hire and use of inadequately guarded machinery,...

== Ratifications ==
As of 2013, the convention has been ratified by 52 states.
