= Marc Bélanger (trade unionist) =

Canadian trade unionist

Marc Bélanger (born 1950) is a labour union educator specializing in information technology and distance education via computer communications. He worked for the Workers' Activities Programme of the training centre of the International Labour Organization (ILO) in Turin, Italy, from 2000-08. He was head of the Programme from 2007-08. The Programme objective is to help build the capacities of unions in developing countries.

== Biography ==
He has a degree in journalism from Ryerson Polytechnical Institute, a Master's in media studies from The New School and a PhD in computer communications from Simon Fraser University.

Before joining the ILO in 2000 Bélanger worked for the Canadian Union of Public Employees (CUPE). For the first ten years of his career at CUPE he was a communications specialist assigned to support negotiators and local unions during strikes. During the last 15 years he was director of the union's computer department. During his time in the computer department he organized the first local area network in Canada and created SoliNet - the Solidarity Network. SoliNet, established in 1985, was a union-owned and operated computer communications system. It was used for the first online labour education courses, including university-credit courses, and international workshops. It spawned a number of labour-related projects including the labour news service LabourStart.

In 1995 Bélanger earned a university degree completely via computer communications through Connected Education's program with The New School. Also in 1995 he became a founding director of Canada's Telelearning Network of Centres of Excellence (a national research network concerning distance education via computer communications funded by the Canadian government). He has written on labour and technology, labour education, the digital development of African unions and the international labour movement.
