= Equality of Treatment (Social Security) Convention, 1962 =

International Labour Organization Convention

C118
- ILO Convention
- Date of adoption: June 28, 1962
- Date in force: April 25, 1964
- Classification: Social Security
- Subject: Social Security
- Previous: Social Policy (Basic Aims and Standards) Convention, 1962
- Next: Guarding of Machinery Convention, 1963

Equality of Treatment (Social Security) Convention, 1962 is an International Labour Organization Convention.

It was established in 1962, with the preamble stating:

Having decided upon the adoption of certain proposals with regard to equality of treatment of nationals and non-nationals in social security,...

== Ratifications ==
As of 2013, the treaty has been ratified by 38 states. One of these ratifying states—the Netherlands (for the Kingdom in Europe only)—has denounced the treaty.
