= Anna Di Lellio =

American writer

- Education: University of Perugia BA; New York University MA; Columbia University MA & PhD
- Occupation: Sociologist

Anna Di Lellio is a sociologist, journalist and former United Nations consultant. She has written on a number of topics relating to the United Nations' presence in Kosovo and Iraq.

== Biography ==
Di Lellio received a B.A. in Philosophy from the University of Perugia in Italy, and a Masters in Public Policy and International Affairs from New York University. She also completed a Masters degree and PhD in sociology from Columbia University.

She worked for the UN World Food Programme as a consultant in Kosovo and East Timor during the 1999 emergencies. Later, she was a research analyst for the International Organization for Migration on the Kosovo Liberation Army (KLA) programme of reintegration, and political advisor to the UN Kosovo Police Corps Coordinator.

From 2001 through 2003, she was the Temporary Media Commissioner of Kosovo for the Organisation for Economic Co-operation and Development (OSCE). In this capacity, she authored two reports on media law and policy in post-conflict areas. On her return to New York, she was appointed as Director of Communications to Paul Volcker's inquiry into possible corruption in the Iraqi Oil-for-Food Programme. She resigned her post in September 2004 following a controversy over a 2002 newspaper article in The Guardian in which she criticized George W. Bush and Silvio Berlusconi.

She is the editor of the book The Case for Kosova: Passage to Independence (2000), an anthology of essays on the future of Kosovo, and the author of The Battle of Kosovo 1389: An Albanian Epic (2009).

She is the co-founder of the Kosovo Oral History Initiative (KOHI), a public multi- lingual and multi-media virtual archive of Kosovo history that focuses on individual life stories.

She is an adjunct professor at the International Relations Program of New York University, and also teaches at the New School for Public Engagement.

According to historian Dušan Bataković, In her writings, Di Lellio takes a pro-Albanian stance. University professor and byzantist Radivoj Radić has written negatively about her work, stating to have "demonstrated her ignorance and discord with historical methodology on multiple occasions".
