= Raymond Mikesell =

American economist (1913–2006)

Raymond Frech Mikesell (February 13, 1913 – September 12, 2006) was an economics professor at the University of Oregon and was believed to be the last surviving economist from the Bretton Woods Conference.

== Biography ==
Mikesell was born in Eaton, Ohio. He received a bachelor's degree from Ohio State University (OSU) and, in 1939, received a doctorate in economics from OSU. From 1937 to 1941, he was assistant professor at the University of Washington.

During World War II, Mikesell became an adviser to Assistant Treasury Secretary Harry Dexter White. Mikesell was a member of the technical staff at the Bretton Woods Conference, which resulted in the creation of the World Bank and the International Monetary Fund. In his Bretton Woods Debates: A Memoir, Mikesell notes that he provided White with data that supported the United States' free trade position and calculated the initial quotas for the World Bank and IMF. He was a close friend of White, Frank Coe, and Sol Adler, and believed that they were not Communist sympathizers.

Mikesell served the U.S. government in a number of capacities, including serving as representative of the United States Treasury Department in Cairo in 1943–44 and as the U.S. delegate to the Middle East Financial Conference in Cairo (April, 1944); as a member of the United States Currency Mission to Saudi Arabia (1948); as member of the staff of the National Commission on Materials Policy; and Chief of the Foreign Resources Division (1951). He also served as an economic adviser to the Joint British-American Cabinet Committee on Palestine.

He served as a consultant to the World Bank, the United Nations and the Organization of American States. He later argued for reform of the International Monetary Fund and abolishment of the World Bank, which he thought had become a useless and expensive bureaucracy. He was a member of the editorial board on the Middle East Journal from 1947.

Mikesell joined the University of Virginia department of Economics as professor in 1946 and accepted the W.E. Miner Chair at the University of Oregon in 1957, where he taught until 1993. He served as vice president for the Academy of International Business on the 1971–1972 board and was elected as an AIB Fellow in 1981. He was an avid tennis player and active outdoorsman, and he often took his doctoral students hiking before advising them on their dissertations as they sat around a campfire.

Mikesell died at his home in Eugene, Oregon, aged 93, from natural causes.

== Selected publications ==
- "The Key Currency Proposal," Quarterly Journal of Economics 59.4:563-576 (August 1945)
- "Negotiating at Bretton Woods, 1944," in R. Dennett and J.E. Johnson, edd., Negotiating With the Russians (Boston: World Peace Foundation, 1951), pp. 101–16
- United States Economic Policy and International Relations. McGraw-Hill, 1952.
- The Economics of Foreign Aid, Chicago, 1968 (reprinted New Brunswick, N.J., 2007)
- The Bretton Woods Debates: A Memoir, Essays in International Finance 192 (Princeton: International Finance Section, Department of Economics, Princeton University, 1994)
- "A National Retail Sales Tax? Some Thoughts on Taxing Consumption the American way," State Tax Notes 11:105-09 (July 8, 1996); cf. "A National Sales Tax? Taxing Consumption the American Way," Tax Notes 72:523-27 (July 22, 1996)
- "Bretton Woods - Original Intentions and Current Problems," Contemporary Economic Policy 18.4:404-14 (October 2000)
- "The Meltzer Commission Report on International Institutions," Economic Development and Cultural Change 49.4:[883]-94 (July 2001)

== Sources ==
- Nolan, Rebecca. (2006, September 14). UO professor, Bretton Woods economist, dies at age 93. The Register-Guard, Eugene
- Staff and Wire Reports. (2006, September 17). Raymond Mikesell, 93; Economist Helped in Postwar Rebuilding. The Los Angeles Times
- University of Oregon, Department of Economics Annual Newsletter, Fall 2006
- Biography in R. Dennett and J.E. Johnson, edd., Negotiating With the Russians (Boston: World Peace Foundation, 1951), p. 100.
