= The Book of Aspirations =

The Book of Aspirations was part of a public participation effort by the 10th session of United Nations Conference on Trade and Development (UNCTAD X) in 2000.

The concept was suggested by Rubens Ricupero, Secretary General of UNCTAD to give people from all walks of life a voice in the solution of global problems.

== The document ==
The resulting document was structured in nine chapters and had, among others, contributions by Rebekah Jorgensen, Ph.D. (film producer), Bernice Dubois (French Coordination for European Women's Lobby), Shabbir A. Khan (President, Rashid Memorial Welfare Organization), Richard L Brolin (Director of World Economic Processing Zones Association), James Goldstein (Senior Research Director, Tellus Institute, Massachusetts), Roberta Beach Jacobson, Ph.D. (journalist), Felix.A.Ryan (environmentalist, Ryan Foundation), Lars Straeter (Chairman of Democratic World and SOLID), Tatoul Manasserian, Ph.D., D.S. (Professor of International Business and Economics, Yerevan State University, Armenia).

== Sources ==
UNCTAD X, The Book of Aspirations, Fall 2000

ESCAP Virtual Conference
