= Sheet-Glass Works Convention, 1934 (shelved) =

International Labour Organization Convention

C43
- ILO Convention
- Date of adoption: June 21, 1934
- Date in force: January 13, 1938
- This Convention has been "shelved".
- Classification: Hours of Work
- Subject: Working Time
- Previous: Workmen's Compensation (Occupational Diseases) Convention (Revised), 1934
- Next: Unemployment Provision Convention, 1934 (shelved)

Sheet-Glass Works Convention, 1934 (shelved) is an International Labour Organization Convention established in 1934, with a preamble stating:

Having decided upon the adoption of certain proposals with regard to the regulation of hours of work in automatic sheet-glass works...

== Ratifications ==
Prior to it being shelved, the convention was ratified by 13 states.
