= Social Policy (Basic Aims and Standards) Convention, 1962 =

International Labour Organization Convention

C117
- ILO Convention
- Date of adoption: June 22, 1962
- Date in force: April 23, 1964
- Classification: Economic and Social Policy
- Subject: Social Policy
- Previous: Final Articles Revision Convention, 1961
- Next: Equality of Treatment (Social Security) Convention, 1962

Social Policy (Basic Aims and Standards) Convention, 1962 is an International Labour Organization Convention.

It was established in 1962, with the preamble stating:

Having decided upon the adoption of certain proposals concerning the revision of the Social Policy (Non-Metropolitan Territories) Convention, 1947, which is the tenth item on the agenda of the Session, primarily with a view to making its continued application and ratification possible for independent States,...

== Ratifications ==
As of the end of 2015, the treaty has been ratified by 33 states.
