= Igor Korchilov =

Russian-English conference interpreter

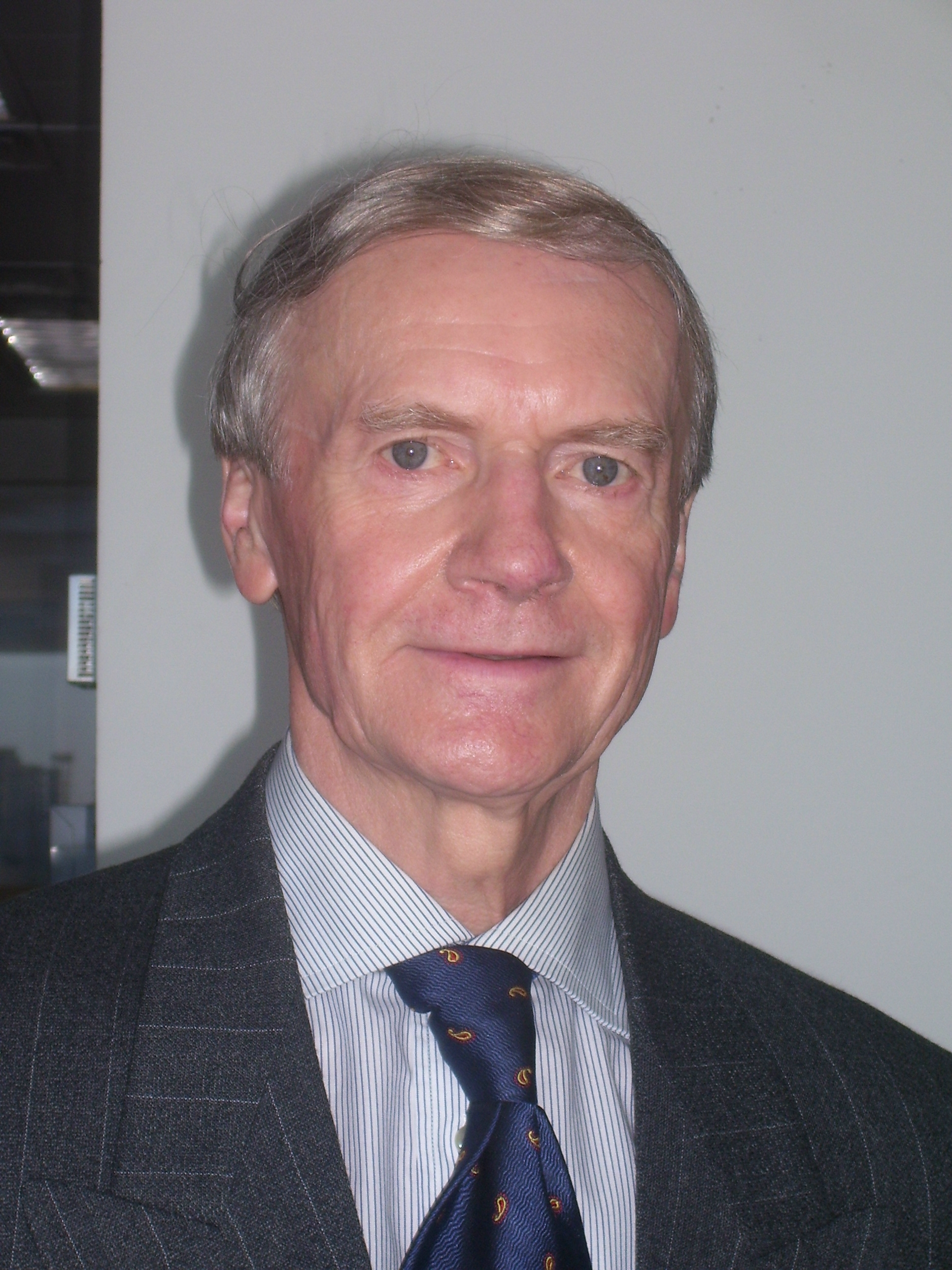
- Born: 1941 (age 84–85); Russia
- Occupation: Conference Interpreter (United Nations)

Igor Korchilov is a top-level Russian-English conference interpreter who worked with Soviet leader Mikhail Gorbachev from 1987 to 1990, a period that covered the Cold War era.

== Biography ==
=== Birth and childhood ===
Igor Korchilov was born in Murmansk, Russia. He grew up in the southern city of Kislovodsk, which is not far from Stavropol, where Mikhail Gorbachev was born.

=== Education ===
After finishing his secondary education, Korchilov worked as a film projectionist and as a disc jockey. It was during these two occupations that Korchilov heard of Elvis Presley's music, through a record that was brought back by a Georgia ballet company member from the United States. Because of Presley's music, he became interested in learning the English language and soon bought an English course book from a village bookshop to teach himself. He then prepared for and passed the entrance examinations for the Maurice Thorez Foreign Languages Institute, the best foreign-languages school in Moscow (now Moscow State Linguistic University). From 1961 to 1967, Korchilov attended the Maurice Thorez and earned a diploma majoring in English and Spanish.

From 1967 to 1968, Korchilov attended the United Nations Interpretation and Translation School in Moscow which earned him a certificate majoring in simultaneous interpretation. Later in the spring of 1968, Korchilov was sent to work as a junior conference interpreter at the United Nations headquarters in New York City. It was during this assignment that he interpreted during delicate summit meetings between the Heads of State and Government of the Soviet Union and the United States.

Then from 1985 to 1986, Igor Korchilov attended the school for Advanced Studies at the Russian Foreign Ministry's Diplomatic Academy in Moscow to earn a diploma on International Relations with a French language major.

=== As linguist and author ===
Korchilov was an interpreter for the Secretaries-General of the United Nations, and the Russian General-Secretary and other top officials of the Soviet Union for thirty years. He is the author of the book Translating History: The Top Russian Interpreter's Twenty-Five Years on the Front Line of Diplomacy (1997) published in the United States, Britain, Australia, Poland, China, the Czech Republic. Korchilov's book was also printed under the subtitles "30 Years On The Front Lines Of Diplomacy With A Top Russian Interpreter" and "The Summits That Ended The Cold War, As Witnessed by Gorbachev's Interpreter". Translating History is a recollection of Korchilov's time spent with Mikhail Gorbachev and many Western leaders, particularly Ronald Reagan, Margaret Thatcher, George H. W. Bush and his fellow Russian interpreter, Pavel Palazhchenko.

As one of the leading interpreters of his time, Igor Korchilov had the skill and ability to interpret simultaneously (simultaneous interpretation) and consecutively (consecutive interpretation). He can work both ways: that is from English into Russian, and also from Russian into English. He also interpreted from Spanish and French into Russian or English.

Korchilov had 22 years of work experience as a conference interpreter (from 1968 to 1973, from 1980 to 1985, and from 1990 to 2003) at the United Nations Headquarters in New York City:

  - For 13 years he was a diplomatic interpreter, translator and counselor for the Russian Foreign Ministry for the former USSR Ministry for Foreign Affairs in Moscow (from 1975 t0 1980 and from 1986 to 1990). From 1973 to 1975, Korchilov functioned as an interpreter and translator for the Council for Mutual Economic Assistance (CMEA) in Moscow, Russia.
  - Throughout his 13-year career with the Russian Foreign Ministry, Igor Korchilov worked at the top levels of the Russian government, primarily acting as personal interpreter to former Soviet general secretary Mikhail Gorbachev from 1986 to 1991. In his capacity as Gorbachev's interpreter, Korchilov participated in numerous summits in Washington, DC, in 1987; in Moscow in 1988; in London, The United Kingdom in 1989; in Bonn, Germany in 1989; in Ottawa, Canada in 1990; and again in Washington, D.C. in 1990. He also acted as a personal interpreter to two former Russian Foreign Ministers, namely Gromyko and Eduard Shevardnadze during numerous ministerial-level meetings and conferences held in Moscow, New York, Washington, D.C. and London.
  - During his 22-year career at the United Nations Headquarters in New York (1968 to 2003), Korchilov worked as a simultaneous interpreter for the UN Security Council's special summit meetings in 1992, 2000, 2001 and for the sensitive meetings on Iraq in 2003; and also for the United Nations General Assembly's plenary meetings, for various UN committees, and for other conferences and multilateral summits held under United Nations auspices. He also functioned as a personal interpreter to several U.N. Secretaries-General such as U Thant (1968–1972), Kurt Waldheim (1972–1973 and 1980–81), Javier Pérez de Cuéllar (1982–1990), Boutros Boutros-Ghali (1992–1996) and Kofi Annan (1997–2006) in New York and Moscow.
  - As a professional interpreter and translator, Korchilov had been closely involved in U.S.-U.S.S.R. arms control talks on Strategic Arms Limitation Treaty (SALT-I), Strategic Arms Reduction Treaty (START-I), Comprehensive Nuclear Test Ban Treaty (CTBT), Inter-Mediate Range Nuclear Forces Treaty (INF treaty), and with other numerous talks and discussions in Geneva, Switzerland, Moscow, New York and Washington, D.C. from 1975 to 1980 and from 1987 to 1990.

Since 2003, four years after officially retiring from the United Nations and up to the present, Igor Korchilov, continued working as a freelance interpreter. As a freelancer, some of his engagements included the following:

  - 11th Annual International Judicial Conference in Washington (May 2003)
  - 6th Annual Conference of the NATO's Partnership for Peace Consortium of Defense Academies and Security Research Institutes in Berlin (June 2003)
  - 4th Annual CIS Business Summit in London (June 2003)
  - U.N. Security Council meetings in New York (2003, 2004, 2005 and 2006)
  - U.N. General Assembly sessions in New York (2003, 2004, 2005 and 2006)
  - other U.N. meetings (2003, 2004, 2005 and 2006)
  - U.S.-Russian joint military exercise near Frankfurt (October 2003)
  - Sachs-Bloomberg conference on "Investing in Russia and the CIS" in New York (March 2004)
  - IPO roadshow presentations by Russian business companies in New York (2004, 2005, 2006 and 2007)
  - Council for Europe in Mexico City (January 2005)
  - Interparliamentary Union's World Conference of Speakers of Parliament in New York (September 2005)
  - World Bank's meetings on FLEG process in New York (May and December 2005)
  - XVI International AIDS Conference in Toronto, Canada (August 2006)
  - Russian Finance Investment Forum on Securitization in New York (September 2006)
  - G-8 Foreign Ministers Meeting in New York (September 2006)
  - 3rd Annual Women's Awards Ceremony, hosted by former Soviet general secretary Mikhail Gorbachev, in New York (October 2006)
  - A private ceremony honoring former Soviet leader Mikhail Gorbachev in New York (October 2006)
  - Business meetings between Stanley Morgan's C.E.O. J. Mack and Russian tycoon S. Kerimov in New York (November 2006)
  - 12th International Anti-Corruption Conference in Guatemala City (November 2006)
  - Majors Events of UNICRI-sponsored International Conference on Security in New York (December 2006)
  - Russia's SITRONICS/SISTEMA IPO Roadshow Presentations in New York (January 2007)

Because of his profile as an author and a veteran interpreter, Korchilov had been interviewed on radio and television. He had also given lectures in many U.S. universities regarding the subjects of interpretation and the Cold War era. The British Broadcasting Corporation (BBC) had shown interest in making a film based on his book.

=== Commendations ===
Korchilov received letters of commendation for interpreting at the US-UK-USSR Summit Meetings in 1987, 1988, 1989 and 1990; a citation on behalf of former Soviet general secretary Gorbachev for his excellent interpreting at a meeting with NATO Secretary-General M.Worner in 1990; and a citation for long and distinguished diplomatic interpreting service on behalf of former Russian Foreign Minister Shevardnadze. He also received numerous expressions of gratitude from other world leaders.

=== Interpreting credits ===
Korchilov's career as a professional polyglot enabled him to interpret for the following public figures and business personalities (among many others):

- Presidents: Ronald Reagan (U.S.), George H. W. Bush (U.S.), George W. Bush (U.S.), Bill Clinton (U.S.), Jimmy Carter, (U.S.), Richard Nixon (U.S.), Ferdinand Edralin Marcos (Philippines), Boris Yeltsin (Russian Federation), Mikhail Gorbachev (Russian Federation), Leonid Brezhnev (U.S.S.R.) and Nikita Khrushchev (U.S.S.R.)
- Vice Presidents: George H. W. Bush (U.S.) and Dan Quayle (U.S.)
- Queens: Elizabeth II (U.K.) and Noor (Jordan)
- Prime Ministers: Margaret Thatcher (UK), Tony Blair (UK), John Major (UK), Pierre Trudeau (Canada), Rajiv Gandhi (India) and Morarji Desai (India)
- Foreign Ministers: Andrey Gromyko (former Soviet Union), Eduard Shevardnadze (former Soviet Union) and Douglas Hurd (UK)
- United States Secretaries of State: Henry Kissinger, George P. Shultz, James Baker, Madeleine Albright, Colin Powell, Condoleezza Rice, Cyrus Vance and Gregory P. Howe
- Chancellors of Germany: Helmut Schmidt and Helmut Kohl
- United States Senators: Bob Dole, Ted Kennedy, Daniel Patrick Moynihan, John W. Warner and Sam Nunn
- NATO Secretaries-General: Manfred Worner (Germany), Javier Solana (Spain) and Lord Robertson of Port Ellen (UK)
- Business leaders: David Rockefeller (U.S.), A. J. Hammer (U.S.), Alexi Murdoch (Scotland), George Soros (U.S.), Bill Gates (U.S.), John J. Mack (U.S.) and Suleyman Kerimov (Russia)
- Astronauts and cosmonauts: John Glenn (U.S.), Jake Garn (U.S.), Yuri Gagarin (U.S.S.R.) and Valentina Tereshkova (U.S.S.R.)
- Princesses: Princess Anne (UK)
- Premiers: Alexei Kosygin (former Soviet Union) and Nikolai Ryzhkov (former Soviet Union)

== See also ==
- United Nations Interpretation Service
- Pavel Palazhchenko, UN Interpreter
