= Accommodation of Crews (Fishermen) Convention, 1966 =

International Labour Organization Convention

C126
- ILO Convention
- Date of adoption: June 21, 1966
- Date in force: November 6, 1968
- Classification: Fishermen
- Subject: Fishermen
- Previous: Fishermen's Competency Certificates Convention, 1966
- Next: Maximum Weight Convention, 1967

Accommodation of Crews (Fishermen) Convention, 1966 is an International Labour Organization Convention.

It was established in 1966, with the preamble stating:

Having decided upon the adoption of certain proposals with regard to accommodation on board fishing vessels, which is included in the sixth item on the agenda of the session,...

== Ratifications ==
As of 2022, the convention has been ratified by 23 states. Six ratifying states have denounced the treaty by automatic action.

Country	Date	Status
Azerbaijan	19 May 1992	In Force
Belgium	22 Jul 1969	In Force
Brazil	12 Apr 1994	In Force
Djibouti	03 Aug 1978	In Force
Germany	14 Aug 1974	In Force
Greece	19 Jun 1990	In Force
Kyrgyzstan	31 Mar 1992	In Force
Montenegro	03 Jun 2006	In Force
North Macedonia	17 Nov 1991	In Force
Panama	04 Jun 1971	In Force
Russian Federation	04 Nov 1969	In Force
Serbia	24 Nov 2000	In Force
Sierra Leone	06 Nov 1967	In Force
Slovenia	29 May 1992	In Force
Spain	08 Nov 1968	In Force
Tajikistan	26 Nov 1993	In Force
Ukraine	17 Jun 1970	In Force
