= Fishermen's Competency Certificates Convention, 1966 =

International Labour Organization Convention

C125
- ILO Convention
- Date of adoption: June 21, 1966
- Date in force: July 16, 1969
- Classification: Fishermen
- Subject: Fishermen
- Previous: Medical Examination of Young Persons (Underground Work) Convention, 1965
- Next: Accommodation of Crews (Fishermen) Convention, 1966

Fishermen's Competency Certificates Convention, 1966 is an International Labour Organization Convention.

It was established in 1966, with the preamble stating:

Having decided upon the adoption of certain proposals with regard to fishermen's certificates of competency,...

== Ratifications ==
As of 2022, the convention had been ratified by 10 states.

Belgium	22 Jul 1969	In Force
Brazil	21 Aug 1970	In Force
Djibouti	03 Aug 1978	In Force
France	02 Apr 1970	In Force
Germany	18 Nov 1988	In Force
Panama	19 Jun 1970	In Force
Senegal	15 Jul 1968	In Force
Sierra Leone	06 Nov 1967	In Force
Syrian Arab Republic	6 May 1969	In Force
Trinidad and Tobago	14 Dec 1972	In Force
