= Unemployment Provision Convention, 1934 (shelved) =

International Labour Organization Convention

C44
- ILO Convention
- Date of adoption: June 23, 1934
- Date in force: June 10, 1938
- This Convention has been "shelved".
- Subject: Social Security
- Previous: Sheet-Glass Works Convention, 1934 (shelved)
- Next: Underground Work (Women) Convention, 1935

Unemployment Provision Convention, 1934 (shelved) is an International Labour Organization Convention.

It was established in 1934, with the preamble stating:

Having decided upon the adoption of certain proposals with regard to unemployment insurance and various forms of relief for the unemployed,...

== Modification ==
The concepts included in the convention were modified and subsequently included in Employment Promotion and Protection against Unemployment Convention, 1988.

== Ratifications ==
Prior to it being shelved, the convention was ratified by 14 states.
