= Sunchubamba Game Reserve =

Protected area in Peru

- Coto de Caza Sunchubamba
- IUCN category VI (protected area with sustainable use of natural resources)
- Location within Peru
- Location: Peru; Cajamarca
- Coordinates: 7°31′43″S 78°29′06″W
- Area: 597.35 km^{2} (230.64 sq mi)
- Established: April 22, 1977
- Governing body: SERNANP
- Website: Coto de Caza Sunchubamba

Sunchubamba is a game reserve in the region of Cajamarca, Peru.

== History ==
The area of the reserve was formerly part of Casa Grande hacienda which was closed in the past century due to the low prices of sugar and the Peruvian agrarian reform. The present protected area was established in 1977.

== Geography ==
Sunchubamba Game Reserve is located in Cajamarca Province, in the region of Cajamarca. Its spans an area of 59,735 hectares (597.35 km^{2}).

== Ecology ==
=== Flora ===
Plant species from native forests in the area include: molle (Schinus molle), aliso (Alnus acuminata), Festuca dichoclada, Solanum sanchez-vegae, etc. There are also more than 500 hectares of plantations of introduced species like: Grevillea robusta, Pinus radiata and Cupressus spp.

=== Fauna ===
Animals considered game in this area are: the native white-tailed deer and the introduced red deer. Minor game are: the black-winged ground dove and the Andean tinamou.

The red deer was introduced for the first time in 1945 (3 individuals), but the locals killed them because they were afraid of how they looked like. In 1948, other 30 red deer were introduced and by 1972 there were around 200-360 deer in the reserve.

Animals protected in this area include: the tapeti, the Andean fox, the vizcacha, the variable hawk, the American kestrel, the aplomado falcon, etc.

== Activities ==
Trophy hunting is the main activity in the area. Scientific research has also been carried out in the area, even before its designation as a game reserve: a cloud seeding program was performed in the 1950s and 1960s at the then hacienda and surrounding areas as part of a program to fight drought in the region.
