= MUSHRA =

Listening test methodology

MUSHRA stands for Multiple Stimuli with Hidden Reference and Anchor and is a methodology for conducting a codec listening test to evaluate the perceived quality of the output from lossy audio compression algorithms. It is defined by ITU-R recommendation BS.1534-3. The MUSHRA methodology is recommended for assessing "intermediate audio quality". For very small or sensitive audio impairments, Recommendation ITU-R BS.1116-3 (ABC/HR) is recommended instead.

MUSHRA can be used to test audio codecs across a broad spectrum of use cases: music and film consumption, speech for e.g. podcasts and radio, online streaming (in which trade-offs between quality and efficiency of size and computation are paramount), modern digital telephony, and VOIP applications (which require quasi-real-time, low-bitrate encoding that remains intelligible). Professional, "audiophile", and "prosumer" uses are typically better suited to alternative tests, like the aforementioned ABC/HR, with a base assumption of high-quality, high-resolution audio wherein there will be minimal detectable differences between reference material and the codec output.

The main advantage over the mean opinion score (MOS) methodology (which serves a similar purpose) is that MUSHRA requires fewer participants to obtain statistically significant results. This is because all codecs are presented at the same time, to the same participants, such that a paired t-test or repeated measures analysis of variance can be used for statistical analysis. Furthermore, the 0–100 scale used by MUSHRA makes it possible to express perceptible differences with a high degree of granularity, especially compared to the 0-5 modified Likert scale often used by MOS experiments.

In MUSHRA, the listener is presented with the reference (labeled as such), a certain number of test samples, a hidden version of the reference, and one or more anchors (i.e. severely impaired encodings that both the experimenters and participants are supposed to immediately recognise as such; used similarly to the reference to provide a baseline demonstrating - "anchoring" - for participants the actuality of the low end of the quality scale). The recommendation specifies that a low-range and a mid-range anchor should be included in the test signals. These are typically a 7 kHz and a 3.5 kHz low-pass version of the reference. The purpose of the anchors is to calibrate the scale so that minor artifacts are not unduly penalized. This is particularly important when comparing or pooling results from different labs.

== Listener behavior ==
Both MUSHRA and ITU BS.1116 tests call for trained expert listeners who know what typical artifacts sound like and where they are likely to occur. Expert listeners also have a better internalization of the rating scale, which leads to more repeatable results than with untrained listeners. Thus, with trained listeners, fewer listeners are needed to achieve statistically significant results.

It is assumed that preferences are similar for expert listeners and naive listeners, and thus, the results from expert listeners are also predictive for consumers. In agreement with this assumption Schinkel-Bielefeld et al. found no differences in the rank order between expert listeners and untrained listeners when using test signals containing only timbre and no spatial artifacts. However, Rumsey et al. showed that for signals containing spatial artifacts, expert listeners weigh spatial artifacts slightly stronger than untrained listeners, who primarily focus on timbre artifacts.

In addition to this, it has been shown that expert listeners make more use of the option to listen to smaller sections of the signals under test repeatedly and perform more comparisons between the signals under test and the reference. In contrast to the naive listener who produces a preference rating, expert listeners therefore produce an audio quality rating, rating the differences between the signal under test and the uncompressed original, which is the actual goal of a MUSHRA test.

== Pre- or post-screening ==
The MUSHRA guidelines describe two major possibilities for assessing the reliability of a listener (described below).

The easiest and most common is to disqualify, post-hoc, all listeners who rate the hidden reference repeat below 90 MUSHRA points for more than 15% of all test items. The hidden reference should, in the ideal case, be rated at 100 points to indicate perceptual equivalence with the original reference audio. While it can happen that the hidden reference and a high-quality signal are confused, the specification provides that a rating of lower than 90 should only be given when the listener is certain that the rated signal is different from the original reference, so a rating below 90 for the hidden reference is considered a clear and obvious listener error.

The other possibility to assess a listener's performance is eGauge, a framework based on the analysis of variance (ANOVA). It computes agreement, repeatability, and discriminability, though only the latter two are recommended for pre- or post-screening. Agreement is the ANOVA of a listener's concurrence with the rest of the listeners. Repeatability examines the individual's internal reliability when rating the same test signal again in comparison to the variance of the other test signals. Discriminability analyses a sort of intertest reliability by checking that listeners can distinguish between test signals of different conditions. As eGauge requires listening to every test signal twice, its use is temporally inefficient in the immediate term relative to the prior method of post-screening listeners based on a hidden reference. eGauge does have advantages when used with a longer-term view. It negates the small chance of a complete redo in the rare case in which a sample's results lack sufficient statistical power due to an excessive failure rate discovered after the fact. Additionally, the initial inefficiency can be amortised over a series of experiments by removing the need for recruitment phases: if a listener has proven a reliable listener using eGauge, he or she can also be considered a reliable listener for future listening tests, provided the nature of the test is not substantially altered (e.g. a reliable listener for stereo tests is not necessarily equally good at perceiving artifacts in 5.1 or 22.2 configurations or potentially even mono formats).

== Test items ==
It is important to choose critical test items. Specifically, items that are difficult to encode and are likely to produce artifacts. At the same time, the test items should be ecologically valid: they should be representative of broadcast material and not mere synthetic signals designed to be difficult to encode at the expense of realism. A method to choose critical material is presented by Ekeroot et al. who propose a ranking-by-elimination procedure. While this is effective at selecting the most critical test items, it does not ensure inclusion of a variety of test items prone to different artifacts.

Ideally, a MUSHRA test item should maintain similar characteristics for its entire duration (e.g., the use of consistent instrumentation in music or the same person's voice with similar cadence and tone in spoken audio). It can be difficult for the listener to decide on a unidimensional MUSHRA rating if some parts of the items demonstrate different artifacts or stronger artifacting compared to other parts, which is rendered more likely by large variations in the characteristics of the audio. Often, shorter items lead to less variability as they demonstrate greater stationarity (perceptual consistency and constancy). However, even when trying to choose stationary items, ecologically valid stimuli (i.e. audio that is likely to appear or similar to that likely to appear in real-world situations such as on radio) will very often have sections that are slightly more critical than the rest of the signal (examples include keywords in a speech or major phrases of music and are dependent on the stimulus type). Stationarity is important as listeners who focus on different sections of the signal tend to evaluate it differently. Listeners who are more analytical seem to be better at identifying the most critical regions of a stimulus than those who are less analytical.

=== Language of test items ===
ITU-T P.800 tests, based on the mean opinion score methodology, are commonly used to evaluate speech codecs for use in e.g. VOIP. This standard specifies that the tested speech items should always be in the native language of the listeners. When MUSHRA is used instead for these purposes, language matching becomes unnecessary. MUSHRA experiments do not aim to test the intelligibility of spoken words but solely the quality of the audio containing those words and the presence or absence of audible artifacts (e.g. distortion). A MUSHRA study with Mandarin Chinese and German listeners found no significant difference between rating foreign and native language test items. Despite the lack of distinction in the end results, listeners did need more time and comparison opportunities (repetitions) to accurately evaluate the foreign language items. This compensation is impossible in ITU-T P.800 ACR tests wherein items are heard only once and no comparison to the reference audio is possible. In such tests, unlike MUSHRA tests, foreign language items are perceived and then rated as being of lower quality, irrespective of actual codec quality, when listeners' proficiency in the target language is low.
