= ITU Youth Forum =

Organization

The ITU Youth Forum is an initiative of the ITU-D Youth Program. ITU-D is one of three sectors of the International Telecommunication Union. The forums bring together students from all over the world to discuss Information technology and society-related topics.

The ITU Youth Forum is a recurring event arranged to be a part of either regional or global ITU Telecom events. Forum participants (youth fellows) are typically from the ITU member states comprising the region in which the event is organised. During the forum, youth fellows collaborate to produce joint declarations and/or action plans which are published by the ITU.
