= United Nations Commission on Population and Development =

- Abbreviation: CPD
- Formation: 3 October 1946; 79 years ago
- Type: Intergovernmental organization, Regulatory body, Advisory board
- Legal status: Active
- Headquarters: New York, US
- Head: Chair of the UN Commission on Population and Development; Ion Jinga
- Parent organization: United Nations Economic and Social Council
- Website: CPD at un.org

The Commission on Population and Development (CPD) is one of the ten Functional Commissions of the United Nations Economic and Social Council. At its establishment by ECOSOC in October 1946, the Commission's name was "Population Commission" and in December 1994, was changed to "Commission on Population and Development".

The goal of the Commission on Population and Development is the follow-up to the implementation of the Programme of Action of the International Conference on Population and Development. The Commission would monitor, review, and assess the implementation of the Programme of Action at the regional, national, and international levels and advise the Economic and Social Council on issues such as populations issues and trends, integrating population and development strategies, and on population and related development policies and programmes. It would also provide advice and assistance to the United Nations System, governments, and other organizations on population and development related efforts.

The Commission is composed of 47 Member States (for 2006) elected by the Economic and Social Council for a period of four years on the basis of geographic distribution. Representatives should have a relevant background in population and development. It met typically every two or three years until 1994, after which it has met once a year.

The United Nations Population Division is the main Secretariat unit assisting the Commission, compiles and analyzes data on populations aging.

== See also ==
- International Conference on Population and Development (ICPD)
- World population
