= List of International Labour Organization Conventions =

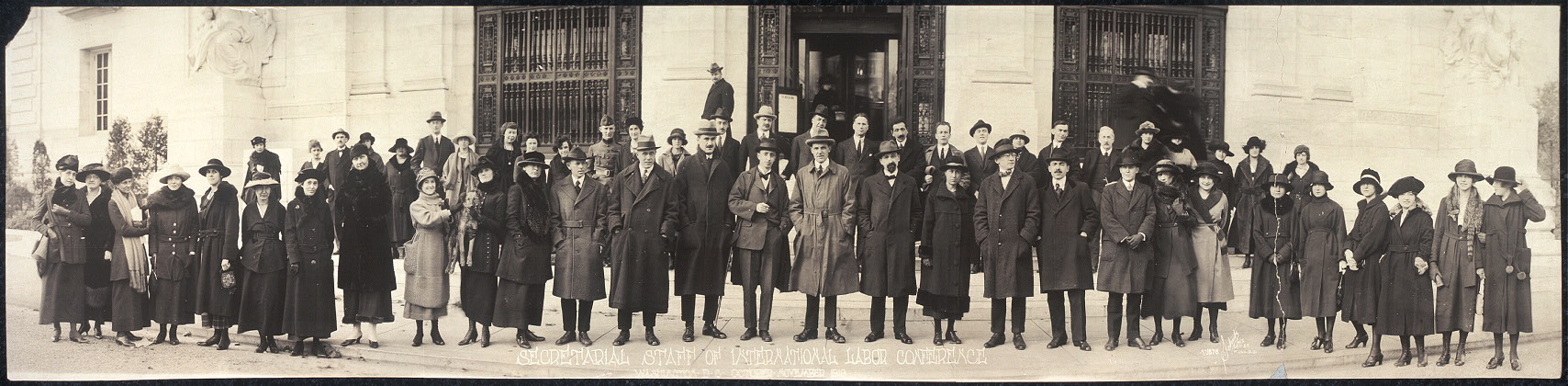
Established by the Versailles Peace Treaty in 1919, the ILO's primary task is to develop, adopt and promote labour standards

The list of International Labour Organization Conventions contains 193 codifications of worldwide labour standards. International Labour Organization (ILO) Conventions are developed through tripartite negotiations between member state representatives from trade unions, employers' organisations and governments, and adopted by the annual International Labour Conference (ILC). Member state governments subsequently ratify Conventions and incorporate their provisions into national legislation.

The first Convention was adopted in 1919 and covers hours of work, the most recent Convention, adopted in 2019, covers violence and harassment in the world of work. The Declaration on Fundamental Principles and Rights at Work, adopted by the member states in 1998, identified eight fundamental Conventions as binding on all members; four prohibit forced labour and child labour, and four provide rights to organize, to collectively bargain, to equal pay and to freedom from discrimination at work. There are also important Recommendations, which are widely adopted as standards, but do not have the same binding effect as Conventions, such as the Employment Relationship Recommendation, 2006 (No. 198) that ensures universal protection of workers for rights, and requires clear identification in national law for the employer, state or other party responsible for the right.

The ILO monitors the application of the Conventions and makes observations regarding member state compliance, however, there are no enforcement mechanisms within the ILO for non-compliance or breaches of the Conventions. The enforcement of Conventions depends on the jurisprudence of courts recognized by the respective member states.

== Classification of the Conventions ==
The ILO classifies Conventions by type, subject and status.

- Type relates to whether the convention is fundamental, covers governance matters or is technical (generally issues of working conditions).
- Subjects covered by the Conventions:
  1. Individual rights at work, mainly on safety, wage standards, working time, or social security, and the rights to freedom from forced to work or work during childhood.
  2. Collective labour rights to participation in the workplace, particularly to join a trade union, collectively bargain and take strike action, as well as direct representation within the management of organizations.
  3. Rights to equal treatment, that are referential to the terms and conditions of people in comparable situations, with special protections for indigenous communities and migrants.
  4. Promotion of job security, through standards for dismissals, protection upon an employer's insolvency, regulation of employment agencies and requirements upon member states to promote full and fulfilling employment.
  5. Requirements for administrative apparatus by governments to enforce and promote labour standards, through inspections, the collection of statistics, training and consulting with unions and employers before the passage of legislation.
  6. Sectoral Conventions specific to certain industries, these include seafaring, fishing, plantations, hotels, nursing, home and domestic work, where employees may be particularly vulnerable.
- Status relates to whether a Convention is up to date, requires revision or has been abrogated (withdrawn).

== List of the Conventions ==
Key: Convention (status)
Fundamental convention	Up to date	Partly up to date

Key: Subject
1. Labour rights	2. Workplace participation	3. Equality	4. Job security	5. Administration

Convention	Year	No.	Content	Ratif	Subject
Forced Labour Convention	1930	C029	Obligation for members to "completely suppress such forced or compulsory labour", with exceptions for military, civil service, court orders, for emergencies and minor communal orders.	181	1. Servitude
Freedom of Association and Protection of the Right to Organise Convention	1948	C087	The right to autonomy in union organisation, for furthering and defending workers' interests by collective bargaining and collective action.	158	2. Unions
Right to Organise and Collective Bargaining Convention	1949	C098	Protection against discrimination for joining a trade union, promotion of voluntary collective agreements, taking collective action.	168	2. Unions
Equal Remuneration Convention	1951	C100	The right to equal pay, without any discrimination on grounds of gender.	174	3. Equality
Abolition of Forced Labour Convention	1957	C105	Positive obligation on member states to ensure that all forced labour is abolished.	176	1. Servitude
Discrimination (Employment and Occupation) Convention	1958	C111	The right to not be discriminated against on grounds of "race, colour, sex, religion, political opinion, national extraction or social origin", or other grounds determined by member states, in employment.	175	3. Equality
Minimum Age Convention	1973	C138	The requirement that people are at least 15, or a higher age determined by member states, or 14 for member states whose education systems are developing, before working, and 18 years old before dangerous work.	176	1. Children
Occupational Safety and Health Convention	1981	C155	Also, Protocol of 2002 to the Occupational Safety and Health Convention, 1981, P155.	92	1. Safety
Worst Forms of Child Labour Convention	1999	C182	Duties upon member states to identify and take steps to prohibit the worst forms of child labour (slavery, prostitution, drug trafficking and other dangerous jobs).	187	1. Children
Promotional Framework for Occupational Safety and Health Convention	2006	C187		46	1. Safety
Protocol of 2014 to the Forced Labour Convention, 1930	2014	P029		61	1. Servitude
Weekly Rest (Industry) Convention	1921	C014		120	1. Working time
Medical Examination of Young Persons (Industry) Convention	1946	C077		43	1. Safety
Medical Examination of Young Persons (Non-Industrial Occupations) Convention	1946	C078		39	1. Safety
Labour Inspection Convention	1947	C081	Also, Protocol of 1995 to the Labour Inspection Convention, 1947 P081.	146	5. Administration
Labour Clauses (Public Contracts) Convention	1949	C094		62	1. Wages
Protection of Wages Convention	1949	C095		97	1. Wages
Migration for Employment Convention (Revised)	1949	C097		49	3. Migrant workers
Social Security (Minimum Standards) Convention	1952	C102		48	1. Social security
Weekly Rest (Commerce and Offices) Convention	1957	C106		63	1. Working time
Plantations Convention	1958	C110	Also, Protocol of 1982 to the Plantations Convention, 1958, P110.	12	Specific
Radiation Protection Convention	1960	C115		50	1. Safety
Equality of Treatment (Social Security) Convention	1962	C118		38	3. Equality
Hygiene (Commerce and Offices) Convention	1964	C120		51	1. Safety
Employment Injury Benefits Convention	1964	C121		24	1. Social security
Employment Policy Convention	1964	C122	Requirement to develop "co-ordinated economic and social policy" for the aim of full employment.	107	4. Unemployment
Medical Examination of Young Persons (Underground Work) Convention	1965	C124		41	1. Safety
Invalidity, Old-Age and Survivors' Benefits Convention	1967	C128		16	1. Social security
Labour Inspection (Agriculture) Convention	1969	C129		53	5. Administration
Medical Care and Sickness Benefits Convention	1969	C130		16	1. Safety
Minimum Wage Fixing Convention	1970	C131		51	1. Wages
Workers' Representatives Convention	1971	C135	Requires that worker representatives suffer no detriment or dismissal (art 1), they are given facilities to carry out tasks (art 2) including trade union and other elected representatives in an undertaking (art 3) and elected representatives' positions should in no way be used to undermine trade union representatives (art 5).	84	2. Representation
Benzene Convention	1971	C136		41	1. Safety
Occupational Cancer Convention	1974	C139		41	1. Safety
Paid Educational Leave Convention	1974	C140		34	1. Working time
Rural Workers' Organisations Convention	1975	C141		41	2. Unions
Human Resources Development Convention	1975	C142		68	5. Administration
Migrant Workers (Supplementary Provisions) Convention	1975	C143		23	3. Migrant workers
Tripartite Consultation (International Labour Standards) Convention	1976	C144		145	5. Administration
Continuity of Employment (Seafarers) Convention	1976	C145		17	Seafarers
Seafarers' Annual Leave with Pay Convention	1976	C146		17	Seafarers
Merchant Shipping (Minimum Standards) Convention	1976	C147	Also, Protocol of 1996 to the Merchant Shipping (Minimum Standards) Convention, 1976, P147.	56	Seafarers
Working Environment (Air Pollution, Noise and Vibration) Convention	1977	C148		46	1. Safety
Nursing Personnel Convention	1977	C149		41	Specific
Labour Administration Convention	1978	C150		76	5. Administration
Labour Relations (Public Service) Convention	1978	C151		53	2. Representation
Occupational Safety and Health (Dock Work) Convention	1979	C152		27	1. Safety
Hours of Work and Rest Periods (Road Transport) Convention	1979	C153		9	1. Working time
Collective Bargaining Convention	1981	C154		48	2. Unions
Workers with Family Responsibilities Convention	1981	C156		44	3. Equality
Maintenance of Social Security Rights Convention	1982	C157		4	1. Social security
Termination of Employment Convention	1982	C158	Requirement for employers to give a good reason before dismissing a worker. No conclusions on revision.	36	4. Fair dismissal
Vocational Rehabilitation and Employment (Disabled Persons) Convention	1983	C159		83	3. Equality
Labour Statistics Convention	1985	C160		50	5. Administration
Occupational Health Services Convention	1985	C161		33	1. Safety
Asbestos Convention	1986	C162		35	1. Safety
Seafarers' Welfare Convention	1987	C163		18	Seafarers
Health Protection and Medical Care (Seafarers) Convention	1987	C164		15	Seafarers
Social Security (Seafarers) Convention (Revised)	1987	C165		3	Seafarers
Repatriation of Seafarers Convention (Revised)	1987	C166		14	Seafarers
Safety and Health in Construction Convention	1988	C167		32	1. Safety
Employment Promotion and Protection against Unemployment Convention	1988	C168		8	4. Unemployment
Indigenous and Tribal Peoples Convention	1989	C169	The right of indigenous and tribal communities to participate in decision making procedures.	24	3. Indigenous
Chemicals Convention	1990	C170		21	1. Safety
Night Work Convention	1990	C171		17	1. Safety
Working Conditions (Hotels and Restaurants) Convention	1991	C172		16	Specific
Protection of Workers' Claims (Employer's Insolvency) Convention	1992	C173		21	4. Insolvency
Prevention of Major Industrial Accidents Convention	1993	C174		18	1. Safety
Part-Time Work Convention	1994	C175		17	3. Equality
Safety and Health in Mines Convention	1995	C176		33	1. Safety
Home Work Convention	1996	C177		10	Specific
Labour Inspection (Seafarers) Convention	1996	C178		15	Seafarers
Recruitment and Placement of Seafarers Convention	1996	C179		10	Seafarers
Seafarers' Hours of Work and the Manning of Ships Convention	1996	C180		21	Seafarers
Private Employment Agencies Convention	1997	C181		27	4. Agencies
Maternity Protection Convention	2000	C183		34	3. Equality
Safety and Health in Agriculture Convention	2001	C184		16	1. Safety
Seafarers' Identity Documents Convention (Revised)	2003	C185		35	Seafarers
Maritime Labour Convention	2006	MLC		90	Seafarers
Work in Fishing Convention	2007	C188		13	Specific
Domestic Workers Convention	2011	C189		27	Specific
Violence and Harassment Convention	2019	C190		6	Specific
Safe and Healthy Working Environment (Consequential Amendments) Convention	2023	C191		10	1. Safety
Biological Hazards in the Working Environment Convention	2025	C192		0	1. Safety
Decent Work in the Platform Economy Convention	2026	C193		0	Specific
Hours of Work (Industry) Convention	1919	C001		52	1. Working time
Unemployment Convention	1919	C002	Positive obligation on member states to establish and maintain public employment agencies.	57	4. Unemployment
Maternity Protection Convention	1919	C003		34	1. Child care
Right of Association (Agriculture) Convention	1921	C011		127	2. Unions
Workmen's Compensation (Agriculture) Convention	1921	C012		77	1. Wages
Equality of Treatment (Accident Compensation) Convention	1925	C019		121	3. Equality
Minimum Wage-Fixing Machinery Convention	1928	C026		104	1. Wages
Hours of Work (Commerce and Offices) Convention	1930	C030		30	1. Working time
Underground Work (Women) Convention	1935	C045		98	1. Safety
Forty-Hour Week Convention	1935	C047		15	1. Working time
Officers' Competency Certificates Convention	1936	C053		53	Seafarers
Minimum Age (Sea) Convention (Revised)	1936	C058		51	Seafarers
Right of Association (Non-Metropolitan Territories) Convention	1947	C084		9	2. Unions
Labour Inspectorates (Non-Metropolitan Territories) Convention	1947	C085		11	5. Administration
Employment Service Convention	1948	C088		91	4. Unemployment
Night Work (Women) Convention (Revised)	1948	C089		67	1. Working time
Accommodation of Crews Convention (Revised)	1949	C092		47	Seafarers
Fee-Charging Employment Agencies Convention (Revised)	1949	C096		42	4. Agencies
Minimum Wage Fixing Machinery (Agriculture) Convention	1951	C099		53	1. Wages
Social Policy (Basic Aims and Standards) Convention	1962	C117		32	1. Social security
Holidays with Pay Convention (Revised)	1970	C132		36	1. Working time
Accommodation of Crews (Supplementary Provisions) Convention	1970	C133		32	Seafarers
Dock Work Convention	1973	C137		25	Seafarers

== Recommendations ==
As well as Conventions, the ILO also produces Recommendations, which are widely adopted as standards. These do not necessarily have the same binding effect as Conventions, nor require a ratification and monitoring process, but are nevertheless widely followed. A key norm is the Employment Relationship Recommendation, 2006 (No. 198) that ensures universal protection of workers for rights, and requires clear identification in national law for the employer, state or other party responsible for the right.

== See also ==
- Declaration of Philadelphia 1944
- Declaration on Fundamental Principles and Rights at Work 1998
- International labour law
- European labour law
- UK labour law
- US labor law
