= Workmen's Compensation (Occupational Diseases) Convention (Revised), 1934 =

International Labour Organization Convention

C42
- ILO Convention
- Date of adoption: June 21, 1934
- Date in force: June 17, 1936
- Classification: Employment Injury Benefit
- Subject: Social Security
- Previous: Night Work (Women) Convention (Revised), 1934 (shelved)
- Next: Sheet-Glass Works Convention, 1934

Workmen's Compensation (Occupational Diseases) Convention (Revised), 1934 is an International Labour Organization Convention.

It was established in 1934:

Having decided upon the adoption of certain proposals with regard to the partial revision of the Convention concerning workmen's compensation for occupational diseases adopted by the Conference at its Seventh Session,...

== Modification ==
The convention revised Convention C18 and was subsequently revised in 1964 by Convention C121.

== Ratifications and denunciations ==
As of 2013, the convention has been ratified by 53 states. Subsequently, the convention has been automatically denounced by 13 states by reason of their acceptance of the revising convention.
