= Workmen's Compensation (Occupational Diseases) Convention, 1925 =

International Labour Organization Convention

C18
- ILO Convention
- Date of adoption: June 10, 1925
- Date in force: April 1, 1927
- Classification: Employment Injury Benefit
- Subject: Social Security
- Previous: Workmen's Compensation (Accidents) Convention, 1925
- Next: Equality of Treatment (Accident Compensation) Convention, 1925

Workmen's Compensation (Occupational Diseases) Convention, 1925 is an International Labour Organization Convention.

It was established in 1925:

Having decided upon the adoption of certain proposals with regard to workmen's compensation for occupational diseases,...

== Modification ==
This convention was subsequently revised in 1934 by Convention C42 - Workmen's Compensation (Occupational Diseases) Convention (Revised), 1934, and again in 1964 by Convention C121 - Employment Injury Benefits Convention, 1964.

== Ratifications ==
As of 2013, the convention had been ratified by 68 states. Of the ratifying states, eight had subsequently denounced the treaty.
