= C77 =

C77 may refer to:

- Ruy Lopez chess openings ECO code
- Honda C71, C76, C72, C77 Dream, motorcycle different models
- Secondary and unspecified malignant neoplasm of lymph nodes ICD-10 code
- London Underground C69 and C77 Stock trains
- Honda C77, a motorcycle
- Oil Fuel Hulk C77, other name of HMS Warrior (1860)
- Poplar Grove Airport FAA LID
- Medical Examination of Young Persons (Industry) Convention, 1946 code
- Caldwell 77 (Centaurus A), a galaxy in the constellation Centaurus

C-77 may refer to:

- C-77 (Michigan county highway)
- Cessna C-77, a four seats utility and cargo transport aircraft
