= Safety and Health in Mines Convention, 1995 =

International Labour Organization Convention

C176
- ILO Convention
- Date of adoption: 22 June 1995
- Date in force: 5 June 1998
- Classification: Industries and Occupations
- Subject: Occupational Safety and Health (OSH)
- Previous: Part-Time Work Convention, 1994
- Next: Home Work Convention, 1996

The Safety and Health in Mines Convention, 1995 is an International Labor Organization Convention adopted at the 82nd International Labor Conference (ILC). The convention (C176) was developed and adopted to better recognize the inherent hazards of the mining workplace and the necessity of addressing these hazards on a global scale.

The convention aims to safeguard and oversee miners' Occupational Safety and Health (OSH). By ratification, the governments and employers of the countries involved were to be responsible for safety. This agreement was officially adopted by the International Labor Organization on June 22, 1995.

As of June 2024, 35 nations have ratified this Convention.

== Needs for new international mining regulation ==
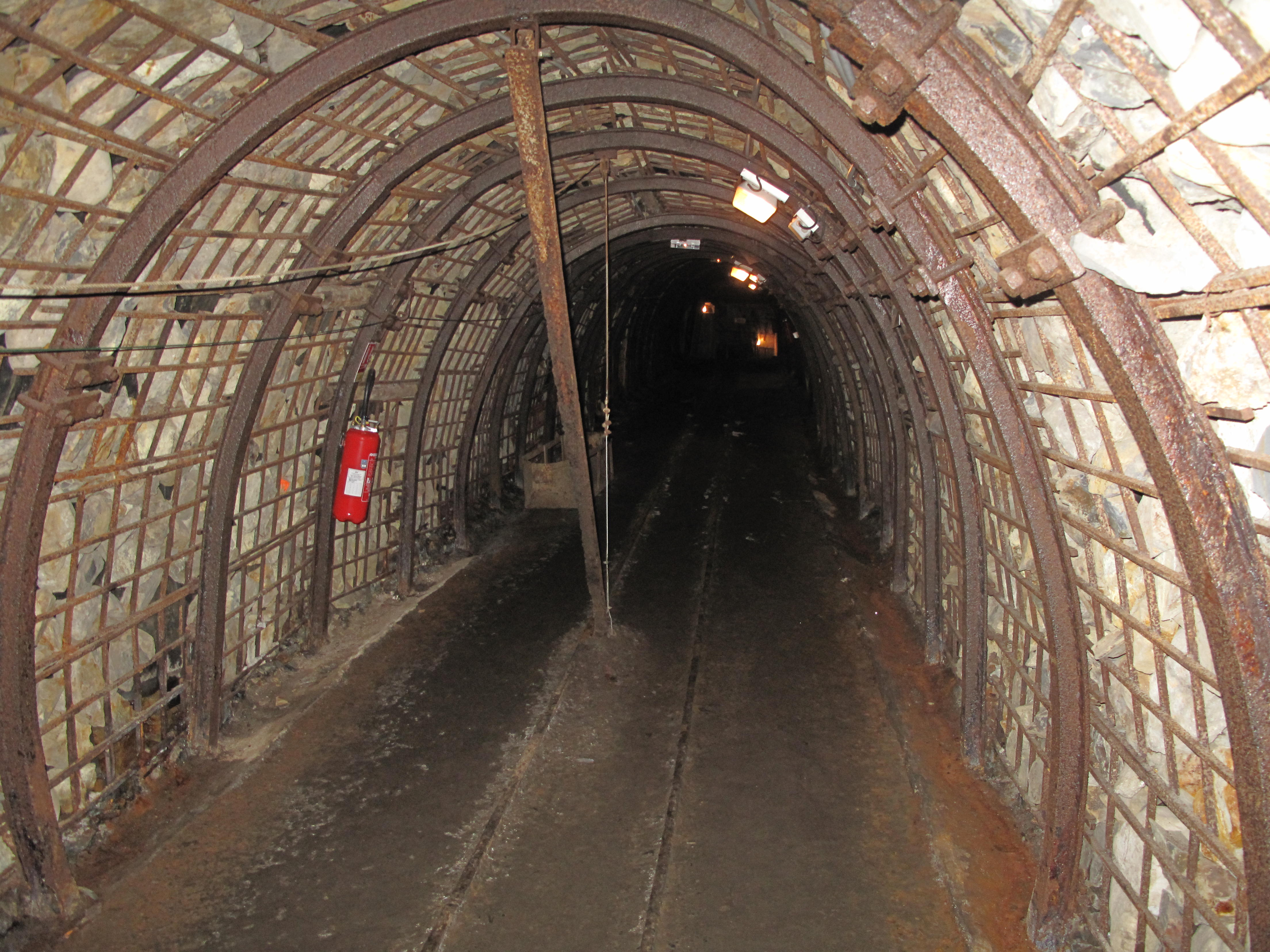
The entrance to a coal mine in Alès, France. A large risk for miners is the possibility of cave-ins. The convention outlines guidelines to reduce the risk of these disasters from occurring.

Due to the hazardous conditions that are present in mines, the governing body of the International Labor Organization (ILO) expressed the need for a convention regarding the health and safety of miners. The ILO wanted to prevent fatalities, injuries and environmental damage which resulted from unsafe mining.

=== Hazards in the mining industry ===
Mining safety is significant due to the numerous accidents that occur annually. The underground nature of the workplace often exposes workers to numerous hazards, such as harmful gases, falling debris, limited visibility, and uneven/dangerous terrain. Additionally, miners can become trapped during cave-ins, with the extraction and rescue process being both complicated and hazardous. Cave-ins pose a risk of secondary collapses since the necessary infrastructure to support the new topography would not be in place after an initial collapse, often trapping additional miners and rescue workers. When miners are trapped in rock pockets, the risks of explosions and oxygen deprivation are high.

As of 2001, over 30 million people were employed in the mining industry. Despite comprising only 1% of the world's workforce, mining accounted for over 8% of total workplace fatalities.

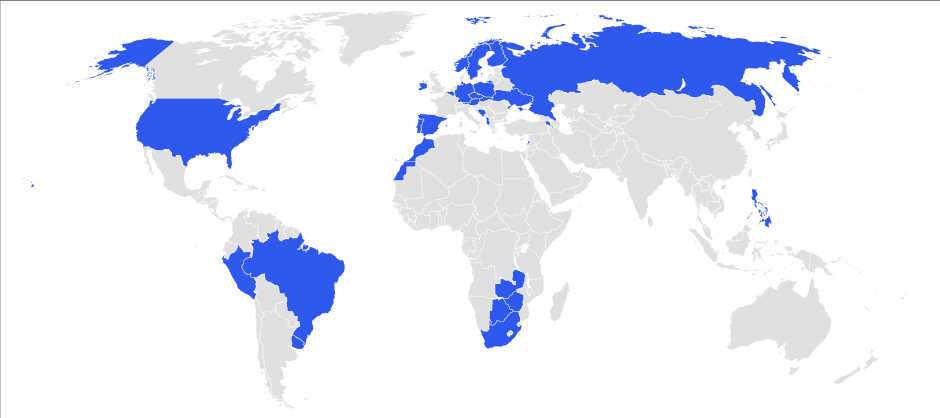
The 29 Current Ratifying Countries of the Safety and Health in Mines Convention

=== Relevant pre-existing conventions ===
Before the Safety and Health in Mines Convention, there were numerous other conventions that were relevant to health and safety in the mines, such as the Safety and Health in Construction Convention and Recommendation, the Prevention of Major Industrial Accidents Convention and Recommendation, and the Medical Examination of Young Persons' (Underground Work) Convention. These conventions, however, were insufficient in protecting the health and safety of miners, which made the development of a new, more thorough, and worker-focused convention necessary. Thus, the Safety and Health in Mines Convention was developed.

== Articles of the Convention ==
The document consists of 24 articles contained within 5 parts, preceded by a preamble.

- Preamble: The preamble recognizes the dangerous conditions in the world's mines and notes multiple conventions that contain relevant laws regarding miners' health and safety.
- Part 1: Definitions. One article states a clear definition for the terms "miner" and "employer."
- Part 2: Scope and Means of Application. Four articles lay out who upholds the Convention in ratifying countries.
- Part 3: Preventative and Protective Measures at the Mine. This part is divided into three sections, discussing the duties of employers and workers within the context of safety and health in mines.
  - Section A: Responsibilities of Employers. Seven articles state what employers must do to minimize hazards and what to do in the event of one.
  - Section B: Rights and Duties of Workers and Their Representatives. Two articles discuss workers' rights and their duty to comply with safety regulations.
  - Section C: Cooperation. One article states the responsibility that miners and their employers have to work together to achieve health and safety in mines.
- Part 4: Implementation. One article discusses the government's requirement to provide inspection services and institute penalties for non-complying mines.
- Part 5: Final Provisions. Eight articles describe the legality of ratifying the Convention and how to denounce it.

In Article 19 of Part 5, the process of denouncing the Convention is laid out. Countries are allowed to denounce the Convention only under certain circumstances. The article states that a country may denounce the Convention ten years after the Convention first came into force (in 1998). No countries have denounced the Convention yet.

== Ratification in the United States ==
The 42nd President of the United States, Bill Clinton, signed the Convention on January 5, 2001, with guidance from the Secretary of Labor, Alexis Herman. The United States was the 16th country to ratify the Convention.

=== United States mining regulation prior to the Convention ===
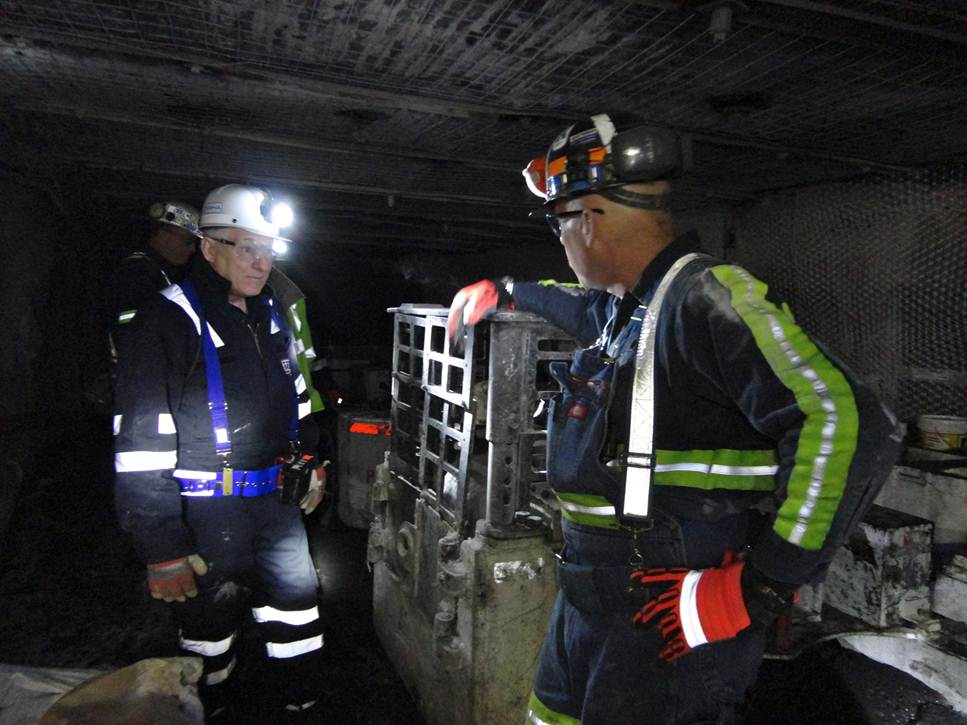
Mining personnel are shown demonstrating rescue equipment to MSHA inspectors. These inspections are required under both the U.S. Mine Act and the Convention.

Since the Convention contains laws enforceable by the government, the United States would be held accountable for all the laws within it. However, the United States already enforces many laws relevant to the Convention. The Department of Labor has a division applicable to miners. This division, the Mine Safety and Health Administration (MSHA), has been an agency with a mission to promote a safe and healthy workplace for miners by preventing injury and disease since 1977. The main method of doing this is by enforcing the Federal Mine Safety and Health Act of 1977, known as the Mine Act. The Mine Act sets various standards intended to reduce fatal accidents and minimize health hazards. Having the MSHA inspect every American mine accomplishes a part of the Mine Act. Additionally, the MSHA handles all accident reporting and safety issues from miners. The disease black lung, which largely affects miners, is being addressed by the MSHA in hopes of reducing its prevalence in the United States. Similarly, the laws outlined in the Convention aim to lower the number of individuals with diseases obtained from the mining workplace.

=== Overlap with the Mine Act ===
As a result of the already-implemented MSHA and the Mine Act in the United States, it was not clear whether or not the Convention ratification would have a large impact on the various mining health and safety laws. A tripartite panel consisting of representatives covering American government, labor and business was held. They compared the laws from the Convention and the laws set in place by the Mine Safety and Health Act of 1977. They concluded that the Convention could be signed by the president and ratified without the introduction of any new laws. This was due to the MSHA already enforcing all of the laws stated within the Convention.

=== Bill Clinton signing the Convention in 2001 ===
Even though the ratification would not introduce any new laws, Bill Clinton signed the Convention in 2001. It is believed that the United States has an interest in holding other countries accountable for miners' health and safety. By ratifying the Convention, the United States could reach out to other countries for failing to enforce the applicable laws, which would hold other nations accountable. In addition, the ratification helped make the United States mining industry more competitive in the global economy. (i.e., a coal buyer only interested in doing business with mines that had the Convention signed, whether on the basis of ethicality or legality, could lose business prior to the semantic ratification for American mines.)

== Ratification in Turkey ==
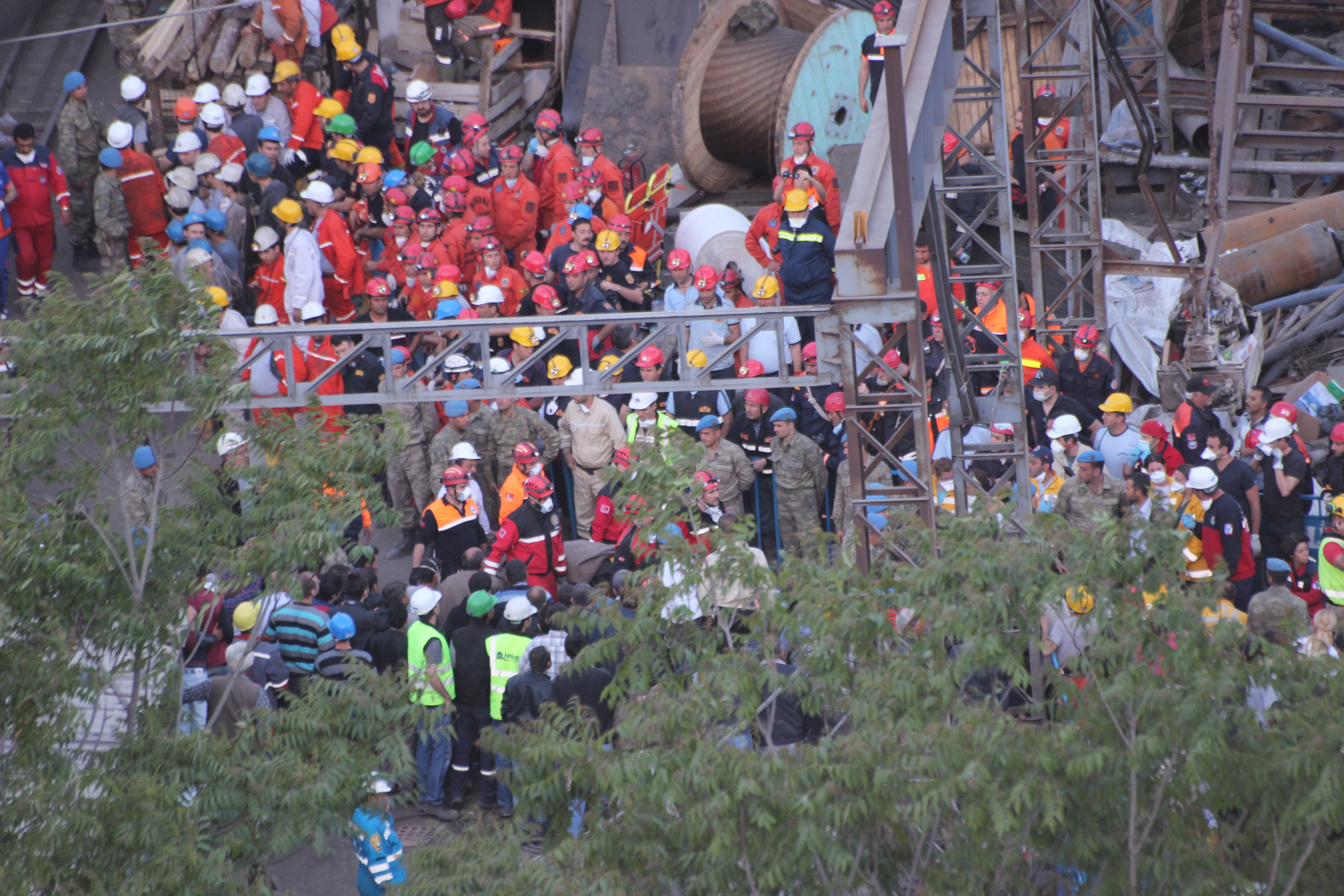
Rescue efforts after the Soma mining disaster

=== Soma mine disaster ===
At least 301 miners were killed in Soma, Turkey, after an explosion sent poisonous gasses throughout the mine. More than 100 workers survived the explosion and subsequent gas explosion but were killed as a result of the mine collapsing onto them. The backlash against the government and the mine's operator was strong, and the general manager and the operations manager were held on suspicion of neglect, which had caused numerous deaths. During the Soma disaster, a commission from the International Labor Organization was sent to discuss miners' health and safety with Turkish officials. The Turkish Labor minister, Faruk Çelik, claimed that strict laws were already in place in Turkey. In addition, Turkey claimed to be in full compliance with European Union standards and had laws even more advanced than the ILO Convention.

=== IndustriALL's push for ratification ===
IndustriALL, a global union that represents 50 million workers from 146 countries, urged Turkey to swiftly ratify the Convention following the Soma disaster. One of their goals as a global union is to make the world's mines safer. They claim that the best way to accomplish this is by having countries ratify the Convention and fully implement the laws and safety regulations contained within it. In addition, they state that the first priority of mining is to promote the safety and well-being of miners. They also state that favoring profit first should be considered intolerable criminal behavior.

=== Turkish Parliament approves the Convention ===
Following the Soma disaster, debates occurred in Turkey as to whether or not the government was protecting its miners from such disasters. Turkey was largely hesitant to begin ratification processes due to employer backlash over the cost of upholding the Convention's rules and regulations. In the end, the Turkish Grand National Assembly decided to formally adopt the Convention on December 4, 2014. Turkey's notice of ratification of the treaty was deposited on March 23, 2015.

However, this has not been a perfect resolution. Many employers are unable to cover the cost of the resulting changes, resulting in many mining companies reducing their workforce and closing down mines.

== Preventing Black Lung disease ==
Pneumoconiosis (also known as Black Lung or Miners' Lung) is an illness prevalent in the mining industry caused by prolonged exposure to mine dust, which can lead to respiratory failure and death. From 1968 to 2009, it was a contributor or underlying cause of death for over 73,800 worker deaths in the United States.. The United States Federal government has paid 45 billion dollars in compensation to miners and their dependents affected by the illness.

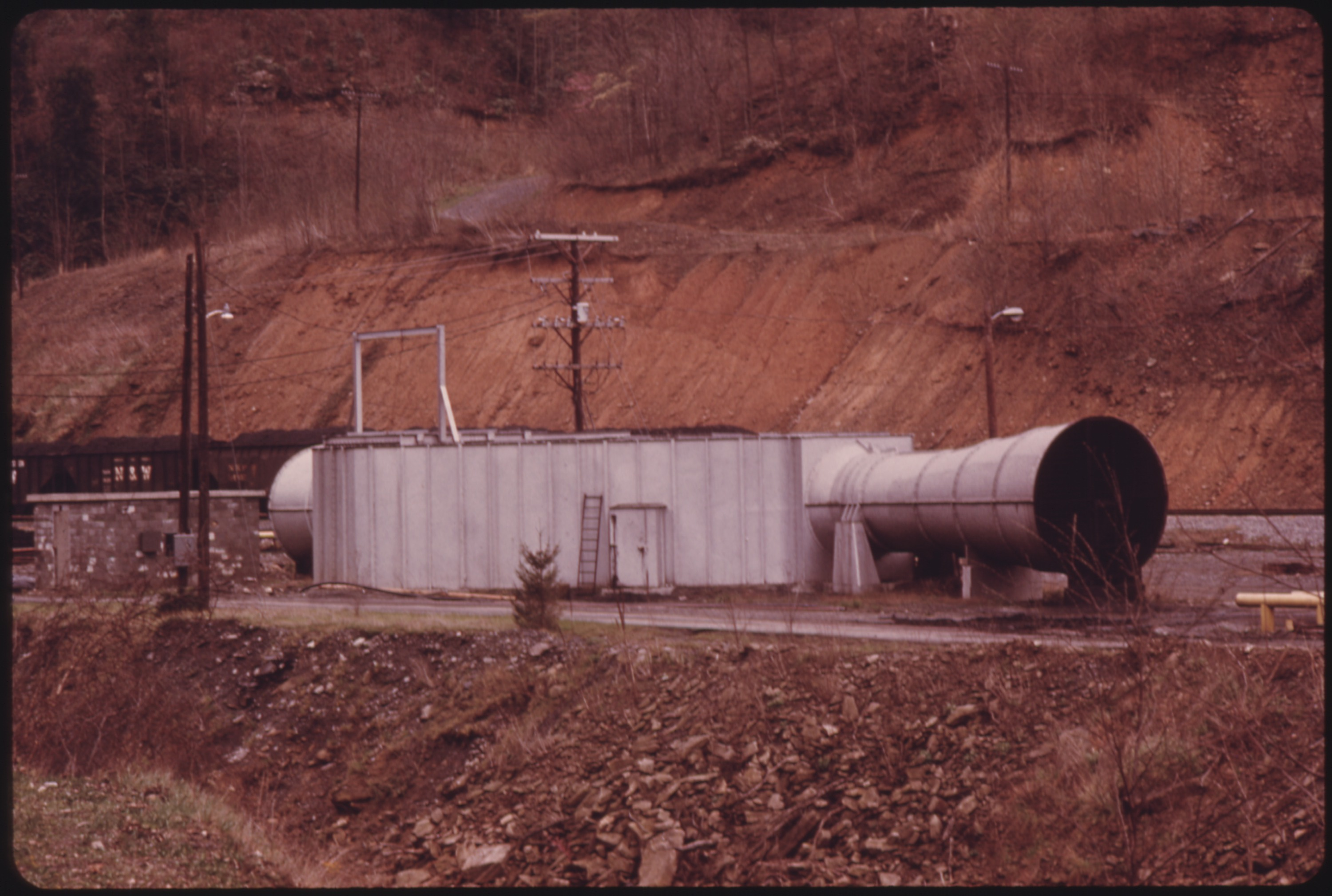
A large fan is shown blowing fresh air into a mine near Richlands, Virginia. Such equipment is required under the Convention and reduces the incidence of black lung in miners.

Despite this, with modern safety measures, pneumoconiosis is easily preventable, and a properly ventilated mine equipped with modern tools presents a significantly lower risk to the contraction of the disease. These measures, introduced following United States ratification of the Convention, have nearly eliminated Pneumoconiosis in the US. Whereas in China, where the Convention has not been ratified, pneumoconiosis remains prevalent: with 750,000 reported cases in 2013 and potentially many more unreported cases due to lax mining regulations

Article 7 of the Convention requires employers to take measures to minimize the risk of disease. This includes having good ventilation in all locations of the mine in which miners come in contact with. The Convention also requires that the working environment be monitored for hazards that can induce disease. Finally, Article 5 requires that countries publish statistics on occupational disease (including black lung).

== Issues with the Convention ==
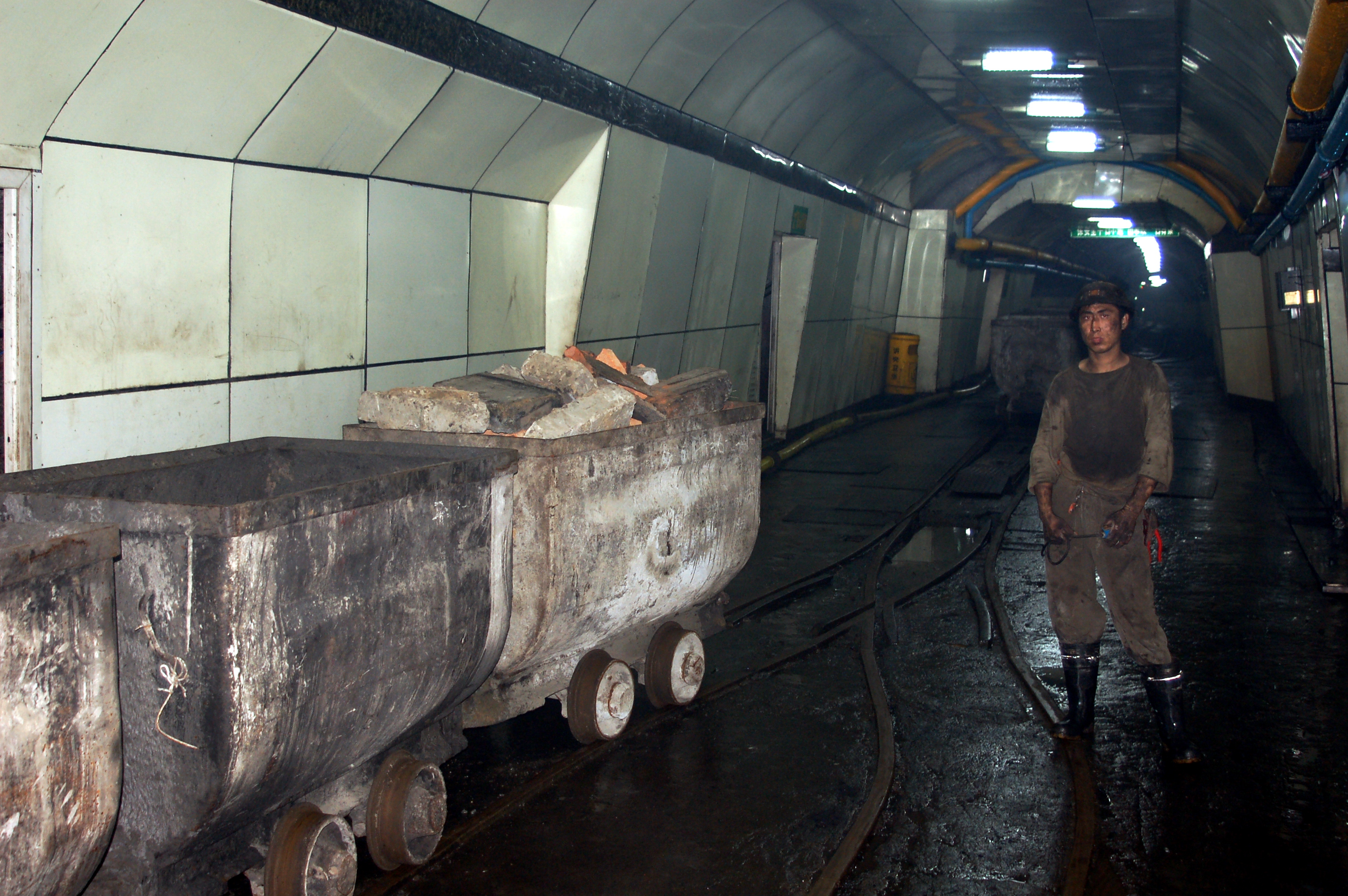
A coal miner working in Xingtai, China. China is the world's leader in coal production.

The goal of the Convention is to create a set of standards to promote the health and safety of miners, however, many prominent mining countries have yet to ratify the Convention. Furthermore, nations that have ratified the convention differ in the amount of effort put into the relevant agencies.

Of the five industrialized nations that dominate the mining industry, only two have ratified the Convention (the United States and Germany), and only a fraction of developing countries with large mining sectors have signed at the Convention. China, the world's leading coal producer, has yet to ratify the Convention.

Apart from the countries that have not ratified it, The effectiveness of the Convention relies on the diligence of the governments, and nations that have ratified the Convention are ultimately responsible for creating the relevant agencies and enforcing the standards laid out in the Convention.

=== European Union strengthening of the Convention ===
In 2008, the European Commission released a Recommendation for all EU members to ratify recent conventions from the ILO, including Convention 176. Similar to the United States, many EU member states have laws already in place that would match or, in some cases, surpass the laws laid out in the Convention. However, the Recommendations laid out by the Commission did not just ask for the ratification of the various conventions. The Commission recognized the notion that governments can ratify but not enforce the Convention. Therefore, it asked for convention rules to be strengthened and ensured that a supervisory system was in place to monitor the effectiveness of convention enforcement. The recommendation was released despite opposition from some EU nations claiming that the funding to the ILO should be lowered or, in some cases, dropped.

== Ukrainian project related to the Convention ==
The ILO project in Ukraine was implemented between May 1, 2017 and March 31, 2020. Its aim is to increase mine safety and the health of miners by introducing and enhancing modern occupational safety and health (OSH) policies. Given its policy implications, the project has increased social partners' awareness of the need to take steps to improve occupational safety, prevent work accidents, and fully implement health protection measures.

== Ratifications ==
As of November 2022, 34 countries have ratified the convention.

Country	Ratification date	Status
Albania	March 3, 2003	Ratified
Armenia	April 27, 1999	Ratified
Austria	May 26, 1999	Ratified
Belarus	February 13, 2020	Ratified
Belgium	October 2, 2012	Ratified
Bosnia and Herzegovina	January 18, 2010	Ratified
Botswana	June 5, 1997	Ratified
Brazil	May 18, 2006	Ratified
Chile	June 14, 2024	Ratified
Czech Republic	October 9, 2000	Ratified
Finland	June 9, 1997	Ratified
Germany	September 6, 1998	Ratified
Guinea	April 25, 2017	Ratified
Ireland	June 9, 1998	Ratified
Lebanon	February 23, 2000	Ratified
Luxembourg	April 8, 2008	Ratified
Mongolia	November 26, 2015	Ratified
Morocco	June 4, 2013	Ratified
Mozambique	June 14, 2018	Ratified
Norway	June 11, 1999	Ratified
Peru	June 19, 2008	Ratified
Philippines	February 27, 1998	Ratified
Poland	June 25, 2001	Ratified
Portugal	March 25, 2002	Ratified
Russia	July 19, 2013	Ratified
Slovakia	June 3, 1998	Ratified
South Africa	June 9, 2000	Ratified
Spain	May 22, 1997	Ratified
Sweden	June 9, 1997	Ratified
Turkey	March 23, 2015	Ratified
Ukraine	June 15, 2011	Ratified
United States	February 9, 2001	Ratified
Uruguay	June 5, 2014	Ratified
Zambia	January 4, 1999	Ratified
Zimbabwe	April 9, 2003	Ratified

== See also ==
- Mining accident
- Health and Safety Laboratory
