= Protection against Accidents (Dockers) Convention, 1929 (shelved) =

International Labour Organization Convention

C28
- ILO Convention
- Date of adoption: June 21, 1929
- Date in force: April 1, 1932
- This Convention has been "shelved".
- Classification: Dock Work
- Subject: Dockworkers
- Previous: Marking of Weight (Packages Transported by Vessels) Convention, 1929
- Next: Forced Labour Convention, 1930

Protection against Accidents (Dockers) Convention, 1929 (shelved) is an International Labour Organization Convention.

It was established in 1929:

Having decided upon the adoption of certain proposals with regard to the protection against accidents of workers employed in loading or unloading ships,...

== Modification ==
The concepts contained in the convention were revised and included in ILO Convention C32, Protection against Accidents (Dockers) Convention (Revised), 1932, and again in ILO Convention C152, Occupational Safety and Health (Dock Work) Convention, 1979.

== Ratifications ==
Prior to it being shelved, the convention had been ratified by four states.
