= C96 =

C96 may refer to:

- Mauser C96, a semiautomatic pistol
- Ruy Lopez chess openings ECO code
- Fee-Charging Employment Agencies Convention (Revised), 1949 code
- a class IIB wind turbine manufactured by Clipper Windpower
