= Employment Policy Convention, 1964 =

International Labour Organization Convention

C122
- ILO Convention
- Date of adoption: 9 July 1964
- Date in force: 15 July 1966
- Classification: Employment Policy
- Subject: Employment policy and Promotion
- Previous: Employment Injury Benefits Convention, 1964
- Next: Minimum Age (Underground Work) Convention, 1965

Employment Policy Convention, 1964 is an International Labour Organization convention.

It was established in 1964, with the preamble stating:

Considering that the Declaration of Philadelphia recognises the solemn obligation of the International Labour Organisation to further among the nations of the world programmes which will achieve full employment and the raising of standards of living, and that the Preamble to the Constitution of the International Labour Organisation provides for the prevention of unemployment and the provision of an adequate living wage,...

== Ratifications ==
As of May 2026, the convention has been ratified by 117 states.
