= Workmen's Compensation (Accidents) Convention, 1925 =

International Labour Organization Convention

C17
- ILO Convention
- Date of adoption: June 10, 1925
- Date in force: April 1, 1927
- Classification: Employment Injury Benefit
- Subject: Social Security
- Previous: Medical Examination of Young Persons (Sea) Convention, 1921
- Next: Workmen's Compensation (Occupational Diseases) Convention, 1925

The Workmen's Compensation (Accidents) Convention is the 17th convention of the International Labour Organization, adopted in 1925. It sets out the requirement that workers or their dependants must be compensated for injury as a result of accidents in the workplace.

== Modification ==
The Convention was subsequently revised in 1964 by Convention C121 - Employment Injury Benefits Convention, 1964.

== Ratifications ==
As of 2013, the convention has been ratified by 74 states. Three states—Chile, Sweden, and Uruguay—have subsequently denounced the convention.
