= Equality of Treatment (Accident Compensation) Convention, 1925 =

International Labour Organization Convention

C19
- ILO Convention
- Date of adoption: June 5, 1925
- Date in force: September 8, 1926
- Classification: Employment Injury Benefit
- Subject: Social Security
- Previous: Workmen's Compensation (Occupational Diseases) Convention, 1925
- Next: Night Work (Bakeries) Convention, 1925 (shelved)

Equality of Treatment (Accident Compensation) Convention, 1925 is an International Labour Organization Convention. The convention states that everyone in that country gets equal treatment in the case of industrial accident compensation, even if the one who is injured is not from the country with which the accident takes place. This convention was in part contributing to the ILO's efforts to "...admit the foreign workers (together with their families) employed within its territory, to the benefit of its laws and regulations for the protection of its own workers, as well as to the right of lawful organisation as enjoyed by its own workers" as stated in the Reciprocity of Treatment Recommendation, 1919.

It was established in June 1925, with the preamble stating:

Having decided upon the adoption of certain proposals with regard to the equality of treatment for national and foreign workers as regards workmen's compensation for accidents,...

When comparing the official convention and the draft convention as written in the conference report, not too much has actually changed between them. They split the first article into two paragraphs and did not touch the second article at all. The only major change between the draft and final version is that they shrunk the entirety of article three into article four and everything that is not included there from the original draft got left out of the final convention.

As with all conventions made before 1946, the formatting and titles in the articles were changed to match what was stated in the Final Articles Revision Convention, 1946.

== Ratifications ==
As of 2025, the convention has been ratified by 121 states, with the most recent being Montenegro in 2006. Though, some lists do not include Côte d'Ivoire when listing the countries that have ratified this convention.

== Applications ==
This convention has been cited in a case of migrant workers receiving equal treatment as their own citizens in Thailand. They determined that in order for everyone to receive equal treatment compensation, treatment, and social security benefits. They decided that for everyone to receive the same benefits, they would issue temporary working permits for all that are not yet legal migrants.
