= Leave of absence =

Authorised prolonged absence from work

The labour law concept of leave, specifically paid leave or, in some countries' long-form, a leave of absence, is an authorised prolonged absence from work, for any reason authorised by the workplace. When people "take leave" in this way, they are usually taking days off from their work that have been pre-approved by their employer in their contracts of employment. Labour laws normally mandate that these paid-leave days be compensated at either 100% of normal pay, or at a very high percentage of normal days' pay, such as 75% or 80%. A furlough is a type of leave.

There are many subcategories of paid leave, usually dependent on the reasons why the leave is being taken. Sick leave is normally compensated at 100% of pay, while other types of leave are often more restrictive, such as only compensating a certain percentage of normal pay, or as regards paid holidays, which in some countries are granted automatically by national governments, such as in most European Union countries, and in others, such as the United States, are a matter of employment contracts or labor union agreements, as well as state or local law.

The internationally acknowledged definition of paid leave, in international labour law as observed by the International Labour Organisation and others, is one that restricts itself only to pre-approved labour agreements in the workplace.

== India ==
In India, a Government service holder under the Union Government or any Provincial (State) Government can avail the following types of leave of absence during the service period:

- Earned leave: Leave of absence which is earned by the employee by dint of period of duty in service but usually credited in advance to the leave account in two installments per year at a rate 2.5 days per month (30 days per year) . The leaves, if not availed, get accumulated up to 300 days, but no more and also the employee remains entitled to a cash equivalent of the 80 days of such leaves not availed on the day of retirement from service.
- Half pay leave: All Government servants are entitled to 20 days of HPL for every completed year of service with all kinds of availed leaves included in the concerned year. These leaves get accumulated, if not availed without limit and credited in advance in two installments every year. They are the basis of calculation of commuted leave available to the employee after completion of one year of service.
- Commuted leave: Two half pay leaves due can be commuted to one fully paid commuted leave. Commuted leave not exceeding half the amount of half-pay leave due at any point of time can be taken on certified medical ground. Whereas 90 days of commuted leave can be availed during the entire service period without any certified medical ground.
- Leave not due: This leave of absence can be availed by an employee in the same manner as that of commuted leave but in advance under good faith on the part of the sanctioning authority that the employee shall clear the debt by accumulation of half pay leave through subsequent years of service till his retirement. Such leave is limited up to a maximum of 180 days at a stretch and 360 days in the entire service life.
- Parental leave (maternity leave, paternity leave)
- Study leave: Maximum three years available after completion of at least five years of service.
- Extra ordinary leave: Leave when no salary is to be given to the employee because he will be or was absent. This leave is granted to regularize unexplained absence resulting into discontinuation of service or can be opted by an employee when he needs a break and takes time off from duty.
- Casual leave: This leave is not strictly a leave because the employee is considered to be on duty and responsible.
- Child care leave
- Hospital leave
- Vacation department staff leave: Employees who work in departments where yearly seasonal vacation is admissible cannot earn leave. Other leaves are applicable.
- Special disability leave
- Child adoption leave
- Educational leave of absence: Leave of absence to continue schooling or complete a degree.

== Unpaid leave ==
Unpaid leave is leave that is granted exceptionally by the workplace and that is given permission to occur by the workplace, but is not compensated.

== See also ==
- Parental leave
- Garden leave
- Leisure
- Paid Educational Leave Convention, 1974
- Sabbatical
- Career break
