= Prevention of Accidents (Seafarers) Convention, 1970 =

International Labour Organization Convention

C134
- ILO Convention
- Date of adoption: October 30, 1970
- Date in force: February 17, 1973
- Classification: Safety, Health and Welfare
- Subject: Seafarers
- Previous: Accommodation of Crews (Supplementary Provisions) Convention, 1970
- Next: Workers' Representatives Convention, 1971

Prevention of Accidents (Seafarers) Convention, 1970 is an International Labour Organization Convention.

It was established in 1970:

Noting the terms of existing international labour Conventions and Recommendations applicable to work on board ship and in port and relevant to the prevention of occupational accidents to seafarers, and in particular of the Labour Inspection (Seamen) Recommendation, 1926, the Prevention of Industrial Accidents Recommendation, 1929, the Protection against Accidents (Dockers) Convention (Revised), 1932, the Medical Examination (Seafarers) Convention, 1946, and the Guarding of Machinery Convention and Recommendation, 1963, and

Noting the terms of the Safety of Life at Sea Convention, 1960, and the Regulations annexed to the International Load Line Convention, as revised in 1966, which provide for a number of safety measures on board ship which provide protection for persons employed thereon, and

Having decided upon the adoption of certain proposals with regard to accident prevention on board ship at sea and in port,...

== Ratifications ==
As of 2023, the convention had been ratified by 29 states. Of the ratifying states, 19 had subsequently denounced the treaty.

Country	Date	Status
Azerbaijan	19 May 1992	In Force
Belize	15 Jul 2005	Not in force
Brazil	25 Jul 1996	Not in force
Costa Rica	08 Jun 1979	In Force
Denmark	28 Jul 1980	Not in force
Egypt	04 Aug 1982	In Force
Finland	22 Nov 1974	Not in force
France	27 Feb 1978	Not in force
Germany	14 Aug 1974	Not in force
Greece	08 Jun 1977	Not in force
Guinea	26 May 1977	In Force
Israel	21 Aug 1980	In Force
Italy	23 Jun 1981	Not in force
Japan	03 Jul 1978	Not in force
Kenya	06 Jun 1990	Not in force
Kyrgyzstan	31 Mar 1992	In Force
Mexico	2 May 1974	In Force
New Zealand	31 May 1977	Not in force
Nigeria	12 Jun 1973	Not in force
Poland	26 Jun 1980	Not in force
Romania	28 Oct 1975	Not in force
Russian Federation	05 Oct 1987	Not in force
Spain	30 Nov 1971	Not in force
Sweden	17 Feb 1972	Not in force
Tajikistan	26 Nov 1993	In Force
Turkey	17 Mar 2005	In Force
United Republic of Tanzania	30 May 1983	Not in force
Uruguay	02 Jun 1977	In Force
