= Occupational Health Services Convention, 1985 =

International Labour Organization Convention

C161
- ILO Convention
- Date of adoption: June 25, 1985
- Date in force: February 17, 1988
- Classification: Occupational Health Services
- Subject: Occupational Safety and Health
- Previous: Labour Statistics Convention, 1985
- Next: Asbestos Convention, 1986

Occupational Health Services Convention, 1985 is an International Labour Organization Convention.

== Content ==
The convention was held on the 71st International Labour Convention session in Geneva on 25 June 1985. The preamble notes the relevance of the Protection of Workers' Health Recommendation, 1953, the Occupational Health Services Recommendation, 1959, the Workers' Representatives Convention, 1971, and the Occupational Safety and Health Convention and Recommendation, 1981, for the principles of this convention. Furthermore, it is emphasized that the employer has to protect the workers against sickness, disease and injury at the workplace.

=== Principles of national policy ===
The first four articles define the term occupational health services and workers’ representatives, how it has to be established and provided.

==== Article1 ====
The first article defines the term occupational health services as actions with preventive focus to protect all workers and employers. Workers’ representatives in the undertaking are people recognized as such under law or practice.

==== Article 2 ====
Each member of the convention shall organize and create their own national policy on occupational health services in cooperation with representative organizations of employers and workers and check on the implementation.

==== Article 3 ====
Every member has to develop ongoing occupational health services for all workers in all branches and arrangements must be adapted to the working conditions and risks. If occupational health services cannot be established immediately, each member has to plan such services in cooperation with the most representative organizations of employers and workers. Every member is required to provide information in reports on the implementation and progress of the plans submitted to the International Labour Organization.

==== Article 4 ====
The competent authority shall cooperate with the most representative organizations of employers and workers for implementation of the agreements.

=== Functions ===
The main functions and participations of occupational health services are resumed in the fifth article of the conventions. Occupational health services must detect and assess risks from health hazard at the workplace, check on possible risks to health in the working environment and all facilities provided by the employer, take part in planning and organization of work, workplaces and in maintenance of working equipment. In addition, occupational health services shall participate in the development of programmes, advice on occupational health, safety and hygiene, observe the health of workers in relation to work, support the improvement of working conditions, organize first aid and emergency treatment and analyze occupational accidents and diseases.

=== Organization ===
The articles six to eight determine the legal conditions for occupational health services. They also refer to competent authorities and the organization of services within and between companies.

==== Article 6 ====
The provision of occupational health services shall be made by law, collective agreements and contracts or another way approved by the competent authority.

==== Article 7 ====
Occupational health services can be organized for a single company or a number of companies. The services shall be organized by public authorities, social security institutions, authorized bodies or companies themselves.

==== Article 8 ====
Employers and workers shall cooperate and participate equally in the implementation of occupational health services.

=== Conditions of operation ===
Articles 9 to 15 describe the responsibilities of personnel and employers regarding occupational health services and the implementation of health protective measures.

==== Article 9 ====
Occupational health services shall cooperate with other services in the company and the personnel is determined by the nature of the tasks.

==== Article 10 ====
The personnel for occupational health services acts independent from employers and workers.

==== Article 11 ====
The competent authority determines the required qualifications for the personnel of occupational health services.

==== Article 12 ====
The surveillance of the workers’ health shall not involve earning loss, be free of charge and should take place in working time.

==== Article 13 ====
Every worker has to be informed about health hazards in their work.

==== Article 14 ====
Occupational health services are informed about known health hazards by employers and workers.

==== Article 15 ====
Occupational health services must be informed about occurring illnesses and workers’ absence for health reasons in order to identify possible health risks at work. The personnel must not be instructed by the employer to verify the reasons for absence from work.

=== General provisions ===
Articles 16 to 24 govern the ratification of this convention and the adoption of a new convention. They also contain the responsibilities of the Director-General of the ILO and the validity of the English and French versions.

==== Article 16 ====
National laws name the authorities responsible for the supervision of and advising on occupational health services.

==== Article 17 ====
The formal ratifications of the convention must be transmitted to the Director-General of the ILO.

==== Article 18 ====
The convention is binding for all members of the International Labour Organization, whose ratification is registered with the Director-General. It should enter into force twelve month after the registration with the Director-General.

==== Article 19 ====
A member can resign this convention after ten years from the date on which the convention first entered into force by writing to the Director-General of the ILO. One year after the act of resignation it comes into effect. Each member can resign within one year following the expiration of the ten years period. After that the convention can only be resigned after a next period of ten years.

==== Article 20 ====
The Director-General of the ILO shall notify all members transmitted to him or her by the members of the organization. When notifying the second ratification, the Director-General shall point out the date of entry into force of the convention.

==== Article 21 ====
The Director-General of the ILO shall provide the Secretary-General of the United Nations all registered ratifications and denunciations according to Article 102 of the Charter of the UN.

==== Article 22 ====
The Governing Body presents a report on the implementation of this convention to the General Conference as it may deem necessary. It also shall question its revision.

==== Article 23 ====
Adopts the conference a new convention, that revises this convention, the ratification of the new convention shall imply the immediate denunciation of this convention. With the entry into force of the new convention, this convention is no longer ratifiable. This convention remains in force in its present form for those members who ratified it but not the new convention.

==== Article 24 ====
The English and French versions of this convention are equally authoritative.

== Ratifications ==
As of April 2024, the convention has been ratified by 36 states.

Antigua and Barbuda	16 Sep 2002	In Force
Belgium	28 Feb 2011	In Force
Benin	10 Nov 1998	In Force
Bosnia and Herzegovina	02 Jun 1993	In Force
Brazil	18 May 1990	In Force
Burkina Faso	25 Aug 1997	In Force
Chile	30 Sep 1999	In Force
Croatia	08 Oct 1991	In Force
Czech Republic	01 Jan 1993	In Force
Finland	27 Apr 1987	In Force
Gabon	28 Jul 2015	In Force
Germany	17 Oct 1994	In Force
Guatemala	18 Apr 1989	In Force
Hungary	24 Feb 1988	In Force
Ivory Coast	01 Apr 2016	In Force
Luxembourg	08 Apr 2008	In Force
Madagascar	15 Jun 2023	Will enter into force on 15 Jun 2024
Mexico	17 Feb 1987	In Force
Moldova	25 May 2021	In Force
Montenegro	03 Jun 2006	In Force
Niger	19 Feb 2009	In Force
North Macedonia	17 Nov 1991	In Force
Poland	15 Sep 2004	In Force
San Marino	19 Apr 1988	In Force
Senegal	01 Mar 2021	In Force
Serbia	24 Nov 2000	In Force
Seychelles	28 Oct 2005	In Force
Slovakia	01 Jan 1993	In Force
Slovenia	29 May 1992	In Force
Sweden	01 Jul 1986	In Force
Turkey	22 Apr 2005	In Force
Ukraine	17 Jun 2010	In Force
Uruguay	05 Sep 1988	In Force
Zimbabwe	09 Apr 2003	In Force
