= Marking of Weight (Packages Transported by Vessels) Convention, 1929 =

International Labour Organization Convention

C27
- ILO Convention
- Date of adoption: June 21, 1929
- Date in force: March 9, 1932
- Classification: Dock Work
- Subject: Dockworkers
- Previous: Minimum Wage-Fixing Machinery Convention, 1928
- Next: Protection against Accidents (Dockers) Convention, 1929 (shelved)

Marking of Weight (Packages Transported by Vessels) Convention, 1929 is an International Labour Organization Convention.

It was established in 1929:

Having decided upon the adoption of certain proposals with regard to the marking of the weight on heavy packages transported by vessels,...

== Ratifications ==
As of 2013, the treaty has been ratified by 66 states.
