= Medical Examination of Young Persons (Non-Industrial Occupations) Convention, 1946 =

International Labour Organization Convention

C78
- ILO Convention
- Date of adoption: October 9, 1946
- Date in force: December 29, 1950
- Classification: Medical Examination
- Subject: Elimination of Child Labour and Protection of Children and Young Persons
- Previous: Medical Examination of Young Persons (Industry) Convention, 1946
- Next: Night Work of Young Persons (Non-Industrial Occupations) Convention, 1946

Medical Examination of Young Persons (Non-Industrial Occupations) Convention, 1946 is an International Labour Organization Convention.

It was established in 1946 with the preamble stating:

Having decided upon the adoption of certain proposals with regard to medical examination for fitness for employment in non-industrial occupations of children and young persons,...

== Ratifications ==
As of 2013, the convention has been ratified by 39 states.
