= Medical Examination of Young Persons (Sea) Convention, 1921 =

International Labour Organization Convention

C16
- ILO Convention
- Date of adoption: November 11, 1921
- Date in force: November 20, 1922
- Classification: Admission to Employment
- Subject: Seafarers
- Previous: Minimum Age (Trimmers and Stokers) Convention, 1921 (shelved)
- Next: Workmen's Compensation (Accidents) Convention, 1925

Medical Examination of Young Persons (Sea) Convention, 1921 is an International Labour Organization Convention.

It was established in 1921:

Having decided upon the adoption of certain proposals with regard to the compulsory medical examination of children and young persons employed at sea,...

== Ratifications ==
As of 2023, the convention has been ratified by 82 states. Of these, 56 states have subsequently denounced the treaty.
