= Protection of Workers' Claims (Employer's Insolvency) Convention, 1992 =

International Labour Organization Convention

Protection of Workers'
C173
- ILO Convention
- Date in force: June 8, 1995
- Classification: Protection of Wages
- Subject: Wages
- Previous: Working Conditions (Hotels and Restaurants) Convention, 1991
- Next: Prevention of Major Industrial Accidents Convention, 1993

Protection of Workers' Claims (Employer's Insolvency) Convention, 1992 is an International Labour Organization Convention.

It was established in 1992, with the preamble stating:

Stressing the importance of the protection of workers' claims in the event of the insolvency of their employer and recalling the provisions on this subject in Article 11 of the Protection of Wages Convention, 1949, and Article 11 of the Workmen's Compensation (Accidents) Convention, 1925,...

== Modification ==
The convention revised the principles contained in ILO Convention C95, Protection of Wages Convention, 1949.

== Ratifications ==
As of 2023, the convention has been ratified by 21 states.

Countries	Date	Status
Albania	03 Feb 2005	In Force
Armenia	18 May 2005	In Force
Australia	08 Jun 1994	In Force
Austria	20 Dec 1996	In Force
Botswana	05 Jun 1997	In Force
Bulgaria	28 Sep 2004	In Force
Burkina Faso	11 Feb 1999	In Force
Chad	15 Dec 2000	In Force
Finland	20 Jun 1994	In Force
Latvia	22 Feb 2002	In Force
Lithuania	26 Sep 1994	In Force
Madagascar	03 Jun 1998	In Force
Mexico	24 Sep 1993	In Force
Portugal	08 Nov 2012	In Force
Russian Federation	20 Aug 2012	In Force
Slovakia	24 Sep 1998	In Force
Slovenia	8 May 2001	In Force
Spain	16 May 1995	In Force
Switzerland	16 Jun 1995	In Force
Ukraine	01 Mar 2006	In Force
Zambia	25 May 1998	In Force
