= Minimum Wage-Fixing Machinery Convention, 1928 =

International Labour Organization Convention

C26
- ILO Convention
- Date of adoption: June 16, 1928
- Date in force: June 14, 1930
- Classification: Minimum wage
- Subject: Wages
- Previous: Sickness Insurance (Agriculture) Convention, 1927
- Next: Marking of Weight (Packages Transported by Vessels) Convention, 1929

Minimum Wage-Fixing Machinery Convention, 1928 is an International Labour Organization Convention.

It was established in 1928:

Having decided upon the adoption of certain proposals with regard to minimum wage-fixing machinery,...

The principles of the convention were modified and included in the Minimum Wage Fixing Machinery (Agriculture) Convention, 1951 and Minimum Wage Fixing Convention, 1970.

== Ratifications ==
As of 2015, 105 states have ratified the convention. One state, the United Kingdom, has ratified it but subsequently denounced it.
