= Protection against Accidents (Dockers) Convention (Revised), 1932 =

International Labour Organization Convention

C32
- ILO Convention
- Date of adoption: April 27, 1932
- Date in force: November 30, 1934
- Classification: Dock Work
- Subject: Dockworkers
- Previous: Hours of Work (Coal Mines) Convention, 1931
- Next: Minimum Age (Non-Industrial Employment) Convention, 1932

Protection against Accidents (Dockers) Convention (Revised), 1932 is an International Labour Organization Convention.

It was established in 1932:

Having decided upon the adoption of certain proposals with regard to the partial revision of the Convention concerning the protection against accidents of workers employed in loading or unloading ships adopted by the Conference at its Twelfth Session,...

== Modification ==
This convention is a partial revision of Convention C28 - Protection against Accidents (Dockers) Convention, 1929 (shelved). It was subsequently revised in 1979 by Convention C152 - Occupational Safety and Health (Dock Work) Convention, 1979.

== Ratifications ==
As of 2013, the convention has been ratified by 46 states. Of the ratifying states, 13 have denounced the treaty, many automatically due to the ratification of Convention C152.
