= Continuity of Employment (Seafarers) Convention, 1976 =

International Labour Organization Convention

C145
- ILO Convention
- Date of adoption: October 28, 1976
- Date in force: May 3, 1979
- Classification: Seafarers
- Subject: Seafarers
- Previous: Tripartite Consultation (International Labour Standards) Convention, 1976
- Next: Seafarers' Annual Leave with Pay Convention, 1976

Continuity of Employment (Seafarers) Convention, 1976, is an International Labour Organization Convention.

It was established in 1976 with the preamble stating:

Having noted the terms of Part IV (Regularity of Employment and Income) of the Employment of Seafarers (Technical Developments) Recommendation, 1970, and

Having decided upon the adoption of certain proposals with regard to continuity of employment of seafarers, ...

== Ratifications ==
As of 2023, the convention had been ratified by 17 states. Of the ratifying states, 13 have subsequently denounced the treaty.

Country	Date	Status
Brazil	18 May 1990	Not in force
Costa Rica	16 Jun 1981	Not in force
Egypt	17 Mar 1983	Not in force
Finland	02 Oct 1978	Not in force
France	3 May 1978	Not in force
Hungary	08 Jun 1978	Not in force
Iraq	14 Nov 1979	Not in force
Italy	23 Jun 1981	Not in force
Morocco	07 Mar 1980	Not in force
Netherlands	10 Jan 1979	Not in force
New Zealand	11 Jan 1980	Not in force
