= Employment Promotion and Protection against Unemployment Convention, 1988 =

International Labour Organization Convention

C168
- ILO Convention
- Date of adoption: June 21, 1988
- Date in force: October 17, 1991
- Classification: Employment Policy; Unemployment benefit
- Subject: Social security
- Previous: Safety and Health in Construction Convention, 1988
- Next: Indigenous and Tribal Peoples Convention, 1989

Employment Promotion and Protection against Unemployment Convention, 1988 is an International Labour Organization Convention to promote employment especially vocational guidance, training and rehabilitation, offer the best protection against the adverse effects of involuntary unemployment, but that involuntary unemployment nevertheless exists and that it is therefore important to ensure the social security systems should promote employment assistance and economic support to those who are involuntary unemployed. The convention calls for additional measures for disadvantaged categories of workers, such was women, migrant workers, or those affected by structural adjustment.

== Ratifications ==
As of February 2024, Albania, Belgium, Brazil, Finland, Norway, Romania, Sweden, and Switzerland had ratified the convention.
