= Working Environment (Air Pollution, Noise and Vibration) Convention, 1977 =

International Labour Organization Convention

C148
- ILO Convention
- Date of adoption: 20 June 1977
- Date in force: 11 July 1979
- Classification: Physical Hazards, Noise and Vibration
- Subject: Occupational Safety and Health
- Previous: Merchant Shipping (Minimum Standards) Convention, 1976
- Next: Nursing Personnel Convention, 1977

Working Environment (Air Pollution, Noise and Vibration) Convention, 1977 is an International Labour Organization Convention.

It was established in 1977, with the preamble stating:

Having decided upon the adoption of certain proposals with regard to working environment: atmospheric pollution, noise and vibration,...

== Ratifications ==
As of 2022, the convention had been ratified by 47 states.

Country	Date	Status
Azerbaijan	19 May 1992	In Force
Belgium	01 Jun 1994	In Force
Bosnia and Herzegovina	02 Jun 1993	In Force
Brazil	14 Jan 1982	In Force
Costa Rica	16 Jun 1981	In Force
Croatia	08 Oct 1991	In Force
Cuba	29 Dec 1980	In Force
Czech Republic	01 Jan 1993	In Force
Denmark	08 Jan 1988	In Force
Ecuador	11 Jul 1978	In Force
Egypt	4 May 1988	In Force
El Salvador	07 Jun 2022	In Force
Finland	08 Jun 1979	In Force
France	30 Jul 1985	In Force
Germany	18 Nov 1993	In Force
Ghana	27 May 1986	In Force
Guatemala	22 Feb 1996	In Force
Guinea	08 Jun 1982	In Force
Hungary	04 Jan 1994	In Force
Iraq	17 Apr 1985	In Force
Italy	28 Feb 1985	In Force
Kazakhstan	30 Jul 1996	In Force
Kyrgyzstan	31 Mar 1992	In Force
Latvia	08 Mar 1993	In Force
Lebanon	04 Apr 2005	In Force
Luxembourg	08 Apr 2008	In Force
Malta	09 Jun 1988	In Force
Montenegro	03 Jun 2006	In Force
Netherlands	08 Jun 2017	In Force
Niger	28 Jan 1993	In Force
North Macedonia	17 Nov 1991	In Force
Norway	13 Mar 1979	In Force
Poland	02 Dec 2004	In Force
Portugal	09 Jan 1981	In Force
Russian Federation	03 Jun 1988	In Force
San Marino	19 Apr 1988	In Force
Serbia	24 Nov 2000	In Force
Seychelles	23 Nov 1999	In Force
Slovakia	01 Jan 1993	In Force
Slovenia	29 May 1992	In Force
Spain	17 Dec 1980	In Force
Sweden	10 Jul 1978	In Force
Tajikistan	26 Nov 1993	In Force
Tanzania	30 May 1983	In Force
United Kingdom	08 Mar 1979	In Force
Uruguay	05 Sep 1988	In Force
Uzbekistan	12 Jun 2023	Will enter into force on 12 Jun 2024
Zambia	19 Aug 1980	In Force
