= Working Conditions (Hotels and Restaurants) Convention, 1991 =

International Labour Organization Convention

Convention concerning Working Conditions in Hotels, Restaurants and similar Establishments
- Parties to the convention
- Signed: 25 June 1991 (33 years ago)
- Location: Geneva, Switzerland
- Effective: 7 July 1994
- Condition: Two ratifications
- Ratifiers: Sixteen
- Depositary: Director-General of the International Labour Office
- Languages: French and English

The Working Conditions (Hotels and Restaurants) Convention, 1991, officially the Convention concerning Working Conditions in Hotels, Restaurants and similar Establishments is an International Labour Organization Convention adopted in 1991 during the 78 International Labour Conference.

It sets standards for work in hotels and restaurants. According to the convention, workers have a right to "reasonable normal hours of work" and "minimum daily and weekly rest periods", compensation (in time or remuneration) of work on holidays. Furthermore, a basic remuneration should be paid in regular intervals, regardless of tips.

== Ratifications ==
As of December 2022, 16 countries were party to the convention.

Country	Date	Status
Austria	2 May 1994	In Force
Barbados	22 Jun 1997	In Force
Belgium	14 Jun 2017	In Force
Cyprus	28 Feb 1997	In Force
Dominican Republic	04 Jun 1998	In Force
Fiji	28 May 2008	In Force
Germany	14 Nov 2006	In Force
Guyana	20 Aug 1996	In Force
Iraq	09 Jul 2001	In Force
Ireland	09 Jun 1998	In Force
Lebanon	23 Feb 2000	In Force
Luxembourg	06 Mar 2003	In Force
Mexico	07 Jun 1993	In Force
Spain	07 Jul 1993	In Force
Switzerland	15 Feb 1994	In Force
Uruguay	06 Sep 1995	In Force

== See also ==
- List of International Labour Organization Conventions
