= Paid Educational Leave Convention, 1974 =

International Labour Organization Convention

C140
- ILO Convention
- Date of adoption: 24 June 1974
- Date in force: 23 September 1976
- Classification: Paid leave
- Subject: Vocational education and Training
- Previous: Occupational Cancer Convention, 1974
- Next: Rural Workers' Organisations Convention, 1975

Paid Educational Leave Convention, 1974 is an International Labour Organization Convention.

It was established in 1974:

Considering that paid educational leave should be conceived in terms of a policy of continuing education and training to be implemented progressively and in an effective manner, and

Having decided upon the adoption of certain proposals with regard to paid educational leave, ...

== Ratifications ==
As of 2022, the treaty has been ratified by 35 states.

| Country | Date | Status |
|---|---|---|
| Afghanistan | 16 May 1979 | In Force |
| Azerbaijan | 11 March 1993 | In Force |
| Belgium | 12 January 1993 | In Force |
| Belize | 22 June 1999 | In Force |
| Bosnia and Herzegovina | 2 June 1993 | In Force |
| Brazil | 16 April 1992 | In Force |
| Chile | 13 September 1999 | In Force |
| Cuba | 30 December 1975 | In Force |
| Czech Republic | 1 January 1993 | In Force |
| Finland | 24 February 1992 | In Force |
| France | 20 October 1975 | In Force |
| Germany | 30 November 1976 | In Force |
| Guinea | 20 April 1976 | In Force |
| Guyana | 10 January 1983 | In Force |
| Hungary | 10 June 1975 | In Force |
| Iraq | 9 May 1978 | In Force |
| Kenya | 9 April 1979 | In Force |
| Mexico | 17 February 1977 | In Force |
| Montenegro | 3 June 2006 | In Force |
| Nicaragua | 1 October 1981 | In Force |
| North Macedonia | 17 November 1991 | In Force |
| Poland | 23 April 1979 | In Force |
| Russian Federation | 19 September 2014 | In Force |
| San Marino | 19 April 1988 | In Force |
| Serbia | 24 November 2000 | In Force |
| Slovakia | 1 January 1993 | In Force |
| Slovenia | 29 May 1992 | In Force |
| Spain | 18 September 1978 | In Force |
| Sweden | 23 September 1975 | In Force |
| Ukraine | 7 March 2003 | In Force |
| United Kingdom | 4 December 1975 | In Force |
| Tanzania | 30 May 1983 | In Force |
| Venezuela | 6 September 1983 | In Force |
| Zimbabwe | 27 August 1998 | In Force |
