= Rural Workers' Organisations Convention, 1975 =

International Labour Organization Convention

C141
- ILO Convention
- Date of adoption: June 23, 1975
- Date in force: November 24, 1977
- Classification: Collective Bargaining and Agreements; Freedom of Association
- Subject: Freedom of Association, Collective Bargaining, and Industrial Relations
- Previous: Paid Educational Leave Convention, 1974
- Next: Human Resources Development Convention, 1975

Rural Workers' Organisations Convention, 1975 is an International Labour Organization Convention.

It was established in 1975:

Having decided upon the adoption of certain proposals with regard to organisations of rural workers and their role in economic and social development, ...

== Ratifications ==
As of 2022, the convention has been ratified by 41 states.

Country	Date
Afghanistan	16 May 1979
Albania	18 August 2004
Austria	18 September 1978
Belgium	19 December 2003
Belize	22 June 1999
Brazil	27 September 1994
Burkina Faso	25 August 1997
Costa Rica	23 July 1991
Cuba	14 April 1977
Cyprus	28 June 1977
Denmark	6 June 1978
Ecuador	26 October 1977
El Salvador	15 June 1995
Finland	14 September 1977
France	10 September 1984
Germany	5 December 1978
Greece	17 October 1989
Guatemala	13 June 1989
Guyana	10 January 1983
Hungary	4 January 1994
India	18 August 1977
Israel	21 June 1979
Italy	18 October 1979
Kenya	9 April 1979
Mali	12 June 1995
Malta	9 June 1988
Mexico	28 June 1978
Republic of Moldova	4 April 2003
Netherlands	26 January 1977
Nicaragua	1 October 1981
North Macedonia	2 March 2018
Norway	24 November 1976
Philippines	18 June 1979
Poland	29 November 1991
Spain	28 April 1978
Sweden	19 July 1976
Switzerland	23 May 1977
United Kingdom	15 February 1977
Uruguay	19 June 1989
Bolivarian Republic of Venezuela	5 July 1983
Zambia	4 December 1978
