= Labour Administration Convention, 1978 =

International Labour Organization Convention

C150
- ILO Convention
- Date of adoption: June 26, 1978
- Date in force: October 11, 1980
- Classification: Labour Administration
- Subject: Labour Administration and Inspection
- Previous: Nursing Personnel Convention, 1977
- Next: Labour Relations (Public Service) Convention, 1978

Labour Administration Convention, 1978 is an International Labour Organization Convention.

It was established in 1978, with the preamble stating:

Having decided upon the adoption of certain proposals with regard to labour administration: role, functions and organisation, ...

== Ratifications ==
As of 2023, the convention has been ratified by 78 states.

| Country | Date | Status |
|---|---|---|
| Albania | 24 Jul 2002 | In Force |
| Algeria | 26 Jan 1984 | In Force |
| Antigua and Barbuda | 16 Sep 2002 | In Force |
| Argentina | 20 Feb 2004 | In Force |
| Armenia | 18 May 2005 | In Force |
| Australia | 10 Sep 1985 | In Force |
| Belarus | 15 Sep 1993 | In Force |
| Belgium | 21 Oct 2011 | In Force |
| Belize | 06 Mar 2000 | In Force |
| Benin | 11 Jun 2001 | In Force |
| Burkina Faso | 03 Apr 1980 | In Force |
| Cambodia | 23 Aug 1999 | In Force |
| Central African Republic | 05 Jun 2006 | In Force |
| China | 07 Mar 2002 | In Force |
| Congo | 24 Jun 1986 | In Force |
| Costa Rica | 25 Sep 1984 | In Force |
| Cuba | 29 Dec 1980 | In Force |
| Cyprus | 06 Jul 1981 | In Force |
| Czech Republic | 09 Oct 2000 | In Force |
| Democratic Republic of Congo | 03 Apr 1987 | In Force |
| Denmark | 05 Jun 1981 | In Force |
| Dominica | 26 Jul 2004 | In Force |
| Dominican Republic | 15 Jun 1999 | In Force |
| Egypt | 05 Dec 1991 | In Force |
| El Salvador | 02 Feb 2001 | In Force |
| Finland | 25 Feb 1980 | In Force |
| Gabon | 11 Oct 1979 | In Force |
| Germany | 26 Feb 1981 | In Force |
| Ghana | 27 May 1986 | In Force |
| Greece | 31 Jul 1985 | In Force |
| Guinea | 08 Jun 1982 | In Force |
| Guyana | 10 Jan 1983 | In Force |
| Iraq | 10 Jul 1980 | In Force |
| Israel | 07 Dec 1979 | In Force |
| Italy | 28 Feb 1985 | In Force |
| Ivory Coast | 01 Apr 2016 | In Force |
| Jamaica | 04 Jun 1984 | In Force |
| Jordan | 10 Jul 2003 | In Force |
| Kyrgyzstan | 22 Dec 2003 | In Force |
| Latvia | 08 Mar 1993 | In Force |
| Lebanon | 04 Apr 2005 | In Force |
| Lesotho | 14 Jun 2001 | In Force |
| Liberia | 02 Jun 2003 | In Force |
| Liberia | 02 Jun 2003 | In Force |
| Luxembourg | 21 Mar 2001 | In Force |
| Malawi | 19 Nov 1999 | In Force |
| Mali | 23 Jan 2008 | In Force |
| Mauritius | 05 Apr 2004 | In Force |
| Mexico | 10 Feb 1982 | In Force |
| Moldova | 10 Nov 2006 | In Force |
| Morocco | 03 Apr 2009 | In Force |
| Namibia | 28 Jun 1996 | In Force |
| Netherlands | 08 Aug 1980 | In Force |
| Niger | 29 Jun 2015 | In Force |
| North Macedonia | 22 Jul 2013 | In Force |
| Norway | 19 Mar 1980 | In Force |
| Portugal | 09 Jan 1981 | In Force |
| Romania | 04 Nov 2008 | In Force |
| Russian Federation | 02 Jul 1998 | In Force |
| Rwanda | 16 May 2019 | In Force |
| San Marino | 19 Apr 1988 | In Force |
| Serbia | 15 Mar 2013 | In Force |
| Seychelles | 23 Nov 1999 | In Force |
| Sierra Leone | 25 Aug 2021 | In Force |
| Spain | 03 Mar 1982 | In Force |
| South Korea | 08 Dec 1997 | In Force |
| Suriname | 29 Sep 1981 | In Force |
| Sweden | 11 Jun 1979 | In Force |
| Switzerland | 03 Mar 1981 | In Force |
| Togo | 30 Mar 2012 | In Force |
| Trinidad and Tobago | 17 Aug 2007 | In Force |
| Tunisia | 23 May 1988 | In Force |
| Ukraine | 10 Nov 2004 | In Force |
| United Kingdom | 19 Mar 1980 | In Force |
| United States of America | 03 Mar 1995 | In Force |
| Uruguay | 19 Jun 1989 | In Force |
| Venezuela | 17 Aug 1983 | In Force |
| Zambia | 19 Aug 1980 | In Force |
| Zimbabwe | 27 Aug 1998 | In Force |
