= Benzene Convention =

International Labour Organization Convention

Benzene Convention, 1971
C136
- ILO Convention
- Date of adoption: June 23, 1971
- Date in force: July 27, 1973
- Classification: Toxic Substances and Agents
- Subject: Occupational Safety and Health
- Previous: Workers' Representatives Convention, 1971
- Next: Dock Work Convention, 1973

The Benzene Convention (C136) is an International Labour Organization standard adopted in 1971 which seeks to regulate exposure to benzene processes and products at work.

Benzene is a classified carcinogen that significantly increases the risk of developing cancer and is a common cause for bone marrow failure. Recognized by the International Agency for Research on Cancer (IARC) as "known to be carcinogenic to humans" (Group 1)... Benzene is known to cause acute myeloid leukemia (AML) and acute nonlymphocytic leukemia (ANLL). In 1948 the American Petroleum Institute (API) stated that "the only absolutely safe concentration for. benzene is zero". Despite this warning benzene remains a natural component of gasoline and other widely used fuels, making human benzene exposure a constant global health concern. Beyond carcinogenic effects benzene damages vital organs including the liver, lungs, kidneys, heart and brain. Additionally benzene is also known to induce DNA strand breaks, chromosomal damage and exhibits mutagenic and teratogenic properties.

The 1971 benzene convention addressed workers exposure to benzene along with products that contains benzene. Within the 22 articles of this convention, each addressing issues with benzene exposure, highlights ways in which we can limit benzene exposure among workers.

Article 1 of the convention defines benzene as a hydrocarbon (C6H6) and includes products that contain benzene that could cause exposure.

Article 2 of the convention states that if a harmless or less harmful product substitute is available then they must be used instead of benzene. It's important to note this article does not pertain to the production or use of benzene.

Article 3 of the convention gives countries the right to change benzene regulation within the country and allows proposals for further action needed.

Article 4 of the convention prohibits the use of benzene and products in certain work spaces which are regulated by national law. This is not limited to work processes that require benzene, these processes are to be carried out in a controlled environment or equally safe environments.

Article 5 of the convention solidifies that proper measures and hygiene must be up-kept to ensure the protection of the worker.

Article 6 of the convention requires that wherever benzene is manufactured, handled, or utilized, all measures must be taken in order to prevent the escape of benzene vapor into a workplace. It also limits the maximum exposure to 25 parts per million. (80 mg/m3) This article also gives authority to the employer to ensure these concentrations stay within the limit.

Article 7 of the convention restricts work processes that involve benzene to be done in an enclosed environment unless unfeasible. In this case a space must effectively remove benzene vapor enough to ensure the protection of health of the workers.

Article 8 of the convention states that workers that may come into any contact with benzene will be provided with proper PPE against absorption or inhalation.

Article 9 of the convention requires all workers that can be exposed to benzene in a work environment must undergo a pre-employment screening including additional periodic screenings while working in the environment.

Article 10 of the convention adds to the previous article stating that all examinations must be done by a certified physician at no cost to the worker.

Article 11 of the convention prohibits pregnant women and nursing mothers along with individuals under the age of 18 (unless exposed under education or training purposes under adequate supervision) from exposure to benzene or benzene products while at work.

== Ratifications ==
As of March 2025, the convention has been ratified by 38 countries (Luxembourg being the last to ratify in 2008).

The United States is not listed as benzene exposure and limits are regulated by the Occupational Safety and Health Administration (OSHA) and the Environmental Protection Agency (EPA).

Country	Date Joined	Status	
France	June 30, 1972	In Force	1
Iraq	July 27,1972	In Force	2
Hungary	September 11, 1972	In Force	3
Cuba	November 17, 1972	In Force	4
Côte d'Ivoire	February 21, 1973	In Force	5
Spain	May 8, 1973	In Force	6
Zambia	May 24, 1973	In Force	7
Germany	September 26, 1973	In Force	8
Kuwait	March 29, 1974	In Force	9
Morocco	July 22, 1974	In Force	10
Switzerland	March 25, 1975	In Force	11
Ecuador	March 27, 1975	In Force	12
Romania	November 6, 1975	In Force	13
Finland	January 13, 1976	In Force	14
Colombia	November 16,1976	In Force	15
Greece	January 24, 1977	In Force	16
Bolivia	January 31, 1977	In Force	17
Syrian Arab Republic	February 7, 1977	In Force	18
Guinea	May 26, 1977	In Force	19
Uruguay	June 2, 1977	In Force	20
Israel	June 21, 1979	In Force	21
Italy	June 23, 1981	In Force	22
Nicaragua	Oct 1, 1981	In Force	23
Guyana	January 10, 1983	In Force	24
Malta	May 18, 1990	In Force	25
India	June 11, 1991	In Force	26
Croatia	October 8, 1991	In Force	27
North Macedonia	November 17, 1991	In Force	28
Slovenia	May 29, 1992	In Force	29
Slovakia	January 1, 1993	In Force	30
Czechia	January 1, 1993	In Force	31
Brazil	March 24, 1993	In Force	32
Bosnia and Herzegovina	June 2, 1993	In Force	33
Chile	October 14, 1994	In Force	34
Lebanon	February 23, 2000	In Force	35
Serbia	November 24, 2000	In Force	36
Montenegro	June 3, 2006	In Force	37
Luxembourg	April 8, 2008	In Force	38
