= Repatriation of Seafarers Convention (Revised), 1987 =

International Labour Organization Convention

C166
- ILO Convention
- Date of adoption: October 9, 1987
- Date in force: July 3, 1991
- Classification: Conditions of Work
- Subject: Seafarers
- Previous: Social Security (Seafarers) Convention (Revised), 1987
- Next: Safety and Health in Construction Convention, 1988

Repatriation of Seafarers Convention (Revised), 1987 is an International Labour Organization Convention (Number 166).

It was established in 1987, with the preamble stating:

Having decided upon the adoption of certain proposals with regard to the Revision of the Repatriation of Seamen Convention, 1926 (No. 23), and of the Repatriation (Ship Masters and Apprentices) Recommendation, 1926 (No. 27),,...

== Ratifications ==
As of 2023, the convention had been ratified by 14 states. Of the ratifying states, ten have subsequently denounced the treaty.

Country	Date	Status
Egypt	28 May 2004	In Force
Guyana	10 Jun 1996	In Force
Mexico	05 Oct 1990	In Force
Turkey	17 Mar 2005	In Force
