= Minimum Wage Fixing Convention 1970 =

International Labour Organization Convention

Minimum Wage Fixing Convention, 1970
C131
- ILO Convention
- Date of adoption: June 22, 1970
- Date in force: April 29, 1972
- Classification: Minimum wage
- Subject: Wages
- Previous: Medical Care and Sickness Benefits Convention, 1969
- Next: Holidays with Pay Convention (Revised), 1970

The Minimum Wage Fixing Convention is an International Labour Organization standard adopted in 1970. The Convention requires states to establish systems of minimum wages and to implement machinery for the fixing and revision of minimum wages. The Convention requires states to consult with employers and trade unions when fixing minimum wages.

== Ratifications ==
As of February 2024, the convention has been ratified by 54 states.
