= Protection of Wages Convention, 1949 =

International Labour Organization

C95
- ILO Convention
- Date of adoption: 1 July 1949
- Date in force: 24 September 1952
- Classification: Protection of Wages
- Subject: Wages
- Previous: Labour Clauses (Public Contracts) Convention, 1949
- Next: Fee-Charging Employment Agencies Convention (Revised), 1949

The Protection of Wages Convention, 1949 is an International Labour Organization (ILO) Convention. It was established in 1949, with the preamble stating:

Having decided upon the adoption of certain proposals concerning the protection of wages,...

This convention is referred to in the preamble to the Abolition of Forced Labour Convention of 1957.

== Modification ==
The convention was subsequently revised by Convention C173, Protection of Workers' Claims (Employer's Insolvency) Convention, 1992.

== Ratifications ==
As of 2021, the convention had been ratified by 99 states. Subsequent to ratification, one state, the United Kingdom, renounced the treaty on 16 September 1983.
