= Labour Statistics Convention, 1985 =

International Labour Organization Convention

C160
- ILO Convention
- Date of adoption: 25 June 1985
- Date in force: 24 April 1988
- Classification: Labour Statistics
- Subject: Labour Administration and Inspection
- Previous: Vocational Rehabilitation and Employment (Disabled Persons) Convention, 1983
- Next: Occupational Health Services Convention, 1985

Labour Statistics Convention, 1985 is an International Labour Organization Convention.

It was established in 1985, with the preamble stating:

Having decided upon the adoption of certain proposals with regard to the revision of the Convention concerning Statistics of Wages and Hours of Work, 1938 (No. 63), ...

== Ratifications ==
As of 2023, the convention had been ratified by 51 states.

Country	Date	Status
Armenia	29 Apr 2005	In Force
Australia	15 May 1987	In Force
Austria	03 Jun 1987	In Force
Azerbaijan	19 May 1992	In Force
Belarus	12 Oct 1990	In Force
Bolivia	14 Nov 1990	In Force
Brazil	02 Jul 1990	In Force
Canada	22 Nov 1995	In Force
Colombia	23 Mar 1990	In Force
Costa Rica	13 Feb 2001	In Force
Cyprus	01 Dec 1987	In Force
Czech Republic	01 Jan 1993	In Force
Denmark	22 Jan 1988	In Force
El Salvador	24 Apr 1987	In Force
Eswatini	22 Sep 1992	In Force
Finland	27 Apr 1987	In Force
Germany	25 Apr 1991	In Force
Greece	17 Mar 1993	In Force
Guatemala	07 Apr 1993	In Force
Hungary	09 Apr 2010	In Force
India	01 Apr 1992	In Force
Ireland	27 Oct 1995	In Force
Israel	21 Jan 2010	In Force
Italy	08 Nov 1989	In Force
Ivory Coast	01 Apr 2016	In Force
Kyrgyzstan	31 Mar 1992	In Force
Latvia	10 Jun 1994	In Force
Lithuania	10 Jun 1999	In Force
Mauritius	14 Jun 1994	In Force
Mexico	18 Apr 1988	In Force
Moldova	10 Feb 2012	In Force
Netherlands	05 Oct 1990	In Force
New Zealand	06 Nov 2001	In Force
Norway	06 Aug 1987	In Force
Panama	03 Apr 1996	In Force
Poland	24 Apr 1991	In Force
Portugal	08 Dec 1993	In Force
Russia	27 Aug 1990	In Force
San Marino	01 Jul 1988	In Force
Sierra Leone	29 Mar 2022	In Force
Slovakia	01 Jan 1993	In Force
Spain	03 Oct 1989	In Force
South Korea	08 Dec 1997	In Force
Sri Lanka	01 Apr 1993	In Force
Sweden	22 Sep 1986	In Force
Switzerland	07 May 1987	In Force
Tajikistan	26 Nov 1993	In Force
Ukraine	15 Aug 1991	In Force
United Kingdom	27 May 1987	In Force
United States	11 Jun 1990	In Force
