= Tripartite Consultation (International Labour Standards) Convention, 1976 =

International Labour Organization Convention

C144 Tripartite Consultation (International Labour Standards) Convention
Convention concerning tripartite consultations to promote the implementation of international labour standards
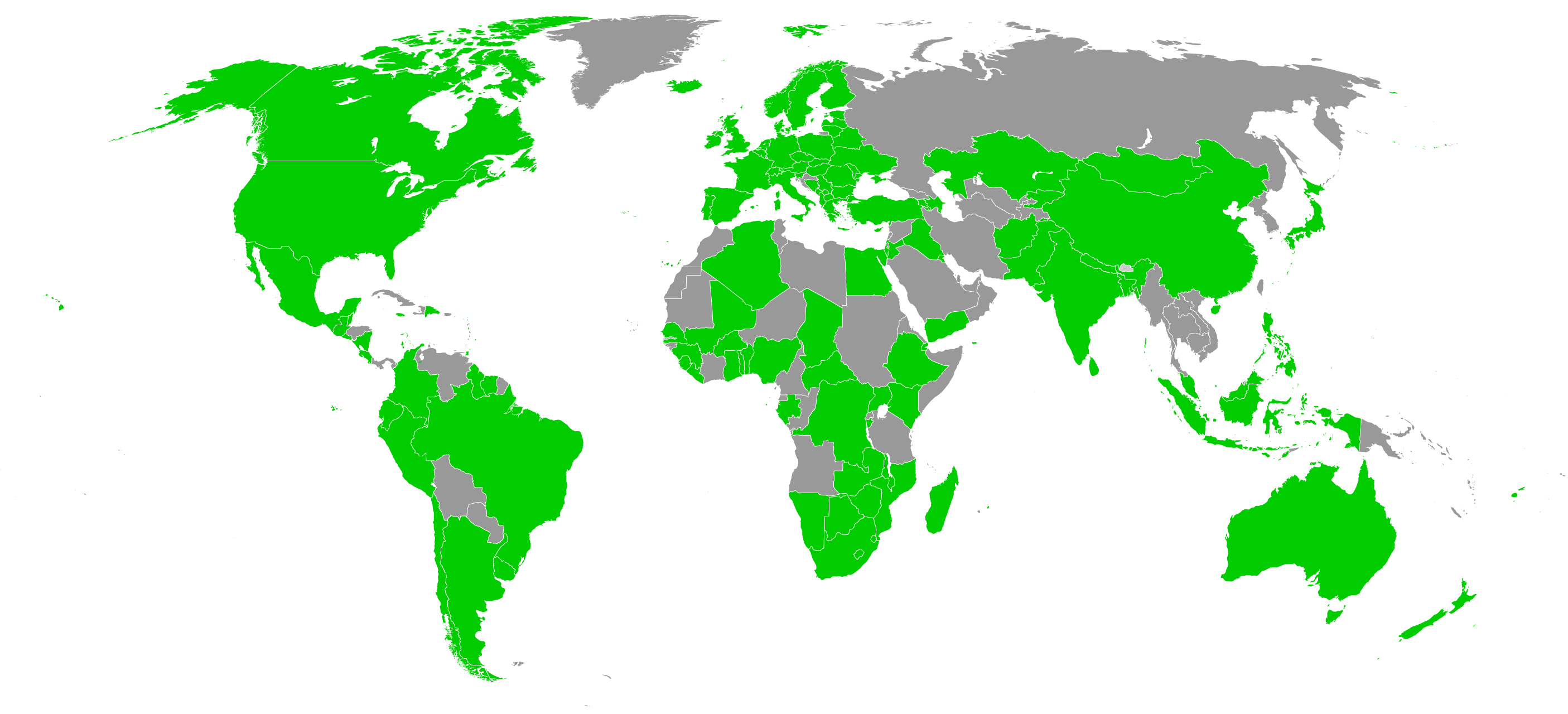
- Contracting States to the Convention
- Signed: 21 June 1976
- Location: Geneva
- Effective: 16 May 1978
- Condition: 2 ratifications
- Parties: 156
- Depositary: Director-General of the International Labour Office
- Languages: French and English

The Tripartite Consultation (International Labour Standards) Convention, 1976, officially the Convention concerning tripartite consultations to promote the implementation of international labour standards, is an International Labour Organization Convention, that governs the process for implementation of measures regarding ILO conferences. It requires tripartite consultation before ratification, implementing legislation or denouncement of conventions.

== Ratifications ==
As of April 2026, the convention had been ratified by at least 159 member states. The convention is also known as convention number 144 on the List of International Labour Organization Conventions.

Country	Date
Afghanistan	07 Apr 2010
Albania	30 Jun 1999
Algeria	12 Jul 1993
Angola	24 Apr 2020
Antigua and Barbuda	16 Sep 2002
Armenia	29 Apr 2005
Australia	11 Jun 1979
Austria	02 Mar 1979
Azerbaijan	12 Aug 1993
Bahamas	16 Aug 1979
Bangladesh	17 Apr 1979
Barbados	06 Apr 1983
Belarus	15 Sep 1993
Belgium	29 Oct 1982
Belize	06 Mar 2000
Benin	11 Jun 2001
Bosnia and Herzegovina	11 Jul 2006
Botswana	05 Jun 1997
Brazil	27 Sep 1994
Bulgaria	12 Jun 1998
Burkina Faso	25 Jul 2001
Burundi	10 Oct 1997
Cape Verde	10 Jan 2020
Cameroon	01 Jun 2018
Canada	13 Jun 2011
Central African Republic	05 Jun 2006
Chad	07 Jan 1998
Chile	29 Jul 1992
China	02 Nov 1990
Colombia	09 Nov 1999
Comoros	06 Jun 2014
Congo	26 Nov 1999
Cook Islands	15 Aug 2018
Costa Rica	29 Jul 1981
Croatia	26 Feb 2020
Cyprus	28 Jun 1977
Czech Republic	09 Oct 2000
Ivory Coast	05 Jun 1987
Democratic Republic of the Congo	20 Jun 2001
Denmark	06 Jun 1978
Djibouti	28 Feb 2005
Dominica	29 Apr 2002
Dominican Republic	15 Jun 1999
Ecuador	23 Nov 1979
Egypt	25 Mar 1982
El Salvador	15 Jun 1995
Estonia	22 Mar 1994
Eswatini	05 Jun 1981
Ethiopia	06 Jun 2011
Fiji	18 May 1998
Finland	02 Oct 1978
France	08 Jun 1982
Gabon	06 Dec 1988
Georgia	08 May 2018
Germany	23 Jul 1979
Ghana	06 Jun 2011
Greece	28 Aug 1981
Grenada	25 Oct 1994
Guatemala	13 Jun 1989
Guinea	16 Oct 1995
Guyana	10 Jan 1983
Honduras	12 Jun 2012
Hungary	04 Jan 1994
Iceland	30 Jun 1981
India	27 Feb 1978
Indonesia	17 Oct 1990
Iraq	11 Sep 1978
Ireland	22 Jun 1979
Israel	21 Jan 2010
Italy	18 Oct 1979
Jamaica	23 Oct 1996
Japan	14 Jun 2002
Jordan	05 Aug 2003
Kazakhstan	13 Dec 2000
Kenya	06 Jun 1990
Kiribati	26 Jun 2019
Kuwait	15 Aug 2000
Kyrgyzstan	12 Jan 2007
Lao People's Democratic Republic	29 Oct 2010
Latvia	25 Jul 1994
Lesotho	27 Jan 1998
Liberia	25 Mar 2003
Lithuania	26 Sep 1994
Luxembourg	18 Mar 2021
Madagascar	22 Apr 1997
Malawi	01 Oct 1986
Malaysia	14 Jun 2002
Mali	23 Jan 2008
Malta	14 Feb 2019
Mauritania	23 Sep 2019
Mauritius	14 Jun 1994
Mexico	28 Jun 1978
Mongolia	10 Aug 1998
Montenegro	03 Jun 2006
Morocco	16 May 2013
Mozambique	23 Dec 1996
Namibia	03 Jan 1995
Nepal	21 Mar 1995
Netherlands	27 Jul 1978
New Zealand	05 Jun 1987
Nicaragua	01 Oct 1981
Niger	15 Mar 2018
Nigeria	03 May 1994
North Macedonia	08 Dec 2005
Norway	09 Aug 1977
Pakistan	25 Oct 1994
Panama	11 Jun 2015
Peru	08 Nov 2004
Philippines	10 Jun 1991
Poland	15 Mar 1993
Portugal	09 Jan 1981
Republic of Korea	15 Nov 1999
Republic of Moldova	12 Aug 1996
Romania	09 Dec 1992
Russian Federation	18 Dec 2014
Rwanda	29 Jun 2018
Saint Kitts and Nevis	12 Oct 2000
Saint Lucia	29 Apr 2026
Saint Vincent and the Grenadines	09 Nov 2010
Samoa	05 Dec 2018
San Marino	23 May 1985
Sao Tome and Principe	17 Jun 1992
Senegal	19 Nov 2004
Serbia	13 May 2005
Seychelles	28 Oct 2005
Sierra Leone	21 Jan 1985
Singapore	04 Oct 2010
Slovakia	10 Feb 1997
Slovenia	29 Jun 2011
Somalia	8 Mar 2021
South Africa	18 Feb 2003
Spain	13 Feb 1984
Sri Lanka	17 Mar 1994
Sudan	17 Mar 2021
Suriname	16 Nov 1979
Sweden	16 May 1977
Switzerland	28 Jun 2000
Syrian Arab Republic	28 May 1985
Tajikistan	23 Jan 2014
Thailand	12 Jun 2024
Togo	08 Nov 1983
Trinidad and Tobago	07 Jun 1995
Tunisia	11 Feb 2014
Turkmenistan	09 Sep 2019
Turkey	12 Jul 1993
Uganda	13 Jan 1994
Ukraine	16 May 1994
United Kingdom	15 Feb 1977
United Republic of Tanzania	30 May 1983
United States of America	15 Jun 1988
Uruguay	22 May 1987
Uzbekistan	13 Aug 2019
Venezuela	17 Jun 1983
Viet Nam	09 Jun 2008
Yemen	15 Jun 2000
Zambia	04 Dec 1978
Zimbabwe	14 Dec 1989
