= Plantations Convention, 1958 =

International Labour Organization Convention

C110
- ILO Convention
- Date of adoption: June 24, 1958
- Date in force: January 22, 1960
- Classification: Plantation Workers
- Subject: Categories of Workers
- Previous: Wages, Hours of Work and Manning (Sea) Convention (Revised), 1958
- Next: Discrimination (Employment and Occupation) Convention, 1958

Plantations Convention, 1958 is an International Labour Organization Convention.

It was established in 1958, with the preamble stating:

Having considered the question of conditions of employment of plantation workers,...

== Ratifications ==
As of 2022, the convention has been ratified by 12 states. Two of the ratifying states—Brazil and Liberia—have subsequently denounced the treaty.
