= Nursing Personnel Convention, 1977 =

International Labour Organization Convention

C149
- ILO Convention
- Date of adoption: June 21, 1977
- Date in force: July 11, 1979
- Classification: Nursing Personnel
- Subject: Specific Categories of Workers
- Previous: Working Environment (Air Pollution, Noise and Vibration) Convention, 1977
- Next: Labour Administration Convention, 1978

Nursing Personnel Convention, 1977 is an International Labour Organization Convention.

It was established in 1977, with the preamble stating:

Having decided upon the adoption of certain proposals with regard to employment and conditions of work and life of nursing personnel,...

== Ratifications ==
As of 2023, the convention had been ratified by 41 states.

Country	Date	Status
Azerbaijan	19 May 1992	In Force
Bangladesh	17 Apr 1979	In Force
Belarus	3 May 1979	In Force
Belgium	29 Mar 1988	In Force
Congo	24 Jun 1986	In Force
Denmark	05 Jun 1981	In Force
Ecuador	11 Jul 1978	In Force
Egypt	03 Nov 1982	In Force
El Salvador	30 Jan 2013	In Force
Fiji	28 May 2008	In Force
Finland	08 Jun 1979	In Force
France	10 Sep 1984	In Force
Ghana	27 May 1986	In Force
Greece	17 Mar 1987	In Force
Guatemala	9 May 1995	In Force
Guinea	08 Jun 1982	In Force
Guyana	10 Jan 1983	In Force
Iraq	04 Jun 1980	In Force
Italy	28 Feb 1985	In Force
Jamaica	04 Jun 1984	In Force
Kenya	06 Jun 1990	In Force
Kyrgyzstan	31 Mar 1992	In Force
Latvia	08 Mar 1993	In Force
Lithuania	12 Jun 2007	In Force
Luxembourg	08 Apr 2008	In Force
Malawi	01 Oct 1986	In Force
Malta	18 May 1990	In Force
Norway	05 Jul 1989	In Force
Philippines	18 Jun 1979	In Force
Poland	04 Nov 1980	In Force
Portugal	28 May 1985	In Force
Russian Federation	3 May 1979	In Force
Seychelles	12 Oct 1993	In Force
Slovenia	30 Jan 2003	In Force
Sweden	10 Jul 1978	In Force
Tajikistan	26 Nov 1993	In Force
Ukraine	3 May 1979	In Force
Tanzania	30 May 1983	In Force
Uruguay	31 Jul 1980	In Force
Venezuela	17 Aug 1983	In Force
Zambia	19 Aug 1980	In Force
