= Human Resources Development Convention, 1975 =

International Labour Organization Convention

C142
- ILO Convention
- Date of adoption: June 23, 1975
- Date in force: July 19, 1977
- Classification: Training
- Subject: Vocational Guidance and Training
- Previous: Rural Workers' Organisations Convention, 1975
- Next: Migrant Workers (Supplementary Provisions) Convention, 1975

Human Resources Development Convention, 1975 is an International Labour Organization Convention.

It was established in 1975:

Having decided upon the adoption of certain proposals with regard to human resources development: vocational guidance and vocational training, ...

== Ratifications ==
As of 2022, the convention has been ratified by 68 states.
