= Vocational Rehabilitation and Employment (Disabled Persons) Convention, 1983 =

International Labour Organization Convention

C159
- ILO Convention
- Date of adoption: June 20, 1983
- Date in force: June 20, 1985
- Classification: Disabled Persons
- Subject: Employment policy and Promotion
- Previous: Termination of Employment Convention, 1982
- Next: Labour Statistics Convention, 1985

Vocational Rehabilitation and Employment (Disabled Persons) Convention, 1983 is an International Labour Organization Convention.

It was established in 1983, with the preamble stating:

Having decided upon the adoption of certain proposals with regard to vocational rehabilitation...

== Ratifications ==
As of 2022, the treaty has been ratified by 85 states.

Country	Date	Notes
Afghanistan	2010-04-07	-
Argentina	1987-04-14	-
Australia	1990-08-07	-
Azerbaijan	1992-05-19	-
Bahamas	2022-11-30	will enter into force on 30 Nov 2023
Bahrain	1999-02-02	-
Belgium	2015-06-10	-
Bolivia	1996-12-19	-
Bosnia and Herzegovina	1993-06-02	-
Brazil	1990-05-18	-
Burkina Faso	1989-05-26	-
Chile	1994-10-14	-
China	1988-02-02	-
Colombia	1989-12-07	-
Costa Rica	1991-07-23	-
Côte d'Ivoire	1999-10-22	-
Croatia	1991-10-08	-
Cuba	1996-10-03	-
Cyprus	1987-04-13	-
Czech Republic	1993-01-01	-
Denmark	1985-04-01	-
Dominican Republic	1994-06-20	-
Ecuador	1988-05-20	-
Egypt	1988-08-03	-
El Salvador	1986-12-19	-
Ethiopia	1991-01-28	-
Fiji	2004-12-01	-
Finland	1985-04-24	-
France	1989-03-16	-
Germany	1989-11-14	-
Greece	1985-07-31	-
Guatemala	1994-04-05	-
Guinea	1995-10-16	-
Hungary	1984-06-20	-
Iceland	1990-06-22	-
Ireland	1986-06-06	-
Italy	2000-06-07	-
Japan	1992-06-12	-
Jordan	2003-05-13	-
Republic of Korea	1999-11-15	-
Kuwait	1998-06-26	-
Kyrgyzstan	1992-03-31	-
Lebanon	2000-02-23	-
Lithuania	1994-09-26	-
Luxembourg	2001-03-21	-
Macedonia	1991-11-17	-
Madagascar	1998-06-03	-
Malawi	1986-10-01	-
Mali	1995-06-12	-
Malta	1988-06-09	-
Mauritius	2004-06-09	-
Mexico	2001-04-05	-
Mongolia	1998-02-03	-
Montenegro	2006-06-03	-
Netherlands	1988-02-15	-
Nigeria	2010-08-26	-
Norway	1984-08-13	-
Pakistan	1994-10-25	-
Panama	1994-01-28	-
Paraguay	1991-05-02	-
Peru	1986-06-16	-
Philippines	1991-08-23	-
Poland	2004-12-02	-
Portugal	1999-05-03	-
Russian Federation	1988-06-03	ratified as the Soviet Union
San Marino	1985-05-23	-
São Tomé and Príncipe	1992-06-17	-
Serbia	2000-11-24	ratified as the Federal Republic of Yugoslavia
Slovakia	1993-01-01	-
Slovenia	1992-05-29	-
Spain	1990-08-02	-
Sweden	1984-06-12	-
Switzerland	1985-06-20	-
Tajikistan	1993-11-26	-
Thailand	2007-10-11	-
Trinidad and Tobago	1999-06-03	-
Tunisia	1989-09-05	-
Turkey	2000-06-26	-
Uganda	1990-03-27	-
Ukraine	2003-05-15	-
Uruguay	1988-01-13	-
Vietnam	2019-03-25	-
Yemen	1991-11-18	-
Zambia	1989-01-05	-
Zimbabwe	1998-07-27	-
