= Labour Clauses (Public Contracts) Convention, 1949 =

International Labour Organization

C94
- ILO Convention
- Date of adoption: 29 June 1949
- Date in force: 20 September 1952
- Classification: Wages – Wage Payment Systems
- Subject: Wages
- Previous: Wages, Hours of Work and Manning (Sea) Convention (Revised), 1949
- Next: Protection of Wages Convention, 1949

Labour Clauses (Public Contracts) Convention, 1949 is an International Labour Organization (ILO) Convention adopted in Geneva on 29 June 1949. Its preamble states:

Having decided upon the adoption of certain proposals concerning labour clauses in public contracts ....

The convention requires subscribing states to ensure that public procurement contracts contain clauses ensuring that workers performing the contract would be entitled to "wages ..., hours of work and other conditions" which would be "not less favourable than those established for work of the same character in the trade or industry concerned in the district where the work is carried on".

== Ratifications ==
As of February 2023, the convention had 62 state parties. Although the United Kingdom was the first country to ratify the convention, Norman Tebbitt, Secretary of State for Employment, arranged for the UK government to renounce it on 20 September 1982. Article 14 makes provision for states which have ratified the convention to denounce it on provision of due notice to the Director-General of the ILO.
