= Accommodation of Crews (Supplementary Provisions) Convention, 1970 =

International Labour Organization Convention

C133
- ILO Convention
- Date of adoption: October 30, 1970
- Date in force: August 27, 1991
- Classification: Safety, Health and Welfare
- Subject: Seafarers
- Previous: Holidays with Pay Convention (Revised), 1970
- Next: Prevention of Accidents (Seafarers) Convention, 1970

Accommodation of Crews (Supplementary Provisions) Convention, 1970 is an International Labour Organization Convention. It was ratified by the ILO's Governing Body in Geneva October 14, 1970, as a supplement to the Accommodation of Crews Convention (Revised), 1949.

== Content ==
The earlier convention considered such shipboard matters as:

- sleeping accommodation,
- mess and recreation rooms,
- ventilation,
- heating,
- lighting, and
- sanitary facilities.

The supplementary provisions were needed because of significant changes in the construction and operation of merchant vessels.

The provisions apply to sea-going ships, publicly or privately owned, engaged in cargo transport, passengers trade, or any other commercial purpose, registered in a territory which ratified the convention. It does not apply to ships built before the provisions came into force, and to some classes of vessels such as ships of less than 1,000 tons, ships primarily propelled by sail, ships engaged in fishing or whaling, and hydrofoils and air-cushion craft.

Articles 1 through 4 of the provisions cover which vessels are subject to the provisions, definitions, and certain legal requirements for countries which adopt the Convention.

Article 5 deals with standards for sleeping quarters. This includes the minimum square-footage of sleeping quarters and the number of persons that can be assigned to one room. It also specifies that the chief engineer and the chief officer shall have a sitting room or day room adjoining their cabin.

Article 6 is concerned with mess rooms. It specifies square footage and the availability of a refrigerator, and facilities for hot beverages and cool water.

Article 7 addresses recreation rooms. It specifies that a recreation room must include a bookcase, facilitate reading and writing, if possible, be suitable for playing games. It goes on to require that larger ships must have a smoking room or library set up to show films or television. These larger ships are also required to have a hobby and games room. It also recommends that a swimming pool be provided.

Article 8 is concerned with sanitary facilities. This includes the provision of washbasins, bathrooms, and bathtubs or showers. It also requires that when women are employed on board a vessel that they have separate sanitary facilities. Article 8 also requires that facilities for washing, drying and ironing clothes be made available.

Article 9 requires that ships to which it applies provide a toilet and sink with hot and cold running water be provided in rooms near the navigation bridge and engine room. It also requires a changing and locker room for engine room personnel.

Article 10 requires that, with some exceptions, headroom in crew accommodation spaces may not be less than 198 cm or 6 feet 6 inches.

Article 11 is concerned with lighting. It requires that crew accommodation spaces be properly lighted. It includes requirements for the provision of natural and artificial lights, and the provision of emergency lighting as required. It also requires that a reading lamp be located at the head of each bed.

Article 12 allows a certain flexibility in the rules to accommodate "crews having differing and distinctive religious and social practices."

== Ratifications ==
As of 2023, the convention has been ratified by 32 states. Of the ratifying states, 14 have denounced the treaty.

Country	Date	Notes
Australia	June 11, 1992	denounced
Azerbaijan	May 19, 1992	
Belize	July 15, 2005	
Brazil	April 4, 1992	
Côte d'Ivoire	June 19, 1972	
Denmark	July 10, 2003	denounced
Finland	November 22, 1974	denounced
France	March 24, 1972	denounced
Germany	August 14, 1974	
Greece	September 24, 1986	denounced
Guinea	May 26, 1977	
Israel	August 21, 1980	
Italy	June 23, 1981	
Kyrgyzstan	March 31, 1992	
Latvia	January 13, 2006	denounced
Lebanon	June 12, 1993	
Liberia	August 5, 1978	denounced
Luxembourg	November 30, 2005	denounced
Republic of Moldova	December 12, 2005	
Netherlands	August 1, 1985	denounced
New Zealand	May 31, 1977	
Nigeria	June 12, 1973	denounced
Norway	March 14, 1975	denounced
Poland	September 10, 1975	denounced
Romania	October 11, 2000	
Russian Federation (as the Soviet Union)	August 27, 1990	denounced by Russia
Sweden	February 17, 1972	denounced
Tajikistan	November 26, 1993	
Turkey	March 17, 2005	
Ukraine	August 24, 1993	
United Kingdom	March 26, 1981	
Uruguay	February 2, 1977	
