= Holidays with Pay Convention (Revised), 1970 =

International Labour Organization Convention

C132
- ILO Convention
- Date of adoption: June 24, 1970
- Date in force: June 30, 1973
- Classification: Paid Leave
- Subject: Paid holidays
- Previous: Minimum Wage Fixing Convention, 1970
- Next: Accommodation of Crews (Supplementary Provisions) Convention, 1970

Holidays with Pay Convention (Revised), 1970 is an International Labour Organization Convention.

It was established in 1970:

Having decided upon the adoption of certain proposals with regard to holidays with pay,...

== Provision ==
The central provision of the convention is found in Article 3, which states that people to whom the convention applies shall be entitled to an annual paid holiday of a specified minimum length, and that although the ratifying state may select the length of the minimum holiday, it "shall in no case be less than three working weeks for one year of service".

== Modification ==
This Convention revised Convention C52 – Holidays with Pay Convention, 1936.

== Ratifications ==
As of 2026, the convention has been ratified by 39 states.

Country	Year of ratification	Declared minimum number of paid holidays per year	Notes
Armenia	2006	28 days	
Azerbaijan	2016	24 days	
Belarus	2020	20 days	
Belgium	2003	24 calendar days	
Bosnia and Herzegovina	1993	18 working days	
Brazil	1998	30 working days	
Burkina Faso	1974	one calendar month	
Cameroon	1973	3 weeks	
Chad	2000	24 working days	
Croatia	1991	18 working days	
Czech Republic	1996	3 weeks	
Finland	1990	24 working days	
Germany	1975	18 working days	
Guinea	1977	one calendar month	
Hungary	1998	20 working days	
Iraq	1974	3 weeks	
Ireland	1974	3 weeks	
Italy	1981	3 weeks	
Kenya	1979	21 working days	
Latvia	1994	4 weeks	
Luxembourg	1975	25 working days	
Republic of Macedonia	1991	18 working days	
Madagascar	1972	3 weeks	
Malta	1988	21 working days	
Moldova	1998	24 working days	
Montenegro	2006	18 working days	
Norway	1973	24 working days	
Portugal	1981	21 days	
Russia	2010	28 calendar days	
Rwanda	1991	18 working days	
Serbia (as Federal Republic of Yugoslavia)	2000	20 working days	
Slovenia	1992	18 working days	
Spain	1972	3 weeks	
Sweden	1978	5 weeks	
Switzerland	1992	4 weeks	5 weeks for workers under 20 years old
Ukraine	2001	24 calendar days	
Uruguay	1977	20 working days	
Uzbekistan	2025	21 calander days	
Yemen (as North Yemen)	1976	21 days (workers); 30 days (employees)	
