= Part-Time Work Convention, 1994 =

International Labour Organization Convention

C175
- ILO Convention
- Date of adoption: June 24, 1994
- Date in force: February 28, 1998
- Classification: Arrangement of Working Time
- Subject: Part-time Working
- Previous: Prevention of Major Industrial Accidents Convention, 1993
- Next: Safety and Health in Mines Convention, 1995

Part-Time Work Convention, 1994 is an International Labour Organization Convention for protection of part-time workers including the rights to equal pay for equal work.

It was established in 1994, with the preamble stating:

Recognizing the importance of productive and freely chosen employment for all workers, the economic importance of part-time work, the need for employment policies to take into account the role of part-time work in facilitating additional employment opportunities, and the need to ensure protection for part-time workers in the areas of access to employment, working conditions and social security, and

Having decided upon the adoption of certain proposals with regard to part-time work,...

== Ratifications ==
As of February 2023, the convention has been ratified by 20 states.

Country	Date	Status
Albania	03 Mar 2003	In Force
Australia	10 Aug 2011	In Force
Belgium	08 Jun 2016	In Force
Bosnia and Herzegovina	18 Jan 2010	In Force
Cyprus	28 Feb 1997	In Force
Finland	25 May 1999	In Force
Guatemala	28 Feb 2017	In Force
Guyana	03 Sep 1997	In Force
Hungary	09 Apr 2010	In Force
Italy	13 Apr 2000	In Force
Kazakhstan	25 May 2022	Will enter into force on 25 May 2023
Luxembourg	21 Mar 2001	In Force
Mauritius	14 Jun 1996	In Force
Netherlands	05 Feb 2001	In Force
Paraguay	29 Nov 2021	In Force
Portugal	02 Jun 2006	In Force
Russian Federation	29 Apr 2016	In Force
Slovenia	8 May 2001	In Force
Sudan	04 Oct 2019	In Force
Sweden	10 Jun 2002	In Force
