= Labour Relations (Public Service) Convention, 1978 =

International Labour Organization Convention

C151
- ILO Convention
- Date of adoption: June 27, 1978
- Date in force: February 25, 1981
- Classification: Freedom of Association; Collective Bargaining and Agreements
- Subject: Freedom of Association, Collective Bargaining, and Industrial Relations
- Previous: Labour Administration Convention, 1978
- Next: Occupational Safety and Health (Dock Work) Convention, 1979

Labour Relations (Public Service) Convention, 1978 is an International Labour Organization Convention.

It was established in 1978, with the preamble stating:

Having decided upon the adoption of certain proposals with regard to freedom of association and procedures for determining conditions of employment in the public service,...

== Ratifications ==
As of March 2023, the convention has been ratified by 58 states:

Country	Date of ratification	Status
Albania	30 Jun 1999	In force
Antigua and Barbuda	16 Sep 2002	In force
Argentina	21 Jan 1987	In force
Armenia	29 Jul 1994	In force
Azerbaijan	11 Mar 1993	In force
Belarus	08 Sep 1997	In force
Belgium	21 May 1991	In force
Belize	22 Jun 1999	In force
Bosnia and Herzegovina	31 Mar 2015	In force
Botswana	22 Dec 1997	In force
Brazil	15 Jun 2010	In force
Chad	07 Jan 1998	In force
Chile	17 Jul 2000	In force
Colombia	08 Dec 2000	In force
Cuba	29 Dec 1980	In force
Cyprus	06 Jul 1981	In force
Denmark	05 Jun 1981	In force
El Salvador	06 Sep 2006	In force
Finland	25 Feb 1980	In force
Gabon	01 Oct 2009	In force
Georgia	10 Oct 2003	In force
Ghana	27 May 1986	In force
Greece	29 Jul 1996	In force
Guinea	08 Jun 1982	In force
Guyana	10 Jan 1983	In force
Hungary	04 Jan 1994	In force
Italy	28 Feb 1985	In force
Latvia	27 Jan 1992	In force
Lesotho	15 Mar 2023	Will enter into force on 15 Mar 2024
Luxembourg	21 Mar 2001	In force
Madagascar	11 June 2019	In force
Mali	12 Jun 1995	In force
Moldova	04 Apr 2003	In force
Montenegro	09 Apr 2019	In force
Morocco	04 Jun 2013	In force
Namibia	20 Sep 2018	In force
Netherlands	29 Nov 1988	In force
North Macedonia	22 Jul 2013	In force
Norway	19 Mar 1980	In force
Peru	27 Oct 1980	In force
Philippines	10 Oct 2017	In force
Poland	26 Jul 1982	In force
Portugal	09 Jan 1981	In force
Russia	19 Sep 2014	In force
San Marino	19 Apr 1988	In force
São Tomé and Príncipe	4 May 2005	In force
Seychelles	23 Nov 1999	In force
Slovakia	22 Feb 2010	In force
Slovenia	20 Sep 2010	In force
Spain	18 Sep 1984	In force
Suriname	29 Sep 1981	In force
Sweden	11 Jun 1979	In force
Switzerland	03 Mar 1981	In force
Tunisia	11 Feb 2014	In force
Turkey	12 Jul 1993	In force
United Kingdom	19 Mar 1980	In force
Uruguay	19 Jun 1989	In force
