= Dock Work Convention, 1973 =

International Labour Organization Convention

C137
- ILO Convention
- Date of adoption: June 25, 1973
- Date in force: July 24, 1975
- Classification: Dockworkers
- Subject: Dockworkers
- Previous: Benzene Convention, 1971
- Next: Minimum Age Convention, 1973

Dock Work Convention, 1973 is an International Labour Organization Convention.

It was established in 1973:

Considering that important changes have taken place and are taking place in cargo-handling methods in docks—such as the adoption of unit loads, the introduction of roll-on roll-off techniques and the increase of mechanisation and automation—and in the pattern of movement of freight, and that such changes are expected to become more widespread in the future,...

== Ratifications ==
As of January 2023, the convention has been ratified by 25 states, with the most recent ratification being completed by the Russian Federation in 2004. One of the ratifying states, the Netherlands, has denounced the treaty.

Country	Date	Status
Afghanistan	16 May 1979	In Force
Australia	25 Jun 1974	In Force
Brazil	12 Aug 1994	In Force
Costa Rica	03 Jul 1975	In Force
Cuba	07 Jan 1975	In Force
Egypt	04 Aug 1982	In Force
Finland	13 Jan 1976	In Force
France	15 Feb 1977	In Force
Guyana	10 Jan 1983	In Force
Iraq	09 Mar 1978	In Force
Italy	23 Jun 1981	In Force
Kenya	09 Apr 1979	In Force
Mauritius	18 Mar 2003	In Force
Netherlands	14 Sep 1976	Denounced on 17 Feb 2006
Nicaragua	01 Oct 1981	In Force
Nigeria	22 Mar 2004	In Force
Norway	21 Oct 1974	In Force
Poland	22 Feb 1979	In Force
Portugal	09 Jan 1981	In Force
Romania	28 Oct 1975	In Force
Russian Federation	14 Jul 2004	In Force
Spain	22 Apr 1975	In Force
Sweden	24 Jul 1974	In Force
United Republic of Tanzania	30 May 1983	In Force
Uruguay	31 Jul 1980	In Force
