= Merchant Shipping (Minimum Standards) Convention, 1976 =

International Labour Organization Convention

C147
- ILO Convention
- Date of adoption: October 29, 1976
- Date in force: November 28, 1981
- Classification: Seafarers
- Subject: Seafarers
- Previous: Seafarers' Annual Leave with Pay Convention, 1976
- Next: Working Environment (Air Pollution, Noise and Vibration) Convention, 1977

Merchant Shipping (Minimum Standards) Convention, 1976 is an International Labour Organization Convention.

It was established in 1976, with the preamble stating:

Having decided upon the adoption of certain proposals with regard to substandard vessels, particularly those registered under flags of convenience, ...

== Ratifications ==
Protocol of 1996 to the Merchant Shipping (Minimum Standards) Convention, 1976

Having determined that these proposals should take the form of a Protocol to the principal Convention;

adopts, this twenty-second day of October one thousand nine hundred and ninety-six, the following Protocol, which may be cited as the Protocol of 1996 to the Merchant Shipping (Minimum Standards) Convention, 1976.

As of 2023, the convention had been ratified by 56 states. Of these ratifying states, 45 have subsequently denounced the convention.

Country	Date
Azerbaijan	19 May 1992
Costa Rica	24 Jun 1981
Dominica	06 Jan 2004
Egypt	17 Mar 1983
Iraq	15 Feb 1985
Israel	06 Dec 1996
Kyrgyzstan	31 Mar 1992
Peru	06 Jul 2004
Tajikistan	26 Nov 1993
Trinidad and Tobago	03 Jun 1999
Ukraine	17 Mar 1994
United States of America	15 Jun 1988
