= Seafarers' Annual Leave with Pay Convention, 1976 =

International Labour Organization Convention

C146
- ILO Convention
- Date of adoption: November 29, 1976
- Date in force: June 13, 1979
- Classification: Conditions of Work
- Subject: Seafarers
- Previous: Continuity of Employment (Seafarers) Convention, 1976
- Next: Merchant Shipping (Minimum Standards) Convention, 1976

Seafarers' Annual Leave with Pay Convention, 1976 is an International Labour Organization Convention.

It was established in 1976, with the preamble stating:

Having decided upon the adoption of certain proposals with regard to revision of the Paid Vacations (Seafarers) Convention (Revised), 1949 (No. 91), in the light of, but not necessarily restricted to, the Holidays with Pay Convention (Revised), 1970 (No. 132), ...

== Modification ==
The convention revised Convention C91, Paid Vacations (Seafarers) Convention (Revised), 1949 (shelved).

== Ratifications ==
As of 2023, the convention had been ratified by 17 states. Subsequently, 14 of the ratifying states have denounced the treaty.

Country	Date	Status
Cameroon	13 Jun 1978	In Force
Iraq	15 Feb 1985	In Force
Turkey	28 Jul 2005	In Force
