= Conventions Concerning Employment of Women During the Night =

International Labour Organization conventions

The Conventions concerning Employment of Women during the Night are conventions drafted by the International Labour Organization (ILO) which prohibit women from performing industrial work during the night. The first convention was adopted in 1919 (as C04, shortened Night Work (Women) Convention, 1919) and revised versions were adopted in 1934 (C41, Night Work (Women) Convention (Revised), 1934) and 1948 (C89, Night Work (Women) Convention (Revised), 1948). A protocol (P89, Protocol to the Night Work (Women) Convention (Revised), 1948) to the convention was adopted in 1990 allowing for easing of the restriction under conditions. As of April 2011 the conventions had 27, 15, 46 (undenounced) ratifications respectively. The protocol was ratified 5 and denounced by 2.

== Content ==
All three conventions define night work as working during an 11-hour period including the period 10 p.m. and 6 a.m. The prohibition to work for women is for industrial work: mining, manufacturing as well construction and maintenance. In the 1934 convention a provision is included allowing work in managerial functions, while in 1948 the possibility suspension of the convention was included "when in case of serious emergency the national interest demands it".

== Technical provisions ==
All conventions entered into force upon or 12 months after the ratification of two ILO member states. For the first conference, implementing law had to be functional on 1 July 1922 at the latest. The revised conventions and the protocol entered into force 12 months after ratification. As common in later ILO conventions, accession to the 1948 automatically meant denouncement of the 1932 convention (but not the 1919 convention). Denouncement is further possible every 10 years in the year following the 10th, 20th, 30th etc. anniversary of the convention.

== Member states ==
An overview of number of ratifications of the conferences is shown below.

year of conclusion	entry into force	ratifications (current)	denouncements
1919	13 June 1921	27	31
1934	22 November 1936	15	23
1948	27 February 1951	46	21
1990 (protocol)	15 March 1994	3	2

As ratification did not imply denouncement of the 1919 convention, several countries are party to both the 1919 and the 1932 (11) or 1948 (8) convention. Today, these conventions are often perceived as discriminatory and in contradiction with the equality principle, and as such have been denounced by several countries. For example, the 1948 convention was initially ratified by many countries, but it was later (particularly in the 1980s and 1990s) denounced by several of these countries.

== See also ==
- Night Work of Young Persons (Industry) Convention, 1919
- Night Work Conventions
- Underground Work (Women) Convention, 1935
