= Occupational Safety and Health (Dock Work) Convention, 1979 =

International Labour Organization Convention

C152
- ILO Convention
- Date of adoption: June 25, 1979
- Date in force: December 5, 1981
- Classification: Dock Work
- Subject: Dockworkers
- Previous: Labour Relations (Public Service) Convention, 1978
- Next: Hours of Work and Rest Periods (Road Transport) Convention, 1979

Occupational Safety and Health (Dock Work) Convention, 1979 is an International Labour Organization Convention.

It was established in 1979, with the preamble stating:

Having decided upon the adoption of certain proposals with regard to the revision of the Protection against Accidents (Dockers) Convention (Revised), 1932 (No. 32),..

== Modification ==
The principles contained in the convention are a revision of those contained in ILO Convention C32.

== Ratifications ==
As of 2023, the convention has been ratified by 27 states.

Country	Date	Status
Brazil	18 May 1990	In Force
Congo	24 Jun 1986	In Force
Cuba	15 Oct 1982	In Force
Cyprus	13 Nov 1987	In Force
Denmark	22 Dec 1989	In Force
Ecuador	20 May 1988	In Force
Egypt	03 Aug 1988	In Force
Finland	03 Jul 1981	In Force
France	30 Jul 1985	In Force
Germany	17 Dec 1982	In Force
Guinea	08 Jun 1982	In Force
Iraq	17 Apr 1985	In Force
Italy	07 Jun 2000	In Force
Jamaica	04 Nov 2005	In Force
Lebanon	06 Sep 2004	In Force
Mexico	10 Feb 1982	In Force
Moldova	22 Jan 2007	In Force
Montenegro	27 Apr 2017	In Force
Netherlands	13 May 1998	In Force
Norway	05 Dec 1980	In Force
Peru	19 Apr 1988	In Force
Russia	14 Jul 2004	In Force
Seychelles	28 Oct 2005	In Force
Spain	03 Mar 1982	In Force
Sweden	13 Jun 1980	In Force
Tanzania	30 May 1983	In Force
Turkey	17 Mar 2005	In Force
