= Employment Injury Benefits Convention, 1964 =

International Labour Organization Convention

C121
- ILO Convention
- Date of adoption: July 8, 1964
- Date in force: July 28, 1967
- Classification: Employment Injury Benefit
- Subject: Social Security
- Previous: Hygiene (Commerce and Offices) Convention, 1964
- Next: Employment Policy Convention, 1964

Employment Injury Benefits Convention, 1964 is an International Labour Organization Convention.

It was established in 1964, with the preamble stating:

Having decided upon the adoption of certain proposals with regard to benefits in the case of industrial accidents and occupational diseases,...

== Modification ==
The convention revised:

- Convention C12 - Workmen's Compensation (Agriculture) Convention, 1921
- Convention C17 - Workmen's Compensation (Accidents) Convention, 1925
- Convention C42 - Workmen's Compensation (Occupational Diseases) Convention (Revised), 1934.

== Ratifications ==
As of 2022, the convention had been ratified by 24 states.

Country	Date	Status
Belgium	22 Apr 1970	In Force
Bolivia	31 Jan 1977	In Force
Bosnia and Herzegovina	02 Jun 1993	In Force
Chile	30 Sep 1999	In Force
Croatia	08 Oct 1991	In Force
Cyprus	28 Jul 1966	In Force
Democratic Republic of the Congo	05 Sep 1967	In Force
Ecuador	05 Apr 1978	In Force
Finland	23 Sep 1968	In Force
Germany	01 Mar 1972	In Force
Guinea	11 Aug 1967	In Force
Ireland	09 Jun 1969	In Force
Japan	07 Jun 1974	In Force
Libya	19 Jun 1975	In Force
Luxembourg	24 Jul 1972	In Force
Montenegro	03 Jun 2006	In Force
Netherlands	02 Aug 1966	In Force
North Macedonia	17 Nov 1991	In Force
Senegal	25 Apr 1966	In Force
Serbia	24 Nov 2000	In Force
Slovenia	29 May 1992	In Force
Sweden	17 Jun 1969	In Force
Uruguay	28 Jun 1973	In Force
Venezuela	10 Aug 1982	In Force
