= Medical Examination of Young Persons (Industry) Convention, 1946 =

International Labour Organization Convention

C77
- ILO Convention
- Date of adoption: October 9, 1946
- Date in force: December 29, 1950
- Classification: Medical Examination
- Subject: Elimination of Child Labour and Protection of Children and Young Persons
- Previous: Wages, Hours of Work and Manning (Sea) Convention, 1946
- Next: Medical Examination of Young Persons (Non-Industrial Occupations) Convention, 1946

Medical Examination of Young Persons (Industry) Convention, 1946 is an International Labour Organization Convention (No. 77), adopted in 1946 and in force since 29 December 1950, that provides for medical fitness examinations for children and young persons employed or working in connection with industrial undertakings.

It was established in 1946 with the preamble stating:

Having decided upon the adoption of certain proposals with regard to medical examination for fitness for employment in industry of children and young persons,...

== Provisions ==
The convention requires children and young persons under eighteen to be found medically fit before they may be admitted to employment in industrial undertakings. The examination must be carried out by a qualified physician approved by the competent authority, with re-examinations at intervals of not more than one year until age eighteen. For occupations involving high health risks, the convention requires continued medical examinations and re-examinations until at least age twenty-one, and the examination must not involve expense for the child, young person, or parents.

== Ratifications ==
As of August 2026, the convention has 43 ratifications.
