= Workers' Representatives Convention, 1971 =

International Labour Organization Convention

C135
- ILO Convention
- Date of adoption: June 23, 1971
- Date in force: June 30, 1973
- Classification: Freedom of Association; Collective Bargaining and Agreements
- Subject: Freedom of Association, Collective Bargaining, and Industrial Relations
- Previous: Prevention of Accidents (Seafarers) Convention, 1970
- Next: Benzene Convention, 1971

Workers' Representatives Convention, 1971 is an International Labour Organization Convention.

It was established in 1971:

Noting the terms of the Right to Organise and Collective Bargaining Convention, 1949, which provides for protection of workers against acts of anti-union discrimination in respect of their employment, and

Considering that it is desirable to supplement these terms with respect to workers' representatives, and

Having decided upon the adoption of certain proposals with regard to protection and facilities afforded to workers' representatives in the undertaking,...

== Ratifications ==
As of August 2013, the convention has been ratified by 85 states.
