= Safety and Health in Construction Convention, 1988 =

International Labour Organization Convention

C167
- ILO Convention
- Date of adoption: June 20, 1988
- Date in force: January 11, 1991
- Classification: Construction
- Subject: Occupational safety and health
- Previous: Repatriation of Seafarers Convention (Revised), 1987
- Next: Employment Promotion and Protection against Unemployment Convention, 1988

Safety and Health in Construction Convention, 1988 is an International Labour Organization Convention.

It was established in 1988, with the preamble stating:

Having decided upon the adoption of certain proposals with regard to safety and health in construction,...

== Ratifications ==
As of April 2024, the convention had been ratified by 34 states.

Country	Date	Status
Albania	24 Apr 2014	In Force
Algeria	06 Jun 2006	In Force
Belarus	21 Nov 2001	In Force
Belgium	08 Jun 2016	In Force
Bolivia	10 Feb 2015	In Force
Brazil	19 May 2006	In Force
China	07 Mar 2002	In Force
Colombia	06 Sep 1994	In Force
Czech Republic	01 Jan 1993	In Force
Denmark	10 Jul 1995	In Force
Dominican Republic	04 Jun 1998	In Force
Finland	23 Jan 1997	In Force
Gabon	28 Jul 2015	In Force
Germany	18 Nov 1993	In Force
Guatemala	07 Oct 1991	In Force
Guinea	25 Apr 2017	In Force
Hungary	22 May 1989	In Force
Iraq	17 Sep 1990	In Force
Italy	12 Feb 2003	In Force
Kazakhstan	18 Jun 2008	In Force
Lesotho	27 Jan 1998	In Force
Luxembourg	08 Apr 2008	In Force
Mexico	05 Oct 1990	In Force
Mongolia	05 Nov 2020	In Force
Montenegro	18 Sep 2015	In Force
Norway	24 Jun 1991	In Force
Panama	31 Jan 2008	In Force
Russia	29 Oct 2018	In Force
Serbia	16 Sep 2009	In Force
Slovakia	01 Jan 1993	In Force
Sweden	07 Oct 1991	In Force
Turkey	23 Mar 2015	In Force
Uruguay	25 May 2005	In Force
Uzbekistan	09 Jun 2022	In Force
