= Fee-Charging Employment Agencies Convention (Revised), 1949 =

International Labour Organization Convention

C96
- ILO Convention
- Date of adoption: June 1, 1949
- Date in force: July 18, 1951
- Classification: Employment Services - Job Placement
- Subject: Employment policy and Promotion
- Previous: Protection of Wages Convention, 1949
- Next: Migration for Employment Convention (Revised), 1949

Fee-Charging Employment Agencies Convention (Revised), 1949 is an International Labour Organization Convention.

It was established in 1949, with the preamble stating:

Having decided upon the adoption of certain proposals with regard to the revision of the Fee-Charging Employment Agencies Convention, 1933,..

== Modification ==
The convention is a revision of ILO Convention C34, Fee-Charging Employment Agencies Convention, 1933 (shelved).

== Ratifications ==
As of 2023, 42 states have ratified the convention. However, 20 of these states have subsequently denounced the convention, with some doing so through an automatic process that denounces the 1949 convention upon the ratification of a superseding convention.
