= Prevention of Major Industrial Accidents Convention, 1993 =

International Labour Organization Convention

C174
- ILO Convention
- Date of adoption: June 22, 1993
- Date in force: January 3, 1997
- Classification: Occupational Safety
- Subject: Occupational Safety and Health
- Previous: Protection of Workers' Claims (Employer's Insolvency) Convention, 1992
- Next: Part-Time Work Convention, 1994

Prevention of Major Industrial Accidents Convention, 1993 is an International Labour Organization Convention.

It was established in 1993, with the preamble stating:

Having decided upon the adoption of certain proposals with regard to the prevention of major industrial accidents,...

== Ratifications ==
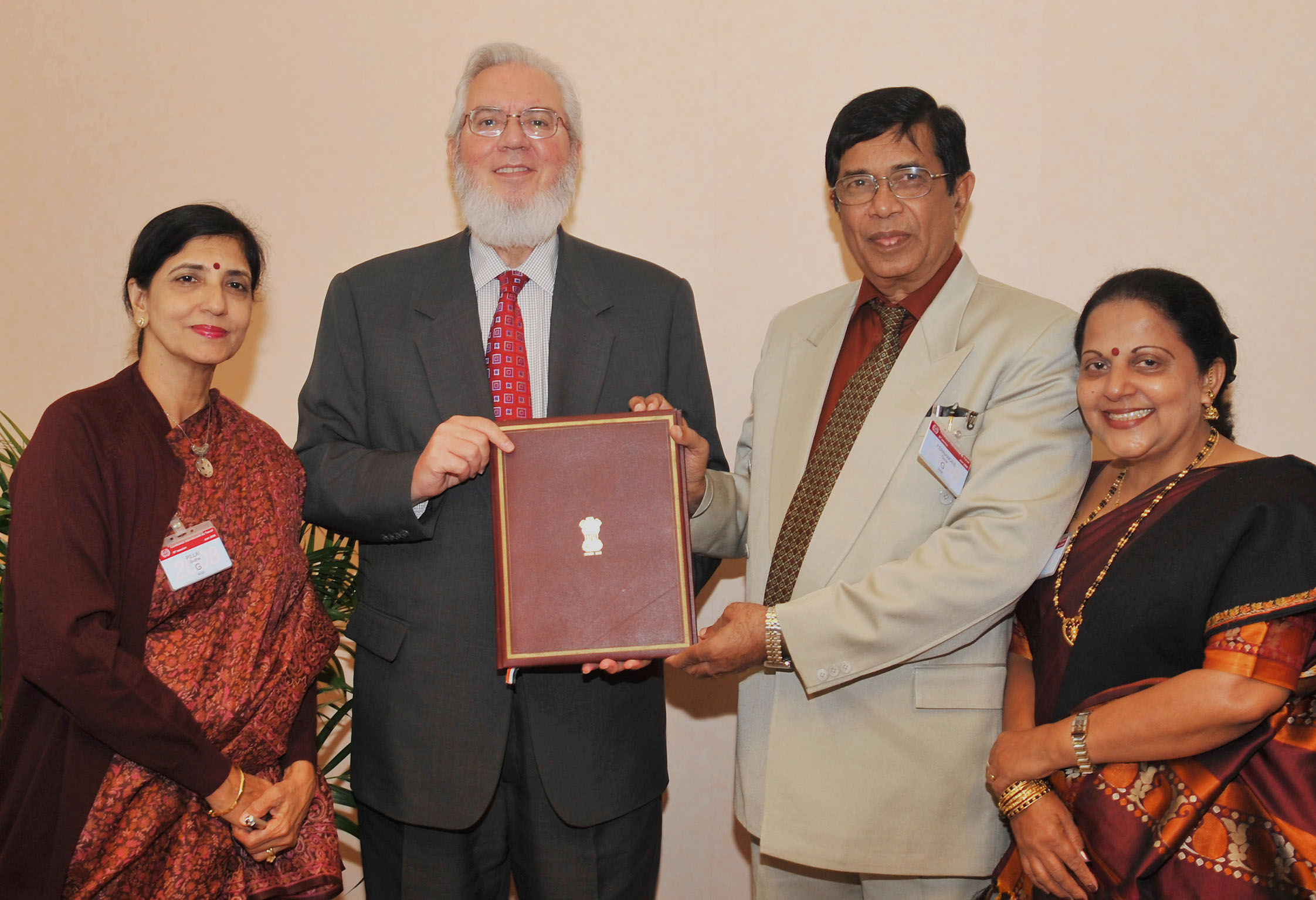
Oscar Fernandes presented the instrument of Ratification for Convention 174 on the Prevention of Major Industrial Accidents Convention, 1993 to the ILO Director-General, Mr. Juan Somavia

As of 2022, the convention has been ratified by 19 states.

Country	Date	Status
Albania	03 Mar 2003	In Force
Armenia	03 Jan 1996	In Force
Belgium	09 Jun 2004	In Force
Bosnia and Herzegovina	18 Jan 2010	In Force
Brazil	02 Aug 2001	In Force
Colombia	09 Dec 1997	In Force
Estonia	13 Sep 2000	In Force
Finland	28 Feb 2013	In Force
India	06 Jun 2008	In Force
Lebanon	04 Apr 2005	In Force
Luxembourg	08 Apr 2008	In Force
Netherlands	25 Mar 1997	In Force
Russian Federation	10 Feb 2012	In Force
Saudi Arabia	08 Oct 2001	In Force
Slovenia	01 Mar 2010	In Force
Sweden	21 Dec 1994	In Force
Switzerland	25 Apr 2022	In Force
Ukraine	15 Jun 2011	In Force
Zimbabwe	09 Apr 2003	In Force
