= Night Work Conventions =

International Labour Organization conventions

C4, C6, C20, C41, C79, C89, C171
- Signed: 1919, 1925, 1934, 1946, 1948, 1990
- Effective: 1921-1995
- Condition: 2 ratifications
- Depositary: Director-General of the International Labour Office
- Languages: French and English

Night Work Conventions are International Labour Organization Convention conventions regulating the rights of night workers. They were specifically aimed at young persons, women or people in specific types of employment (industrial, non-industrial or bakeries) and conceived between 1919 and 1948. A more general instrument (not addressing young people however) was signed in 1990.

== Ratifications ==
An overview of ILO conventions and ratifications is shown below:

ILO code	Field	conclusion date	entry into force	closure for signature	Parties (May 2011)	Denunciations (May 2011)	revising convention(s)	text and ratifications
C4	Women	28 November 1919	13 June 1921	N.A.	27	31	C41, C89	Text, ratifications
C6	Young persons in industry	28 November 1919	13 June 1921	N.A.	50	9	C90	Text, ratifications
C20	Bakeries	8 June 1925	26 May 1928	N.A.	9	8		Text, ratifications
C41	women (revised)	19 June 1934	22 November 1936	27 February 1951	15	23	C89	Text, ratifications
C79	young persons (non-industrial)	29 October 1946	29 December 1950		20	0		Text, ratifications
C89	women (revised)	9 July 1948	27 February 1951		46	21		Text, ratifications
C90	young persons (industrial) (revised)	10 July 1948	12 June 1951		51	0		Text, ratifications
C171	general	26 June 1990	4 January 1995		15	0		Text, ratifications

== See also ==
- Right to sit
- Protective laws
