= Maritime Labour Convention =

International Labour Organization Convention

MLC, C186
Maritime Labour Convention
- Ratifications of the Maritime Labour Convention Parties Ratification, convention not yet in force
- Drafted: 7 February 2006
- Signed: 23 February 2006
- Location: Geneva
- Effective: 20 August 2013
- Condition: 30 ratifications; representing 33% of gross tonnage of ships
- Parties: 112
- Depositary: Director-General of the International Labour Organization
- Languages: French and English

Full text
- Maritime Labour Convention at Wikisource

The Maritime Labour Convention (MLC) is an International Labour Organization (ILO) convention, number 186, established in 2006 as the fourth pillar of international maritime law and embodies "all up-to-date standards of existing international maritime labour Conventions and Recommendations, as well as the fundamental principles to be found in other international labour Conventions". The other pillars are the SOLAS, STCW and MARPOL. The treaties applies to all ships entering the harbours of parties to the treaty (port states), as well as to all ships flying the flag of state party (flag states, as of 2026: over 97 per cent by world gross shipping tonnage).

Maritime Labour Convention (MLC), according to International Labour Organization, provides a broad perspective to the seafarer's rights and fortification at work.

The convention entered into force on 20 August 2013, one year after registering 30 ratifications of countries representing over 33 per cent of the world gross tonnage of ships. Already after five ratifications the ratifying countries (Bahamas, Norway, Liberia, Marshall Islands, and Panama) represented over 43 per cent of the gross world tonnage (which is over 33 per cent; the second requirement for entry into force). As of August 2021, the convention has been ratified by 97 states representing over 97 per cent of global shipping.

Although the convention has not been ratified worldwide, it has widespread effect because vessels from non-signatory states that attempt to enter ports of signatory states may face arrest and penalties for non-compliance with the MLC.

== Content and organization ==
The convention consists of the sixteen articles containing general provisions as well as the Code. The Code consists of five Titles in which specific provisions are grouped by standard (or in Title 5: mode of enforcement):

- Title 1: Minimum requirements for seafarers to work on a ship
- Title 2: Conditions of employment
- Title 3: Accommodation, recreational facilities, food and catering
- Title 4: Health protection, medical care, welfare and social security protection
- Title 5: Compliance and enforcement

For Each Title, there are general Regulations, which are further specified in mandatory Standards (list A) as well as Guidelines (List B). Guidelines generally form a form of implementation of a Regulation according to the requirements, but States are free to have different implementation measures. Regulations and Standards should in principle be implemented fully, but a country can implement a "substantially equivalent" regulation, which it should declare upon ratification.

Some seafarers criticize the convention, saying that it lacks teeth, does not address real issues, and skirts important seafarer needs such as decent sized cabins, cupboards in cabins, shore leave, and rest hours by including them into Guidelines (List B) of the convention—or worse, by not addressing them at all.

=== Title 1: Minimum requirements for seafarers to work on a ship ===
The minimum requirements set out in this section of the code are divided in 4 parts and are summarized below:

- Minimum age requirements: the minimum age is 16 years (18 for night work and work in hazardous areas).
- Medical fitness: workers should be medically fit for the duties they are performing. Countries should issue medical certificates as defined in the STCW (or use a similar standard).
- Training: Seafarers should be trained for their duties as well as have had a personal safety training.
- Recruitment/placement services located in member states or for ships flying the flag of member states should have (among others) proper placement procedures, registration, complaint procedures and compensation if the recruitment fails.

=== Title 2: Employment conditions ===
The Title on employment conditions lists conditions of the contract and payments, as well as the working conditions on ships.

- Contracts: the contract should be clear, legally enforceable and incorporate collective bargaining agreements (if existent).
- Payments: Wages should be paid at least every month, and should be transferable regularly to family if so desired.
- Rest hours: rest hours should be implemented in national legislation. The maximum hours of work in that legislation should not exceed 14 hours in any 24-hour period and 72 hours in any seven-day period, or: at least ten hours of rest in any 24-hour period and 77 hours (rest) in any seven-day period. Furthermore, the daily hours of rest may not be divided into more than two periods and, at least six hours of rest should be given consecutively in one of those two periods.
- Leave: Seafarers have a right to annual leave as well as shore leave.
- Repatriation: Returning to their country of residence should be free.
- Loss: If a ship is lost or foundered, the seafarers have a right to an unemployment payments.
- Manning: Every ship should have a sufficient manning level.
- Development and opportunities: Every seafarer has a right to be promoted during his career except in cases where there is a violation of a statute or code of conduct, which inevitably hinders such promotion. Also, skill development and employment opportunities should be made available for each and every seafarer.

=== Title 3: Accommodation, recreational facilities, food and catering ===
The title specifies rules detailed rules for accommodation and recreational facilities, as well as food and catering.

- Accommodation: Accommodation for living and/or working should be "promoting the seafarers' health and well-being". Detailed provisions (in rules and guidelines) give minimum requirements for various types of rooms (mess rooms, recreational rooms, dorms etc.).
- Food and catering: Both food quality and quantity, including water should be regulated in the flag state. Furthermore, cooks should have proper training.

=== Title 4: Health protection, medical care, welfare and social security Protection ===
Title 4 consists of 5 regulations about health, liability, medical care, welfare and social security.

- Medical care on board ship and ashore: Seafarers should be covered for and have access to medical care while on board; in principle at no cost and of a quality comparable to the standards of health care on shore. Countries through which territory a ship is passing should guarantee treatment on shore in serious cases.
- Shipowners' liability: Seafarers should be protected from the financial effects of "sickness, injury or death occurring in connection with their employment". This includes at least 16 weeks of payment of wages after start of sickness.
- Health and safety protection and accident prevention: A safe and hygienic environment should be provided to seafarers both during working and resting hours and measures should be taken to take reasonable safety measures.
- Access to shore-based welfare facilities: Port states should provide "welfare, cultural, recreational and information facilities and services" and to provide easy access to these services. The access to these facilities should be open to all seafarers irrespective of race, sex, religion or political opinion.
- Social security: Social security coverage should be available to seafarers (and in case it is customary in the flag state: their relatives).

=== Title 5: Compliance and enforcement ===
Title 5 sets standards to ensure compliance with the convention. The title distinguishes requirements for flag state and port state control.

- Flag states: Flag states (the state under which flag the ship operates) are responsible for ensuring implementation of the rules on the ships that fly its flag. Detailed inspections result in the issue of a "Certificate of Maritime Compliance", which should always be present (and valid) on a ship. Ships are required to have decent complaints procedures in place for its crew and should institute investigations in case of casualties.
- Port states: The inspection in ports depends on whether a Certificate of Maritime Compliance is present (and thus a flag is flown of a country which has ratified the convention). If the Certificate is present, compliance is to be assumed in principle, and further investigations only take place if the certificate is not in order or there are indications of non-compliance. For ships that do not have the certificate, inspections are much more detailed and should ensure, according to a "no more favorable treatment principle", that the ship has complied with the provisions of the convention. The convention is thus indirectly also valid for ships of non-member countries if they plan to call to ports of a member state.
- Labour agencies: Agencies supplying on maritime workers to ships should also be inspected to ensure that they apply the convention (among others the regulations regarding to social security).

== Negotiations ==
After tripartite negotiations had started in 2001, the convention was adopted during the 94th International Labour Convention in 2006. The convention received 314 votes in favour and none against by representatives of the government, employers and workers, who each held a single vote per country.

== Ratifications ==
Parties (cumulative by year) Blue: Ratifications Green: Parties (Convention in force)

As of February 2026, the treaty has been ratified by 111 countries, many of which are large flag states in terms of the tonnage they transport. The European Union advised its (then) 27 members to ratify the treaty by 31 December 2010. The EU Decision provides: "Member States are hereby authorised to ratify, for the parts falling under Community competence, the Maritime Labour Convention, 2006, of the International Labour Organization, adopted on 7 February 2006. Member States should make efforts to take the necessary steps to deposit their instruments of ratification of the Convention with the Director-General of the International Labour Office as soon as possible, preferably before 31 December 2010." As of January 2021, 23 countries had done so, while Croatia did so before it entered the European Union. The convention entered into force on 20 August 2013 for the 30 countries that ratified it prior to 20 August 2013. For other countries, the convention enters into force one year after registration of their instrument of ratification. Nearly 1.2 million seafarers are affected by human rights laws, which include regulations on workplace protection, living conditions, employment, health and social security.

Country	Ratification	Entry into force	Notes	% of world gross tonnage
Albania	28 October 2016	28 October 2017		<0.3
Algeria	22 July 2016	22 July 2017		<0.3
Antigua and Barbuda	11 August 2011	20 August 2013		0.3
Argentina	28 May 2014	28 May 2015		<0.3
Australia	21 December 2011	20 August 2013		<0.3
Bahamas	11 February 2008	20 August 2013		5.0
Bangladesh	6 November 2014	6 November 2015		<0.3
Barbados	20 June 2013	20 June 2014		<0.3
Belize	8 July 2014	8 July 2015		<0.3
Belgium	20 August 2013	20 August 2014		0.4
Benin	13 June 2011	20 August 2013		<0.3
Bosnia and Herzegovina	18 January 2010	20 August 2013		<0.3
Bulgaria	12 April 2010	20 August 2013		<0.3
Brazil	7 May 2020	7 May 2021		<0.3
Canada	15 June 2010	20 August 2013		<0.3
Cape Verde	6 October 2015	6 October 2016		<0.3
Chile	22 February 2018	22 February 2019		<0.3
Republic of the Congo	7 April 2014	7 April 2015		<0.3
China	12 November 2015	12 November 2016	including Hong Kong (since 20 August 2018)	14.6
Comoros	18 February 2024	18 February 2025		<0.3
Cook Islands	18 December 2019	18 December 2020		<0.3
Croatia	12 February 2010	20 August 2013		<0.3
Cyprus	20 July 2012	20 August 2013		1.6
Denmark	23 June 2011	20 August 2013	including Faroe Islands (since 9 July 2014) excluding Greenland	1.2 (Danish International Ship Register)
Djibouti	20 July 2018	20 July 2019		<0.3
Ecuador	4 April 2025	4 April 2026		<0.3
Egypt	7 June 2024	7 June 2025		<0.3
Ethiopia	28 March 2019	28 March 2020		<0.3
Fiji	10 October 2014	10 October 2015		<0.3
Finland	9 January 2013	9 January 2014		<0.3
France	28 February 2013	28 February 2014	Including New Caledonia	<0.4
Gabon	25 September 2014	25 September 2015		<0.3
Gambia	29 November 2018	29 November 2019		<0.3
Georgia	14 February 2024	14 February 2025		<0.3
Germany	16 August 2013	16 August 2014		0.4
Ghana	16 August 2013	16 August 2014		<0.3
Greece	4 January 2013	4 January 2014		3.0
Grenada	12 November 2018	12 November 2019		<0.3
Guinea-Bissau	10 June 2024	10 June 2025		<0.3
Hungary	31 July 2013	31 July 2014		<0.3
Iceland	4 April 2019	4 April 2020		<0.3
India	9 October 2015	9 October 2016		0.8
Indonesia	12 June 2017	12 June 2018		1.3
Iran	11 June 2014	11 June 2015		1.0
Iraq	22 March 2023	22 March 2024		<0.3
Ireland	21 July 2014	21 July 2015		<0.3
Italy	19 November 2013	19 November 2014		0.5
Jamaica	13 June 2017	13 June 2018		<0.3
Japan	5 August 2013	5 August 2014		1.8
Jordan	27 April 2016	27 April 2017		<0.3
Kenya	31 July 2014	31 July 2015		<0.3
South Korea	9 January 2014	9 January 2015		0.7
Kiribati	24 October 2011	20 August 2013		<0.3
Latvia	12 August 2011	20 August 2013		<0.3
Lebanon	18 February 2013	9 March 2019		<0.3
Liberia	7 June 2006	20 August 2013		14.1
Lithuania	20 August 2013	20 August 2014		<0.3
Luxembourg	19 September 2011	20 August 2013		<0.3
Madagascar	15 June 2023	15 June 2024		<0.3
Malaysia	20 August 2013	20 August 2014		0.5
Maldives	7 October 2014	7 October 2015		<0.3
Malta	21 January 2013	21 January 2014		5.5
Marshall Islands	25 September 2007	20 August 2013		12.8
Mauritius	30 May 2014	30 May 2015		<0.3
Mongolia	1 September 2015	1 September 2016		<0.3
Montenegro	3 February 2015	3 February 2016		<0.3
Morocco	10 September 2012	10 September 2013		<0.3
Mozambique	25 May 2021	25 May 2022		<0.3
Myanmar	25 May 2016	25 May 2017		<0.3
Netherlands	13 December 2011	20 August 2013	only the European part of the Kingdom and (since 14 April 2015) Curaçao	0.3
New Zealand	9 March 2016	9 March 2017		<0.3
Nicaragua	20 December 2013	20 December 2014		<0.3
Nigeria	18 June 2013	18 June 2014		<0.3
Norway	10 February 2009	20 August 2013		1.0 (Norwegian International Ship Register)
Oman	29 March 2022	29 March 2023		<0.3
Pakistan	14 March 2025	14 March 2026		<0.3
Palau	29 May 2012	20 August 2013		<0.3
Panama	6 February 2009	20 August 2013		16.1
Philippines	20 August 2012	20 August 2013		0.3
Poland	3 May 2012	20 August 2013		<0.3
Romania	24 November 2015	24 November 2016		<0.3
Russia	20 August 2012	20 August 2013		0.5
Saint Kitts and Nevis	21 February 2012	20 August 2013		<0.3
Saint Vincent and the Grenadines	9 November 2010	20 August 2013		<0.3
Samoa	21 November 2013	21 November 2014		<0.3
San Marino	30 March 2022	30 March 2023		<0.3
Serbia	15 March 2013	15 March 2014		<0.3
Seychelles	7 January 2014	7 January 2015		<0.3
Senegal	19 September 2019	19 September 2020		<0.3
Sierra Leone	29 March 2022	29 March 2023		<0.3
Singapore	15 June 2011	20 August 2013		6.4
Slovakia	17 May 2018	17 May 2019		<0.3
Slovenia	15 April 2016	15 April 2017		<0.3
Solomon Islands	8 January 2026	8 January 2027		<0.3
South Africa	20 June 2013	20 June 2014		<0.3
Spain	4 February 2010	20 August 2013	flag register of Madeira	1.1
Sri Lanka	12 January 2017	12 January 2018		<0.3
Sudan	4 October 2019	4 October 2020		<0.3
Sweden	12 June 2012	20 August 2013		<0.3
Switzerland	21 February 2011	20 August 2013		<0.3
Syria	6 April 2023	6 April 2024		<0.3
Tanzania	3 April 2019	3 April 2020		<0.3
Thailand	6 June 2016	6 June 2017		<0.3
Togo	14 March 2012	20 August 2013		<0.3
Tunisia	5 April 2017	5 April 2018		<0.3
Tuvalu	16 February 2012	20 August 2013		<0.3
United Kingdom	7 August 2013	7 August 2014	extended to Bermuda, British Virgin Islands, Cayman Islands, Isle of Man, Gibraltar, Falkland Islands	2.3
Vietnam	8 May 2013	8 May 2014		0.5
	Ratifications: 111	In force: 108		Total: 96.6%

== Effect on other conventions ==
The convention changed the status of 37 ILO conventions, which meant that these conventions upon entry into force of this convention closed for ratification (if not already) and that entry into force for a specific country meant automatic denouncement the other conventions (if not already).

- Minimum Age (Sea) Convention, 1920
- Unemployment Indemnity (Shipwreck) Convention, 1920
- Placing of Seamen Convention, 1920
- Medical Examination of Young Persons (Sea) Convention, 1921
- Seamen's Articles of Agreement Convention, 1926
- Repatriation of Seamen Convention, 1926
- Officers' Competency Certificates Convention, 1936
- Holidays with Pay (Sea) Convention, 1936
- Shipowners' Liability (Sick and Injured Seamen) Convention, 1936
- Sickness Insurance (Sea) Convention, 1936
- Hours of Work and Manning (Sea) Convention, 1936
- Minimum Age (Sea) Convention (Revised), 1936
- Food and Catering (Ships' Crews) Convention, 1946
- Certification of Ships' Cooks Convention, 1946
- Social Security (Seafarers) Convention, 1946
- Paid Vacations (Seafarers) Convention, 1946
- Medical Examination (Seafarers) Convention, 1946
- Certification of Able Seamen Convention, 1946
- Accommodation of Crews Convention, 1946
- Wages, Hours of Work and Manning (Sea) Convention, 1946
- Paid Vacations (Seafarers) Convention (Revised), 1949
- Accommodation of Crews Convention (Revised), 1949
- Wages, Hours of Work and Manning (Sea) Convention (Revised), 1949
- Wages, Hours of Work and Manning (Sea) Convention (Revised), 1958
- Accommodation of Crews (Supplementary Provisions) Convention, 1970
- Prevention of Accidents (Seafarers) Convention, 1970
- Continuity of Employment (Seafarers) Convention, 1976
- Seafarers' Annual Leave with Pay Convention, 1976
- Merchant Shipping (Minimum Standards) Convention, 1976 (and 1996 protocol)
- Seafarers' Welfare Convention, 1987
- Health Protection and Medical Care (Seafarers) Convention, 1987
- Social Security (Seafarers) Convention (Revised), 1987
- Repatriation of Seafarers Convention (Revised), 1987
- Labour Inspection (Seafarers) Convention, 1996
- Recruitment and Placement of Seafarers Convention, 1996
- Seafarers' Hours of Work and the Manning of Ships Convention, 1996

== Criticism ==
While the authors of MLC 2006 called it the fourth pillar of maritime policy, many seafarers themselves and industry bodies saw it as a rather weak convention which did not materially change life at sea. From this perspective, the more important parts of the convention have been placed in the non-mandatory section "B"; other issues, such as air conditioning or interpretations of what could be termed as good nutritious food, are not addressed by the convention. Some seafarers have complained that the convention does not carry any stipulations to make the crew cabins on cargo ships any bigger than they currently are and does not increase the number of cupboards or shelves, which are typically minimal on cargo ships. The convention also does not address the issues of rest hours during work or rest when joining ship; these issues are determined by crew and companies alone.

== Maritime labour issues and Coronavirus (COVID-19) ==
According to the provisions of the 2006 Maritime Labour Convention, the International Labour Organization (ILO) appealed to governments to ensure that seafarers are repatriated and that the risk of COVID-19 virus infection is minimised.

The ILO memorandum aimed to create synergies between the action strategies of the International Maritime Organization (IMO) and the World Health Organization (WHO) to prevent the spread of COVID-19. Both the International Chamber of Shipping and the International Transport Workers' Federation has been active in supporting seafarers and ship-owners and advise on their membership. The International Chamber of Shipping published the 'Coronavirus (COVID-19) Guidance for Ship Operators for the Protection of the Health of Seafarers' and the International Transport Workers' Federation published the information material 'COVID-19 advice to ships and seafarers.'

After the initial 'force majeure' caused by sudden and indiscriminate border closures, crew change remained a significant issue throughout the pandemic. Christiaan De Beukelaer argues in the journal Marine Policy that the continued crew change crisis risks eroding the Maritime Labour Convention.
