= International Business Centre of Madeira =

Set of tax benefits for the Autonomous Region of Madeira

Decree-Law n. 500/80

Government of Portugal
- Long title: Authorizes the creation of a free zone in the Autonomous Region of Madeira
- Citation: 1980, c. 3493
- Territorial extent: Autonomous Region of Madeira
- Enacted: 13 Augusto 1980
- Assented to: 11 October 1980
- Signed by: António Ramalho Eanes
- Commenced: 21 October 1980
- Administered by: European Commission; Ministry of Finance; Regional Government of Madeira; Portuguese Tax and Customs Authority; SDM - Sociedade de Desenvolvimento da Madeira, S.A.

Amends
- Implementing Decree n. 53/82; Decree-Law n. 165/86; Regional Implementing Decree n. 21/87/M; Decree-Law n. 352-A/88; Decree-Law n. 234/88; Decree-Law n. 96/89; Ministral Order n. 715/89; Ministral Order n. 134/92; Decree-Law n. 215/89; Ministral Order n. 135/94; Decree-Law n. 149/94; Decree-Law 212/94; Decree-Law n. 250/97; Ministral Order n. 222/99; Decree-Law n. 192/2003; Ministral Order n. 4/2010; Law n. 54-B/2011; Law n. 20/2012; Law n. 83/2013; Law n. 83-C/2013; Law n. 75-A/2014; Law n. 64/2015; Law n. 21/2021

Related legislation
- Corporate Income Tax Code; Municipal Property Tax Code; Municipal Property Transfer Tax Code; Stamp Duty Tax Code; Tax Benefits Statutes

Summary
- Regulates the Madeira Free Trade Zone Tax Regime.

Keywords
- State Aid
- Status: In force

The International Business Center of Madeira (IBCM) or Madeira International Business Centre (MIBC), formally known as the Madeira Free Trade Zone, is a set of tax benefits authorised by Decree-Law 500/80 in 1980, legislated in 1986, and amended throughout the years by the Portuguese government to favor the Autonomous Region of Madeira. Its objectives are to attract foreign investment to the region and internationalise Portuguese companies by allowing them to benefit one of the lowest corporate taxation rates in Europe and in the OECD member countries.

Since 1987, the MIBC has been managed and promoted by a private company, Sociedade de Desenvolvimento da Madeira S.A. (SDM), in which the Regional Government of Madeira currently holds of 48,86% the shares. The other main shareholder is Pestana Group, holding 51,14% of the shares. As of January 2020, the Vice-Presidency of the Madeira Regional Government announced its intention of acquiring 51% of the shares of SDM.

The International Shipping Registry of Madeira (locally known as MAR or RIN-MAR), created by the Portuguese government to develop its blue economy, is associated strongly with the MIBC. As one of Europe's largest ship and yacht registries, MAR accepts the registration of all types of commercial vehicles. In 2016, MAR had a total of 516 registered vessels. The registry offers benefits to shipping companies and ships, oil rigs and yachts, including a mortgage system and access to European continental and island cabotage.

== European Union approval ==
The MIBC was created the year that Portugal became a member state of the European Union. The tax benefits approved for Madeira would be considered state aid under EU law, and subject to approval by the European Commission.

Approval of such tax benefits by the European Commission is covered by Article 349 of the Treaty on the Functioning of the European Union, which states that specific measures are to be implemented in the EU's outermost regions to offset structural, social and economic situations compounded by "remoteness, insularity, small size, difficult topography and climate, economic dependence on a few products, the permanence and combination of which severely restrain their development". Among the measures foreseen in the treaty is the creation of free-trade zones.

The MIBC is regulated and supervised by Portuguese (the Regional Government of Madeira, the Portuguese Tax and Customs Authority, and the Portuguese Social Security System) and EU authorities (primarily the Directorate-General for Competition). Through the MIBC, Madeira became the only jurisdiction in Portugal to allow the incorporation of trusts (a common law fiduciary relationship which is non-existent in Portuguese law). In a Madeiran trust, the settlor designates the law regulating the trust.

== Tax benefits ==
Since the 1980s, MIBC tax benefits have evolved. Their core principle is the reduction of the corporate tax rates in the Portuguese tax code.

Under the current set of tax benefits applicable to the MIBC tax benefits, the applicable corporate income tax rate—known in Portugal as IRC—for licensed companies is 5% of taxable income. However, if the company conducts business activities with other Portuguese companies which are not licensed to operate in the MIBC, the tax rate on profits is the normal 20%.

Since companies licensed in the MIBC are Portuguese companies for all legal purposes, they may qualify (under certain conditions) for the Portuguese-European participation exemption regime applicable to dividends and capital gains.

Main Tax Benefits	Tax Rate	Conditions
Corporate Tax Rate	5%	Applicable to profits derived from operations exclusively carried out with non-resident entities or with other companies operating within the MIBC.
Withholding Tax on Dividend Remittances	0%	Only applicable to non-resident single and corporate shareholders of MIBC companies and provided that they are not resident in blacklisted jurisdictions.
Capital gains payments to Shareholders	0%	Only applicable to those who are not residents in black listed jurisdictions.
Payments of interest	0%	N/A
Payments of royalties	0%	N/A
Payments of services	0%	N/A
Stamp Duty	80% exemption	Documents, contracts and other operations requiring public registration carried out by MIBC companies provided that other parties involved are not resident in Portuguese territory or companies operating within the legal framework of the MIBC.
Municipal property tax and property transfer tax, regional and municipal surtax as well as any other local taxes	80% exemption	N/A

=== Trusts ===
Apart from the unique rules applicable to trust within the MIBC, trusts are fully exempt from taxation on dividends received from shares, royalties or interest received on the deposits and all (non-financial) income distributed from the trustee to the trust's beneficiaries is fully exempt of taxation provided these beneficiaries are corporate entities licensed to operate within the MIBC or non-Portuguese resident entities/individuals.

=== Substance Requirements ===
The above-mentioned tax benefits, namely the reduced corporate tax rates, are only granted if the following substance requirements are met:

Number of employees required to be hired	Minimum investment	Taxable profit plafond
1–2	€75,000	€2,730,000
3–5	€75,000	€3,550,000
6–30	-	€21,870,000
31–50	-	€35,540,000
51–100	-	€54,680,000
Over 100	-	€205,500,000

Although the European Commission does not state anywhere in its regime approval, local stakeholders are of the understanding that the employees to be hire need to be on a full-time basis and resident, for tax purposes, on the Autonomous Region of Madeira.

The minimum investment, in tangible or intangible assets, of €75,000 must occur, within two years after incorporation, if the licensed company is to hire less than six employees.

==== Criticism ====
Although labor costs in Madeira are among the lowest in the Western Europe, the minimum regional wage being €850 (in 2024), the requirement concerning the need to create job posts has also been harshly criticized by stakeholders, namely the concessionary Sociededade de Desenvolvimento da Madeira who reported a mass exodus of companies to competitor jurisdictions, such Luxembourg and Malta, after the job creation was implemented and having it depend on the companies' taxable profit. Furthermore, the number employees per company was higher, before the employment requirement was established, since companies would hire on a need basis and not in accordance with law dictates.

=== Limits to the tax benefits ===
Licensed companies, operating within the MIBC framework are subject to one of the following annual maximum limits applicable to the tax benefits provided for in this regime:

- 20,1% of the gross added value obtained annually, or
- 30,1% of annual labor costs incurred, or
- 15,1% of annual turnover.

This means that the difference between the normal tax corporate rate in the Autonomous Region of Madeira and the 5% corporate tax rate on the taxable profit, granted to the companies, cannot exceed one of the amounts above mentioned.

== Activities ==
The Portuguese Tax Benefits Statutes contain a list of economic activities which can benefit from tax benefits applicable to licensed companies in the MIBC:

Economic Activity	Statiscial Classification	MIBC license
Manufacturing	Section D	Yes
Production and distribution of electricity, gas and water	Section E, divisions 36, 37, 38 and 39	Yes
General commercial activities	Section G, divisions 45 and 46	Yes
Transportation and communications	Section H, divisions 49, 50, 51, 52 and 53; Section N, division 79; Section J, code 61	Yes
Real estate activities and services rendered to companies	Section N, divisions 68 and 77; Section J, divisions 58, 59, 60, 62 and 63; Section C, division 33; Section S, division 95; Section M, divisions 69, 70, 71, 72, 73 and 74; Section N, division 77, group 77.4; Section N, divisions 78, 80, 81 and 82; Section P, division 85, group 85.6, class 8560; Section K, division 64, group 64.2, class 64.20	Yes
Teaching and other educational activities	Section P, division 85, group 85.3, class 85.32; Section P, division 85, groups 85.4, 85.5 and 85.6	Yes
Other services rendered to companies in general	Section E, division 37; Section J, divisions 59, 60 and 63; Section R, divisions 90, 91, 92 and 93; Section P, division 85, group 85.5, class 85.51; Section N, divisions 78 and 79; Section S, division 96; Section R, division 91, class 91.04; Section J, division 94, group 94.9, class 94.99.	Yes
Entities carrying out intra-group activities and whose main activity is included in subdivisions 70.10 "Activities of head-offices" or 70.22 "Business and other management consultancy activities" of section, and entities whose main activity is included in section K "Financial and insurance activities"		No
Entities which carry out activities in the steel and synthetic fibre sectors, as defined in points 43 and 44 of article 2nd of the Commission Regulation (EU) nº 651/2014 of 17 June 2014 and in the sectors of coal and naval construction, in the terms of paragraph a) of article 13 of the same regulation		No
Entities carrying out activities in the sectors of agriculture, forestry, fishing, aquiculture and mining in the terms of subparagraphs i) and ii) of paragraph c) of article 13 of the Commission Regulation (EU) nº 651/2014 of 17 June 2014		No
Entities considered as "undertaking in difficulty" according to the terms laid out in point 18 of article 2 of the Commission Regulation (EU) nº 651/2014 of 17 June 2014		No
Entities subject to a pending recovering injunction following a European Commission decision which declares a specific aid as illegal and non-compatible with the internal market		No

== International Shipping Register of Madeira ==
Linked to the MIBC is the International Shipping Register of Madeira (MAR) which offers specific operational advantages, apart from the MIBC tax benefits which are applicable to both vessels (excluding fishing vessels), yachts, shipping and yachting companies incorporated in MIBC.

=== Specific benefits ===
==== Crew related benefits ====
Under the MIBC rules shipping companies with vessels registered in MAR and their respective non-Portuguese crew are exempt from contributing to the Portuguese social security, under the condition that some form of private insurance is guaranteed. Alternatively, crew members may opt for the Portuguese voluntary social security regime or any other type of protection scheme. In addition to the social security benefits, crew of commercial vessels and yachts registered in MAR are also exempt from personal income tax.

In the case of yachts there are no citizenship requirements imposed on the crew. However present regulations stipulate that 30% of the safe manning of all other types of vessels must be European, either EU and non-EU Member-States, or citizens of Portuguese-speaking countries. This requirement applicable to vessels can only be eliminated whenever if duly justified.

==== Yacht companies ====
Yacht owning companies duly registered in the MIBC have access of a discount of 20% on registration and annual fees due to MAR, apart from all the other MIBC benefits applicable to duly lincensed companies.

===== VAT exemption on yacht acquisitions =====
Provided that the importation occurs outside of Portugal, although made by a Portuguese company, there will be not Portuguese VAT liability as the yacht will not enter into Portuguese waters and shall not, assuredly, be subject to custom clearance in Portuguese territory. Nevertheless, the Portuguese tax authorities can, nevertheless, request an evidence of the VAT payment overseas in case of inspection.

On the other hand, should the acquisition of the yacht be made through a Portuguese company (either duly licensed in the MIBC or not) and the vessel be accounted as part of its fixed movable assets, the Regime of Intra-Community Supply of Goods should apply. In this case the Madeira Company should use the VAT reverse charge mechanism (it makes the declaration of both its purchase (input VAT) and the supplier's sale (output VAT) in its VAT return. In this way, the two entries cancel each other from a cash payment perspective in the same return).

==== Mortgage law ====
A flexible mortgage system applies to vessels register under MAR, allowing the mortgagor and the mortgagee to choose, through written agreement, and the legal system of a particular country that shall govern the terms of the mortgage. Only in case of lack of an agreement shall the Portuguese mortgage law be applicable to vessel registered.

Surveys

Surveys of yachts registered within MAR can be delegated on classification societies, or on other recognized entities duly approved by the Portuguese Government. Under current register's rules only eight classification societies are recognized as competent to conduct surveys within MAR: American Bureau of Shipping, Bureau Veritas, Det Norske Veritas, Lloyd's Register, Registro Italiano Navale, Rinave Portuguesa, Germanischer Lloyd and ClassNK.

=== International Conventions ===
Given the fact that Madeira is an integral part of Portugal and the EU, all international conventions, either by IMO or ILO, ratified by Portugal are fully applicable to and binding to MAR.

United Nations specialized agency	Conventions
International Maritime Organization	IMO Convention, 1948
International Maritime Organization	SOLAS Convention, 1974
International Maritime Organization	LOAD LINES Convention, 1966
International Maritime Organization	TONNAGE Convention, 1969
International Maritime Organization	COLREG Convention, 1972
International Maritime Organization	CSC Convention, 1972
International Maritime Organization	STCW Convention,1978
International Maritime Organization	INMARSAT Convention, 1976
International Maritime Organization	FACILITATION Convention, 1965
International Maritime Organization	MARPOL 73/78 (Annex I/II; Annex III; Annex IV; Annex V) Protocol 97 (Annex VI)
International Maritime Organization	London Convention, 1972
International Maritime Organization	INTERVENTION Convention, 1969
International Maritime Organization	CLC Convention, 1969
International Maritime Organization	FUND Convention, 1971
International Maritime Organization	SUA Convention, 1988
International Maritime Organization	OPRC Convention, 1990
International Maritime Organization	OPRC/HNS, 2000
International Labour Organization	Unemployment Indemnity (Shipwreck) Convention, 1920
International Labour Organization	Seamen's Articles of Agreement Convention, 1926
International Labour Organization	Repatriation of Seamen Convention, 1926
International Labour Organization	Food and Catering (Ships' Crews) Convention, 1946
International Labour Organization	Certification of Ships' Cooks Convention, 1946
International Labour Organization	Medical Examination (Seafarers) Convention, 1946
International Labour Organization	Certification of Able Seamen Convention, 1946
International Labour Organization	Accommodation of Crews Convention (Revised), 1949
International Labour Organization	Seafarers' Identity Documents Convention, 1958
International Labour Organization	Workers' Representatives Convention, 1971
International Labour Organization	Dock Work Convention, 1973
International Labour Organization	Continuity of Employment (Seafarers) Convention, 1976
International Labour Organization	Seafarers' Annual Leave with Pay Convention, 1976
International Labour Organization	Merchant Shipping (Minimum Standards) Convention, 1976
International Labour Organization	MLC 2006

== Economic and revenue impact ==
=== International Business Center of Madeira ===
In 2017, the MIBC represented 20 percent of the total revenue of the Regional Government of Madeira and 50 percent of the total corporate tax revenue of the autonomous region. According to the Vice-President of the Regional Government, Pedro Calado, the revenue is crucial to maintaining the region's fiscal autonomy from the Republic.

As of December 31, 2017 the employment generated by companies licensed within the International Business Centre was the following, by sector:

- 2259 workers were employed within the International Services sector;
- 727 workers were employed within the Industrial Free Trade Zone sector;
- 5349 workers were crew members of vessels registered within the Madeira International Shipping Registry.

In 2018 the MIBC was responsible for generating 13,3% of the total tax revenue of the archipelago and 42,8% of the total corporate tax revenue. Such amount of taxes generated was equivalent to more a less 33,3% of the total expenditure incurred by the Regional Government on the regional healthcare system.

In 2020 the Vice-Presidency of the Regional Government of Madeira, on the presentation of the Regional Budget for 2020, confirmed that Madeira's GDP grew 5,1% in 2019 (way above the national average). In its report to the Legislative Assembly of Madeira the Government informed that such economic growth was due to the substantial GDP generated by the International Business Centre of Madeira.

=== International Shipping Register of Madeira ===
According to reports issued by the OECD and the United Nations the International Shipping Register of Madeira (MAR) ranked, in 2019, top 15 in the world and the top 3 in Europe, just after Malta and Cyprus. As of 30 June 2018 it had 635 vessels registered.

=== Potential tax revenue assessment ===
Economist Miguel Pinto-Correia's thesis argues that the full application of the MIBC regime to the Autonomous Region of Madeira could lead to a significant improvement in its fiscal health, potentially resulting in a budget surplus. He argues that the MIBC regime could attract a substantial influx of international businesses and investments to the region. This, in turn, would increase the regional government's tax revenue and stimulate local economic growth. Pinto-Correia supports his argument with a combination of theoretical frameworks and analysis of the available tax revenue at the time.

=== Portuguese Catholic University impact assessment ===
According to the study published by the Portuguese Catholic University, on April 4, 2019, should all the companies benefiting from the International Business Centre of Madeira cease to operate then:

- Madeira would suffer a loss equivalent to 10,4% of the GVA generated in 2015;
- Between 3600 and 6400 people on the island would lose their job (i.e. between 2,67% and 5,02% of the island's labour force would become unemployed);
- The Regional Government's public debt would increase considerably in order to compensate the above-mentioned negative effects, therefore worsening the government's work in the past year to regularize public spending.

=== Coimbra University impact assessment ===
On April 30, 2022, the media and JPP leaked the conclusions of the study carried out by Coimbra University, on behalf of the Portuguese Government, where it stated that should the International Business Centre of Madeira cease to exist mainland Portuguese taxpayers would be required to subsidized not only the Madeira's Regional Governments coffers but also the island economy due the massive economic recession that end of the tax benefits would bring upon Madeira and Porto Santo.

== Regime III Audit ==
The MIBC has attracted considerable criticism for its low taxation relative to the Portuguese mainland and due to the scandals surrounding companies licensed with it. After the publication of the Panama Papers, the European Parliament inquiry committee on the scandal, and criticism from MEPs such as Ana Gomes and Markus Febber, the European Commission began in 2018 an audit to the MIBC. The audit concerned the job posts created during the so-called Regime III which was enforced between 2007 and 2014, with the tax benefits being applicable until 2020.

=== Response from the Madeiran Stakeholders ===
Following the audit to the regime by the European Commission, the Portuguese Government, the Madeira Regional Government, the Sociedade de Desenvolvimento da Madeira and the Madeiran Chamber of Commerce initiated a campaigned to defend the taxation regime on the island. The said campaign involved requesting, the Portuguese Catholic University, an economic and sustainability study on the importance of the taxation regime the island's economy, as well as filling a formal complaint and legal opinion to the European Commission's preliminary evaluation of the taxation regime.

=== Audit results ===
On December 4, 2020, the European Commission concluded that the III Regime of the MIBC scheme was not implemented in line with approved conditions and that breaching companies would need to give back the tax benefits granted.

Following the Commission's decision the Portuguese Government filled a bill to be discussed and approved by the Assembly of the Republic where it clearly states that tax benefits are to be granted provided that job posts created by the companies benefiting from the low corporate income tax rate are fulfilled by the people who are resident, for tax purposes, in Madeira.

=== Regional stakeholders criticism ===
The audit results from the European Commission was heavily criticized by Madeiran stakeholders, such as the Regional Government, the Madeiran Chamber of Commerce and Sociedade de Desenvolvimento da Madeira, who called the decision to be politically motivated and favouring the low taxation lobbies of certain Member-States who do not face the permanent economic constraints that an outermost region faces.

Pedro Calado, then Vice-President of the Regional Government, has also criticized the Government of the Republic's response to the job post criteria and vowed to present a different bill to the Assembly of the Republic, as he considered that the changes present to the law would close Madeira's economy to the rest world.

== See also ==
- Special economic zone
