= C72 =

C72 may refer to:

- Ruy Lopez chess openings ECO code
- Malignant neoplasm of spinal cord, cranial nerves and other parts of central nervous system ICD-10 code
- Siemens C72, a mobile phone
- Honda C71, C76, C72, C77 Dream, motorcycle different models
- Paid Vacations (Seafarers) Convention, 1946 code
- Caldwell 72 (NGC 55), a barred irregular galaxy in the constellation Sculptor
- GER Class C72, a class of British steam locomotives
