= C56 =

C56 or C-56 may refer to:

- C-56 (Michigan county highway)
- ARM Cadete Juan Escutia (C56), an Admirable-class minesweeper of the Mexican Navy
- Caldwell 56, a planetary nebula
- Hexachlorocyclopentadiene, an organochlorine compound
- JNR Class C56, a class of Japanese steam locomotive
- Lockheed C-56 Lodestar, an American military aircraft
- Ovarian cancer
- Sickness Insurance (Sea) Convention, 1936 of the International Labour Organization
- Two Knights Defense, a chess opening
- Affordable Housing and Groceries Act, Bill C-56
