= C54 =

C54 or C-54 may refer to:

- ARM Cadete Agustín Melgar (C54), an Admirable-class minesweeper of the Mexican Navy
- Caldwell 54, an open cluster in the constellation Monoceros
- Douglas C-54 Skymaster, an American transport aircraft
- Giuoco Piano, a chess opening
- JNR Class C54, a Japanese steam locomotive
- Holidays with Pay (Sea) Convention, 1936 of the International Labour Organization
- Uterine cancer
