= C91 =

C91 may refer to:

- Ruy Lopez chess openings ECO code
- Lymphoid leukemia ICD-10 code
- Brun C91, a 1991 sports prototype racing car built for Group C
- Dowagiac Municipal Airport in Dowagiac, Michigan FAA LID
- Paid Vacations (Seafarers) Convention (Revised), 1949 (shelved) code
- C91FM, a former branding name for Christchurch New Zealand radio C93FM
- Caldwell 91 (NGC 3532), an open cluster in the constellation Carina
