= Hours of Work and Rest Periods (Road Transport) Convention =

Hours of Work and Rest Periods (Road Transport) Convention may refer to:

- Hours of Work and Rest Periods (Road Transport) Convention, 1939, a shelved International Labour Organization convention.
- Hours of Work and Rest Periods (Road Transport) Convention, 1979, the revision of the above convention.
