= C130 =

C130 or C-130 may refer to:

- Lockheed C-130 Hercules, a large aircraft, mainly used to transport cargo
- C130J, an upgraded version of C130
- Bombardier CSeries C130, a 130-seat variant of the Bombardier CSeries aircraft family, later redesignated CS300, now called Airbus A220-300
- Medical Care and Sickness Benefits Convention, 1969 code
