= C92 =

C92 may refer to:

- Ruy Lopez chess openings ECO code
- Myeloid leukemia ICD-10 code
- Accommodation of Crews Convention (Revised), 1949 code
- Honda C92, a motorcycle
- Mentone Airport in Mentone, Indiana FAA LID
- Caldwell 92 (the Carina Nebula, NGC 3372), a bright nebula and star-forming region in the constellation of Carina
