= C57 =

C57 may refer to:

- ARM Cadete Fernando Montes de Oca (C57), an Admirable-class minesweeper of the Mexican Navy
- Caldwell 57, a barred irregular galaxy
- C57BL/6, a common inbred strain of lab mouse
- Fried Liver Attack, a chess opening
- HMS Cumberland (C57), a County-class heavy cruiser of the Royal Navy
- Hours of Work and Manning (Sea) Convention, 1936 of the International
- JNR Class C57, a class of Japanese 4-6-2 "Pacific" type steam locomotive
- Lockheed C-57 Lodestar, an American military aircraft

== See also ==
- C-57D, a fictional spaceship from the movie Forbidden Planet
