= MIBC =

MIBC may refer to:

- Madeira International Business Center, a set of tax benefits available in Madeira, Portugal.
- Moscow International Business Center, the central business district in Moscow, Russia.
- Methyl Isobutyl Carbinol, a reagent used in froth flotation.
- Muscle invasive bladder cancer
