= Seafarers' Pensions Convention, 1946 =

International Labour Organization Convention

C71
- ILO Convention
- Date of adoption: June 28, 1946
- Date in force: November 10, 1962
- Classification: Social Security
- Subject: Seafarers
- Previous: Social Security (Seafarers) Convention, 1946
- Next: Paid Vacations (Seafarers) Convention, 1946

Seafarers' Pensions Convention, 1946 is an International Labour Organization Convention.

It was established in 1946, with the preamble stating:

Having decided upon the adoption of certain proposals with regard to seafarers' pensions,...

== Ratifications ==
As of 2013, the convention has been ratified by 13 states.

Country	Date	Notes
Algeria	November 19, 1962	
Argentina	February 17, 1955	
Bulgaria	December 29, 1949	
Djibouti	August 3, 1978	
Egypt	August 4, 1982	
France	December 9, 1948	
Greece	December 2, 1986	
Italy	April 10, 1962	
Lebanon	December 6, 1993	
Netherlands	August 27, 1957	
Norway	July 4, 1949	
Panama	June 4, 1971	
Peru	April 4, 1962	
