= Social Security (Seafarers) Convention (Revised), 1987 =

International Labour Organization Convention

C165
- ILO Convention
- Date of adoption: October 9, 1987
- Date in force: July 2, 1992
- Classification: Social Security
- Subject: Seafarers
- Previous: Health Protection and Medical Care (Seafarers) Convention, 1987
- Next: Repatriation of Seafarers Convention (Revised), 1987

Social Security (Seafarers) Convention (Revised), 1987 is an International Labour Organization Convention.

It was established in 1987, with the preamble stating:

Having determined that these proposals shall take the form of an international Convention revising the Sickness Insurance (Sea) Convention, 1936, and the Social Security (Seafarers) Convention, 1946,...

== Ratifications ==
The convention had been ratified by three states: Hungary (1989), the Philippines (2004), and Spain (2001). However, all three states have subsequently denounced the treaty.
