= Sickness Insurance (Industry) Convention, 1927 =

International Labour Organization Convention

C24
- ILO Convention
- Date of adoption: June 15, 1927
- Date in force: July 15, 1928
- Classification: Medical Care and Sickness Benefit
- Subject: Social Security
- Previous: Repatriation of Seamen Convention, 1926
- Next: Sickness Insurance (Agriculture) Convention, 1927

Sickness Insurance (Industry) Convention, 1927 is an International Labour Organization Convention.

It was established in 1927:

Having decided upon the adoption of certain proposals with regard to sickness insurance for workers in industry and commerce and domestic servants,...

== Modification ==
The principles contained in the convention were revised and included in ILO Convention C130.

== Ratifications ==
As of 2013, the convention has been ratified by 29 states. One state that has ratified, Uruguay, has subsequently denounced the convention.
