= Inspection of Emigrants Convention, 1926 (shelved) =

International Labour Organization Convention

C21
- ILO Convention
- Date of adoption: June 5, 1926
- Date in force: December 29, 1927
- This Convention has been "shelved".
- Classification: Migrant Workers
- Subject: Migrant Workers
- Previous: Night Work (Bakeries) Convention, 1925 (shelved)
- Next: Seamen's Articles of Agreement Convention, 1926

Inspection of Emigrants Convention, 1926 (shelved) is an International Labour Organization Convention.

It was established in 1926:

Having decided upon the adoption of certain proposals with regard to the simplification of the inspection of emigrants on board ship, ...

== Ratifications ==
Prior to its being shelved, the convention had been ratified by 33 states.
