= Labour Inspection (Agriculture) Convention, 1969 =

International Labour Organization Convention

C129
- ILO Convention
- Date of adoption: June 25, 1969
- Date in force: January 19, 1972
- Classification: Labour Inspection
- Subject: Labour Administration and Inspection
- Previous: Invalidity, Old-Age and Survivors' Benefits Convention, 1967
- Next: Medical Care and Sickness Benefits Convention, 1969

Labour Inspection (Agriculture) Convention, 1969 is an International Labour Organization Convention.

It was established in 1969, with the preamble stating:

Having decided upon the adoption of certain proposals with regard to labour inspection in agriculture,...

== Ratifications ==
As of January 2023, the convention has been ratified by 56 countries.

Country	Date	Status
Albania	11 Oct 2007	In Force
Argentina	20 Jun 1985	In Force
Azerbaijan	09 Aug 2000	In Force
Belgium	08 Sep 1997	In Force
Bolivia	31 Jan 1977	In Force
Bosnia and Herzegovina	02 Jun 1993	In Force
Botswana	22 Dec 2022	Will enter into force on 22 Dec 2023
Burkina Faso	21 May 1974	In Force
Colombia	16 Nov 1976	In Force
Costa Rica	16 Mar 1972	In Force
Croatia	08 Oct 1991	In Force
Czech Republic	16 Mar 2011	In Force
Denmark	30 Nov 1972	In Force
Egypt	20 Jun 2003	In Force
Ivory Coast	05 Jun 1987	In Force
Denmark	30 Nov 1972	In Force
Egypt	20 Jun 2003	In Force
El Salvador	15 Jun 1995	In Force
Estonia	01 Feb 2005	In Force
Fiji	18 Jan 2010	In Force
France	28 Dec 1972	In Force
Germany	26 Sep 1973	In Force
Guatemala	20 May 1994	In Force
Guyana	19 Jan 1971	In Force
Hungary	04 Jan 1994	In Force
Iceland	24 Mar 2009	In Force
Italy	23 Jun 1981	In Force
Kazakhstan	06 Jul 2001	In Force
Kenya	09 Apr 1979	In Force
Latvia	25 Jul 1994	In Force
Luxembourg	08 Apr 2008	In Force
Madagascar	21 Dec 1971	In Force
Malawi	20 Jul 1971	In Force
Malta	09 Jun 1988	In Force
Montenegro	03 Jun 2006	In Force
Morocco	11 May 1979	In Force
Netherlands	29 Jun 1973	In Force
North Macedonia	17 Nov 1991	In Force
Norway	14 Apr 1971	In Force
Panama	22 Mar 2022	In Force
Poland	02 Jun 1995	In Force
Portugal	24 Feb 1983	In Force
Moldova	09 Dec 1997	In Force
Romania	28 Oct 1975	In Force
Saint Vincent and the Grenadines	09 Nov 2010	In Force
Serbia	24 Nov 2000	In Force
Slovakia	17 Sep 2009	In Force
Slovenia	29 May 1992	In Force
Spain	5 May 1971	In Force
Sweden	14 May 1970	In Force
Syrian Arab Republic	18 Apr 1972	In Force
Togo	30 Mar 2012	In Force
Ukraine	10 Nov 2004	In Force
Uruguay	28 Jun 1973	In Force
Uzbekistan	19 Nov 2019	In Force
Zambia	23 Dec 2013	In Force
Zimbabwe	16 Sep 1993	In Force
