= Health Protection and Medical Care (Seafarers) Convention, 1987 =

International Labour Organization Convention

C164
- ILO Convention
- Date of adoption: October 8, 1987
- Date in force: January 11, 1991
- Classification: Safety, Health and Welfare
- Subject: Seafarers
- Previous: Seafarers' Welfare Convention, 1987
- Next: Social Security (Seafarers) Convention (Revised), 1987

Health Protection and Medical Care (Seafarers) Convention, 1987 is an International Labour Organization Convention.

It was established in 1987, with the preamble stating:

Having decided upon the adoption of certain proposals with regard to health protection and medical care for seafarers,...

== Ratifications ==
As of 2023, the convention has been ratified by 15 states. Of the ratifying states, twelve have subsequently denounced the treaty.

Country	Date	Status
Czech Republic	01 Jan 1993	In Force
Mexico	05 Oct 1990	In Force
Turkey	17 Mar 2005	In Force

== Revision ==
The principles of the convention were revised and incorporated into the Maritime Labour Convention.
