= Private Employment Agencies Convention, 1997 =

International Labour Organization Convention

C181
- ILO Convention
- Date of adoption: 19 June 1997
- Date in force: 10 May 2000
- Classification: Employment Services - Job Placement
- Subject: Employment policy and Promotion
- Previous: Seafarers' Hours of Work and the Manning of Ships Convention, 1996
- Next: Worst Forms of Child Labour Convention, 1999

Private Employment Agencies Convention, 1997 is an International Labour Organization Convention.

It was established in 1997, with the preamble stating:

Recalling the provisions of the Forced Labour Convention, 1930, the Freedom of Association and Protection of the Right to Organise Convention, 1948, the Right to Organise and Collective Bargaining Convention, 1949, the Discrimination (Employment and Occupation) Convention, 1958, the Employment Policy Convention, 1964, the Minimum Age Convention, 1973, the Employment Promotion and Protection against Unemployment Convention, 1988, and the provisions relating to recruitment and placement in the Migration for Employment Convention (Revised), 1949, and the Migrant Workers (Supplementary Provisions) Convention, 1975, and

Having decided upon the adoption of certain proposals with regard to the revision of the Fee-Charging Employment Agencies Convention (Revised), 1949,...

This Convention applies to all private employment offices, to all categories of workers and to all branches of economic activity. It does not apply to the recruitment and accommodation of seafarers. The purpose of the convention is to enable all private employment agencies to operate and to ensure the protection of workers using their services within the limits of its provisions. According to the convention, private employment agencies have to treat all employees equally without discrimination because of race, color, sex, religion, political opinion, national exclusion or social origin.

== Ratifications ==
As of March 2023, the convention has been ratified by 37 states. These states are:

Albania	30 Jun 1999	In Force
Algeria	06 Jun 2006	In Force
Antigua and Barbuda	28 Jul 2021	In Force
Belgium	28 Sep 2004	In Force
Bosnia and Herzegovina	18 Jan 2010	In Force
Bulgaria	24 Mar 2005	In Force
Czech Republic	09 Oct 2000	In Force
Ethiopia	24 Mar 1999	In Force
Fiji	21 Jan 2013	In Force
Finland	25 May 1999	In Force
France	28 Oct 2015	In Force
Georgia	27 Aug 2002	In Force
Hungary	19 Sep 2003	In Force
Israel	04 Oct 2012	In Force
Italy	01 Feb 2000	In Force
Japan	28 Jul 1999	In Force
Lithuania	19 Mar 2004	In Force
Madagascar	11 Jun 2019	In Force
Mali	12 Apr 2016	In Force
Mongolia	17 Apr 2015	In Force
Morocco	10 May 1999	In Force
Netherlands	15 Sep 1999	In Force
Niger	14 May 2015	In Force
North Macedonia	03 Oct 2012	In Force
Panama	10 Aug 1999	In Force
Poland	15 Sep 2008	In Force
Portugal	25 Mar 2002	In Force
Republic of Moldova	19 Dec 2001	In Force
Rwanda	29 Jun 2018	In Force
Serbia	15 Mar 2013	In Force
Sierra Leone	25 Aug 2021	In Force
Slovakia	22 Feb 2010	In Force
Somalia	08 Mar 2021	In Force
Spain	15 Jun 1999	In Force
Suriname	12 Apr 2006	In Force
Uruguay	14 Jun 2004	In Force
Zambia	23 Dec 2013	In Force
