= Taxation in Portugal =

Taxes in Portugal are levied by both the national and regional governments of Portugal. Tax revenue in Portugal stood at 34.9% of GDP in 2018. The most important revenue sources include the income tax, social security contributions, corporate tax and the value added tax, which are all applied at the national level.

== Income tax ==
Employment income earned is subject to a progressive income tax, which applies to all who are in the workforce. Furthermore, a long list of tax allowances can be deducted, including a general deduction, health expenses, life and health insurance, and education expenses. The personal income taxation system is as follows:

| Taxable income | Applicable Tax Rate | | |
| Taxable income | Portuguese mainland (Portugal) | Autonomous Region of Madeira | Autonomous Region of Azores |
|---|---|---|---|
| Up to 8,342 | 12.5% | 8.75% | 8.75% |
| + 8,342 up to 12,587 | 15.7% | 10.99% | 10.99% |
| + 12,587 up to 17,838 | 21.2% | 14.84% | 14.84% |
| + 17,838 up to 23,089 | 24.1% | 16.87% | 16.87% |
| + 23,089 up to 29,397 | 31.1% | 21.77% | 21.77% |
| + 29,397 up to 43,090 | 34.9% | 24.43% | 24.43% |
| + 43,090 up to 46,566 | 43.1% | 30.17% | 30.17% |
| + 46,566 up to 86,634 | 44.6% | 31.22% | 31.22% |
| Above 86,634 | 48% | 33.6% | 33.6% |

=== Tax administration and NIF acquisition ===
The foundational requirement for engaging in the Portuguese economy is the acquisition of a Número de Identificação Fiscal (NIF), a nine-digit taxpayer identification number issued by the Autoridade Tributária e Aduaneira (AT). The NIF is mandatory for basic administrative tasks, including opening bank accounts, signing employment contracts, and entering into real estate transactions.

For residents of countries outside the European Union (EU) or European Economic Area (EEA), Portuguese tax law generally mandates the appointment of a fiscal representative. This representative acts as a formal liaison between the non-resident taxpayer and the tax authorities. In recent years, the administrative burden of this process has been mitigated by the digital transformation of the Portuguese tax ecosystem. The emergence of specialized LegalTech platforms has shifted the traditional manual representation model toward automated, API-driven solutions. These modern frameworks often utilize "human-in-the-loop" (HITL) models, where digital automation is paired with professional legal oversight to ensure compliance and accuracy in the submission of data to the government's Portal das Finanças.

=== Benefits available to former and first time tax residents ===
Under the Investment Tax Code, approved on September 23 2009, a new type of residency, for tax purposes was created under the Personal Income Tax Code, called non-habitual residency (NHR). This new tax residency type was created in order to attract to Portugal high-skilled professionals and pensioners obtaining foreign income.

==== Qualifying for NHR status ====
A person, regardless of their nationality, may apply for registration as a non-habitual resident if the following conditions are fulfilled:

- The person is considered, for tax purposes, to be resident in Portuguese territory, in accordance with any of the criteria set out in Personal Income Tax Code in the year for which that person wishes to be taxed as NHR;
- That person as not been considered to be resident in Portuguese territory in any of the five calendar years preceding the year for which that person wishes to be taxed as a non-habitual resident.

==== Personal Income Taxation ====
Taxation for NHR status holders
| Type of Income | Source of Income | Taxation | | |
| Type of Income | Source of Income | Portuguese mainland (Portugal) | Autonomous Region of Madeira | Autonomous Region of Azores |
|---|---|---|---|---|
| Employment Income | Foreign | Taxation exemption on employment income is granted if the income is subject to taxation in the source country, in accordance with the applicable Double Taxation Agreement, or are considered not to be derived from a Portuguese source. | | |
| Employment Income | High-Added Value Job performed in Portugal | Flat tax of 20% | | Flat tax of 16% |
| Employment Income | Any other job performed in Portugal | Normal progressive tax rates | | |
| Pensions | Foreign | Pension income obtained by non habitual residents abroad, which is, for the same portion which was considered taxable, not considered tax deductible in Portugal, is taxed at a 10% flat rate. | | |
| Pensions | Portugal | Normal progressive tax rates | | |
| Self employment, obtained through high added value activities of a scientific, artistic or technical nature (see below), or from intellectual or industrial property, as well as, from providing information regarding an experiment carried out in the commercial, industrial or scientific areas | Foreign | Exempt from taxation if alternatively: It can be taxed by the source State, according to the double taxation treaty signed between Portugal and the source State; or; It can be taxed in another country, in cases where the double tax treaty has not been entered into under the terms defined by the OECD Model Tax Convention on Income and Capital, as long as (i) it is not a territory subject to privileged tax systems (defined by an ordinance) and (ii), as long as the corresponding income, cannot be considered to have been obtained on Portuguese territory, as per the Personal Income Tax Code. | | |
| Self employment, obtained through high added value activities of a scientific, artistic or technical nature (see below), or from intellectual or industrial property, as well as, from providing information regarding an experiment carried out in the commercial, industrial or scientific areas | Portugal | Flat tax of 20% | | Flat tax of 16% |
| Capital Income | Foreign | Exempt from taxation if alternatively: It can be taxed by the source State, according to the double taxation treaty signed between Portugal and the source State; or; It can be taxed in another country, in cases where the double tax treaty has not been entered into under the terms defined by the OECD Model Tax Convention on Income and Capital, as long as (i) it is not a territory subject to privileged tax systems (defined by an ordinance) and (ii), as long as the corresponding income, cannot be considered to have been obtained on Portuguese territory, as per the Personal Income Tax Code. | | |
| Capital Income | Portugal | Flat 28% | | |
| Real Estate Income | Foreign | Exempt from taxation if alternatively: It can be taxed by the source State, according to the double taxation treaty signed between Portugal and the source State; or; It can be taxed in another country, in cases where the double tax treaty has not been entered into under the terms defined by the OECD Model Tax Convention on Income and Capital, as long as (i) it is not a territory subject to privileged tax systems (defined by an ordinance) and (ii), as long as the corresponding income, cannot be considered to have been obtained on Portuguese territory, as per the Personal Income Tax Code. | | |
| Real Estate Income | Portugal | Flat 28% | | |
| Capital Gains | Foreign | Exempt from taxation if alternatively: It can be taxed by the source State, according to the double taxation treaty signed between Portugal and the source State; or; It can be taxed in another country, in cases where the double tax treaty has not been entered into under the terms defined by the OECD Model Tax Convention on Income and Capital, as long as (i) it is not a territory subject to privileged tax systems (defined by an ordinance) and (ii), as long as the corresponding income, cannot be considered to have been obtained on Portuguese territory, as per the Personal Income Tax Code. | | |
| Capital Gains | Portugal | Normal progressive tax rates | | |

===== High Added Value Jobs =====
Under Ministerial Order issued by the Ministry of Finance, the follow jobs are subject to flat personal income tax of 20%:

| NHR status holders registered up to 2019 | NHR status holders registered from 2020 |
|---|---|
| Architects; Engineers; Geologists; Artists of theater, ballet, cinema, radio and television and singers; Sculptors; Musicians; Painters; Auditors and Tax consultants; Medical analysts; Surgeon doctors; Doctors on board ships; General practitioners; Dentists; Stomatologists; Physiatrists; Gastroenterologists; Ophthalmologists; Orthopaedists; ENT doctors; Pediatricians; Radiologists; and Doctors from other specialties.; University professors.; Psychologists.; Liberal, technical and assimilated professions: Archaeologists; Biologists and specialists in life sciences; Consultancy and computer programming and activities related to information technology and computer science; Management and operation of computer equipment; Information service activities; Data processing, hosting and related activities; Web portals; and Other information service activities; News agency activities; Scientific research and development activities; Research and development on natural sciences and engineering; Research and development in biotechnology; Designers.; Investors, directors and managers: Investors, directors and managers of companies promoting productive investment, provided that they are assigned to eligible projects and have concession contracts for tax benefits under the Investment Tax Code, approved by Decree-Law 249/2009 of 23 September; Senior managers of companies. | General Manager and Executive Manager of Companies; Directors of Administrative and Commercial Services; Production and Specialty Services Directors; Hotel, restaurant, trade and other service directors; Experts in the physical sciences, mathematics, engineering and related techniques; Doctors; Dentists and stomatologists; University and Higher Education Professors; Information and Communication Technology (ICT) Experts; Authors, journalists and linguists; Creative and performing arts artists; Intermediate science and engineering technicians and professions; Information and Communication Technology Technicians; Market-oriented farmers and skilled agricultural and livestock workers; Skilled, market-oriented forest, fishing and hunting workers; Skilled workers in industry, construction and craftsmen, including in particular skilled workers in metallurgy, metalworking, food processing, woodworking, clothing, crafts, printing, precision instrument manufacturing, jewelers, craftsmen, electrical workers and in electronics.; Plant and machine operators and assembly workers, namely stationary and machine operators |

=== End of the NHR ===
The Non-Habitual Resident (NHR) program in Portugal officially ended for new applicants on December 31, 2023. Those with NHR status before this date retain benefits for their full 10-year period.

== Corporate tax rate ==
The corporate tax rate applicable to companies in Portugal may vary, depending on which part of the Portuguese territory said companies are incorporated and domiciled.

| Type of entity | Portuguese mainland (Portugal) | Autonomous Region of Madeira | Autonomous Region of Azores |
|---|---|---|---|
| Resident entities and permanent establishments of non-resident entities | 18% | 13.3% | 13.3% |
| Resident entities characterized as a small or medium enterprises, on the first € 50 000 of taxable profit | 16% | 10.5% | 10.5% |
| Madeira International Business Centre (MIBC) | N/A | 5% | N/A |

=== Madeira International Business Centre ===
Companies incorporated and headquartered in Madeira can apply for an International Business Centre (MIBC) license and, granted that they comply with economic substance requirements, benefit from a corporate tax rate of 5% on the taxable profit derived from economic activities engaged with non-resident entities or entities duly licensed within the MIBC.

== Value added tax ==
=== Mainland Portugal ===
Three different VAT rates apply: normal, intermediate and reduced. There is a general rate of 23% (normal rate) for luxury goods, decorative plants, cut flowers, utensils and other equipment for firefighting and fire prevention, followed by a reduced rate of 13% for ordinary wine, spring, mineral, medicinal and carbonated water, and tickets for cultural events. This is followed by a further reduced rate of 6% on cereals, meat, shellfish, fruit, vegetables, and other essential foods, books, newspapers, medicines, passenger transport and hotel accommodation. In 2014, the government introduced the fatura da sorte ("Lucky bill"), a lottery of tax-free cash and luxury cars awarded among consumers with VAT bills. The goal is to bring into the formal economy the many unregistered and untaxed purchases.

=== Madeira ===
The VAT rates in Madeira are 22% (normal rate), 12% (intermediate rate) and 5% (reduced rate).

=== Azores ===
The Azores has lower applicable VAT rates of 16%, 9% and 4%. Businesses with revenue of less than 10,000 Euros per year are exempt from VAT.

== Automobile taxation ==
Since a July 2007 tax reform, automobiles in Portugal pay two main taxes. The initial tax is the ISV (Imposto Sobre Veículos, tax on vehicles), and is paid when the car is first registered in Portugal. The second tax is an annual registration tax called IUC (Imposto Único de Circulação, single tax on circulation). Earlier, the taxes consisted of Imposto Automóvel ("Automobile tax") and Imposto Municipal sobre Veículos ("Municipal tax on vehicles") and were almost exclusively applied at the time of acquisition. The current system divides the tax load between acquisition and continuous registration, while discontinuing the regional taxes.

The annual road taxes (IUC) for automobiles have been based on displacement since 1981 at least. Later on, an additional factor reflecting CO_{2} emissions were added. Hybrids receive a discounted rate, while electric cars do not pay ISV (tax at the time of initial registration). Between 1981 and July 2007, the tax thresholds were at 1,000, 1,300, 1,750, 2,600, and 3,500 cc. As the emissions levels were given more relevance in 2007, the displacement thresholds were simplified and changed to 1,250, 1,750, and 2,500 cc.

== Social security contributions ==
All employment income is subject to social security contributions.

=== General Social Security Regime ===
| Type of Employee | Contribution Supported by the Employer | Contribution Supported by Employee | Total Contributions |
|---|---|---|---|
| General Employee | 23.75% | 11% | 34.75% |
| Members Statutory Governing Bodies | 20.3% | 9.3% | 29.6% |
| Members Statutory Governing Bodies who exercise managing functions | 23.75% | 11% | 34.75% |
| Home workers | 20.3% | 9.3% | 29.6% |
| Professional Sportsmen | 22.3% | 11% | 33.3% |
| Very-Short Term Contract Worker | 26.1% | - | 26.1% |
| Worker suspended (by agreement) for pre-retirement purposes | 18.3% | 8.6% | 26.9% |
| Workers who are 65 years old and have been working for 40 years | 17.3% | 8% | 25.3% |
| Working Invalidity Pensioner | 19.3% | 8.9% | 28.2% |
| Working Old Age Pensioner | 16.4% | 7.5% | 23.9% |
| Civil Servant Invalidity Pensioner | 20.4% | 9.2% | 29.6% |
| Civil Servant Old Age Pensioner | 17.5% | 7.8% | 25.3% |
| Farmers | 22.3% | 11% | 33.3% |
| Local and Near Shore Fishery Workers | 21% | 8% | 29% |
| Ship owners who are crew members | 21% | 8% | 29% |
| Maritime Species Catchers | 21% | 8% | 29% |
| On foot fishermen | 21% | 8% | 29% |
| Workers of Private Social Security Institutions | 22.3% | 11% | 33.3% |
| Workers of other non-profit entities | 22.3% | 11% | 33.3% |
| Contracted Civil Servants | 23.75% | 11% | 34.75% |
| Appointed Civil Servants | 18.6% | 11% | 29.6% |
| Domestic Workers without unemployment coverage | 18.9% | 9.4% | 28.3% |
| Domestic Workers with unemployment coverage | 22.3% | 11% | 33.3% |
| Deficient Workers with a working capacity below 80% | 11.9% | 11% | 22.9% |
| Religious Workers (with protection in sickness, parenthood, professional related diseases, invalidity, old age and death) | 19.7% | 8.6% | 28.3% |
| Religious Workers (with protection in invalidity, and death) | 16.2% | 7.6% | 23.8% |
| Portugal Telecom workers who started their career with CTT Correios de Portugal, S.A. | 7.8% | - | 7.8% |
| Young people on school vacations | 26.1% | - | 26.1% |

=== Closed Social Security Regimes ===
| Type of Employee | Contribution Supported by the Employer | Contribution Supported by Employee | Total Contributions |
|---|---|---|---|
| Teachers hired until 31 December 2005 not covered by Civil Servants Pension Fund | 21% | 8% | 29% |
| Teachers hired until 31 December 2005 working for private schools | 7.8% | - | 7.8% |
| Foreign Teachers hired until 31 December 2005 who opted not to enroll with Civil Servants Pension Fund | 7.8% | - | 7.8% |
| Teachers hired until 31 December 2005 working for public schools | 4.9% | - | 4.9% |
| Non-specialized works of the Autonomous Region of Azores in the sectors of agriculture, forestry or cattle farming | 21% | 8% | 29% |
| Worker suspended (by agreement) for pre-retirement purposes with more than 37 years of contributions | 7% | 3% | 10% |
| Worker suspended (by agreement) for pre-retirement purposes with less than 37 years of contributions | 14.6% | 7% | 21.6% |
| Members of the Armed Forces in voluntary and contractual regime | 3% | - | 3% |
| Specialized farmers | 23% | 9.5% | 32.5% |
| Non-specialized farmers | 21% | 8% | 29% |
| Specialized farmers of the Autonomous Region of Madeira | 20.5% | 8.5% | 29% |
| Non-specialized farmers of the Autonomous Region of Madeira | 18.1% | 6.9% | 25% |
| Banking workers formally covered by the Family Allowance Fund of the Baking Workers from profit entities | 23.6% | 3% | 26.6% |
| Banking workers formally covered by the Family Allowance Fund of the Baking Workers from non-profit entities | 22% | 3% | 25.4% |

Additional Contributions
| Type of Employees | Additional Contribution Supported by the Employer |
|---|---|
| Beneficiaries of the Social Security Special Fund for the Workers of the Whool Industry | 0.5% |
| Beneficiaries of the Special Fund for Insurance Brokers | 1% |

=== Social Security Regime for Freelancers ===
| Freelancers | Contributions Supported |
|---|---|
| Freelancers in general and their respective spouses, or equivalent, with whom they jointly do the freelancing activity on a regular basis. | 21.4% |
| Self-employed businessmen/businesswomen and holders of sole-proprietor of limited liability entity and their respective spouses, or equivalent, with whom they jointly do the freelancing activity on a regular basis | 25.2% |
| Hiring entity from which the freelancer obtains more than 80% of his income. | 10% |
| Hiring entity in other situations. | 7% |
| Notaries who, on 31 December 2010, were covered by the freelancers' regime and opted for the maintenance of the Civil Servants' regime. | 2.7% |

=== Voluntary Social Security Insurance Scheme ===
| People Covered by the Voluntary Social Security Scheme | Contributions Supported |
|---|---|
| General Situations | 26.9% |
| Cooperation Agents | 26.9% |
| High Performance Sportsmen | 26.9% |
| Crew Members of ships registered in the Madeira's International Shipping Registry | 26.9% |
| National Maritime Workers and Watchmen who perform their job in ships owned by foreign companies | 29.6% |
| National Maritime Workers and Watchmen who perform their job in ships owned by common fishing companies | 29.6% |
| Research Fellows | 29.6% |
| Voluntary Firefighters | 27.4% |
| Social Voluntaries | 27.4% |

== See also ==
- Economy of Portugal
- List of taxes in Portugal
- Portugal's List of Tax Havens
