= Recruitment and Placement of Seafarers Convention, 1996 =

International Labour Organization Convention

C179
- ILO Convention
- Date of adoption: October 22, 1996
- Date in force: April 22, 2000
- Classification: Seafarers
- Subject: Seafarers
- Previous: Labour Inspection (Seafarers) Convention, 1996
- Next: Seafarers' Hours of Work and the Manning of Ships Convention, 1996

Recruitment and Placement of Seafarers Convention, 1996 is an International Labour Organization Convention.

It was established in 1996, with the preamble stating:

Recalling the entry into force of the United Nations Convention on the Law of the Sea, 1982, on 16 November 1994, and

Having decided upon the adoption of certain proposals with regard to the revision of the Placing of Seamen Convention, 1920, ..

== Ratifications ==
As of 2022, the convention had been ratified by 10 states. However, all have subsequently denounced it.

== Recruitment and Placement of Seafarers Convention and COVID-19 ==
The International Labour Organisation (ILO), taking into account the Recruitment and Placement of Seafarers Convention, called on governments to immediately adopt possible measures in the interests of seafarers and to take steps to minimize the risk of COVID-19 virus infection. The ILO Memorandum sought to coordinate the International Maritime Organisation (IMO) and World Health Organization(WHO) action strategies to prevent the spread of COVID-19.
