= List of taxes in Portugal =

List of taxes in Portugal covers the types of taxes in Portugal. They are: Taxes on consumption, Taxes on assets, Taxes on income, Excise taxes and Taxes on vehicles.

== Taxes on consumption ==
- Value added tax – the general VAT rate in Portugal is 23%, however, there are 3 types of VAT rates (normal, intermediate and reduced) which are different in mainland Portugal, Madeira and Azores. The VAT is levied on the purchase of almost all goods and services.
- Stamp duty – is a consumption tax. It is the oldest tax in Portugal established in 1660. Stamp duty is levied on several contracts, documents, papers in Portugal and charged by a fixed amount or by the application of a fee to the value of the act or contract.

== Taxes on assets ==
- Municipal Property Tax – is a tax for the owners of a property. Rates differ in municipalities decided by the municipal assemblies.
- Add-on MPT – this type of MPT is applied to the owners of residential real estate of the joint equity value of more than 600 thousand euros.
- Property Transfer Tax – is a tax levied on the transmissions of property rights.
- Stamp duty – It is levied on documents. In case of transferring the property free of charge, Property Transfer Tax is not applied, but Stamp tax should be paid.

== Taxes on income ==
- Personal Income Tax – is a tax paid by Portuguese citizens domiciled in Portugal for their worldwide income. Non-residents of Portugal only pay this tax for their Portuguese sourced income.
- Corporate Income Tax – is a tax applied to the income of companies operating in the territory of Portugal.
- Surtax (Derrama) – is a municipal tax addition to the CIT. levied on the taxable income of legal persons. The tax rate differs throughout Portugal because it is defined by each municipality.

== Excise taxes ==
- Tax on Alcohol and Alcoholic Beverages – is a tax levied on wine, beer, fermented beverages, spirits, other alcoholic beverages, as well as ethyl alcohol.
- Tax on Petroleum and Energy Products – is a tax paid for petroleum and energy products such as gasoline, diesel, propane, butane and oil, products used as fuel for sale and consumption, moreover, other hydrocarbons except peat and natural gas.
- Tobacco Tax – is paid for the cigars, cigarillos, cigarettes and different types of tobacco, as well as electronic cigarettes.

== Taxes on vehicles ==
- Vehicle tax – replacing the Automobile Tax in 2007, vehicle tax is paid by the car-owners in the case of purchasing or importing a car. This tax is aimed to make the car owners responsible for the costs caused by road infrastructure, environmental impact and road accidents. This type of tax covers passenger cars, mixed cars, market cars, motorcycles, tricycles, quadracycles, as well as motorhomes. It is paid only at the first registration of the vehicle.
- Single tax of circulation – is an annual tax on all vehicles registered in Portugal. This tax is aimed to make the drivers responsible for the emission of CO_{2} and harming the environment.
- ADD-on STC – is to be paid for the most polluting new vehicles (purchased since January 2017) and for diesel vehicles.

== See also ==
- Taxation in Portugal
- Economy of Portugal
