= Hours of Work and Rest Periods (Road Transport) Convention, 1979 =

International Labour Organization Convention

C153
- ILO Convention
- Date of adoption: June 27, 1979
- Date in force: February 10, 1983
- Classification: Hours of Work
- Subject: Working Time
- Previous: Occupational Safety and Health (Dock Work) Convention, 1979
- Next: Collective Bargaining Convention, 1981

Hours of Work and Rest Periods (Road Transport) Convention, 1979 is an International Labour Organization Convention.

It was established in 1979, with the preamble stating:

Having decided upon the adoption of certain proposals with regard to hours of work and rest periods in road transport,...

== Modification ==
The convention is a revision of ILO Convention C67, Hours of Work and Rest Periods (Road Transport) Convention, 1939 (shelved).

== Ratifications ==
As of 2022, the convention has been ratified by nine states.

Country	Date
Ecuador	20 May 1988
Iraq	17 April 1985
Mexico	10 February 1982
Spain	7 February 1985
Switzerland	4 May 1981
Turkey	17 March 2005
Ukraine	9 June 2008
Uruguay	19 June 1989
Bolivarian Republic of Venezuela	5 July 1983
