= Labour Inspection (Seafarers) Convention, 1996 =

International Labour Organization Convention

C178
- ILO Convention
- Date of adoption: October 22, 1996
- Date in force: April 22, 2000
- Classification: Seafarers
- Subject: Seafarers
- Previous: Home Work Convention, 1996
- Next: Recruitment and Placement of Seafarers Convention, 1996

Labour Inspection (Seafarers) Convention, 1996 is an International Labour Organization Convention.

It was established in 1996, with the preamble stating:

Recalling the entry into force of the United Nations Convention on the Law of the Sea, 1982, on 16 November 1994, and Having decided upon the adoption of certain proposals with regard to the revision of the Labour Inspection (Seamen) Recommendation, 1926, ...

== Ratifications ==
As of 2022, 15 states have ratified the convention. However, fourteen of ratifying states have subsequently denounced it.

== Marine labour issues on COVID-19 ==
The strategy of the International Maritime Organization (IMO) and the World Health Organization (WHO) had been coordinated to prevent the spread of COVID-19, the aim of the ILO Memorandum.

Seafarers and shipowners were supported by both the International Chamber of Shipping and the International Transport Workers' Federation. The International Maritime Chamber has assisted in issuing a 'Coronavirus (COVID-19) Guidance for Ship Operators for the Protection of the Health of Seafarers' while the International Transport Workers' Federation has issued the 'COVID-19 advice to ships and seafarers.'

According to the 2006 MLC, derogations, exemptions or other clauses are possible. Governments are provided with a flexible interpretation of the convention. Decisions are taken in consultation with shipowners' and seafarers' organizations, taking into account all the factors proposed by the government concerned to the office.

Some external circumstances can make it difficult to implement the obligations laid down in Labour Inspection (Seafarers) Convention, 1996.
