= Home Work Convention =

International Labour Organization Convention

Home Work Convention, 1996
C177
- ILO Convention
- Date of adoption: June 22, 1996
- Date in force: April 22, 2000
- Classification: Conditions of employment
- Subject: Specific Categories of Workers
- Previous: Safety and Health in Mines Convention, 1995
- Next: Labour Inspection (Seafarers) Convention, 1996

Home Work Convention, created in 1996, is an International Labour Organization (ILO) Convention, which came into force in 2000. It offers protection to workers who are employed in their own homes.

== Overview ==
It was established in 1996, with the preamble stating:

Noting that the particular conditions characterizing home work make it desirable to improve the application of those Conventions and Recommendations to homeworkers, and to supplement them by standards which take into account the special characteristics of home work

The Convention provides protection for home workers, giving them equal rights with regard to workplace health and safety, social security rights, access to training, remuneration, minimum age of employment, maternity protection, and other rights.

== Objectives of the Home Work Convention ==
The term home work means remote work done by a person in a place other than the workplace of the employer. The term employer describes a person, who, either directly or through an intermediary, provides home work in pursuance of his or her business.

Each member of the Convention aims the continuous improving the situation of homeworkers. The intention of the convention is to strengthen the principle of equal treatment, in particular to guarantee the establishment of the rights of homeworkers.

In addition, the convention has the specific purpose of protecting against discrimination in the following areas of employment: occupational safety, remuneration, social security protection, access to training, minimum age for taking up employment and maternity benefits.

== Safety and health at work ==
National laws and regulations on safety and health at work also apply to home work. When working at home, certain conditions must be adapted so that a safe and healthy working environment is ensured.

== Ratifications ==
The convention has been ratified by 13 countries as of 2024:

Country	Date	Status
Albania	24 Jul 2002	In Force
Antigua and Barbuda	28 Jul 2021	In Force
Argentina	31 Jul 2006	In Force
Belgium	02 Oct 2012	In Force
Bosnia and Herzegovina	18 Jan 2010	In Force
Bulgaria	17 Jul 2009	In Force
Finland	17 Jun 1998	In Force
Ireland	22 Apr 1999	In Force
Netherlands	31 Oct 2002	In Force
North Macedonia	03 Oct 2012	In Force
Slovenia	14 Apr 2021	In Force
Spain	25 May 2022	In Force
Tajikistan	29 May 2012	In Force
