= Siemens C65 =

2004 mobile phone

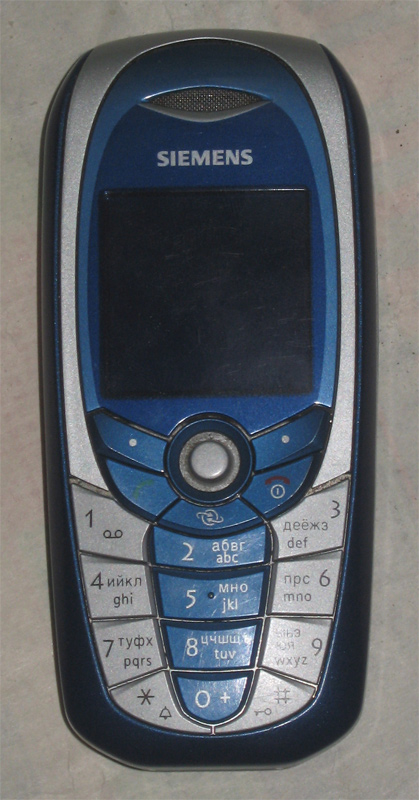
- Manufacturer: Siemens
- Predecessor: Siemens C60; Siemens C62
- Successor: Siemens C75
- Related: Siemens C70; Siemens C72; Siemens CFX65
- Compatible networks: GSM 900/1800/1900 (C65); GSM 850/1800/1900 (C66)
- Form factor: Candybar
- Dimensions: 100×45×16 mm (3.94×1.77×0.63 in)
- Weight: 86 g (including battery)
- Operating system: Siemens properties X60 platform
- Memory: 10MB
- Battery: 600 mAh Li-Ion
- Rear camera: Common Intermediate Format 0.1 Mpix
- Front camera: -
- Display: 130x130 px, CSTN, 65K colors
- Connectivity: IrDA, USB, CSD, GPRS
- Data inputs: Keypad, Joystick

The Siemens C65 is a mobile phone announced by Siemens. This phone is under “C-Class” leveling of Siemens for entry levels/ consumer regularly. It was released in March 2004. It weighs 86 g and its dimensions are 100 x 45 x 16 mm (length x width x depth). Its display is a 130x130 pixels, 65K colors CSTN LCD. Its carrier-engineered variants are Siemens CT65, CV65 and CO65, exclusively for three mainly mobile operators T-Mobile, Vodafone and O2 respectively. It is known in North America as the Siemens C66.

== Reviews ==
GSM Arena praised it as good value but criticised the poor camera. CNet agreed that it provided good value.
