= Accommodation of Crews Convention, 1946 =

International Labour Organization Convention

C75
- ILO Convention
- Date of adoption: June 29, 1946
- Date in force: not in force
- Classification: Safety, Health and Welfare
- Subject: Seafarers
- Previous: Certification of Able Seamen Convention, 1946
- Next: Wages, Hours of Work and Manning (Sea) Convention, 1946

Accommodation of Crews Convention, 1946 is an International Labour Organization Convention.

It was established in 1946, with the preamble stating:

Having decided upon the adoption of certain proposals with regard to crew accommodation on board ship,...

== Modification ==
The convention has not been brought into force. Its principles were subsequently revised in 1949 by Convention C92, Accommodation of Crews Convention (Revised), 1949.
