= Seafarers' Welfare Convention, 1987 =

International Labour Organization Convention

C163
- ILO Convention
- Date of adoption: October 8, 1987
- Date in force: October 3, 1990
- Classification: Safety, Health and Welfare
- Subject: Seafarers
- Previous: Asbestos Convention, 1986
- Next: Health Protection and Medical Care (Seafarers) Convention, 1987

Seafarers' Welfare Convention, 1987 is an International Labour Organization Convention.

It was established in 1987, with the preamble stating:

Having decided upon the adoption of certain proposals with regard to seafarers' welfare at sea and in port...

== Ratifications ==
As of 2022, the convention has been ratified by 18 states. However, 14 of the ratifying states have subsequently denounced the treaty automatically by ratifying the Maritime Labour Convention, 2006.
