= International Convention on Oil Pollution Preparedness, Response and Co-operation =

International Convention on Oil Pollution Preparedness, Response and Co-operation (OPRC) is an international maritime convention establishing measures for dealing with marine oil pollution incidents nationally and in co-operation with other countries. As of November 2018, there are 112 state parties to the convention.

OPRC Convention was drafted within the framework of the International Maritime Organization and adopted in 1990 entering into force in 1995. In 2000 a protocol to the Convention relating to hazardous and noxious substances (HNS) was adopted (the OPRC-HNS Protocol).

In accordance with this convention and its annex, states-parties to the 1990 convention undertake, individually or jointly, to take all appropriate measures to prepare for and respond to oil pollution incidents.

== Scope ==
The Convention applies to:

- vessels of any type whatsoever operating in the marine environment including hydrofoil boats, air-cushion vehicles, submersibles, and floating craft of any type;
- fixed or floating offshore installations or structures engaged in gas or oil exploration, exploitation or production activities, or loading or unloading of oil; and
- sea ports and oil handling facilities (those facilities which present a risk of an oil pollution incident, including, inter alia, sea ports, oil terminals, pipelines and other oil handling facilities).

The Convention does not apply to warships, naval auxiliary or other ships owned or operated by a state and used only on government non-commercial service. However, parties to the Convention ensure by the adoption of appropriate measures that such ships act in a manner consistent with the convention.

== Oil pollution emergency plans ==
Ships are required to carry a shipboard oil pollution emergency plan, in accordance with the provisions adopted by the International Maritime Organization (IMO) for this purpose. These plans are subject, while in a port or at an offshore terminal under the jurisdiction of a party, to inspection by officers duly authorized by that party.

Operators of offshore units under the jurisdiction of the parties are required to have oil pollution emergency plans, which are co-ordinated with the national system for responding to oil pollution incidents, approved in accordance with procedures established by the competent national authority.

Authorities or operators in charge of sea ports and oil handling facilities under the jurisdiction of parties are also required to have oil pollution emergency plans or similar arrangements which are co-ordinated with the national oil pollution response system).

== Oil pollution reporting procedures ==
In accordance with the Convention masters or other persons having charge of ships flying the flag of a party and persons having charge of offshore units under the jurisdiction of a party are required to report without delay any event on their ship or offshore unit involving a discharge or probable discharge of oil:

(i) in the case of a ship, to the nearest coastal state;

(ii) in the case of an offshore unit, to the coastal state to whose jurisdiction the unit is subject.

Masters or other persons having charge of ships flying the flag of a party and persons having charge of offshore units under the jurisdiction of a party are also required to report without delay in a similar way any observed event at sea involving a discharge of oil or the presence of oil.

Persons having charge of sea ports and oil handling facilities under the jurisdiction of a party are required to report without delay any event involving a discharge or probable discharge of oil or the presence of oil to the competent national authority.

Parties to the convention are required to instruct its maritime inspection vessels or aircraft and other appropriate services or officials to report without delay any observed event at sea or at a sea port or oil handling facility involving a discharge of oil or the presence of oil to the competent national authority or to the nearest coastal state; and request the pilots of civil aircraft to report without delay any observed event at sea involving a discharge of oil or the presence of oil to the nearest coastal state).

== National and regional systems for preparedness and response ==
Each party is under obligation to establish a national system for responding promptly and effectively to oil pollution incidents. Such system comprises:

1. designated competent national authority or authorities with responsibility for oil pollution preparedness and response;
2. national operational contact point or points, responsible for the receipt and transmission of oil pollution reports; and
3. authority which is entitled to act on behalf of the state to request assistance or to decide to render the assistance requested.

Also, the system includes a national contingency plan for preparedness and response outlining the organizational relationship of the various involved bodies, public or private, taking into account guidelines developed by the IMO.

In addition, each party, either individually or through bilateral or multilateral co-operation and in co-operation with the oil and shipping industries, port authorities and other relevant entities, has to establish:

- a minimum level of pre-positioned oil spill combating equipment and programmes for its use;
- a programme of exercises for oil pollution response organizations and training of relevant personnel;
- detailed plans and communication capabilities for responding to an oil pollution incident; and
- a mechanism or arrangement to co-ordinate the response to an oil pollution incident with the capabilities to mobilize the necessary resources). Parties ensure that all relevant information is provided to the IMO.

== International co-operation in pollution response ==
Parties are required to co-operate and provide advisory services, technical support and equipment for the purpose of responding to an oil pollution incident upon the request of any party affected or likely to be affected by such incident. The financing of the costs for such assistance is based on the provisions set out in the annex to the convention.

== Salient features of OPRC ==
1. It aims at providing a global framework for international cooperation in combating major incidents or threats of marine pollution.
2. Parties to the convention are required to establish measures in dealing with pollution incidents, either nationally or with other countries.
3. Ships are required to carry a shipboard oil emergency plans.
4. Operators of offshore units are also required to have oil pollution emergency plans or similar arrangements, which must be coordinated with national systems for responding promptly and effectively to oil pollution incidents.
5. Ships are required to report incidents to coastal authorities and the convention details the actions that are to be taken.
6. The convention calls for the stockpiles of oil spill combating equipment, oil spill combating exercises and development of detailed plans for dealing with pollution incidents.
7. Parties to the convention are required to provide assistance to others in the event of a pollution emergency and provision is made for the reimbursement of any assistance provided.
8. A protocol to OPRC relating to hazardous and noxious substances (the OPRC-HNS Protocol) was adopted in 2000.
