= Social Security (Seafarers) Convention, 1946 =

International Labour Organization Convention

C70
- ILO Convention
- Date of adoption: June 28, 1946
- Date in force: Not in force
- Classification: Social Security
- Subject: Seafarers
- Previous: Certification of Ships' Cooks Convention, 1946
- Next: Seafarers' Pensions Convention, 1946

Social Security (Seafarers) Convention, 1946 is an International Labour Organization Convention.

It was established in 1946, with the preamble stating:

Having decided upon the adoption of certain proposals with regard to social security for seafarers,...

== Ratifications ==
The convention was ratified by seven states. It never came into force because the criteria set out in the convention were not met.

Country	Date	Notes
Algeria	November 19, 1962	
France	December 9, 1948	
Netherlands	December 22, 1961	
Peru	April 4, 1962	
Poland	November 8, 1956	
Spain	May 8, 1973	Denounced July 2, 1991
United Kingdom	May 20, 1953	

== Revision ==
The convention was revised into and superseded by Social Security (Seafarers) Convention (Revised), 1987.
