= Shipowners' Liability (Sick and Injured Seamen) Convention, 1936 =

International Labour Organization Convention

C55
- ILO Convention
- Date of adoption: November 24, 1936
- Date in force: November 29, 1939
- Classification: Social Security
- Subject: Seafarers
- Previous: Holidays with Pay (Sea) Convention, 1936
- Next: Sickness Insurance (Sea) Convention, 1936

Shipowners' Liability (Sick and Injured Seamen) Convention, 1936 is an International Labour Organization Convention.

It was established in 1936, with the preamble stating:

Having decided upon the adoption of certain proposals with regard to the liability of the shipowner in case of sickness, injury or death of seamen,...

The convention was ratified by the United States Senate and made effective by proclamation of the President on 29 October 1939, 54 Stat. 1963, 1704. In Warren v. United States, 340 U.S. 523 (1951), the Supreme Court considered the application and interpretation of Article 2 of the Convention in a seaman's case against his employer, the United States, in its capacity as owner of the merchant ship S. S. Anna Howard Shaw.

While on shore leave, the seaman visited a dance hall. An adjoining room overlooking the ocean had French doors that opened to an unprotected ledge. The seaman stepped out onto the ledge, lost his balance, and fell. He sued to recover maintenance and cure.

The district court awarded maintenance and cure and the Second Circuit Court of Appeals disallowed it. Reversing, the Supreme Court noted:

"The Convention was a product of the International Labor Organization. Its purpose was to provide an international system of regulation of the shipowner's liability. That international system was aimed at providing a reasonable average which could be applied in any country. . . . The aim indeed was not to change materially American standards but to equalize operating costs by raising the standards of member nations to the American level."

== Ratifications ==
As of 2023, 18 states have ratified the convention. It has subsequently been denounced by 13 of those ratifying states.

Country	Date	Status
Belgium	11 Apr 1938	Not in force
Belize	15 Jul 2005	Not in force
Bulgaria	29 Dec 1949	Not in force
Djibouti	03 Aug 1978	Not in force
Egypt	04 Aug 1982	In Force
France	19 Jun 1947	Not in force
Greece	19 Jun 1968	Not in force
Italy	22 Oct 1952	Not in force
Liberia	9 May 1960	Not in force
Luxembourg	15 Feb 1991	Not in force
Mexico	15 Sep 1939	In Force
Morocco	14 Mar 1958	Not in force
Panama	04 Jun 1971	Not in force
Peru	04 Apr 1962	In Force
Spain	30 Nov 1971	Not in force
Tunisia	14 Apr 1970	Not in force
Turkey	17 Mar 2005	In Force
United States of America	29 Oct 1938	In Force
