= Officers' Competency Certificates Convention, 1936 =

International Labour Organization Convention

C53
- ILO Convention
- Date of adoption: June 24, 1936
- Date in force: September 22, 1939
- Classification: Paid Leave
- Subject: Working Time
- Previous: Holidays with Pay Convention, 1936
- Next: Holidays with Pay (Sea) Convention, 1936

Officers' Competency Certificates Convention, 1936 is an International Labour Organization Convention.

It was established in 1936, with the preamble stating:

Having decided upon the adoption of certain proposals with regard to the establishment by each maritime country of a minimum requirement of professional capacity in the case of captain, navigating and engineer officers in charge of watches on board merchant ships, ...

== Ratifications ==
As of January 2023, the convention has been ratified by 37 states. It has subsequently been denounced by 26 of the ratifying states.
