= Collective Bargaining Convention, 1981 =

International Labour Organization Convention

Collective Bargaining Convention
Convention concerning the Promotion of Collective Bargaining
- Signed: June 19, 1981
- Location: Geneva
- Effective: August 11, 1983
- Condition: 2 ratifications
- Parties: 50
- Depositary: Director-General of the International Labour Office
- Languages: French and English

The Collective Bargaining Convention is an International Labour Organization Convention.

== Ratifications ==
As of April 2024, the convention is ratified by 51 states.

Country	Date	Status
Albania	24 Jul 2002	In Force
Antigua and Barbuda	16 Sep 2002	In Force
Argentina	29 Jan 1993	In Force
Armenia	29 Apr 2005	In Force
Azerbaijan	12 Aug 1993	In Force
Belarus	08 Sep 1997	In Force
Belgium	29 Mar 1988	In Force
Belize	22 Jun 1999	In Force
Benin	10 Jan 2012	In Force
Bosnia and Herzegovina	26 Sep 2014	In Force
Brazil	10 Jul 1992	In Force
Colombia	08 Dec 2000	In Force
Congo	26 Oct 2023	Will enter into force on 26 Oct 2024
Cyprus	16 Jan 1989	In Force
Czech Republic	06 Dec 2017	In Force
El Salvador	07 Jun 2022	In Force
Finland	09 Feb 1983	In Force
Gabon	06 Dec 1988	In Force
Greece	17 Sep 1996	In Force
Guatemala	29 Oct 1996	In Force
Hungary	04 Jan 1994	In Force
Kyrgyzstan	22 Dec 2003	In Force
Latvia	25 Jul 1994	In Force
Lithuania	26 Sep 1994	In Force
Madagascar	11 Jun 2019	In Force
Mauritius	23 Nov 2011	In Force
Morocco	03 Apr 2009	In Force
Netherlands	22 Dec 1993	In Force
Niger	05 Jun 1985	In Force
North Macedonia	22 Jul 2013	In Force
Norway	22 Jun 1982	In Force
Moldova	14 Feb 1997	In Force
Romania	15 Dec 1992	In Force
Russian Federation	06 Sep 2010	In Force
Rwanda	29 Jun 2018	In Force
Saint Lucia	06 Dec 2000	In Force
San Marino	01 Feb 1995	In Force
Sao Tome and Principe	4 May 2005	In Force
Slovakia	17 Sep 2009	In Force
Slovenia	02 Feb 2006	In Force
Spain	11 Sep 1985	In Force
Suriname	05 Jun 1996	In Force
Sweden	11 Aug 1982	In Force
Switzerland	16 Nov 1983	In Force
Tunisia	11 Feb 2014	In Force
Uganda	27 Mar 1990	In Force
Ukraine	16 May 1994	In Force
Tanzania	14 Aug 1998	In Force
Uruguay	19 Jun 1989	In Force
Uzbekistan	15 Dec 1997	In Force
Zambia	04 Feb 1986	In Force

== See also ==
- Freedom of association
- Freedom of assembly
- Right to Organise and Collective Bargaining Convention
