= Medical Examination (Seafarers) Convention, 1946 =

International Labour Organization Convention

C73
- ILO Convention
- Date of adoption: June 29, 1946
- Date in force: August 17, 1955
- Classification: Admission to Employment
- Subject: Seafarers
- Previous: Paid Vacations (Seafarers) Convention, 1946
- Next: Certification of Able Seamen Convention, 1946

Medical Examination (Seafarers) Convention, 1946 is an International Labour Organization Convention (Number 73).

It was established in 1946, with the preamble stating:

Having decided upon the adoption of certain proposals with regard to the medical examination of seafarers,...

== Revision ==
The principles contained in the convention have been revised and were included in the 2006 Maritime Labour Convention.

== Ratifications ==
As of 2023, the convention has been ratified by 46 states. Of the ratifying states, 35 have subsequently denounced the treaty.
