= Hours of Work and Rest Periods (Road Transport) Convention, 1939 =

International Labour Organization Convention

Hours of Work and Rest Periods (Road Transport) Convention, 1939 (shelved)
C67
- ILO Convention
- Date of adoption: June 28, 1939
- Date in force: March 18, 1955
- This Convention has been "shelved".
- Classification: Hours of Work
- Subject: Working Time
- Previous: Migration for Employment Convention, 1939
- Next: Food and Catering (Ships' Crews) Convention, 1946

Hours of Work and Rest Periods (Road Transport) Convention, 1939 (shelved) is an International Labour Organization Convention.

It was established in 1939, with the preamble stating:

Having decided upon the adoption of certain proposals with regard to the regulation of hours of work and rest periods of professional drivers (and their assistants) of vehicles engaged in road transport,...

== Modification ==
The concepts included in the convention were revised and included in ILO Convention C153, Hours of Work and Rest Periods (Road Transport) Convention, 1979.

== Ratifications ==
Prior to its shelving, the convention had been ratified by four states.
