= Holidays with Pay (Sea) Convention, 1936 =

International Labour Organization Convention

C54
- ILO Convention
- Date of adoption: November 24, 1936
- Date in force: none
- Classification: Conditions of Work
- Subject: Seafarers
- Previous: Officers' Competency Certificates Convention, 1936
- Next: Shipowners' Liability (Sick and Injured Seamen) Convention, 1936

Holidays with Pay (Sea) Convention, 1936 is an International Labour Organization Convention. It never came into force.

It was established in 1936, with the preamble stating:

Having decided upon the adoption of certain proposals with regard to holidays with pay for seamen,...

== Modification ==
The principles contained in the convention were revised in by ILO Convention C72, Paid Vacations (Seafarers) Convention, 1946.

== Ratifications ==
The convention did not receive enough ratifications to be brought into force.
