= USS Device =

World War II US Navy warship

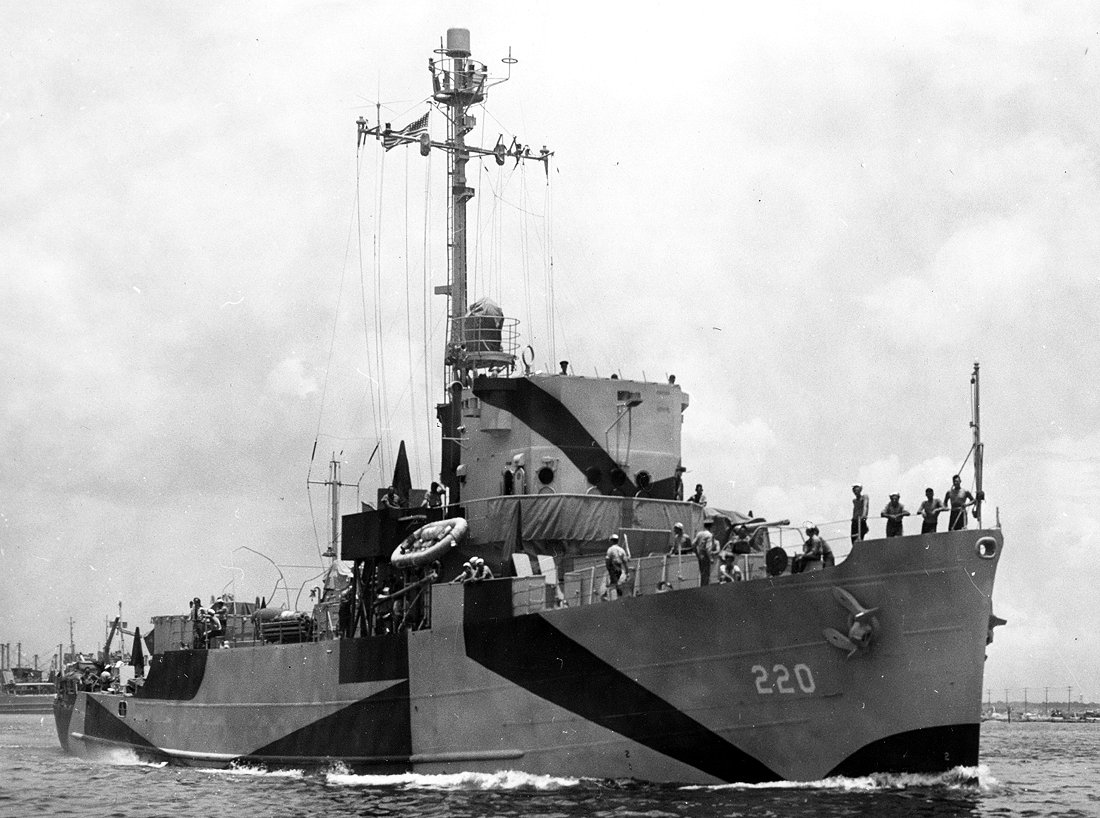
- Device at Tampa, Florida sometime in July 1944.

History

United States
- Name: USS Device (AM-220)
- Builder: Tampa Shipbuilding Company, Tampa, Florida
- Laid down: 1 July 1943
- Launched: 21 May 1944
- Sponsored by: Miss P. K. Kennedy
- Commissioned: 7 July 1944
- Decommissioned: 24 August 1946
- Recommissioned: 16 March 1950
- Decommissioned: 4 February 1954
- Reclassified: MSF-220, 7 February 1955
- Fate: Transferred to Mexican Navy, 1962

History

Mexico
- Name: ARM DM-11
- Acquired: 1962
- Renamed: ARM Cadete Agustín Melgar (C54), 1994
- Namesake: Agustín Melgar
- Stricken: 2000
- Fate: unknown

General characteristics
- Class & type: Admirable-class minesweeper
- Displacement: 650 long tons (660 t)
- Length: 184 ft 6 in (56.24 m)
- Beam: 33 ft (10 m)
- Draft: 9 ft 9 in (2.97 m)
- Propulsion: 2 × ALCO 539 diesel engines, 1,710 shp (1,280 kW); Farrel-Birmingham single reduction gear; 2 shafts
- Speed: 15 knots (28 km/h)
- Complement: 104
- Armament: 1 × 3"/50 caliber (76 mm) DP gun; 2 × twin Bofors 40 mm guns; 1 × Hedgehog anti-submarine mortar; 2 × Depth charge tracks

Service record
- Part of: US Pacific Fleet (1944–1946); Reserve Fleet (1944–1950, 1954–1962); US Atlantic Fleet (1950–1954); Mexican Navy (1962–2000)
- Awards: 3 battle stars

USS Device (AM-220) was an Admirable-class minesweeper built for the United States Navy during World War II. She was awarded three battle stars for service in the Pacific during World War II. She was decommissioned in August 1946 and placed in reserve. Although she did not see service in the war zone, Device was recommissioned in March 1950 during the Korean War and remained in commission until February 1954, when she was placed in reserve again. While she remained in reserve, Device was reclassified as MSF-220 in February 1955 but never reactivated. In October 1962, she was sold to the Mexican Navy and renamed ARM DM-11. In 1994 she was renamed ARM Cadete Agustín Melgar (C54), spelled Augustín Melgar in some sources. She was stricken in 2000, and scuttled for use as an artificial reef in Bahía de Loreto National Park.

== U.S. Navy career ==
Device was launched 21 May 1944 by Tampa Shipbuilding Co., Tampa, Florida; sponsored by Miss P. K. Kennedy; and commissioned 7 July 1944. Device arrived at Pearl Harbor 15 November 1944 after training in the Panama Canal Zone area. Nine days later she got underway to escort a convoy to Eniwetok, then to Kossol Roads, Palau Islands, arriving 24 December. She acted as harbor entrance control vessel and patrolled in the Angaur-Peleliu screen until 9 January 1945 when she escorted convoys between Kossol Roads, Manus, Ulithi, Guam, and Saipan.

Device arrived at Leyte 15 March 1945 and was assigned to escort a group of LSTs and LSMs to Okinawa, arriving the last day of the month. She acted on antisubmarine patrol off the invasion beaches and on 3 April began to sweep mines, taking part in the clearing of Kinmu Wan. When USS Mullany was crashed during the heavy suicide attacks of 6 April Device sped to her side and rescued 16 survivors. The next day she helped YMS-427 extinguish a fire raging on board as a result of the service craft having been struck by shore gunfire. On 8 April PGM-18 and YMS-103 were both struck by mines and Device sent a volunteer whaleboat crew to rescue 21 of the crew of both vessels.

Device continued sweeping mines until 10 April, then patrolled on various antisubmarine stations off Kerama Retto and Ie Shima. From 4 July to 31 July she swept in support of the U.S. 3rd Fleet operation against Japan, then sailed to San Pedro Bay for brief overhaul. Returning to Okinawa 1 September 1945 Device got underway a week later for minesweeping operations in Japanese waters in support of the occupation. She served in the Far East until 20 November when she sailed from Sasebo for Pearl Harbor, arriving 8 December. She remained there for overhaul until 20 January 1946, then sailed for the United States. She arrived at Orange, Texas, 3 June and was placed out of commission in reserve there 24 August. Device received three battle stars for World War II service.

Recommissioned on 16 March 1950 Device stood in to Charleston, South Carolina on 1 April, under the command of Lt. T. J. O'Connor. Subsequent captains included Lt. Philip Roth and Lt. Cary N. Carpenter. She operated from this port along the eastern seaboard and on training exercises in the Caribbean. One operation took her to Quebec, Canada between 3 August and 29 August. On 16 September she arrived at Jacksonville, Florida, and was placed out of commission in reserve at Orange, Texas, 4 February 1954. She was reclassified MSF-220, 7 February 1955. She was sold to Mexico in 1962.

== Mexican Navy career ==
The former Device was acquired by the Mexican Navy in October 1962 and renamed ARM DM-11. In 1994, she was renamed ARM Cadete Agustín Melgar (C54) after Agustín Melgar. (Some sources spell the name Augustín Melgar.) She was stricken in 2000, and sunk as an artificial reef that year south of Puerto Escondido.
