= Dowagiac Municipal Airport =

- IATA: none; ICAO: none; FAA LID: C91

Summary
- Airport type: Public
- Operator: City of Dowagiac
- Location: Dowagiac, Michigan
- Elevation AMSL: 748 ft / 228 m
- Coordinates: 41°59′57″N 86°8′9″W

Map
- Location of airport in Michigan C91 (the United States)

Runways
Direction	Length		Surface
Direction	ft	m	Surface
09/27	4,700	1,433	Asphalt
04/22	2,200	671	Sod

Statistics (2021)
- Aircraft Movements: 3,588
- Based Aircraft: 14

Dowagiac Municipal Airport (FAA LID: C91) is a public airport owned and operated by the City of Dowagiac located 1m (1.6 km) northwest of Dowagiac, Michigan, United States. The uncontrolled airport is used for general aviation purposes. It is included in the Federal Aviation Administration (FAA) National Plan of Integrated Airport Systems for 2017–2021, in which it is categorized as a local general aviation facility.

The airport is used largely by personal pilots, but it also gets significant traffic from crop-dusting aircraft spraying nearby fields. Local officials say the airport helps generate tourism, especially during the summer months.

Additionally, radio-controlled aircraft operations are permitted on the southeast side of runway 04/22.

In 2020, the airport was announced as a finalist to become the hub of Michigan's space launch network, though it was eventually ruled out.

The airport is home to a chapter of the Experimental Aircraft Association (EAA), which hosts pancake breakfasts, fly-ins, and other events at the airport.

The airport is home to a variety of general aviation pilots as well as flight schools that offer flight training year-round.

== Facilities and aircraft ==
The airport has two runways. Runway 9/27 is 4700 x 100 ft (1433 x 30 m) and is asphalt, while runway 4/22 is 2176 x 100 ft (663 x 30 m) and is turf.

The airport received a new terminal which opened in 2017. The building replaced the old facility, which was functional but too old to support the airport and unable to be renovated. Building began in July 2016 and was completed in spring of 2017. 95% of the cost was covered by the Michigan Department of Transportation (MDOT), while the rest was paid for through fees paid for things such as fuel sales, hangar rentals, and other land rentals. The old terminal will remain open to house airport equipment and lighting.

In August 2022, a project was approved to bring the airport new runways lights. The airport received a block grant from the Federal Aviation Administration through the MDOT to subsidize the project.

The airport operates its own FBO, services such as fueling, a pilot planning room with computers, and wifi.

For the 12-month period ending December 31, 2021, the airport has 3,588 aircraft operations, an average of 69 per week. It is all general aviation. For the same time period, 14 airplanes are based on the field: 13 single-engine and 1 multi-engine.

== Accidents & Incidents ==
- On February 18, 2002, a Cessna 172 Skyhawk was substantially damaged while landing at Dowagiac. The pilot attempted two approaches to Runway 27. He went around on the first attempt after falling behind the airplane, and while he considered diverting to another airport, he decided to make another approach. On the second approach, the aircraft departed the right side of the runway, entered an agricultural field, and nosed over. The probable cause of the accident was found to be the pilot's inadequate compensation for the wind conditions that resulted in directional control not being maintained during the landing roll; contributing factors were the pilot's inadequate in-flight decision to attempt the landing with a gusting 20 knot direct crosswind.
- On May 11, 2011, a Beech B24R Sierra crashed during a landing attempt at Dowagiac. The instructor onboard was demonstrating a power-off approach and landing. The first attempt resulted in a go-around because the plane would not have made the runway, but the instructor continued with the second attempt because he felt he would have made the runway even though it would've missed the 1,000 foot markers. The plane again came in low, and the instructor added power when roughly 30 feet from the runway and 10 feet above the ground, but the aircraft touched down in the sod short of the runway, causing the left landing gear to separate from the wing and subsequently the left wing from the fuselage. The probable cause was found to be the flight instructor's failure to maintain the appropriate glidepath and airspeed during the approach, resulting in an aerodynamic stall.
- On August 4, 2018, a Cessna 172 Skyhawk crashed while attempting to take off from Dowagiac. The two aboard received minor injuries. The pilot report that, while the aircraft was 10 feet above the ground after takeoff, the left wing dipped and contacted the ground, causing the airplane to do so as well.

== See also ==
- List of airports in Michigan
