= Medical Care and Sickness Benefits Convention, 1969 =

International Labour Organization Convention

C130
- ILO Convention
- Date of adoption: June 25, 1969
- Date in force: May 27, 1972
- Classification: Medical Care and Sickness Benefit
- Subject: Social Security
- Previous: Labour Inspection (Agriculture) Convention, 1969
- Next: Minimum Wage Fixing Convention, 1970

Medical Care and Sickness Benefits Convention, 1969 is an International Labour Organization Convention. It was established in 1969 revised Convention C24 Sickness Insurance (Industry) Convention, 1927 and Convention C25 Sickness Insurance (Agriculture) Convention, 1927.

== Content ==
=== General provisions ===
==== Article 1 ====
There are several terms and words used in this convention with specific meaning.
The term legislation means any social security rules, laws and regulations.
Prescribed means determined by national legislation.
The phrase industrial undertaking implies all activities in the branches of mining and quarrying, manufacturing, construction, electricity, gas and water, and transport, storage and communication.
Residence means any ordinary residence in the territory of the member and a resident is a person living in the territory of the member.
The term dependent means a state which is assumed to exist in prescribed cases.
The term wife is defined as a wife dependent on her husband and the term child covers children under the age of 15 or who left school. Exceptions are people with chronic illness or infirmity disabling them for any gainful activity, apprentices and students.
Standard beneficiary is defined as a married man and wife with two children.
The term qualifying period means a period of contribution, employment, residence or any combination thereof.
Sickness implies any morbid condition.

==== Article 2 ====
For Articles 1, 11, 14, 20, and 26, a member may request temporary exceptions if medical facilities and economy are inadequate. In doing so, any exception must be justified by the member and limited in time.
Each member agrees, after declaring exceptions, to expand the scope of persons protected, to expand the scope of medical care, and to extend the duration of sickness benefits.

==== Article 3 ====
Each member can, by an additional declaration to the ratification, exempt workers in the agricultural sector from the application of this Convention under certain conditions.
Any member which has made an additional declaration shall submit to the International Labor Organization (ILO) a report on the application and progress of this convention with respect to workers in the agricultural sector.
Any member which has made an additional declaration shall increase the number of protected workers in the agricultural sector as rapidly as circumstances permit.

==== Article 4 ====
Any member can, by an additional declaration to the ratification, exclude from this convention seafarers, sea fishermen, and public service employees.
If an additional declaration has been filed, the member may not include the excluded persons in calculating the figures in Articles 5, 10, 11, 19 and 20.
Any Member which has made an additional declaration may at a later date notify the Director-General of the ILO that it accepts the obligations under this convention in respect of the excluded groups of persons.

==== Article 5 ====
Any member can exclude from the convention casual employees, members of the employer's family who work for and reside with the employer, and other classes of employees, so long as such exclusion does not affect more than 10 percent of the employees.

==== Article 6 ====
For the purposes of this convention, a member can take into account the protection afforded by insurance under official supervision which covers a substantial proportion of male skilled workers or which is in conjunction with the protection arising from this convention.

==== Article 7 ====
Cases covered for protection by this convention or insurance include need for medical treatment for curative or preventive purposes and incapacity for work due to illness.

=== Medical care ===
==== Article 8 ====
Each member provides care to the protected persons for the cure or prevention of the covered cases referred to in Article 7.

==== Article 9 ====
Medical care under Article 8 shall be provided with the intention of restoring or improving the health of the protected persons and their ability to work.

==== Article 10 ====
Under Article 7, all workers and their wives and children, as well as apprentices, are protected.

==== Article 11 ====
If an additional declaration has been made, the group of persons included in Article 7 shall comprise at least 25 percent of all employees together with their wives and children. In addition, groups of employees in industrial establishments constituting at least 50 percent of all employees, together with their wives and children, shall be protected.

==== Article 12 ====
The protected persons under Article 7 also include persons entitled to social security on account of invalidity, old age, death of the person liable for maintenance or unemployment.

==== Article 13 ====
Under Article 8, medical care includes primary care, specialist care in hospitals, pharmaceutical care, hospitalization, dental care, and medical rehabilitation.

==== Article 14 ====
In the case of an additional statement, medical care under Article 8 must include primary care, specialist care, pharmaceutical care, and hospitalization.

==== Article 15 ====
If medical care under Article 8 depends on protected persons fulfilling a waiting period, the conditions shall be fulfilled in such a way that they do not deprive the right to benefits.

==== Article 16 ====
Medical care referred to in Article 8 shall be ensured during the entire quota.
If a beneficiary ceases to be a protected person, the entitlement to medical care may be limited to a prescribed period, which shall not be less than 26 weeks, as long as sickness benefits are not longer.
The period of medical care for illnesses requiring longer treatment shall be extended notwithstanding the prescribed period.

==== Article 17 ====
If a member is required to contribute to the cost of medical care referred to in Article 8, the rules for such contribution must be calculated in such a way as to avoid hardship and not to impair the effectiveness of medical and social protection.

=== Sickness benefit ===
==== Article 18 ====
Each member of this convention shall be obliged to provide sickness benefits to the persons protected under article 7.

==== Article 19 ====
Persons protected under Article 7 include all employees and apprentices, groups constituting at least 75 percent of the total economically active population and all residents who meet the conditions for Article 24.

==== Article 20 ====
In the case of an additional declaration under Article 2, protected persons under Article 7 include groups of employees constituting at least 25 percent of all employees or at least 50 percent of all employees in industrial establishments.

==== Article 21 ====
Sickness benefits under Article 18 must be recurring payments calculated to meet the requirements of Article 22 or Article 23 and, in the case of sickness, the conditions of Article 24.

==== Article 22 ====
In the case of recurrent sickness payments, the benefit rate must be set so that the beneficiary reaches at least 60 percent of the total amount of previous earnings and the amount of family allowances due to a protected person with the same family responsibilities as the standard benefit recipient.
The previous basic earnings of the beneficiary are calculated from the classes to which they previously belonged.
A maximum limit can be prescribed for the benefit rate if it does not exceed the wage of a male worker.
The previous earnings of the beneficiary, wages of the male skilled worker, benefit and family allowance, if any, are calculated on the same time frame.
For the other beneficiaries, the benefit must be in proportion to the benefit for standard beneficiaries.
Male skilled worker means a locksmith or lathe operator in the manufacture of machinery, a person who is considered a typical skilled worker, a person whose annual earnings are equal to or greater than 75 percent of all protected persons, or a person whose earnings are greater than 125 percent of the average earnings.
A typical skilled worker is a person who belongs to the largest major group in the industry and to the department with the largest number of male workers within the establishment.
If the benefit rate differs by area, the male skilled worker can be determined for each area in accordance with Articles 6 and 7.
The wage of the male skilled worker is fixed by collective agreement, domestic legislation or customary law for normal working hours. If the rate varies from region to region, the middle rate is set in accordance with Article 8.

==== Article 23 ====
In the case of recurrent sickness payments, the benefit rate must be calculated so that the recipient under Article 7 receives at least 60 percent of the total amount of remuneration and the amount of family allowances.
In this case, the pay and family allowance is calculated for the same period of time.
For other beneficiaries, the benefit must be in reasonable proportion to the standard benefits.
An ordinary adult male worker shall be deemed to be a person typically engaged in unskilled work in the manufacture of machinery or a person engaged in the field in which most of the male labor force, protected under Article 7, is engaged. For this purpose, the International Standard Industrial Classification of All Economic Activities adopted by the Economic and Social Council of the United Nations at its Seventh Session on 27 August 1948 is used.
If the benefit rate varies by region, the ordinary adult male worker can be determined for each region.
The wage of an ordinary adult worker must be determined on the basis of the collective agreement, national legislation or customary law. In the case of different rates in different areas, the middle rate is used.

==== Article 24 ====
In the case of recurring payment, the benefit rate is determined according to a prescribed scale by the competent public authority.
Such rate can be reduced only to the extent that the other resources of the beneficiary's family exceed the determined amounts.
The total amount of the benefit and other resources after reduction shall ensure the family's subsistence in health and morals and must not be less than the benefit calculated in Article 23.
This is satisfied if the total amount of benefits exceeds by at least 30 percent the amount that would result from Article 23 and Article 19.

==== Article 25 ====
If a protected person is required to fulfill a waiting period under Article 18, the period must be designed in such a way that the protected person does not lose entitlement to benefits.

==== Article 26 ====
In the event of sickness, the benefits provided under Article 18 shall be fulfilled for the entire duration of the sickness and, in the event of incapacity for work, is limited to at least 52 weeks.
If an additional declaration under Article 2 becomes effective, the entitlement to benefits under Article 18 can be limited to at least 26 weeks.
If the right to remuneration is lawfully suspended during the first period of incapacity for work, it must not exceed three days.

==== Article 27 ====
In the event of the death of a person entitled to sickness benefits under Article 18, a death grant shall be paid to the survivors or bearers of the funeral expenses.
A member may derogate from the provision if he has assumed obligations on disability, old-age and survivors' benefits, if he is entitled to at least 80 percent of the work allowance in case of sickness under his legislation, and if he is covered by voluntary insurance providing funeral benefits.

=== Common provisions ===
==== Article 28 ====
A benefit to a protected person can be suspended if the affected person is not in the member's territory; if the person is compensated by a third party entity to the same extent; if the person has committed fraud; if the event was caused by the affected person committing a crime; if the insured event was caused by the affected person's willful misconduct; if the person concerned fails to claim the medical benefits or fails to comply with the requirements without any reason; if the sickness benefits under Article 18 are covered by public funds; and if the person concerned receives cash benefits from another social security higher than the standard benefit in case of sickness under Article 18.
In such cases and within the limits, a part of the benefit due will be paid to the persons entitled to maintenance.

==== Article 29 ====
Every applicant has the right to file a complaint if the quality or quantity of the service is objected to.
If, in the application of this convention, medical care is the responsibility of a state agency, the right of appeal can be reviewed by the competent agency.

==== Article 30 ====
Each member assumes responsibility for the provision of the guaranteed benefits and shall take all necessary measures for this purpose.
Each Member assumes responsibility for the administration of the application of this convention.

==== Article 31 ====
If the administration has been delegated to an agency, representatives of the protected persons, and in some circumstances representatives of employers and representatives of the public, can participate in the administration.

==== Article 32 ====
Each member must assure in its territory to alien and national workers alike the benefits presented.

==== Article 33 ====
A member can, upon the fulfilment of several conditions and after consultation with representative organizations of employers and workers, derogate temporarily from certain provisions of this convention, provided that such derogation does not affect fundamental guarantees of this convention.
Any Member which has made a derogation must indicate in the reports referred to in Article 22 for the ILO the state of its practice and legislation and the progress made towards the application of the provisions of the convention.

==== Article 34 ====
This convention does not apply to insured events which occurred before the entry into force of the convention and to insured events whose benefits relate to periods prior to the entry into force.

=== Final provisions ===
==== Article 35 ====
This convention revises the Sickness Insurance (Industry) Convention, 1927, and the Sickness Insurance (Agriculture) Convention, 1927.

==== Article 36 ====
In accordance with Article 75 of the Social Security (Minimum Standards) Convention, 1952, Articles 18 to 27 and other parts of this convention shall cease to apply from the time this convention becomes binding on a member and no additional declaration under Article 3 is in effect.
If no declaration under Article 3 is in force, the assumption of obligations under the Social Security (Minimum Standards) Convention, 1952 shall apply to the fulfillment of Article 2 from the said convention.

==== Article 37 ====
If the conference accepts a subsequent convention dealing with parts of this convention, the provisions of that convention shall apply to each member, which has ratified it, from the date on which the said convention enters into force.

==== Article 38 ====
Ratifications of this convention are submitted to the Director General by the ILO.

==== Article 39 ====
Once a member has been registered by the Director-General, this convention is binding.
The convention enters into force 12 months after the registration of the first two members.
Thereafter, it enters into force 12 months after the registration of each member.

==== Article 40 ====
After a member is ratified, it can give notice of denunciation ten years after the date of entry into force of this convention. The denunciation takes effect one year after the date of registration.
Any ratified member which does not exercise the right of denunciation is bound by this convention for a further period of ten years.

==== Article 41 ====
The Director-General of the ILO notifies all members of the ILO of all ratifications and denunciations communicated to him.
When notifying the members, the Director-General indicates the date of entry into force of the convention.

==== Article 42 ====
The Director-General of the ILO transmits to the Secretary-General of the UN the complete particulars of all ratifications and denunciations for registration under Article 102 of the Charter of the UN.

==== Article 43 ====
The Governing Body of the ILO submits periodically to the General Conference a report on the implementation and advisability of the convention.

==== Article 44 ====
When the conference adopts a new convention revising in part or in whole the current convention, ratification of the new convention shall entail denunciation of the old convention.
Once the new convention enters into force, the old convention is no longer available to members.
This convention remains in this form for all members who have ratified it but have not ratified the new convention.

==== Article 45 ====
The English and French versions of this convention are equally authoritative.

== Ratifications ==
As of 2022, the convention has been ratified by 16 states.

Country	Date	Status
Belgium	22 Nov 2017	In Force
Bolivia	31 Jan 1977	In Force
Costa Rica	16 Mar 1972	In Force
Denmark	06 Jun 1978	In Force
Ecuador	05 Apr 1978	In Force
Finland	03 Sep 1974	In Force
Germany	08 Aug 1974	In Force
Libya	19 Jun 1975	In Force
Luxembourg	03 Jul 1980	In Force
Netherlands	17 Jan 2006	In Force
Norway	15 Feb 1972	In Force
Slovakia	01 Jan 1993	In Force
Sweden	14 May 1970	In Force
Uruguay	28 Jun 1973	In Force
Venezuela	10 Aug 1982	In Force
