= Siemens C72 =

Mobile phone

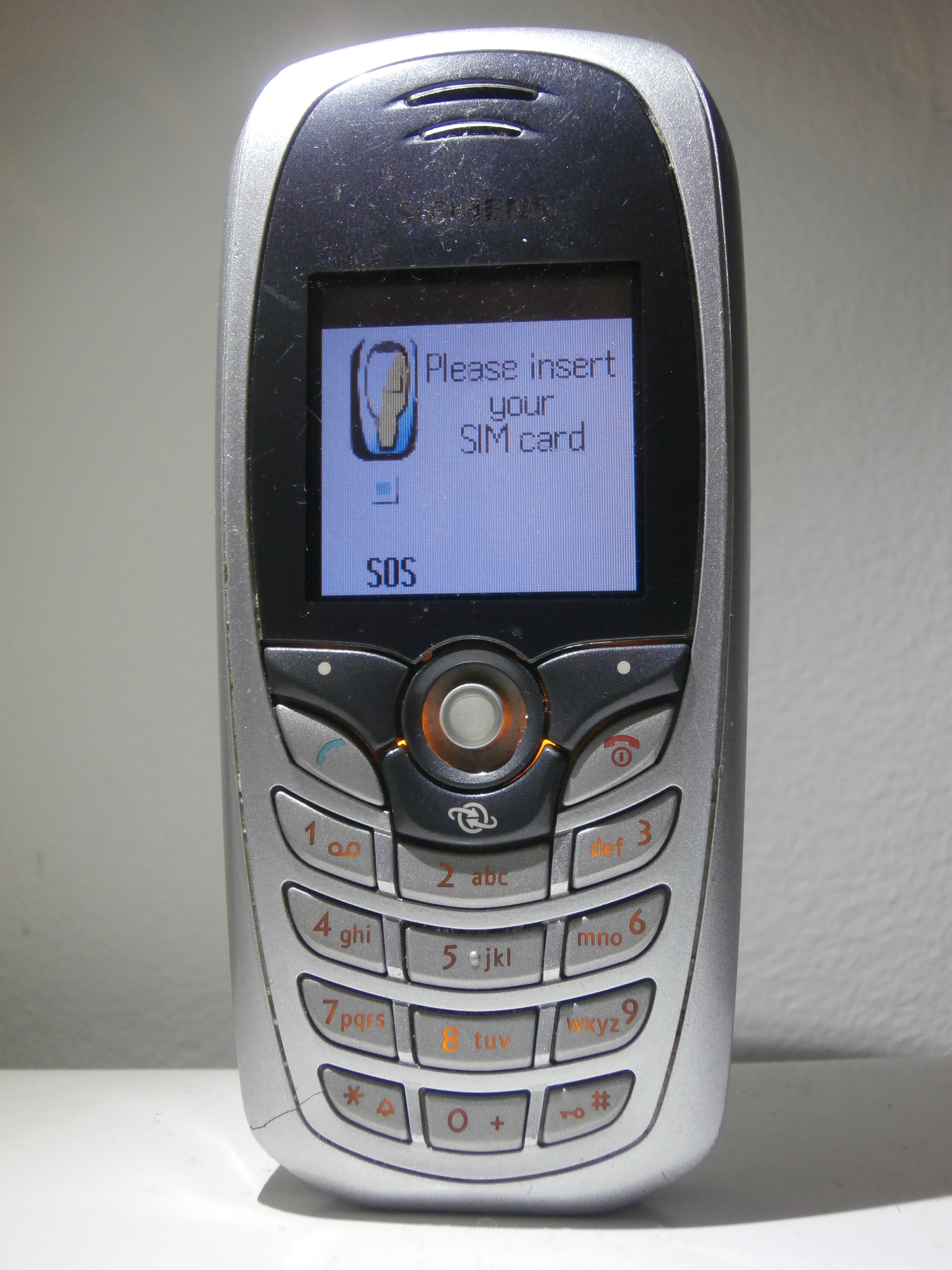
Front view of the Siemens C72

The Siemens C72 is a mobile phone based on the C65. It features a built-in camera capable of taking pictures in VGA resolution (640*480 pixels), but is not capable of recording videos (with possible workarounds).
