= Seafarers' Hours of Work and the Manning of Ships Convention, 1996 =

International Labour Organization Convention

C180
- ILO Convention
- Date of adoption: October 22, 1996
- Date in force: August 8, 2002
- Classification: Seafarers
- Subject: Seafarers
- Previous: Recruitment and Placement of Seafarers Convention, 1996
- Next: Private Employment Agencies Convention, 1997

Seafarers' Hours of Work and the Manning of Ships Convention, 1996 is an International Labour Organization Convention.

It was established in 1996, with the preamble stating:

Recalling the entry into force of the United Nations Convention on the Law of the Sea, 1982, on 16 November 1994, and

Having decided upon the adoption of certain proposals with regard to the revision of the Wages, Hours of Work and Manning (Sea) Convention (Revised), 1958, and the Wages, Hours of Work and Manning (Sea) Recommendation, 1958,...

== Seafarers' Hours of Work and the Manning of Ships Convention and COVID-19 ==
Following the outbreak of COVID-19, the International Labor Organization (ILO), in conjunction with the Seafarers' Hours of Work and the Manning of Ships Convention, called on governments to take all possible measures to protect seafarers and to take steps to reduce the risk of COVID-19 virus infection. The ILO Memorandum was intended to coordinate the vision of the International Maritime Organization (IMO) and the World Health Organization (WHO) to prevent the spread of COVID-19. A joint statement issued by the International Civil Aviation Organization (ICAO), the International Maritime Organization (IMO) and the International Labor Organization (ILO) on May 22, 2020, emphasized the call for key worker status for seafarers. It relieves crews of travel restrictions and make it easier for them to join or leave the ships.

== Ratifications ==
As of 2022, the convention had been ratified by 21 states. However, all have subsequently denounced it.
