= Certification of Ships' Cooks Convention, 1946 =

International Labour Organization Convention

C69
- ILO Convention
- Date of adoption: June 27, 1946
- Date in force: April 22, 1953
- Classification: Certificate of Competency - Training
- Subject: Seafarers
- Previous: Food and Catering (Ships' Crews) Convention, 1946
- Next: Social Security (Seafarers) Convention, 1946

Certification of Ships' Cooks Convention, 1946 is an International Labour Organization Convention (Number 69).

It was established in 1946, with the preamble stating:

Having decided upon the adoption of certain proposals with regard to the certification of ships' cooks,...

== Revision ==
The principles of the convention were revised in the Maritime Labour Convention.

== Ratifications ==
As of 2023, the convention had been ratified by 38 states. Of the ratifying states, 28 have subsequently denounced the treaty.
