= USS Knave =

Minesweeper of the United States Navy

History

United States
- Name: USS Knave (AM-256)
- Builder: American Ship Building Company, Lorain, Ohio
- Laid down: 23 October 1942
- Launched: 13 March 1943
- Sponsored by: Mrs. Geraldine Donohue
- Commissioned: 14 October 1943
- Decommissioned: 1 May 1946
- Reclassified: MSF-256, 7 February 1955
- Stricken: 2 October 1962
- Fate: Transferred to Mexican Navy, 2 October 1962

History

Mexico
- Name: ARM DM-13
- Acquired: 2 October 1962
- Renamed: ARM Cadete Juan Escutia (C56), 1994
- Namesake: Juan Escutia
- Stricken: 2000
- Fate: Sunk as an artificial reef about one half mile off of the coast of Puerto Morales in the Yucatán Peninsula.

General characteristics
- Class & type: Admirable-class minesweeper
- Displacement: 650 long tons (660 t)
- Length: 184 ft 6 in (56.24 m)
- Beam: 33 ft (10 m)
- Draft: 9 ft 9 in (2.97 m)
- Propulsion: 2 × ALCO 539 diesel engines, 1,710 shp (1,280 kW); Farrel-Birmingham single reduction gear; 2 shafts
- Speed: 15 knots (28 km/h)
- Complement: 104
- Armament: 1 × 3"/50 caliber (76 mm) DP gun; 2 × twin Bofors 40 mm guns; 1 × Hedgehog anti-submarine mortar; 2 × Depth charge tracks

Service record
- Part of: U.S. Atlantic Fleet (1943–1946); Atlantic Reserve Fleet (1946–1962); Mexican Navy (1962–2000)

USS Knave (AM-256) was an Admirable-class minesweeper built for the United States Navy during World War II. She served in the Atlantic during World War II and was decommissioned in May 1946 and placed in reserve. While she remained in reserve, Knave was reclassified as MSF-256 in February 1955 but never reactivated. In October 1962, she was sold to the Mexican Navy and renamed ARM DM-13. In 1994, she was renamed ARM Cadete Juan Escutia (C56). She was stricken in 2000, but her ultimate fate is not reported in secondary sources.

== U.S. Navy career ==
Knave was launched 13 March 1943, by American Shipbuilding Co., Lorain, Ohio; sponsored by Mrs. Geraldine Donohue; and commissioned 14 October 1943. Knave sailed for the Virginia Capes 24 October 1943, via the St. Lawrence River arriving Norfolk, Virginia, 24 November.

After a brief period as school ship at Little Creek, Virginia, Knave departed Hampton Roads for Rio de Janeiro via Trinidad, B.W.I., and Recife, Brazil, arriving 11 February 1944. She swept Brazilian waters until 4 April when she began 9 months of escorting convoys between Trinidad and Recife. On 1 January 1945, she got underway for the United States, escorting USS Pleiades (AK-46) and arrived Miami, Florida, 15 January.

After overhaul at Miami, Knave served as school ship at the Naval Training Center, Miami and at Yorktown, Virginia, visiting Charleston, South Carolina, New Haven, Connecticut, and Norfolk, Virginia. Detached from school ship duty 11 February 1948, Knave sailed from Norfolk to Orange, Texas, arriving 21 February.

Knave was decommissioned and was placed in reserve at Orange, Texas, on 1 May 1946. While in reserve, Knave was reclassified MSF-256 on 7 February 1955. Knave was sold to the Mexican Navy on 2 October 1962.

== Mexican Navy career ==
The former Knave was acquired by the Mexican Navy on 2 October 1962 and renamed ARM DM-13. In 1994, she was renamed ARM Cadete Juan Escutia (C56) after Juan Escutia. She was stricken in 2000, but her ultimate fate is not reported in secondary sources. A ship by the same name "Juan Escutia' was scuttled as an artificial reef just off the coast of the Yucatán peninsula near the town Puerto Morelos.
