= Accommodation of Crews Convention (Revised), 1949 =

International Labour Organization Convention

C92
- ILO Convention
- Date of adoption: June 18, 1949
- Date in force: January 29, 1953
- Classification: Safety, Health and Welfare
- Subject: Seafarers
- Previous: Paid Vacations (Seafarers) Convention (Revised), 1949 (shelved)
- Next: Wages, Hours of Work and Manning (Sea) Convention (Revised), 1949

Accommodation of Crews Convention (Revised), 1949 is an International Labour Organization Convention.

It was established in 1949, with the preamble stating:

Having decided upon the adoption of certain proposals with regard to the partial revision of the Accommodation of Crews Convention,...

== Modification ==
This convention is a partial revision of Convention C75 - Accommodation of Crews Convention, 1946, which never came into effect.

== Ratifications ==
As of 2022, 47 states have ratified the convention. Of the ratifying states, 32 have subsequently denounced the convention.

Ratifying countries
| Country | Date | Country | Date | Country | Date | Country | Date |
|---|---|---|---|---|---|---|---|
| Bulgaria | 12/29/1949 | Turkey | 3/17/2009 | Iraq | 12/1/1977 | Montenegro | 6/3/2006 (denounced) |
| Cyprus | 9/19/1995 (denounced) | Netherlands | 6/17/1958 (denounced) | Panama | 6/4/1971 (denounced) | Australia | 6/11/1992 (denounced) |
| Egypt | 8/4/1982 | Ghana | 3/18/1965 (denounced) | Sweden | 7/18/1950 (denounced) | Israel | 8/21/1980 |
| Spain | 7/14/1971 (denounced) | Italy | 6/23/1981 (denounced) | Azerbaijan | 5/19/1992 | Liberia | 6/21/1977 (denounced) |
| Algeria | 10/9/1962 (denounced) | Luxembourg (denounced) | 2/15/1991 | Ireland | 7/21/1952 (denounced) | France (denounced) | 10/26/1951 |
| Romania | 10/11/2000 (denounced) | Ukraine (as the Ukrainian SSR) | 6/17/1970 | Italy | 6/23/1981 (denounced) | Brazil | 6/8/1954 (denounced) |
| Serbia (as the Federal Republic of Yugoslavia) | 11/24/2000 (denounced) | Cuba | 4/29/1952 | Croatia | 8/10/1991 (denounced) | Poland | 4/13/1954 (denounced) |
| Denmark | 9/30/1950 (denounced) | Norway | 6/29/1950 (denounced) | Costa Rica | 6/2/1960 | Guinea-Bissau | 2/21/1977 |
| Equatorial Guinea | 4/23/1996 | United Kingdom | 8/6/1953 (denounced) | Russian Federation (as the Soviet Union) | 11/4/1969 (denounced) | Republic of Moldova | 12/12/2005 |
| Bosnia and Herzegovina | 6/2/1993 (denounced) | North Macedonia | 11/17/1991 | Belgium | 8/30/1962 (denounced) | Belize | 7/15/2005 (denounced) |
| Finland | 12/22/1951 (denounced) | Tajikistan | 11/26/1993 | Germany | 8/14/1974 (denounced) | Angola | 6/4/1976 |
| Greece | 12/2/1986 (denounced) | Slovenia | 5/29/1992 (denounced) | New Zealand | 5/31/1977 (denounced) | Kyrgyzstan | 3/31/1992 |
