= Placing of Seamen Convention, 1920 =

International Labour Organization Convention

C9
- ILO Convention
- Date of adoption: July 10, 1920
- Date in force: November 23, 1921
- Classification: Admission to Employment
- Subject: Seafarers
- Previous: Unemployment Indemnity (Shipwreck) Convention, 1920
- Next: Minimum Age (Agriculture) Convention, 1921

Placing of Seamen Convention, 1920 is an International Labour Organization Convention.

It was established in 1920:

Having decided upon the adoption of certain proposals with regard to the "supervision of articles of agreement; provision of facilities for finding employment for seamen; application to seamen of the Convention and Recommendations adopted at Washington in November last in regard to unemployment and unemployment insurance", ...

== Ratifications ==
As of 2013, the convention had been ratified by 41 states. Of the ratifying states, 15 have subsequently denounced the convention, some by a process that automatically denounces the treaty when the same state ratifies a convention that supersedes the 1920 treaty.
