= Sickness Insurance (Sea) Convention, 1936 =

International Labour Organization Convention

C56
- ILO Convention
- Date of adoption: November 24, 1936
- Date in force: December 12, 1949
- Classification: Social Security
- Subject: Seafarers
- Previous: Shipowners' Liability (Sick and Injured Seamen) Convention, 1936
- Next: Hours of Work and Manning (Sea) Convention, 1936

Sickness Insurance (Sea) Convention, 1936 is an International Labour Organization Convention.

It was established in 1936, with the preamble stating:

Having decided upon the adoption of certain proposals with regard to sickness insurance for seamen,...

== Ratifications ==
As of 2013, the treaty has been ratified by 20 states. 16 of the ratifying states have subsequently denounced the convention.

Country	Date	Status
Egypt	04 Aug 1982	In Force
Mexico	01 Feb 1984	In Force
North Macedonia	17 Nov 1991	In Force
Peru	04 Apr 1962	In Force
