= Food and Catering (Ships' Crews) Convention, 1946 =

International Labour Organization Convention

C68
- ILO Convention
- Date of adoption: June 27, 1946
- Date in force: March 24, 1957
- Classification: Safety, Health and Welfare
- Subject: Seafarers
- Previous: Hours of Work and Rest Periods (Road Transport) Convention, 1939 (shelved)
- Next: Certification of Ships' Cooks Convention, 1946

Food and Catering (Ships' Crews) Convention, 1946 is an International Labour Organization Convention.

It was established in 1946, with the preamble stating:

Having decided upon the adoption of certain proposals with regard to food and catering for crews on board ship,...

== Ratifications ==
As of 2013, the convention has been ratified by 25 states. Of the ratifying states, 19 have subsequently denounced the treaty.
