= Seamen's Articles of Agreement Convention, 1926 =

International Labour Organization Convention

C22
- ILO Convention
- Date of adoption: June 24, 1926
- Date in force: April 4, 1928
- Classification: Admission to Employment
- Subject: Seafarers
- Previous: Inspection of Emigrants Convention, 1926 (shelved)
- Next: Repatriation of Seamen Convention, 1926

Seamen's Articles of Agreement Convention, 1926 was an International Labour Organization Convention, established in 1926, having decided upon the adoption of certain proposals with regard to seamen's articles of agreement.

== Ratifications ==
As of 2023, the convention has been ratified by 60 states, 44 of whom have denounced it.

Country	Date	Status
Colombia	20 Jun 1933	In Force
Cuba	07 Jul 1928	In Force
Dominica	28 Feb 1983	In Force
Egypt	04 Aug 1982	In Force
Iraq	04 Oct 1966	In Force
Japan	22 Aug 1955	In Force
Mauritania	08 Nov 1963	In Force
Mauritania	08 Nov 1963	In Force
Mexico	12 May 1934	In Force
North Macedonia	17 Nov 1991	In Force
Pakistan	31 Oct 1932	In Force
Papua New Guinea	1 May 1976	In Force
Peru	04 Apr 1962	In Force
Sierra Leone	15 Jun 1961	In Force
Somalia	18 Nov 1960	In Force
Uruguay	06 Jun 1933	In Force
Venezuela	20 Nov 1944	In Force
