= Conventions concerning Wages, Hours of Work on Board Ship and Manning =

International Labour Organization

C79/C96 (revised)/C109 (revised)
Conventions concerning Wages, Hours of Work on Board Ship and Manning
- Drafted: 29 June 1946/18 June 1949/14 May 1958
- Effective: not effective
- Condition: 9 countries from a specific group *5 countries with over 1 million gross register tons *aggregate of 15 million gross register tons
- Expiration: 8 August 2002
- Ratifiers: 0/5/11
- Depositary: Director-General of the International Labour Office
- Languages: French and English

The Convention concerning Wages, Hours of Work on Board Ship and Manning (or Wages, Hours of Work and Manning (Sea) Convention) is a convention of the International Labour Organization originally drafted in 1946 and revised conventions in 1949 and 1958, none of which entered into force.

== Entry into Force ==
The criterion of entry into force for all three conventions required a minimum number countries acceding with a significant sea trade volume as well as requirements of the aggregate of trade volume by ratifying countries:

1. ratification by nine countries from the group: Argentina, Australia, Belgium, Brazil, Canada, Chile, China, Denmark, Finland, France, Germany (1958 convention only), Greece, India, Ireland, Italy, Japan (1958 convention only), Netherlands, Norway, Poland, Portugal, Spain (1958 convention only), Sweden, Soviet Union (1958 convention only), Turkey, United Kingdom, United States and Yugoslavia;
2. ratification from at least five countries with over one million gross register tons of shipping;
3. an aggregate tonnage by ratifying countries of more than fifteen million gross register tons.

== Ratifications ==
An overview of number of ratifications of the conferences is shown below. Although the number of ratifications was larger for the revised conventions, the entry into force criteria were met in none of them. The conventions were closed for signature upon the entry into force of the Seafarers' Hours of Work and the Manning of Ships Convention, 1996.

year of conclusion	entry into force	ratifications (current)	relevant countries for entry into force	denouncements	closure for signature
1946	no	0	0	0	8 August 2002
1949	no	5	0	0	8 August 2002
1958	no	11	6	4	8 August 2002

An overview of the ratifications of the conventions as of 27 May 2013 is shown below. Only the 1958 received ratifications from the list of countries of which 9 were required to ratify. Six such ratifications were received (Yugoslavia also ratified, but is depicted in the list as its successor states). Denouncements of the convention were a result of the entry into force of the Seafarers' Hours of Work and the Manning of Ships Convention, 1996 for those countries. Also ratification of the Maritime Labour Convention results -after it enters into force on 20 August 2013- in denouncement of the conventions.

Country	1946	1949	1958	comments
Bosnia and Herzegovina			2 June 1993	Denounced effective 20 August 2013
Brazil		18 June 1965		
Croatia			8 October 1991	Denounced effective 20 August 2013
Cuba		29 April 1952		
France			8 June 1979	denounced 27 April 2004
Guatemala			2 August 1961	
Iraq		15 August 1985	23 September 1986	
Italy			23 June 1981	
Lebanon			6 December 1993	
Macedonia			17 December 1991	
Mexico			11 September 1961	
Norway			30 August 1966	denounced 22 October 2003
Philippines		29 December 1953		Denounced effective 20 August 2013
Portugal			9 January 1981	
Serbia			24 February 2000	Denounced effective 20 August 2013
Slovenia			29 May 1992	denounced 21 July 2004
Spain			14 July 1971	denounced 7 January 2004

== See also ==
- Convention concerning Hours of Work on Board Ship and Manning, a 1936 convention revised by these conventions
- Convention concerning Seafarers' Hours of Work and the Manning of Ships, a 1996 convention which revised these conventions
- Maritime Labour Convention, a 2005 convention revising these conventions (which not entered into effect)
