= Unemployment Indemnity (Shipwreck) Convention, 1920 =

International Labour Organization Convention

C8
- ILO Convention
- Date of adoption: July 9, 1920
- Date in force: March 16, 1923
- Classification: Social Security
- Subject: Seafarers
- Previous: Minimum Age (Sea) Convention, 1920
- Next: Placing of Seamen Convention, 1920

Unemployment Indemnity (Shipwreck) Convention, 1920 is an International Labour Organization Convention.

It was established in 1920:

Having decided upon the adoption of certain proposals with regard to the "supervision of articles of agreement; provision of facilities for finding employment for seamen; application to seamen of the Convention and Recommendations adopted at Washington in November last in regard to unemployment and unemployment insurance",...

== Ratifications ==
As of 2013, the convention has been ratified by 60 states. Of the ratifying states, 45 have subsequently denounced the treaty automatically.
