= Certification of Able Seamen Convention, 1946 =

International Labour Organization Convention

C74
- ILO Convention
- Date of adoption: June 29, 1946
- Date in force: July 14, 1951
- Classification: Certificate of Competency - Training
- Subject: Seafarers
- Previous: Medical Examination (Seafarers) Convention, 1946
- Next: Accommodation of Crews Convention, 1946

Certification of Able Seamen Convention, 1946 is an International Labour Organization Convention.

It was established in 1946, with the preamble stating:

Having decided upon the adoption of certain proposals with regard to the certification of able seamen,...

== Ratifications ==
As of 2022, the convention had been ratified by 29 states. Of these ratifying states, 24 had subsequently denounced the treaty.
