= Repatriation of Seamen Convention, 1926 =

International Labour Organization Convention

C23
- ILO Convention
- Date of adoption: June 23, 1926
- Date in force: April 16, 1928
- Classification: Conditions of Work
- Subject: Seafarers
- Previous: Seamen's Articles of Agreement Convention, 1926
- Next: Sickness Insurance (Industry) Convention, 1927

Repatriation of Seamen Convention, 1926 is an International Labour Organization Convention.

It was established in 1926.

== Ratifications ==
As of 2023, the convention has been ratified by 47 states. Subsequently, 34 ratifying states have automatically denounced the treaty.

== Revision ==
The principles found in the convention were revised in a later ILO treaty, the Repatriation of Seafarers Convention (Revised), 1987.
