= Paid Vacations (Seafarers) Convention, 1946 =

International Labour Organization Convention

C72
- ILO Convention
- Date of adoption: June 28, 1946
- Date in force: none
- Classification: Conditions of Work
- Subject: Seafarers
- Previous: Seafarers' Pensions Convention, 1946
- Next: Medical Examination (Seafarers) Convention, 1946

Paid Vacations (Seafarers) Convention, 1946 is an International Labour Organization Convention.

It was established in 1946, with the preamble stating:

Having decided upon the adoption of certain proposals with regard to holidays with pay for seafarers,...

The treaty has never been brought into force.

== Modification ==
The principles contained in the convention were subsequently revised and included in the ILO Convention C91, Paid Vacations (Seafarers) Convention (Revised), 1949 (shelved).

== Ratifications ==
The convention has not been brought into force and is not binding upon any country that ratified it.

Country	Date	Notes
Algeria	November 19, 1962	denounced September 14, 1967
Bulgaria	December 29, 1949	
Cuba	January 13, 1954	denounced September 14, 1967
Finland	August 23, 1949	denounced September 14, 1967
France	December 9, 1948	denounced September 14, 1967
