= Paid Vacations (Seafarers) Convention (Revised), 1949 (shelved) =

International Labour Organization

C91
- ILO Convention
- Date of adoption: June 18, 1949
- Date in force: September 14, 1967
- This Convention has been "shelved".
- Classification: Conditions of Work
- Subject: Seafarers
- Previous: Night Work of Young Persons (Industry) Convention (Revised), 1948
- Next: Accommodation of Crews Convention (Revised), 1949

Paid Vacations (Seafarers) Convention (Revised), 1949 (shelved) is an International Labour Organization Convention.

It was established in 1949, with the preamble stating:

Having decided upon the adoption of certain proposals with regard to the partial revision of the Paid Vacations (Seafarers) Convention, 1946,...

== Modification ==
The concepts contained in this convention were revised and included in ILO Convention C146, Seafarers' Annual Leave with Pay Convention, 1976.

== Ratifications ==
Prior to it being shelved, the convention had been ratified by five states.
