= Hours of Work and Manning (Sea) Convention, 1936 =

International Labour Organization Convention

C57: Hours of Work and Manning (Sea) Convention, 1936
Convention concerning Hours of Work on Board Ship and Manning
- Drafted: 24 October 1936
- Effective: not brought into force
- Condition: 5 ratifications
- Expiration: 8 August 2002
- Ratifiers: 3 (of which 2 denounced)
- Depositary: Director-General of the International Labour Office
- Languages: French and English

The Convention concerning Hours of Work on Board Ship and Manning or Hours of Work and Manning (Sea) Convention, 1936 is an International Labour Organization Convention which never entered into force. It was established in 1936, and closed for ratification on 24 February 2002, when the 1996 Convention concerning Seafarers' Hours of Work and the Manning of Ships entered into force.

== Revisions ==
The convention was revised by the Convention concerning Wages, Hours of Work on Board Ship and Manning of 1946 as well as its 1949 and 1958 revision, none of which entered into force. The entry into force of the 1996 Convention concerning Seafarers' Hours of Work and the Manning of Ships (which also revised the convention) in 2002 signified the end of the opening for signature of the convention.

== Ratifications ==
The convention was ratified by three countries, but automatically denounced by two upon entry into force of the 1996 Convention for those countries. The convention is not legally binding upon any state.

Country	Date	Denunciation
Belgium	11 April 1938	10 June 2003
Bulgaria	29 December 1949	24 February 2003
United States	29 October 1938	
