= Migrant workers in the Gulf Cooperation Council region =

Foreign workers in six Arab states of the Persian Gulf

Foreign workers crowding the exit of the Qatar Petroleum District Project in Doha, 2015

Migrant workers in the Gulf Cooperation Council region involves the prevalence of migrant workers, especially South Asian migrants, in Bahrain, Kuwait, Oman, Qatar, Saudi Arabia and the United Arab Emirates. Together, these six countries form the Gulf Cooperation Council (GCC) (مجلس التعاون الخليجي), established in 1981. The GCC cooperates on issues related to economy and politics, and the subject of migrant workers constitutes a substantial part of the council's collaboration. All of the GCC countries are dependent on migrant labor to bolster and stimulate economic growth and development, as the GCC countries possess an abundance of capital while the domestic labor capacity is low. Although migrant workers in the Persian Gulf region amount to no more than 10% of all migrants worldwide, they constitute a significant part of the populations of their host countries.

Globally, all six GCC countries rank among the twenty with greatest noncitizen percentage of resident population. Both Saudi Arabia and the UAE are among the top ten countries accommodating the largest noncitizen populations in the world, occupying fourth and fifth place respectively. In Bahrain, Kuwait, Qatar and the UAE, the majority of the population comprises noncitizen laborers and in the latter two countries this proportion is as high as 80%. Furthermore, 95% of the workers active in the domestic and construction sectors are migrant workers. As of 2013, it was estimated that approximately 18 million legal migrants resided in the GCC region. Over the last few years the number of migrants residing in the GCC has increased considerably. The Gulf Research Center defines non-nationals as individuals having citizenship of a country outside the GCC region or lacking any recognized citizenship.

== History ==
The history of migration to the GCC countries can be categorized into three waves.

=== First wave ===
The first wave of migration to the GCC region occurred prior to the 1820 British arrival in the so-called Trucial States of modern-day Qatar, Bahrain and the UAE. The oldest known maritime trading route was between the Indus Valley civilisation and Dilmun in modern-day Bahrain. Traders often stayed in the Persian Gulf region for an extended period of time before returning to their port of origin. During the first wave, migrants mainly came from Asia and settled on the eastern shores of the Persian Gulf. Migration was often the result of trade relations between the Gulf and Asia. Migration was mainly undertaken by people from modern-day Iran and India who traveled to the Gulf. Most trading goods were exported to the Persian Gulf, while only a limited amount of goods was exported in the other direction. Pearls were the exception and the main trading product in places like Qatar, Abu Dhabi and Dubai. Scholars such as Muhammad Azhar point out the longstanding relationship between Indians and the Persian Gulf, where many stayed for generations and even became citizens.

=== Second wave ===
The second wave may be defined as the migration which took place after the British arrived in the Persian Gulf region in 1820. The British conflict with the Al Qasimi family, who held control over the Strait of Hormuz, started with the British refusal to pay toll for British ships passing through the Strait. Conflict broke out and the Qawasim fleet was destroyed. Pax Britannica was applied to the whole region, which included a series of treaties imposed on the region's leaders and which further cemented the position of Great Britain as the dominant power in the region. The British took control over the region and created the structures needed for increased trade. The British interest in the Persian Gulf region is often explained by the fact that Great Britain wanted to protect the sea route to India from rival colonial powers. The East India Company played an important role in this endeavour. Britain made Abu Dhabi a protectorate in 1820 and established control over Aden in 1839. Thereafter Great Britain gained power over Bahrain, Dubai, Kuwait, Oman and Qatar. The power of the British in the Gulf region, combined with the structures put in place to promote trade, strengthened the relationship between the Persian Gulf region and India further. This, in turn, advanced migration from India to the Persian Gulf, especially Indian civil servants who would manage the relations between the Gulf and India. Based on the works of J.G. Lorimer (1908) and Al-Shaybani (1962), the population of migrants in Qatar before the 1930s can be classified as Arabs, Persians, Baluchis, Indians, and Africans. Many of these communities are in fact economic migrants who came to Qatar to seek better opportunities in the pearl industry. The Hawalas, or Arabs who returned from Persia due to persecution of Sunnis play important roles in the pearl industry as craftsmen, merchants, and sailors. Indian merchant communities, albeit few in numbers, controlled imports such as foodstuff and functioned as economic middlemen between wealthy sheikhs who sourced pearls and European buyers. The Baluchis also migrated to Qatar to work as laborers and mercenaries or bodyguards whilst African slaves were brought from the Eastern coast of Africa to work in the pearl diving industry. These economic migrants not only play an important role in the development of the economy of the Gulf states before the discovery of oil, but they also have important influence on the culture of the region. In music, dance, and other areas, African beliefs and customs have considerable impact on the cultural typography of the Gulf states. The dialect of the Gulf countries also adopted many Persian terms and architectural styles.

=== Third wave ===
The third wave took off due to rapid economic growth related to the intensified hydrocarbon exploration in the region. This led to the discovery of large quantities of crude oil. Although oil had already been discovered in GCC region during the beginning of the 20th century, the economic benefits of the oil resources were properly actualised during the 1960s and 1970s, as the GCC countries officially gained independence from the United Kingdom in 1971. The author Al Shehabi further argues that a capitalist approach to the economy became increasingly more dominant in the GCC region during this time period. Together with the oil boom, it constituted an important factor explaining the importation of migrant workers and economic development.

The third wave of migration in the GCC can be attributed to the 1960s but intensified during the 1970s, as the increased wealth of the states led to plans of industrialization and modernization. The implementation of these plans increased labor demands, but the GCC countries and their populations did not possess the manpower or knowledge to meet these demands. The relatively small populations in the GCC countries, as well as limited numbers of female workers and male workers of the appropriate age, combined with a plenitude of foreign workers willing to migrate, constitute important "pull" and "push" factors which explain the migration growth of the 1970s. While seven of the Trucial States decided to unite and form the United Arab Emirates after gaining independence from the United Kingdom, an initiative taken by Zayed bin Sultan Al Nahyan of Abu Dhabi and Rashid bin Saeed Al Maktoum of Dubai, both Qatar and Bahrain decided to found their own independent states.

During the 1980s and 1990s, while the inflow of foreign workers remained steady, the demographic composition of these migration flows changed. While the initial part of the third wave mainly brought Arab migrant workers to the Persian Gulf region, their numbers declined during the 1980s and 1990s as they were replaced with Southeast Asian migrants. In comparison, there were approximately 2.000.000 migrant workers in the oil-producing countries, of which 68% were Arab workers, while in 1983 the total number of migrant workers had risen to 5.000.000, of which only 55% were Arab migrants. More specifically, in Saudi Arabia the number of Arab migrant workers decreased from 90% to 32% between 1975 and 1985. This change in composition was caused by a change in attitude towards Arab foreign workers. At first, the shared language, religion and culture were seen as benefits by the GCC states. Nevertheless, the rise of Pan-Arabism in the region heightened authorities' fears of political activism and anti-government activities by Arab migrants. Furthermore, the authorities feared that the often low-educated Arab migrants would corrupt the culture of the Arab states of the Persian Gulf. Thus Asia, and specifically India, became the obvious solution for the GCC countries, considering the historical ties, the geographical proximity and the abundance of workers willing to migrate to the Gulf region. All in all, the third wave has resulted in that more than 50% of the workforce in any of the GCC countries consists of migrant workers.

== Demographics ==
=== Bahrain ===
Bahrain differentiates itself from other GCC countries. In 2013 the majority of Bahraini citizens were employed in the private sector (63%). However, most migrant workers are also employed in the private sector (78.5%). A smaller number (20%) are employed in the domestic sector. Approximately 80% of the non-Bahraini residents are men with a low level of education: 82.5% of non-Bahrainis have not finished secondary education. Non-Bahraini residents mainly work in construction (27.9%), wholesale and retail (16.3%), domestic work (16%) and manufacturing (12.4%).

In 2013, approximately 80% of all non-Bahraini nationals held some sort of employment, comprising 77% of the Bahraini workforce. In the private sector, non-nationals constituted up to 81% of the employees. Non-nationals occupy low-level positions in areas such as construction work and domestic household work, while non-Bahraini Arabs tend to hold higher status jobs, such as manager positions. As of 2013, 85% of the non-Bahraini residents were from Asian countries and 50% of the Asian migrants were of Indian origin.

In 2014, 84.4% of the non-nationals were from Asia, and 49.4% came from India.

In 2015, 51.1% of residents in Bahrain were foreign citizens. The amount of non-nationals peaked in 2010, when they constituted 54% of the population. In that same year, approximately 45.5% of the Bahraini residents were Asian migrants, while non-Bahraini Arabs constituted 4.7% of the total population and 1% of the population was European.

=== Kuwait ===
Of the 2,611,292 non-Kuwaitis residing in Kuwait in 2012, 1,864,139 were employed. The large majority worked in the private sector (63%), in contrast to Kuwaiti citizens who were predominantly active in the public sector. Of the total workforce in the private sector, migrant workers made up 93.4% of the total workforce in the Kuwaiti private sector. Most migrant workers were male (65.3%), while 70% of them had not completed secondary education. The average age of migrant workers was 32.8 years old, and they worked either in private households (29%), wholesale and retail (14.8%), construction work (9.9%) or manufacturing (6.1%).

Most migrant workers in Kuwait were of Asian origin and the largest group consisted of Indian nationals, who constituted 30% of the non-Kuwaiti residents in 2012. Approximately 80% of the foreign residents were active laborers, and made up 83% of the workforce. In the private sector, non-Kuwaitis constituted over 90% of the workforce. Foreign nationals from Arab countries tended to hold higher positions with more responsibility, such as manager positions. Asian migrant workers generally worked in crafts or service sectors. Kuwait had a large proportion of Palestinian migrant workers prior to the First Gulf War. The Palestinians had to leave the country once the war was over, as they were accused of supporting Saddam Hussein. Additionally, the Bedoon ethnic minority have gradually been compelled to leave the country since the middle of the 1980s. The ones who still reside in Kuwait are considered to be stateless.

=== Oman ===
Migration to Oman has increased rapidly since 2000 due to economic growth, which further has resulted in development of infrastructure. After the economic crisis in 2008 the numbers of migrants continued to increase, consequently diverging from the general trend in other GCC countries where the numbers of migrants were decreasing. In 1993, the population constituted 2,017,643 people, of which 26.5% were foreign residents. In 2015, 44.2% (1,849,412 people) of the total Omani population (4,187,516 people) were non-Omanis. This constituted an upsurge of migrants since the second Omani census in 2003, when noncitizen residents were estimated to account for about 24% of the total populace. In 2013, the majority of migrant workers came from India, Pakistan and Bangladesh (87%). 82% of all migrant workers were employed in the private sector. However, in 2013 the Shura Council of Oman established that the inflow of migrant workers should not surpass 33% of the total populace. Further, the Omani leadership carried out extensive deportations of undocumented migrants in 2010, resulting in the return of approximately 70.000 people to their respective countries of origin. At the time of the deportations, Omani authorities estimated that there were approximately 200,000 undocumented migrants in the country.

Migrants from the Middle East are generally located in occupations representing the higher strata of society, in comparison to the average Asian migrant. There is also a recognizable distinction between Middle Eastern and Asian migrants concerning the phenomenon of family reunification. While the former group often can bring family members with them, the latter group generally do not have this possibility.

=== Qatar ===
Qatar's population has increased by 6.2% annually between 1986 and 2013. While Qatari citizens have increasingly fewer children, the main factor contributing to the population growth is migration. Between 2005 and 2015, the population growth intensified after a period of slower growth and increased with 15.3%. In 2013, the total population was expected to be 2,003,700 people, 85.7% of which were foreign residents. Furthermore, foreign residents made up 94.1% of the workforce in the country and approximately 80% of the migrants were estimated to be male. Qatar also had the second highest GDP per capita in 2013, sustaining the cost of migrants coming to the country. However, the labor camps used for over 50% of all residents in Qatar are also home to many Qataris. As demographic statistical data for nationals and non-nationals are not available separately, it is only possible to present the demographics of the total population.

Approximately 80% of all Qatari citizens are employed within white collar work. Non-Qataris dominate all work sectors in the country, from manager positions to unskilled labor. The large majority of migrant workers are employed in the construction sector. Migrants mainly come to Qatar from Nepal, India, Bangladesh and Pakistan.

=== Saudi Arabia ===
Saudi Arabia has one of the fastest growing populations in the world. The majority of migrant workers in Saudi Arabia come from South Asia. Although migrants constitute 33% of the total population, they represent 56.5% of the total number of employees and 89% of the employees active in the private sector. While over half of the Saudi citizens worked in the public sector, 99% of the non-Saudi population worked in the private sector. As of 2013, approximately 74% of foreign nationals are male and 62.3% had not finished secondary education. Moreover, approximately 80% of foreign nationals are between the ages of 15 and 64. The most common employment for non-nationals is construction (26.5%), retail and wholesale (22.3%), as well as domestic work (15%). Non-nationals can also be found in the health and education sectors. While the majority of migrant workers are to be found in low income jobs, mostly involving physical labour, the majority of managers and specialists are also of non-Saudi origin.

In terms of remittances, India, Egypt and Pakistan are the main beneficiaries of national citizens working in Saudi Arabia. The data is incomplete but the Gulf Research Center suggests that these nationalities probably constitute the majority of migrant workers in the country.

=== United Arab Emirates (UAE) ===
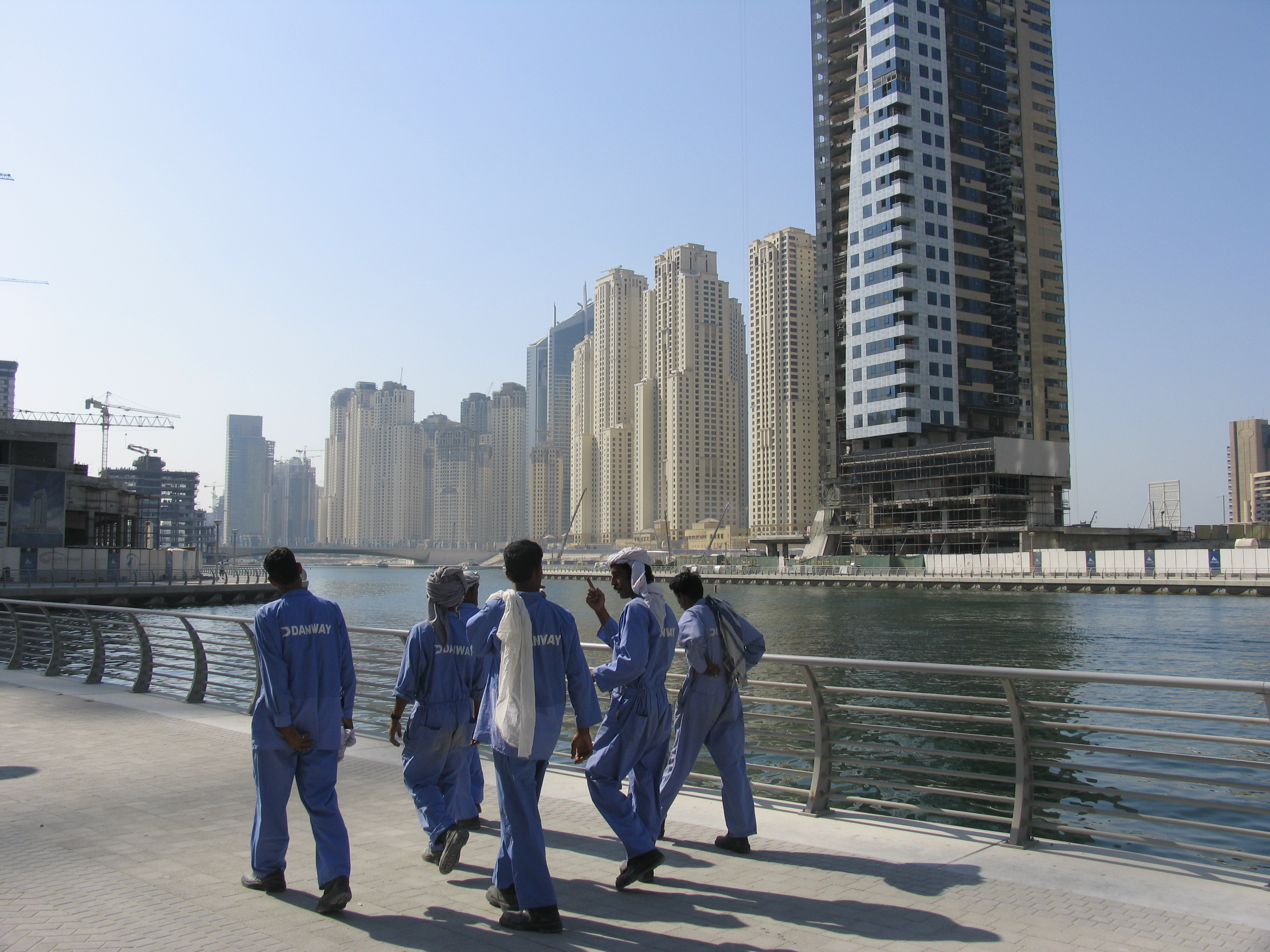
Migrant construction workers in Dubai

The data provided by the federal and emirate-level statistical bureaus is limited in comparison to the other GCC countries. The number of migrants in the UAE has increased rapidly: between 2007 and 2008 the number increased by 30%. In 2010, non-nationals made up 88.5% of the total population. In the same year, foreign residents further made up 96% of the country's workforce. The majority of non-nationals were from Asia, especially from India, Bangladesh and Pakistan. The majority of migrant workers could be found in the private sector, where they constituted 99.5% of the workforce. Migrant workers also held 40% of the jobs in the public sector. Employment possibilities in the UAE attracted both high, medium and low-skilled workers and, compared to other GCC countries, migrants generally held higher positions, such as manager-positions.

== Government policies ==
Starting in the 1980s, Persian Gulf countries have implemented policies focused on nationalisation of the workforce and limiting the influx of foreign labor - so-called "Gulfization policies". These policies were adopted because of the perceived threat that a large number of migrants posed, combined with high levels of unemployment of nationals. Over the years, these policies have been adjusted and amended to provide a better fit to the situation at hand. These policies have focused both on the supply of foreign labor and the demand of foreign labour. Examples of the former include increasing the costs of living, for example through indirect taxes, cracking down on migrant workers illegally residing in the GCC countries, and restricting visa and work permit rules and visa trading. Examples of policies limiting the demand for foreign labour include financial incentives for employers to hire nationals, training and schooling of nationals, increasing the costs of hiring migrant workers, excluding migrant workers from certain specific sectors and placing quotas on the employment of nationals and migrant workers.

These policies have been criticised and their effectiveness has been questioned. With regard to the public sector, the implementation of quotas was argued to present its own problem: the large-scale reliance of nationals on employment in the public sector. Nevertheless, this problem has solved itself in most GCC states, except Kuwait, even though the segment of portion employed in the public sector remains disproportionally high. In the private sector, some employers refuse to comply with the policies and it has been argued that some sectors, for example the construction industry, are not able to function successfully without migrant workers. Additionally, in some states, unemployment rates have remained high for nationals.

== Remittances ==
The GCC countries are among the top remittance sending countries in the world. In 2013, 23% of all remittances globally were sent from the GCC region. The total official value was estimated to be approximately US$90 billion. In 2016, Saudi Arabia was second on the list of remittance sending countries and other GCC member states were also among the top countries concerning outflows of remittances. The estimated value of remittances sent from Saudi Arabia annually is expected to be around US$16 billion. India, Egypt and Pakistan are the main beneficiaries of national citizens working in Saudi Arabia. The data is incomplete, but the Gulf Research Center suggests that these nationalities probably constitute the majority of migrant workers in the country. It is further estimated that outflows of remittances through informal channels are a common phenomenon.

Groups of migrant workers are composed of a variety of nationalities, but are generally united by the fact that the large majority send money to family members and relatives in their respective countries of origin. Migrants in the GCC countries are generally denied the right to own property and bring family members with them to the country of employment. These factors generally contribute to migrants' intentions not to stay in the country of employment for the entirety of their life. However, the work conducted by migrants in the GCC constitutes an important section of the economy in the country of origin, as money is sent home to family members and relatives. India receives approximately half of all remittances from Indian migrants in the GCC countries and further constitutes the country sending most migrants to the region.

Several state leaders in the GCC regard remittances as an economical “leakage”, as economic capital is leaving the country. Due to the value of remittances, GCC countries have recently started to discuss remittance taxes as a strategy to counterbalance budget deficits. The International Monetary Fund recently warned the GCC to be ready for profit decrease, as oil prices might go down. Consequently, tax extraction from migrants may be used to compensate for future economic predicaments. Saudi Arabia, the largest country among the GCC countries, currently has a budget deficit of 38,6 billion USD. Oman is especially sensitive to declining oil prices and economic change, as about 70% of the economy is dependent on natural resources. A leading representative of the Consultative Assembly of Oman (Majlis al-Shura) has expressed the essentiality to “tighten our belts and prepare together for the coming challenges. The honeymoon is over!” However, according to financial experts, it is doubtful whether taxation of remittances will lead to any economic betterment. While leaders in the GCC might moderate the economic situation in the short-run, the long-term consequences of remittance taxation are far from certain.

== Legal regimes ==
=== International legal regime ===
Although the six countries are all members of the International Labour Organization, none of these countries are members of the International Organization for Migration even though Bahrain, Qatar and Saudi Arabia are observer states. Furthermore, none of the six states have signed the most important conventions on the protection of the rights of migrant workers, namely the 1949 Migration for Employment Convention, the 1975 Migrant Workers Convention (Supplementary Provisions), and the 1990 International Convention on the Protection of the Rights of All Migrant Workers and Members of Their Families. Of the so-called eight fundamental conventions of the International Labour Organization, Bahrain has ratified five conventions, Kuwait has ratified seven conventions, Oman has ratified four conventions, Qatar has ratified five conventions, Saudi Arabia has ratified six conventions and the UAE have also ratified six conventions. All have ratified the 1930 Forced Labour Convention, and the 1957 Abolition of Forced Labour Convention.

=== National legal regimes ===
==== Kafala system ====
An important concept which regulates migrant labor in the GCC countries is the kafala system, a sponsorship system which provides the legal basis for both residency and employment of migrant workers in the GCC countries. It relies on a citizen or organization, the kafeel (sponsor) within one of the GCC countries employing migrant workers, which is the only manner in which the migrant worker can receive an entry visa, residence permit and work permit. Furthermore, under the kafala system, the sponsor takes on both legal and economic responsibility for the migrant worker. This system binds the migrant worker to the employer, as the migrant is allowed only to work for the kafeel and only for the duration of the contract. The kafala system remains an important part of the laws regulating migrant workers in all of the Gulf states, even though many of these laws have been amended in Arab states of the Persian Gulf during the past 15 years.

==== National laws and regulations ====
===== Bahrain =====
In 2009, Bahrain announced that it would end the kafala system, citing human rights concerns linked to both human trafficking and sexual slavery. The Labour Market Regulatory Law was amended, making the LMRA the official sponsor of migrant workers and, most importantly, allowing migrant workers to leave their employer without the latter's consent. In December 2016, the Bahraini government announced the official and total abolition of the sponsorship system once more.

Other legislative initiatives to protect labor rights in Bahrain include a 2012 private sector labor law, focusing inter alia on the number of sick days, annual leave, compensation for unfair dismissals, fines for labor law violations and the streamlining of labor disputes. A 2008-human trafficking law was presented by the Bahraini government as covering many common labor law violations, for example the withholding of wages. Furthermore, in late 2016 Bahrain was considering to allow the issuance of flexible work permits for undocumented workers, providing them with the ability to work for more than one employer even without legal visa.

===== Kuwait =====
Since its creation in 2006 the Bahraini Labour Market Regulation Authority (LMRA) is tasked, not only with the regulation of, inter alia, employment transfers, recruitment agencies and work visas, but also with informing migrant workers of their rights and obligations. Furthermore, the existing legal regime regarding labor is applicable to both national and foreign workers. The protections offered by Bahrain's criminal law to workers applies to migrant workers as well.

The main legal source for the kafala system in Kuwait is the 1959 Aliens’ Residence Law and its implementing regulations. This law not only provided that all foreign workers should have a local sponsor, but also that the responsibility of monitoring the foreign workers lies with the sponsor. Furthermore, migrant workers were also covered the 1964 Law concerning Labour in the Private Sector, the sector in which most foreign workers are active. The legal system regulating foreign workers has been changing since the early 2000s. For example, in 2007, the Kuwaiti Ministry of Labor and Social Affairs implemented a decree which prohibited employers from taking their employees’ passports. In 2009, another decree was issued, which allowed migrant workers to change employers without the employer's consent. However, this would only be a possibility after the initial employment contract was completed, or after the worker had been employed for three consecutive years.

In 2010, the Kuwaiti Minister of Social Affairs and Labor announced that it would abolish the kafala system, requesting the assistance of the ILO on policy issues related to migrant workers. New labor laws were implemented in 2010. One major change was the creation of an agency, the Public Authority for Manpower (PAM), which has the sole responsibility for the importation and employment of foreign workers. The agency also works to prevent the practice of visa trading, in which sponsors or local agencies would charge potential migrant workers large sums for work visas in exchange for employment, without providing the migrant with actual employment. Additionally, the new labor laws placed limits on daily working hours, while also providing for end-of-service payments, paid maternity leave and access to labor dispute settlement mechanisms. The 2010 laws also incorporated the 2009 ministerial decree regarding the possibility to change employers into actual law, while maintaining the requirements of the 2009 decree. However, the new laws did not set a minimum wage requirements, did not allow for the creation of labor unions and did not cover domestic workers.

In 2015, the Ministry of Labor and Social Affairs of Kuwait approved a standardized labor contract for foreign workers in the private sector, issued by the PAM, which specifies end-of-contract compensation, holidays and leaves. The standardized contract allows for additional articles to be added as long as these extra articles comply with Kuwait's labor laws. Furthermore, the government distributed copies of this standardized contract among embassies for translation. In the same year, the government adopted new labor laws which extended labor rights to domestic workers and in 2016 the government set a minimum wage for domestic work.

===== Oman =====
In Oman, the kafala system is regulated by the foreign residency law and accompanying laws, while the system is enforced by the Ministry of Manpower and the Royal Oman Police. According to Oman's 2003 Labour Law, an employer needs a permit issued by the Ministry of Manpower in order to import foreign workers. Furthermore, migrant workers are prohibited from working for another employer. The Labour Law places responsibility for the migrant worker on the employer. The 2003 Law also sets conditions for the labor contract, as well as the rights and obligations of both employers and migrant workers, including the provision of medical facilities, suitable means of transport, and a minimum wage by the Council of Ministers. In addition, if a migrant worker wishes to change employers, the employee needs to receive a No Objection Certificate from the employer.

In 2011, Oman reportedly informed the United Nations Human Rights Council that alternatives to the kafala system were being considered. However, the sponsorship system still remains in place today. Legislative amendments to the Omani labor laws were under consideration in late 2016. The Ministry of Manpower also announced in 2016 the abolition of the obligatory No Objection Certificate.

===== Qatar =====
In Qatar before 2009, the entry, residence and employment of foreigners was regulated by different consecutive laws, dating back to 1963. In 2009 these laws were merged into one so-called “sponsorship law”, the Law No. 4 Regulating the Entry, Exit, Residence & Sponsorship of Foreigners. Both the 2009 Sponsorship Law and the laws that preceded the Sponsorship Law were codifications of the kafala system. The 2009 law provided that migrant workers could only receive residence permits without sponsorship in very limited circumstances, that migrant workers are only allowed to work for the employer which sponsored them and that sponsorships can only be transferred by the Minister of Interior in case of labor disputes or when abuse of the employee could be proven. The law additionally required employers to provide employees with exit permits if they wished to leave Qatar either temporarily or permanently, but also forced employers to return passports to employees once the residency procedure is completed.

In May 2014, Qatar announced its intentions to reform the labor laws and to abolish the kafala system. A new law, titled Law No. 21 on the Entry, Exit and Residency of Foreign Nationals replacing the 2009 Sponsorship Law, was adopted in 2015 and entered into force in December 2016. The aim of the new law was enhancing the rights and protection of migrant workers, although the law has been criticized for insufficiently enhancing migrant worker protection. According to Amnesty International, the new law still requires migrant workers to obtain their employer's permission to change employment or to leave Qatar. Furthermore, even after completion of the labor contract, the migrant worker wishing to find employment elsewhere in Qatar will need permission from “the competent authority”, as well as from the Ministry of Labor and Social Affairs, without the law specifying who is meant by the competent authority. The law also prohibits migrant workers from establishing labor unions or organizing strikes. Additionally, in 2015, the Qatari government announced its plan to set up an electronic contract system, in which workers can find their labor contract which would be available in ten different languages.

In January 2020, Qatar ended the 'kafala' sponsorship system with reforms and the removal of exit permit requirements for most workers. The measures, which became law on August 30, 2020 (Law No. 18 of 2020 and Law No. 17 of 2020), allowed migrant workers to change jobs before end of their contract without obtaining a No Objection Certificate (NOC) from employer, and established a monthly minimum wage of 1,000 Qatari riyal (roughly US$275).

In September 2020, UN human rights experts praised Qatar's efforts to strengthen migrant workers' rights and ensure adequate living and working conditions for all.

===== Saudi Arabia =====
In Saudi Arabia, the kafala system is enshrined in the 1969 Labor Law. The 1969 law required every migrant worker to have signed a contract with an employer, placing them directly under the responsibility of the sponsor. The employers were required to subsequently request the Saudi government to grant work permits for these migrant workers. Work permits were granted upon arrival of the migrant workers, but only if they could show their employment contracts signed by both themselves and the sponsor.

The 2005 Labour Law constituted a revision of the 1969 Labor Law, but contained many of the kafala elements found in the old 1969 Labor Law. The Ministry of Labor held the responsibility for work and residence permits. Migrant workers could only receive work permits after signing a contract with an employer and being under the responsibility of the employer. Migrant workers were not allowed to work for other employers, nor were employers permitted to employ migrant workers belonging to other employers. The labor contract had to state the duration of the employment.

The 2005 Labour Law was amended in 2013, which provided Saudi police and labor authorities with the power to enforce the provisions of the Labor Law against undocumented laborers. Punishments included both detention and deportation. The 2005 Labour Law was again amended in 2015, introducing more extensive labor protections. First of all, the amendments criminalized a series of abuse labor practices. Secondly, the amendments increase paid leave and job-related injury compensation and oblige employers, when terminating a worker's contract, to provide the worker with a week's payment so other employment can be found. Thirdly, the amendments enhance the powers of inspection and enforcement of the Ministry of Labor.

Additionally, amendments included the introduction fines for labor rights violations, including the confiscations of passports, excessive working hours, dangerous working conditions, absent labor contracts, delayed salary payments and false reports of unauthorized leave. Fines, as well as prison sentences, were also introduced for migrant workers who stayed in Saudi Arabia beyond the length of their residency permit and for leaving without the employer's permission.

===== United Arab Emirates =====
In the United Arab Emirates, the kafala system was part of the 1980 Federal Law on the Regulation of Labour Relations, which regulated the relationship between the state, the sponsor and the sponsored. The law did not require any written contract to be drawn up between the employer and the migrant worker. Migrant workers required the permission of their employers to change employment and the provided sponsorship could not be transferred to another employer. The 1980 Law did regulate issues such as severance pay, repatriation pay, annual leave, standards for maximum working hours and working conditions, payment for overtime and the payment for treatment of labor-related injuries. However, the law also prohibited labor unions and strikes.

Labor law reforms were introduced in the UAE in 2016, which included a standardized offer letter prepared by the UAE's Ministry of Labor, a standardized work contract which must specify duration, nature of the work, place of employment, wages and remuneration. The changes also specify working hours as 8 hours per day or 48 hours per week. However, these working hours could be higher for those working in the service industry. Furthermore, migrant workers are allowed to change employers after six months and only if their employer consents, or if employment is not provided or if a legal complaint of some sort is issued. Both parties can agree to end the employment contract after six months. According to the reforms, contracts must be made available in both Arabic, English and a third language if required. Employers who fail to provide translations are subjected to fines.

Per UAE Federal law No. 6 of 1973 on the Entry and Residence of aliens, an employer may not deny an employee on a work visa right to an annual leave, regular paid wage, 45 days maternity leave, right to resign, resign gratuity, and a 30-day grace period to find a new job. An employer is also prohibited by law to confiscate an employee passport, force the employee to pay for his residency visa fees, or force the employee to work more than 8 hours a day or 45 hours a week without compensation. An employee who wishes to leave needs to complete their legal notice period, which is usually 30 days or less, before leaving their job or risk being banned to work in UAE for up to one year. Alien widows or divorced women whose legal presence in the country was sponsored by their husband's work status are given a 1-year visa to stay in the country without the need for a work permit or a sponsor.

==== Specific rights and protections ====
With regards to the rights and protections granted to migrant workers, the following rights are granted to migrant workers by all GCC countries:

- The right to end of service benefits
- The right to health care benefits
- The right to maternity leave
- The right to sick pay
- The right to travel provisions
- The right to vacation pay
- The right to work injury benefits.

However, the following rights are not granted to migrant workers by any of the GCC countries:

- The right to access to finance
- The right to anti-discrimination measures
- The right to facilitation of remittance transfers
- The right to family allowance or similar allowances
- The right to health care benefits for families
- The right to insolvency funds
- The right to pension benefits
- The right to portability provisions
- The right to pre-departure information and training
- The right to provisions in case of bankruptcy
- The right to wage equality
- The right to work specific labor market integration.

== Human rights issues ==
Multiple human rights organizations, in particular Human Rights Watch, have reported on widespread violations of labor and human rights of migrant workers in the Persian Gulf region. Reported abuses include the confiscation of passports, mobility restrictions, excessive working hours, delayed or absent salary payments, sub par working and living conditions, as well as sexual, physical and psychological abuse of workers by their employers.

=== Kafala system ===
The kafala system has been pointed out by human rights organization as one of the main sources of some of the human rights abuses reported in the GCC countries. As this sponsorship system, often enshrined in labor laws, assigns the employer with the sole responsibility for the migrant worker, it also provides the employer with a large amount of power leverage over their workers. In some GCC countries, employers have the ability to cancel a work permit at any time, while an employee cannot freely leave the employment without the employer's consent – in some cases, for example in Oman, not even when the contract is completed or if their sponsor submits the workers to abuses. It is reported that migrant workers who do leave without their employer's consent have received punishment in some GCC countries, which can include re-entry bans, fines and deportation. Often, migrant workers cannot leave their employment, as their employer has taken their passports. One report stated that in Qatar 90% of low income workers do not have their passports in possession.

As seen above, some states, such as Bahrain, Kuwait, Qatar and the UAE, have announced their commitment to amend the legal framework of the kafala system and to extend labor protection to migrant workers. Some of these states have made substantial changes to their labor laws to include migrant workers; other states have not implemented any changes to the kafala system.

=== Protection of migrant domestic workers ===
The labor rights of migrant domestic workers are a separate category in this regard, as all of the Gulf states, at least until recently, excluded migrant domestic workers from the protection of labor laws. According to a report by Human Rights Watch, this leaves these workers vulnerable and open to all kinds of abuses, without any type redress available to them. Some the abuses most regularly committed against migrant domestic workers according to NGO reports include sexual abuse, physical abuse, excessive working hours, the withholding of salaries, the absence of adequate food and living conditions and the confiscation of passports.

Furthermore, while some sending states have prohibited migration of domestic workers to some of the Gulf states, NGOs have argued that such prohibitions only increase the possibility of such workers seeking illegal means to enter and work in Gulf states – which in turn increases the risk of forced labor and human trafficking.

Some states, including Bahrain, Kuwait, Oman, and Qatar, have announced intentions to amend or have in fact amended existing labor laws to give domestic workers better legal protection.

In April 2020, it was revealed that, amidst the coronavirus pandemic, migrant workers in Qatar were strictly quarantined by Qatari internal security inside the industrial area. An open letter by 15 NGOs, including Human Rights Watch, Amnesty International and Migrant Rights.org, urged Doha to take initiatives for the protection of the workforce.

In March 2022, during a meeting of FIFA president Gianni Infantino with the Qatari Minister of Labour, it was reported that the new law on minimum wage in Qatar had led to increased wages for 280,000 workers (13% of the total work force). Since May 2021, the nation's legislature had voted to curtail working during high temperatures (above 32.1 °C on the WGBT index), which resulted in a reported decline in heat-related illnesses treated in the country, with 338 businesses apparently being shut down for non-compliance since its enforcement.

=== Payment of (minimum) wages ===
Most of the Gulf states have not adopted any minimum wage requirements, and migrant workers often fall within the category of “low pay” labor. In 2012, Human Rights Watch reported that Bahraini migrant workers comprised 98% of the “low pay” labor group and most of the migrant workers interviewed by Human Rights Watch earned between BD40 and BD100 ($106 and $265) as their monthly salary. In 2016 Kuwait became the first Gulf state to set a minimum wage for domestic work of KD60 (approximately $200) per month.

Another issue concerns delayed or absent salary payments. For example, in Oman it was reported that falling oil prices and the nationalization program not only led to a drop in new projects in the oil sector, but also to stranded migrant workers, who often had not been paid for six months, who did not have employment and whose work permits had expired in the meantime. Some of these workers went on to find new employment, and, lacking the permission of their previous employer, lost their work permit and thus became undocumented. Both the delayed and absent salary payments were found to be the greatest violations of labor laws during inspections in Oman in 2013.

As reported by Migrant-Rights.Org, another shortcoming relates to the creation of so-called "wage protection systems" in the Gulf states. While the Gulf's governments claim that the purpose of these systems is to "protect labor rights", according to Migrant-Rights.Org the Omani government has recently stated that it intends to use the system to monitor and gather information about the wages and bank accounts of workers – in order to keep an eye on remittances sent back to the home country. According to the same Migrant-Rights.Org report, the Omani government regards remittances as “wasted investment” and wishes to better protect its economy against such losses. The government of Saudi Arabia is also reported to use a wage protection system to control the finances and spending of migrant workers. As of 2016, there had not been any specific proposals in this regard, but the International Monetary Fund warned against potential plans of Gulf states to implement remittance taxes to increase state revenue.

In April 2020, some employers in Saudi Arabia unilaterally announced pay cuts and exploited chaotic repatriations with an aim to avoid paying migrant workers. The employees had to then return to home-countries without any money in hand.

=== Deportations ===
In recent years, Gulf states have implemented policies of large-scale deportations of both undocumented and documented migrant workers, for a variety of reasons. According to Kuwaiti media, 14,400 migrants were deported from Kuwait between January and April 2016. In 2016, a total of 29,000 migrants were deported from Kuwait, in comparison to about 25,000 migrants in 2015. In 2013, almost a million migrants were deported from Saudi Arabia, according to Migrant-Rights.Org, in order to boost employment of Saudi nationals and protect national security. In the same year, 7,346 undocumented migrants were deported from Bahrain. In 2016 reportedly more than 600 migrants were deported from Oman in just 7 days.

Migrant workers are reportedly often deported for minor transgressions, such as traffic violations, barbecuing in public spaces, complaints about working conditions, organizing strikes or violations of the terms of the residency and work permits. The arrested migrants often only spend three days to a week in prison before the actual deportation, leaving them without time or means to appeal the deportation decision. Nevertheless, these mass deportations still lead to overcrowded prisons, human rights organizations have reported. It is argued that these mass deportations are part of the Gulf States’ policies to increase employment of their nationals and to improve national security.

In spring 2013, King Abdullah of Saudi Arabia announced a government policy focused on deportation of irregular migrants, which required these migrants to regularize their status or to leave. While about one million foreign workers left voluntarily, reports estimate that between November 2013 and March 2014 around 370,000 migrant workers were forcibly deported from Saudi Arabia. It was reported that crimes were committed by the Saudi police against these migrants, including extreme violence, torture, rape and killing.

According to an investigation led by The Guardian, migrant workers were held under inhuman conditions at the detention facility in Saudi Arabia. They were not given access to clean drinking water, mattress to sleep or any medical facility, amid the COVID-19 pandemic. Smartphones were confiscated from the workers to prevent them from documenting their living conditions. In an interview with The Guardian, several inmates revealed that they had to drink water from the toilet, as they didn't have money to buy it from the officials.

In June and July months of 2020, Human Rights Watch interviewed 19 Ethiopian migrants that were in Saudi Arabia or Ethiopia. It revealed that in April 2020, Houthi rebels forcefully evicted thousands of Ethiopian migrants from the northern part of Yemen, under the threat of coronavirus. They killed hundreds of migrants and forced the rest to move towards the Saudi border. The Saudi border guards fired at the migrants killing dozens more, while hundreds of the survivors escaped to the mountainous border area. The migrants who moved were left stranded without food or water, for several days. Saudi Arabia allowed some of the migrants across their border and eventually put them in unsanitary conditions and at abusive detention facilities, without giving them the right to challenge their detention legally.

=== Access to legal remedies ===
Although access to legal remedies is provided by the 1990 International Convention on the Protection of the Rights of All Migrant Workers and Members of Their Families, and the 1975 Migrant Workers Convention (Supplementary Provisions), these conventions have not been ratified by the Gulf states. Nevertheless, access to legal redress for labor rights violations is provided in some Gulf states, but accessibility to these remedies in practice is often hampered by multiple factors.

One set of issues relates to language and mobility barriers, which hinder migrant workers’ access to institutions, information and services. Many migrant workers do not speak enough Arabic to understand the information needed to receive redress, while the lack of public transportation and the long working hours impede the mobility of migrant workers. In this regard, the reportedly existing perception that the courts will favour nationals over the migrant workers does not improve the accessibility of remedies.

Another issue in this regard is the backlog of some of the Gulf countries’ courts. In the UAE, for example, Dubai courts could not keep up with the number of labor complaints filed – especially during the 2008 financial crisis, which inhibited companies from providing their employees with work or salaries. Some critics have also pointed to understaffing and underfunding and the absence of coordination between enforcement agencies.

However, even if migrant workers gain access to legal remedies, they do not always receive redress. In the case of Bahrain, 50 Pakistani workers were detained by the authorities after they filed a complaint with the Bahraini courts concerning a lack of salary payments. Even though the court ruled in the workers’ favour, they were still detained by the authorities for at least a year and were still imprisoned in January 2017.

=== The FIFA World Cup in Qatar ===
Since Qatar was elected to host the 2022 FIFA World Cup, the country has been heavily criticized for the treatment of migrant workers in the preparations for the tournament. While Qatar has received less criticism in the past for its treatment of migrant workers than other GCC countries, the preparations for the World Cup have drawn more attention to the situation of workers' rights in the country. Workers have died at a rate of one death per day, and workers' salaries are being withheld by employers. There are also stories of Nepalese migrant workers, constituting the single largest migrant group in Qatar, seeking refuge in the Embassy of Nepal in Doha. The Guardian stated that most Nepalese migrant workers have large debts, as they borrowed money to pay their recruitment agents.

Amnesty International argues that labor migration to Qatar will continue to increase, due to the World Cup constructions and labels the conditions for workers as "grim". An additional pull factor is the intention of the Qatari government, in light of the World Cup, to transform Doha into an international hub. Government bodies in Qatar have dismissed critiques regarding the exploitation of migrants and have referred to the exploitation of migrant workers as isolated incidents.

Qatar announced sweeping labour reforms to protect migrant workers and prove its commitment to human rights in 2019. Under this, it ended the kafala system that effectively trapped the workers in abusive environments. In 2021, Qatar introduced the non-discriminatory minimum wage system that applied to workers of all nationalities, in all sectors, including domestic workers to meet the international standards.

According to the Guardian’s February 2021 report, around 6,500 migrant workers from India, Pakistan, Nepal, Bangladesh and Sri Lanka have died in Qatar since it won the bid for FIFA.

== International, regional and local responses ==
Multiple initiatives have been undertaken on the local, regional and international level, by both non-governmental organizations as well as governmental organizations. Responses from international organizations, civil society organizations, trade unions concerning the protection of migrant workers have increased, as have initiatives to report migrant workers' rights violations.

On the international level, several large NGOs, including Human Rights Watch and Amnesty International, have frequently reported on different issues regarding migrant workers' rights. Human Rights Watch has reported, inter alia, on different foreign workers' rights abuses, on specific vulnerable categories of migrant workers, and on new policies and legislation implemented by the Gulf states aimed at protecting migrant workers. Amnesty International has produced similar reports, recently focusing strongly on the 2022 FIFA World Cup in Qatar. The International Organization for Migration has also published reports on migrant workers, covering both the Asian sending states and Gulf receiving states. Although the United Nations has produced independent reports on some issues with migrant workers' rights in the Gulf, the International Labour Organization is the main agency focused on the position migrant workers. One of their projects, introduced in 2016, is the Regional Fair Migration Project in the Middle East, to promote national policies which are fair to migrants, to assist states with the implementation of migrant-friendly legislation and to improve the working conditions of migrant workers. Additionally, they publish reports on the status of migrant workers, receive complaints concerning human rights violations, and in 2015, the ILO also published a paper to improve and increase cooperation between Asian sending countries and the receiving Gulf countries. In December 2016, the Regional Office for Arab States of the ILO, together with the Executive Bureau of the Council of Ministers of Labour and Social Affairs of the GCC, signed a Plan of Joint Activities which focuses on several labor-related subjects, including the management of foreign labourers' issues.

One important NGO working on the regional level is Migrant-Rights.org, an organisation created in 2007 which draws attention to abuses of migrant workers in the Gulf region, works together with governments to effect legislative and policy changes, informs migrants workers and gives them a voice. The organisation publishes regular reports on migrant workers' rights violations, on legislative changes within the Gulf states, and on personal stories from migrant workers. They also provide detailed information, numbers and infographics, along with a graph of organisations and civil society groups with which they are connected including organizations for the general protection of migrant workers and location-specific organizations. Another organisation is the Migrant Forum Asia, a regional network of NGOs, trade unions, associations and individuals created for the protection of migrant workers' rights and the promotion of their wellbeing. They have reported on multiple issues involving Asian migrant workers in the Gulf region.

One example of a national organisation is Lawyers for Human Rights International, an India-based NGO that campaigns for the protection of workers' rights in India and overseas. One of the main objectives of the NGO is to raise awareness about human rights abuses taking place in the GCC. Furthermore, in 2003 the UAE chapter of the Migrante International was created, an alliance of Filipino migrant worker organizations across the world. The objectives of the organisation are mainly to strengthen labor protection, and to increase penalties for recruitment agencies which violate Filipino laws and for employers who violate UAE labor laws. The organisation additionally provides services such as training, legal advice, counseling and temporary shelter for Filipinos who experience abuse from their employers. Two other organisations active in Bahrain are the Bahrain Centre for Human Rights, focusing on migrant workers' rights amongst other issues, and the Migrant Workers Protection Society, created in 2005 to assist migrant workers in receiving full human rights protection. An example of an individual initiative is the development of a smartphone app for migrant workers, created by an Indian journalist in Oman in 2016 together with the Migrant Forum Asia. On downloading, the app, called MigCall, saves ten helpline telephone numbers which provides access to services in six different languages. During registration, the user must also supply an emergency contact number. In case of an emergency, the user can press the SOS button in the app and a message will be sent to the emergency contact, while the user's GPS location will be sent to the closest Indian embassy or consulate. In February 2016, the app had been downloaded 12.000.000 times.

Because of the activities of these NGOs, international organisations and local initiatives, large proportions of available data concerning migrant workers and their working conditions come from organisations. During the past decades, these actors have investigated labor conditions, human rights violations, demographics and movements, and have further created guidelines for both recipient and sending countries in order to monitor, investigate, report and strengthen policies aimed at protecting migrant workers in the GCC.

== Impact of migrants ==
After the first Gulf War in 1990–1991, Kuwait was especially affected. The immense deprivation of the country required Kuwait to rebuild the country's economy and infrastructure, mainly through the reconstruction of the petroleum industry. Although the pre-war level of the GDP per capita was achieved already in 1992, it constituted a costly the process.

Sending areas, too, have seen a variety of transformations with labour migration to the GCC region impacting upon gender, kin and other social relations. Newer sending regions have also emerged. In India, for example, migration to the Gulf was originally dominated by migrants from the south of the country, particularly Kerala. More recently, northern regions of the country - including Uttar Pradesh and Bihar - have emerged as the largest sending regions in terms of absolute numbers. The circular nature of the majority of labour migration - a consequence of the Kafala system - has also led to sending regions being impacted by the ideas, cultural practices, religiosity and styles brought back by migrants returning from the GCC region.

== See also ==
- Foreign workers in Saudi Arabia
- Migrant worker
- Kafala system
- Migrant domestic workers
- Migrant domestic workers in Lebanon
- Remittance
- Migrant Workers (Supplementary Provisions) Convention, 1975
- United Nations Convention on the Protection of the Rights of All Migrant Workers and Members of Their Families
