= C61 =

C61 may refer to:

- ARM Cadete Vicente Suarez (C61), an Admirable-class minesweeper of the Mexican Navy
- Bill C-61 (39th Canadian Parliament, 2nd Session), an act to amend the Copyright Act
- Caldwell 61, a galaxy
- Caudron C.61, a French civil transport biplane
- Fairchild C-61 Forwarder, an American military aircraft
- JNR Class C61, a class of Japanese steam locomotive
- Prostate cancer
- Reduction of Hours of Work (Textiles) Convention, 1937 of the International Labour Organization
- Ruy Lopez, a chess opening
