= Contracts of Employment (Indigenous Workers) Convention =

Contracts of Employment (Indigenous Workers) Convention may refer to:

- Contracts of Employment (Indigenous Workers) Convention, 1939 (shelved), International Labour Organization convention from 1939 to 1948
- Contracts of Employment (Indigenous Workers) Convention, 1947 (shelved), International Labour Organization convention from 1947 to 1953
