= Penal Sanctions (Indigenous Workers) Convention, 1939 (shelved) =

International Labour Organization Convention

C65
- ILO Convention
- Date of adoption: June 27, 1939
- Date in force: July 8, 1948
- This Convention has been "shelved".
- Subject: Indigenous and Tribal Peoples
- Previous: Contracts of Employment (Indigenous Workers) Convention, 1939 (shelved)
- Next: Migration for Employment Convention, 1939

Penal Sanctions (Indigenous Workers) Convention, 1939 (shelved) is an International Labour Organization Convention.

It was established in 1939, with the preamble stating:

Having decided upon the adoption of certain proposals with regard to the progressive abolition of penal sanctions for breaches of contracts of employment by indigenous workers,...

== Ratifications ==
Prior to it being shelved, the convention had been ratified by 33 states.
