= Convention Concerning Statistics of Wages and Hours of Work, 1938 =

International Labour Organization Convention

C63
- ILO Convention
- Date of adoption: June 20, 1938
- Date in force: June 22, 1940
- Classification: Labour Statistics
- Subject: Labour Administration and Inspection
- Previous: Safety Provisions (Building) Convention, 1937
- Next: Contracts of Employment (Indigenous Workers) Convention, 1939 (shelved)

The Convention Concerning Statistics of Wages and Hours of Work, 1938 is an International Labour Organization Convention.

It was established in 1938:

Having decided upon the adoption of certain proposals with regard to statistics of wages and hours of work in the principal mining and manufacturing industries, including building and construction, and in agriculture,...

== Ratifications ==
As of 2013, the convention has been ratified by 34 states. Of the ratifying states, 20 have denounced the treaty by means of an automatic process that denounces the 1938 treaty when other superseding conventions are ratified by the same state.
