= Migration for Employment Convention (Revised), 1949 =

International Labour Organization

C97
- ILO Convention
- Date of adoption: July 1, 1949
- Date in force: January 22, 1952
- Classification: Migrant workers
- Subject: Migrant workers
- Previous: Fee-Charging Employment Agencies Convention (Revised), 1949
- Next: Right to Organise and Collective Bargaining Convention, 1949

Migration for Employment Convention (Revised), 1949 is an International Labour Organization Convention for migrant workers.

It was established in 1949, with the preamble stating:

Having decided upon the adoption of certain proposals with regard to the revision of the Migration for Employment Convention, 1939,...

And the Article 1 states that: Each Member of the International Labour Organisation for which this Convention is in force undertakes to make available on request to the International Labour Office and to each Member,

- a) information on national policies, law and regulations relating to emigration and immigration.
- b) information on special provisions concerning migration for employment and the conditions of work and livelihood of migrants for employment.
- c) information concerning general agreement and special arrangements on these questions concluded by the Member.

The convention was followed up by Migrant Workers (Supplementary Provisions) Convention, 1975 and United Nations Convention on the Protection of the Rights of All Migrant Workers and Members of Their Families.

== Modification ==
The principles contained in the convention are a revision of ILO Convention C66, Migration for Employment Convention, 1939, which was not ratified by any countries and never came into force.

== Ratifications ==
As of 2025, the convention has been ratified by 54 states. Former parties to the statute include Yugoslavia and Zanzibar.

Country	Date	Status
Albania	02 Mar 2005	In Force
Algeria	19 Oct 1962	In Force
Armenia	27 Jan 2006	In Force
Bahamas	25 May 1976	In Force
Barbados	08 May 1967	In Force
Belgium	27 Jul 1953	In Force
Belize	15 Dec 1983	In Force
Bosnia and Herzegovina	02 Jun 1993	In Force
Brazil	18 Jun 1965	In Force
Burkina Faso	09 Jun 1961	In Force
Cameroon	03 Sep 1962	In Force
Comoros	15 Jul 2021	In Force
Congo	26 Oct 2023	In Force
Cuba	29 Apr 1952	In Force
Cyprus	23 Sep 1960	In Force
Dominica	28 Feb 1983	In Force
Ecuador	05 Apr 1978	In Force
France	29 Mar 1954	In Force
Germany	22 Jun 1959	In Force
Grenada	09 Jul 1979	In Force
Guatemala	13 Feb 1952	In Force
Guyana	08 Jun 1966	In Force
Israel	30 Mar 1953	In Force
Italy	22 Oct 1952	In Force
Jamaica	26 Dec 1962	In Force
Kenya	30 Nov 1965	In Force
Kyrgyzstan	10 Sep 2008	In Force
Madagascar	14 Jun 2001	In Force
Malawi	22 Mar 1965	In Force
Malaysia	03 Mar 1964	In Force
Mauritius	02 Dec 1969	In Force
Moldova	12 Dec 2005	In Force
Montenegro	03 Jun 2006	In Force
Morocco	14 Jun 2019	In Force
Netherlands	20 May 1952	In Force
New Zealand	10 Nov 1950	In Force
Nigeria	17 Oct 1960	In Force
North Macedonia	17 Nov 1991	In Force
Norway	17 Feb 1955	In Force
Philippines	21 Apr 2009	In Force
Portugal	12 Dec 1978	In Force
Saint Lucia	14 May 1980	In Force
Serbia	24 Nov 2000	ratified as Serbia and Montenegro
Sierra Leone	25 Aug 2021	In Force
Slovenia	29 May 1992	In Force
Somalia	08 Mar 2021	In Force
Spain	21 Mar 1967	In Force
Tajikistan	10 Apr 2007	In Force
Tanzania	22 Jun 1964	In Force
Trinidad and Tobago	24 May 1963	In Force
United Kingdom	22 Jan 1951	In Force
Uruguay	18 Mar 1954	In Force
Venezuela	09 Jun 1983	In Force
Zambia	02 Dec 1964	In Force
