= International Migrants Day =

United Nations observance, 18 December

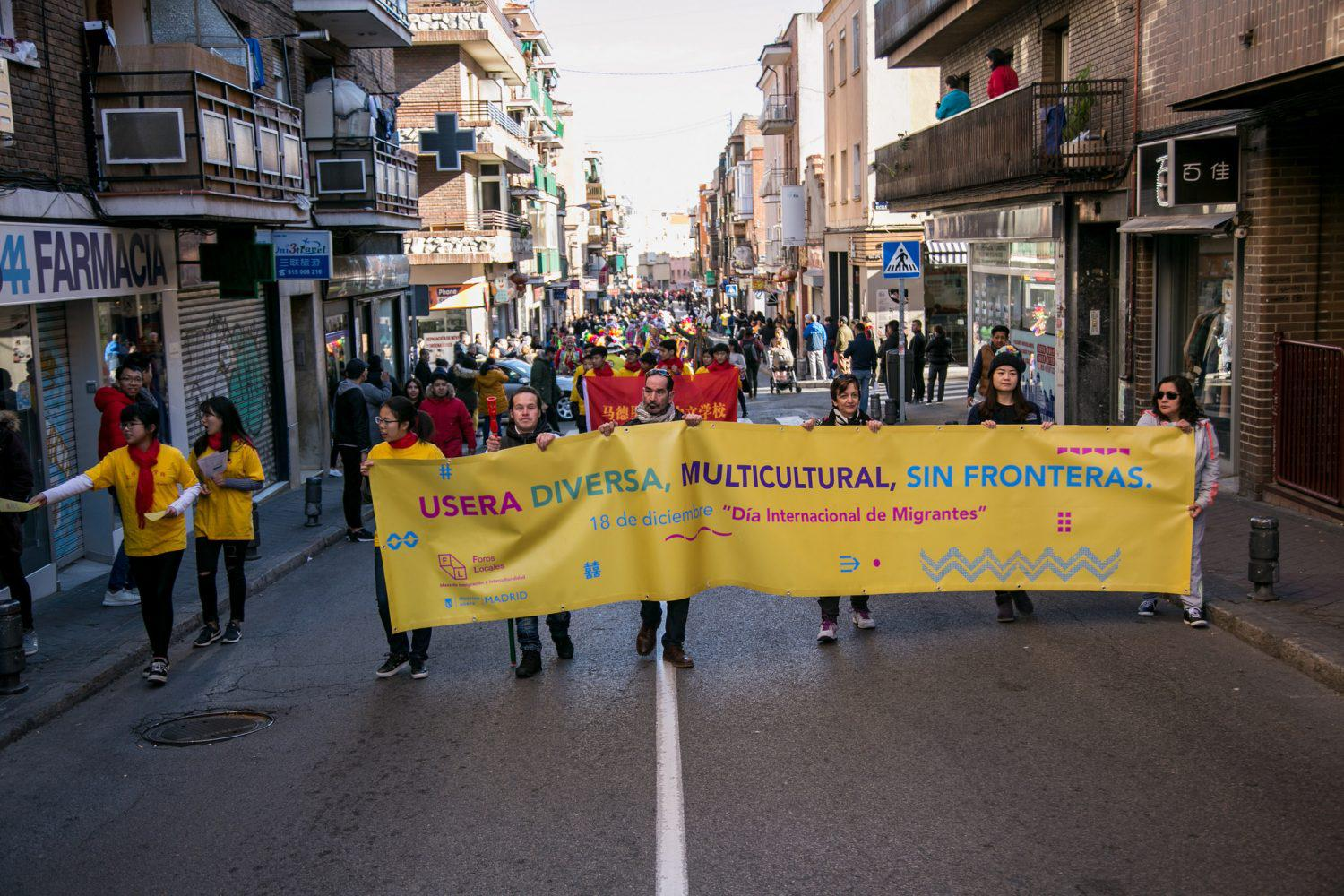
- Celebrations of the 2017 International Migrants Day in Usera, a neighborhood of Madrid, Spain
- Observed by: All UN Member States
- Celebrations: 2019
- Date: 18 December
- Next time: 18 December 2026
- Frequency: annual

On 18 December 1990, the General Assembly of the United Nations adopted a resolution on the International Convention on the Protection of the Rights of All Migrant Workers and Members of Their Families.

Each year on 18 December, the United Nations, through the UN-related agency International Organization for Migration (IOM), uses International Migrants Day to highlight the contributions made by the roughly 272 million migrants, including more than 41 million internally displaced persons, and the challenges they face.

This global event, supported by events organized by IOM's nearly 500 country offices and sub-offices as well as governmental, international and domestic civil society partners examines a wide range of migration themes, Social Cohesion, Dignity, Exploitation, Solidarity to advocate for migration guided by the principle that humane and orderly migration benefits migrants and society.

== Reasons for the Day ==
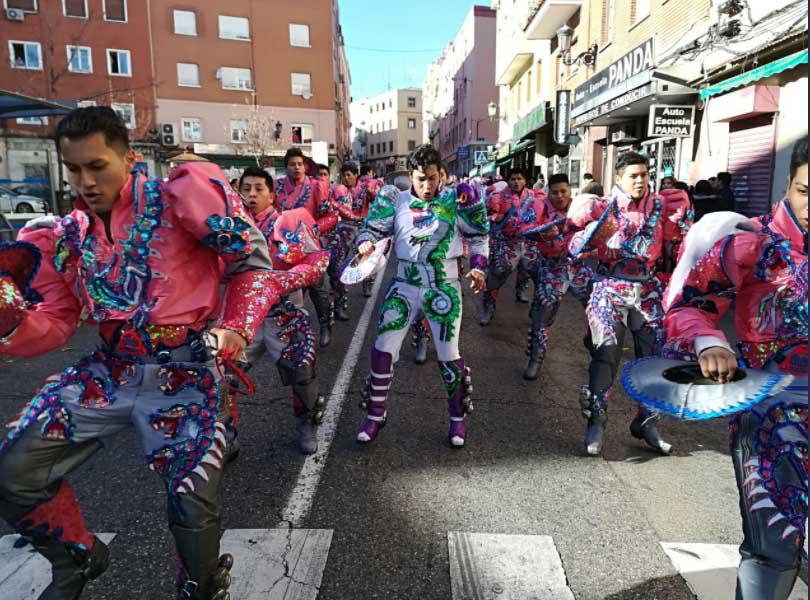
Celebrations of the 2017 International Migrants Day in Usera, a neighborhood of Madrid, Spain

In 1997, Filipino and other Asian migrant organizations began celebrating and promoting 18 December as the International Day of Solidarity with Migrants. This date was chosen because it was on 18 December 1990 that the UN adopted the International Convention on the Protection of the Rights of All Migrant Workers and Members of Their Families.

Building on this initiative, 18 December with support from Migrant Rights International and the Steering Committee for the Global Campaign for Ratification of the International Convention on Migrants' Rights and many other organizations – began late 1999 campaigning online for the official UN designation of an International Migrant's Day, which was finally proclaimed on 4 December 2000.

The United Nations proclamation of the International Migrants Day is an important step, offering a rallying point for all those concerned with the protection of migrants. The UN invited all UN member states, intergovernmental and non-governmental organizations to observe this day by disseminating information on human rights and fundamental freedoms of migrants, sharing experiences, and undertaking action to ensure the protection of migrants.

International Migrants Day is seen as an opportunity to recognize the contributions made by millions of migrants to the economies of their host and home countries promotes respect for their basic human rights.

== Global actions to celebrate International Migrants Day ==
Making migrants' voices heard is the common thread throughout International Migrants Day events. Since 2016, International Migrants Day has also served as the platform for the gala final event of IOM's three-week-long Global Migration Film Festival (GMFF) which in 2019 featured more than 620 screenings of migration-themed movies and panel discussions about IMD2019's theme of Social Cohesion in 107 countries around the world.

== See also ==
- Global Compact for Migration
- World Refugee Day
