= Safety Provisions (Building) Convention, 1937 =

International Labour Organization Convention

C62
- ILO Convention
- Date of adoption: June 23, 1937
- Date in force: July 4, 1942
- Classification: Construction
- Subject: Occupational Safety and Health
- Previous: Reduction of Hours of Work (Textiles) Convention, 1937
- Next: Convention concerning Statistics of Wages and Hours of Work, 1938

Safety Provisions (Building) Convention, 1937 is an International Labour Organization Convention.

It was established in 1937:

Considering that building work gives rise to serious accident risks which it is necessary to reduce both on humanitarian and on economic grounds, and

Having decided upon the adoption of certain proposals with regard to safety provisions for workers in the building industry with reference to scaffolding and hoisting machinery,...

== Ratifications and denunciations ==
- As of January 2023, the convention had been ratified by 30 states. However, eleven of the ratifying states have automatically denounced the treaty because of subsequent ratification of conventions that automatically trigger denunciation of the 1937 treaty.
