= Migrant Workers Convention =

International agreement signed in 1990

International Convention on the Protection of the Rights of All Migrant Workers and Members of Their Families
- States parties and signatories to the treaty: Parties Signatories
- Signed: 18 December 1990
- Location: New York
- Effective: 1 July 2003
- Condition: 20 ratifications
- Signatories: 40
- Parties: 60
- Depositary: Secretary-General of the United Nations
- Languages: Arabic, Chinese, English, French, Russian and Spanish

The International Convention on the Protection of the Rights of All Migrant Workers and Members of Their Families is a United Nations multilateral treaty governing the protection of migrant workers and families. Signed on 18 December 1990, it entered into force on 1 July 2003 after the threshold of 20 ratifying States was reached in March 2003. The Committee on Migrant Workers (CMW) monitors implementation of the convention, and is one of the seven UN-linked human rights treaty bodies. The convention applies as of November 2024 in 60 countries.

== Context ==
In his 9 November 2002 report on strengthening the organization, United Nations Secretary-General Kofi Annan wrote: "It is time to take a more comprehensive look at the various dimensions of the migration issue, which now involves hundreds of millions of people, and affects countries of origin, transit and destination. We need to understand better the causes of international flows of people and their complex interrelationship with development."

== Overview ==
The United Nations Convention constitutes a comprehensive international treaty regarding the protection of migrant workers' rights. It emphasizes the connection between migration and human rights, which is increasingly becoming a crucial policy topic worldwide. The Convention aims at protecting migrant workers and members of their families; its existence sets a moral standard, and serves as a guide and stimulus for the promotion of migrant rights in each country.

In the Preamble, the Convention recalls conventions by International Labour Organization on migrant workers: Migration for Employment Convention (Revised), 1949, Migrant Workers (Supplementary Provisions) Convention, 1975, and on forced labour; Forced Labour Convention and Abolition of Forced Labour Convention as well as international human rights treaties including Convention against Discrimination in Education.

The primary objective of the Convention is to foster respect for migrants' human rights. Migrants are not only workers, they are also human beings. The Convention does not create new rights for migrants but aims at guaranteeing equality of treatment, and the same working conditions, including in case of temporary work, for migrants and nationals. The Convention innovates because it relies on the fundamental notion that all migrants should have access to a minimum degree of protection. The Convention recognizes that regular migrants have the legitimacy to claim more rights than irregular immigrants, but it stresses that irregular migrants must see their fundamental human rights respected, like all human beings.

In the meantime, the Convention proposes that actions be taken to eradicate clandestine movements, notably through the fight against misleading information inciting people to migrate irregularly, and through sanctions against traffickers and employers of undocumented migrants.

Article 7 of this Convention protects the rights of migrant workers and their families regardless of "sex, race, colour, language, religion or conviction, political or other opinion, national, ethnic or social origin, nationality, age, economic position, property, marital status, birth, or other status". And Article 29 protects rights of child of migrant worker to name, to registration of birth and to a nationality.

This Convention is also recalled by the Convention on the Rights of Persons with Disabilities at the Preamble.

== Parties and signatories ==
As of September 2023 countries that have ratified the Convention are primarily countries of origin of migrants (such as Mexico, Morocco, and the Philippines). For these countries, the Convention is an important vehicle to protect their citizens living abroad. In the Philippines, for example, ratification of the Convention took place in a context characterized by several cases of Filipino workers being mistreated abroad: such cases hurt the Filipino population and prompted the ratification of the Convention. However, these countries are also transit and destination countries, and the Convention delineates their responsibility to protect the rights of migrants in their territory, and they have done little to protect those at home.

No migrant-receiving state in Western Europe or North America has ratified the Convention. Other important receiving countries, such as Australia, Arab states of the Persian Gulf, India and South Africa have not ratified the Convention.

Parties
Signatories
Non-signatories

World population covered by the treaty (Note: Population figures are 2020 mid-year medium-variant projections from the United Nations World Population Prospects 2019.)

Legend	Population	Per.
Parties	1,830,978,000	23.49%
Signatories	83,145,000	1.07%
Non-signatories	5,880,676,000	75.44%

Parties and signatories
State	Status	Signature	Deposit	Method	Population
Albania	Party		5 June 2007	Accession	2,878,000
Algeria	Party		21 April 2005	Accession	43,851,000
Argentina	Party	10 August 2004	23 February 2007	Ratification	45,196,000
Armenia	Signatory	26 September 2013			2,963,000
Azerbaijan	Party		11 January 1999	Accession	10,139,000
Bangladesh	Party	7 October 1998	24 August 2011	Ratification	164,689,000
Belize	Party		14 November 2001	Accession	398,000
Benin	Party	15 September 2005	6 July 2018	Ratification	12,123,000
Bolivia	Party		16 October 2000	Accession	11,673,000
Bosnia and Herzegovina	Party		13 December 1996	Accession	3,281,000
Burkina Faso	Party	16 November 2001	26 November 2003	Ratification	20,903,000
Cabo Verde	Party		16 September 1997	Accession	556,000
Cambodia	Signatory	27 September 2004			16,719,000
Cameroon	Signatory	15 December 2009			26,546,000
Chad	Party	26 September 2012	22 February 2022	Ratification	16,426,000
Chile	Party	24 September 1993	21 March 2005	Ratification	19,116,000
Colombia	Party		24 May 1995	Accession	50,883,000
Comoros	Signatory	22 September 2000			870,000
Congo, Republic of the	Party	29 September 2008	31 March 2017	Ratification	5,518,000
Côte d'Ivoire	Party		26 September 2023	Accession	25,717,000
Ecuador	Party		5 February 2002	Accession	17,643,000
Egypt	Party		19 February 1993	Accession	102,334,000
El Salvador	Party	13 September 2002	14 March 2003	Ratification	6,486,000
Fiji	Party		19 August 2019	Accession	896,000
Gabon	Signatory	15 December 2004			2,226,000
Gambia	Party	20 September 2017	28 September 2018	Ratification	2,417,000
Ghana	Party	7 September 2000	7 September 2000	Ratification	31,073,000
Guatemala	Party	7 September 2000	14 March 2003	Ratification	17,916,000
Guinea	Party		7 September 2000	Accession	13,133,000
Guinea-Bissau	Party	12 September 2000	22 October 2018	Ratification	1,968,000
Guyana	Party	15 September 2005	7 July 2010	Ratification	787,000
Haiti	Signatory	5 December 2013			11,403,000
Honduras	Party		9 August 2005	Accession	9,905,000
Indonesia	Party	22 September 2004	31 May 2012	Ratification	273,524,000
Jamaica	Party	25 September 2008	25 September 2008	Ratification	2,961,000
Kyrgyzstan	Party		29 September 2003	Accession	6,524,000
Lesotho	Party	24 September 2004	16 September 2005	Ratification	2,142,000
Liberia	Signatory	22 September 2004			5,058,000
Libya	Party		18 June 2004	Accession	6,871,000
Madagascar	Party	24 September 2014	13 May 2015	Ratification	27,691,000
Malawi	Party	23 September 2022	23 September 2022	Ratification	19,130,000
Mali	Party		5 June 2003	Accession	20,251,000
Mauritania	Party		22 January 2007	Accession	4,650,000
Mexico	Party	22 May 1991	8 March 1999	Ratification	128,933,000
Montenegro	Signatory	23 October 2006			628,000
Morocco	Party	15 August 1991	21 June 1993	Ratification	36,911,000
Mozambique	Party	15 March 2012	19 August 2013	Ratification	31,255,000
Nicaragua	Party		26 October 2005	Accession	6,625,000
Niger	Party		18 March 2009	Accession	24,207,000
Nigeria	Party		27 July 2009	Accession	206,140,000
Palau	Signatory	20 September 2011			18,000
Paraguay	Party	13 September 2000	23 September 2008	Ratification	7,133,000
Peru	Party	22 September 2004	14 September 2005	Ratification	32,972,000
Philippines	Party	15 November 1993	5 July 1995	Ratification	109,581,000
Rwanda	Party		15 December 2008	Accession	12,952,000
São Tomé and Príncipe	Party	6 September 2000	10 January 2017	Ratification	219,000
Senegal	Party		9 June 1999	Accession	16,744,000
Serbia	Signatory	11 November 2004			8,737,000
Seychelles	Party		15 December 1994	Accession	98,000
Sierra Leone	Signatory	15 September 2000			7,977,000
Sri Lanka	Party		11 March 1996	Accession	21,413,000
Saint Vincent and the Grenadines	Party		29 October 2010	Accession	111,000
Syria	Party		2 June 2005	Accession	17,501,000
Tajikistan	Party	7 September 2000	8 January 2002	Ratification	9,538,000
Timor-Leste	Party		30 January 2004	Accession	1,318,000
Togo	Party	15 November 2001	16 December 2020	Ratification	8,279,000
Turkey	Party	13 January 1999	27 September 2004	Ratification	84,339,000
Uganda	Party		14 November 1995	Accession	45,741,000
Uruguay	Party		15 February 2001	Accession	3,474,000
Venezuela	Party	4 October 2011	25 October 2016	Ratification	28,436,000
Zimbabwe	Party		5 November 2024	Accession	30,965,000

== Intersessional panel discussion ==
In June/July 2022, at the Human Rights Council Fiftieth session, the Human Rights Council held an Intersessional panel discussion on the human rights of migrants in vulnerable situations that were previously stated under 35/17 and 47/12 resolutions. The High Commissioner pointed out concerns related to the criminalization of migration, gender-based violence, arbitrary detention, family separation, loss of lives, harmful and dehumanizing narratives, and pervasive discrimination owing to personal factors, including age, gender, or disability. The broader impact of COVID-19 was also highlighted. Statements were provided by panelists reiterating that all migrants, regardless of status, were entitled to all human rights. Concerns on situations of vulnerability that migrants encountered in transit and at borders and violence perpetrated against migrants, including by State and non-State actors were also referred. Calls were made for independent mechanisms to monitor human rights violations, increase attention to the human rights of migrants, the importance of international cooperation, and the need to translate these rights into adequate legal and regulatory provisions. Additional recommendations included the need for implementing comprehensive protection regimes to identify and address situations of vulnerability in the process of migration. Remarks were made on the need for the international community to understand the root causes of migration and the challenges associated with it, and the range of measures that are needed to respond adequately to those challenges. Annual panel discussions were suggested by the High Commissioner.

== See also ==
- Convention on domestic workers
- Foreign worker
- Immigration
- International Labour Organization
- International Migrants Day
- International Organization for Migration
- Migrant workers
- Migration for Employment Convention (Revised), 1949
- Migrant Workers (Supplementary Provisions) Convention, 1975
- Universal Declaration of Human Rights
