= Migration for Employment Convention, 1939 =

International Labour Organization Convention

C66
- ILO Convention
- Date of adoption: June 28, 1939
- Date in force: Withdrawn; May 30, 2000
- Classification: Migrant Workers
- Subject: Migrant Workers
- Previous: Penal Sanctions (Indigenous Workers) Convention, 1939 (shelved)
- Next: Hours of Work and Rest Periods (Road Transport) Convention, 1939 (shelved)

Migration for Employment Convention, 1939 is an International Labour Organization Convention.

It was established in 1939, with the preamble stating:

Having decided upon the adoption of certain proposals with regard to the recruiting, placing and conditions of labour (equality of treatment) of migrant workers,...

The treaty was not ratified by any countries and was never brought into force.

== Withdrawn ==
The convention was withdrawn at the ILO General Conference May 30, 2000.

== Modification ==
The principles found in the convention were subsequently revised and included in the ILO Convention C97, Migration for Employment Convention (Revised), 1949.
