= Contracts of Employment (Indigenous Workers) Convention, 1939 (shelved) =

International Labour Organization Convention

C64
- ILO Convention
- Date of adoption: June 27, 1939
- Date in force: July 8, 1948
- This Convention has been "shelved".
- Classification: Indigenous and Tribal Peoples
- Subject: Indigenous and Tribal Peoples
- Previous: Convention concerning Statistics of Wages and Hours of Work, 1938
- Next: Penal Sanctions (Indigenous Workers) Convention, 1939 (shelved)

Contracts of Employment (Indigenous Workers) Convention, 1939 (shelved) is an International Labour Organization Convention.

It was established in 1939:

Having decided upon the adoption of certain proposals with regard to the regulation of contracts of employment of indigenous workers,...

== Ratifications ==
Prior to its shelving, the convention was ratified by 31 states.
