= Reduction of Hours of Work (Textiles) Convention, 1937 =

International Labour Organization Convention

C61
- ILO Convention
- Date of adoption: June 22, 1937
- Date in force: Withdrawn; May 30, 2000
- Classification: Hours of Work
- Subject: Working Time
- Previous: Minimum Age (Non-Industrial Employment) Convention (Revised), 1937 (shelved)
- Next: Safety Provisions (Building) Convention, 1937

Reduction of Hours of Work (Textiles) Convention, 1937 is an International Labour Organization Convention.

It was established in 1937:

Considering that the question of the reduction of hours of work in the textile industry is the second item on the agenda of the Session;

Confirming the principle laid down in the Forty-Hour Week Convention, 1935, including the maintenance of the standard of living;

Considering it to be desirable that this principle should be applied by international agreement to the textile industry;...

== Withdrawn ==
The convention was never brought into force, and was withdrawn at the ILO General Conference May 30, 2000.

== Ratifications ==
No countries ratified this convention.
