= USS Intrigue =

Minesweeper of the United States Navy

History

United States
- Name: USS Intrigue (AM-253)
- Builder: Savannah Machine and Foundry Company, Savannah, Georgia
- Laid down: 17 December 1943
- Launched: 8 April 1944
- Sponsored by: Mrs. Henry R. Keller
- Commissioned: 31 July 1944
- Decommissioned: 31 May 1946
- Reclassified: MSF-253, 7 February 1955
- Stricken: 1 May 1962
- Fate: Transferred to Mexican Navy, 1 October 1962

History

Mexico
- Name: ARM DM-19
- Acquired: 1 October 1962
- Renamed: ARM Cadete Vicente Suárez (C61), 1994
- Namesake: Vicente Suárez
- Reclassified: A06 (training ship)
- Stricken: 16 July 2001
- Fate: unknown

General characteristics
- Class & type: Admirable-class minesweeper
- Displacement: 650 long tons (660 t)
- Length: 184 ft 6 in (56.24 m)
- Beam: 33 ft (10 m)
- Draft: 9 ft 9 in (2.97 m)
- Propulsion: 2 × ALCO 539 diesel engines, 1,710 shp (1,280 kW); Farrel-Birmingham single reduction gear; 2 shafts
- Speed: 15 knots (28 km/h)
- Complement: 104
- Armament: 1 × 3"/50 caliber (76 mm) DP gun; 2 × twin Bofors 40 mm guns; 1 × Hedgehog anti-submarine mortar; 2 × Depth charge tracks

Service record
- Part of: U.S. Atlantic Fleet (1944–1946); Atlantic Reserve Fleet (1946–1962); Mexican Navy (1962–2001)

USS Intrigue (AM-253) was an Admirable-class minesweeper built for the United States Navy during World War II. She served in the Atlantic during World War II. In May 1946, she was taken out of service and put in reserve. While she remained in reserve, Intrigue was reclassified as MSF-253 in February 1955 but never reactivated. In October 1962, she was sold to the Mexican Navy and renamed ARM DM-19. In 1994, she was renamed ARM Vicente Suárez (C61), and, later converted to a training ship with pennant number A06. She was stricken in July 2001, but her ultimate fate is not reported in secondary sources.

== U.S. Navy career ==
Intrigue was laid down 17 December 1943 by Savannah Machine & Foundry Co., Savannah, Georgia; launched 8 April 1944; sponsored by Mrs. Henry R. Keller; and commissioned 31 July 1944. Following exhaustive shakedown in Chesapeake Bay, Intrigue departed Norfolk, Virginia, 28 September 1944 for coastal convoy duty. She sailed with cargo ships from American ports to the Panama Canal Zone and as far north as Argentia, Newfoundland, before returning to Norfolk 5 December 1944. In January 1945 she served as a target-towing vessel off the coast, and in June Intrigue sailed to Miami, Florida, to train student officers on the Florida coast. She arrived 23 September at Yorktown, Virginia, to act as training ship at the Mine Warfare School,

Intrigue was decommissioned 31 May 1946. Intrigue subsequently joined the Atlantic Reserve Fleet at Orange, Texas, and reclassified MSF-253 on 7 February 1955. She was struck from the Naval Vessel Register on 1 May 1962 and sold to Mexico on 1 October 1962.

== Mexican Navy career ==
The former Intrigue was acquired by the Mexican Navy in October 1962 and renamed ARM DM-19. In 1994, she was renamed ARM Vicente Suárez (C61) after Vicente Suárez. She was later converted to a training ship and assigned the new pennant number of A06. She was stricken on 16 July 2001, but her ultimate fate is not reported in secondary sources.

== Notes ==
- Photo gallery of USS Intrigue at NavSource Naval History
