= Migrant Workers (Supplementary Provisions) Convention =

International Labour Organization Convention

Migrant Workers (Supplementary Provisions) Convention, 1975
C143
- ILO Convention
- Date of adoption: June 24, 1975
- Date in force: December 9, 1978
- Classification: Migrant workers
- Subject: Migrant workers
- Previous: Human Resources Development Convention, 1975
- Next: Tripartite Consultation (International Labour Standards) Convention, 1976

Migrant Workers (Supplementary Provisions) Convention, 1975, or Convention concerning Migrations in Abusive Conditions and the Promotion of Equality of Opportunity and Treatment of Migrant Workers is an International Labour Organization Convention for the rights of migrant workers. However unlike the United Nations Convention on the Protection of the Rights of All Migrant Workers and Members of Their Families, there are restrictions of migrant worker to be applied on Article 11.

It was established in 1975:

Having decided upon the adoption of certain proposals with regard to migrant workers,...

- Article 1. Each Member for which this Convention in force undertake to respect the basic human rights of all migrant workers.
- Article 11. (1)For this Convention the term migrant worker means a person who migrates or who has migrated from one country to another with a view to bring employed otherwise than on his own account and includes any person regularly admitted as a migrant worker.

(2) It does not apply to (a) frontier workers (b) artistes and members of liberal profession (c) seamen (d) persons coming specially for purpose of education

== Ratifications ==
As of 2025, the convention has been ratified by 30 states. Yugoslavia is a former ratifying state.

Countries	Date	Notes
Albania	12 Sep 2006	excluding articles 10 to 14
Armenia	27 Jan 2006	
Benin	11 Jun 1980	
Bosnia and Herzegovina	02 Jun 1993	
Burkina Faso	09 Dec 1977	
Cameroon	04 Jul 1978	
Comoros	15 Jul 2021	
Congo	26 Oct 2023	
Cyprus	28 Jun 1977	
Guinea	05 Jun 1978	
Italy	23 Jun 1981	
Kenya	09 Apr 1979	
Madagascar	11 Jun 2019	
Mauritania	23 Sep 2019	
Montenegro	03 Jun 2006	
North Macedonia	17 Nov 1991	ratified as the Republic of Macedonia
Norway	24 Jan 1979	
Philippines	14 Sep 2006	
Portugal	12 Dec 1978	
San Marino	23 May 1985	
Serbia	24 Nov 2000	ratified as the Federal Republic of Yugoslavia
Sierra Leone	25 Aug 2021	
Slovenia	29 May 1992	
Somalia	08 Mar 2021	
Sweden	28 Dec 1982	
Tajikistan	10 Apr 2007	
Togo	08 Nov 1983	
Uganda	31 Mar 1978	
Venezuela	17 Aug 1983	
