= Abolition of Forced Labour Convention =

International Labour Organization Convention

Convention concerning the Abolition of Forced Labour
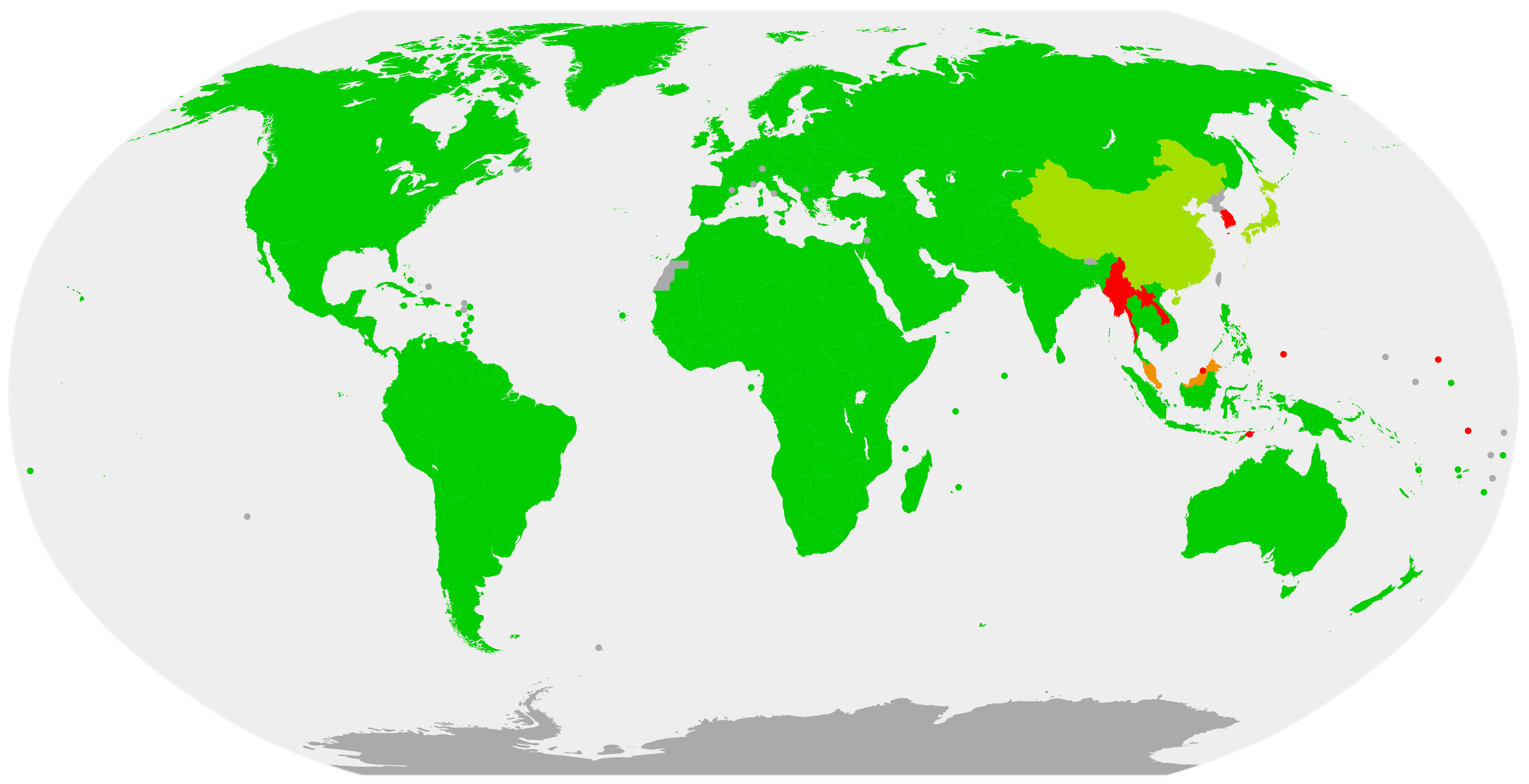
- Contracting and in force states Contracting but not in force States that denounced the convention Non-contracting states Not a member of ILO
- Signed: 25 June 1957
- Effective: 17 January 1959
- Condition: 2 ratifications
- Parties: 176 (178 ratifications less two denunciations)
- Depositary: Director-General of the International Labour Office
- Languages: French and English

Abolition of Forced Labour Convention, 1957, the full title of which is Convention concerning the Abolition of Forced Labour, 1957 (No. 105), is one of the eight ILO fundamental conventions of the International Labour Organization, which cancels certain forms of forced labour still allowed under the Forced Labour Convention of 1930, such as punishment for strikes and as a punishment for holding certain political views.

In order to implement the 1930 Forced Labour Convention and the 1957 Abolition of Forced Labour Convention, the Special Action Programme to Combat Forced Labour was set up.

== Ratifications ==
As of October 2022, the convention has been ratified by 178 of the 187 ILO members. Nine ILO members have not ratified the convention:

- Brunei
- East Timor
- Laos
- Marshall Islands
- Myanmar
- Palau
- South Korea
- Tonga
- Tuvalu

Two countries that had ratified the convention (Malaysia and Singapore) have since denounced it. In addition, seven members of the United Nations are not members of the ILO and thus are not eligible to ratify the Convention unless they first join the ILO: Andorra, Bhutan, Liechtenstein, Micronesia, Monaco, Nauru, and North Korea.

Country	Date	Status	Note
Afghanistan	1963-05-16	In Force	
Albania	1997-02-27	In Force	
Algeria	1969-06-12	In Force	
Angola	1976-06-04	In Force	
Antigua and Barbuda	1983-02-02	In Force	
Argentina	1960-01-18	In Force	
Armenia	2004-12-17	In Force	
Australia	1960-06-07	In Force	
Austria	1958-03-05	In Force	
Azerbaijan	2000-08-09	In Force	
Bahamas	1976-05-25	In Force	
Bahrain	1998-07-14	In Force	
Bangladesh	1972-06-22	In Force	
Barbados	1967-05-08	In Force	
Belarus	1995-09-25	In Force	
Belgium	1961-01-23	In Force	
Belize	1983-12-15	In Force	
Benin	1961-05-22	In Force	
Bolivia	1990-06-11	In Force	
Bosnia and Herzegovina	2000-11-15	In Force	
Botswana	1997-06-05	In Force	
Brazil	1965-06-18	In Force	
Bulgaria	1999-03-23	In Force	
Burkina Faso	1997-08-25	In Force	
Burundi	1963-03-11	In Force	
Cape Verde	1979-04-03	In Force	
Cambodia	1999-08-23	In Force	
Cameroon	1962-09-03	In Force	
Canada	1959-07-14	In Force	
Central African Republic	1964-06-09	In Force	
Chad	1961-06-08	In Force	
Chile	1999-02-01	In Force	
China	2022-08-12	In Force	
Colombia	1963-06-07	In Force	
Comoros	1978-10-23	In Force	
Congo	1999-11-26	In Force	
Cook Islands	2015-06-12	In Force	
Costa Rica	1959-05-04	In Force	
Croatia	1997-03-05	In Force	
Cuba	1958-06-02	In Force	
Cyprus	1960-09-23	In Force	
Czech Republic	1996-08-06	In Force	
Democratic Republic of the Congo	2001-06-20	In Force	
Denmark	1958-01-17	In Force	
Djibouti	1978-08-03	In Force	
Dominica	1983-02-28	In Force	
Dominican Republic	1958-06-23	In Force	
Ecuador	1962-02-05	In Force	
Egypt	1958-10-23	In Force	
El Salvador	1958-11-18	In Force	
Equatorial Guinea	2001-08-13	In Force	
Eritrea	2000-02-22	In Force	
Estonia	1996-02-07	In Force	
Eswatini	1979-02-28	In Force	
Ethiopia	1999-03-24	In Force	
Fiji	1974-04-19	In Force	
Finland	1960-05-27	In Force	
France	1969-12-18	In Force	
Gabon	1961-05-29	In Force	
Gambia	2000-09-04	In Force	
Georgia	1996-09-23	In Force	
Germany	1959-06-22	In Force	
Ghana	1958-12-15	In Force	
Greece	1962-03-30	In Force	
Grenada	1979-07-09	In Force	
Guatemala	1959-12-09	In Force	
Guinea	1961-07-11	In Force	
Guinea-Bissau	1977-02-21	In Force	
Guyana	1966-06-08	In Force	
Haiti	1958-03-04	In Force	
Honduras	1958-08-04	In Force	
Hungary	1994-01-04	In Force	
Iceland	1960-11-29	In Force	
India	2000-05-18	In Force	
Indonesia	1999-06-07	In Force	
Iran	1959-04-13	In Force	
Iraq	1959-06-15	In Force	
Ireland	1958-06-11	In Force	
Israel	1958-04-10	In Force	
Italy	1968-03-15	In Force	
Ivory Coast	1961-05-05	In Force	
Jamaica	1962-12-26	In Force	
Japan	2022-07-19	In Force	
Jordan	1958-03-31	In Force	
Kazakhstan	2001-05-18	In Force	
Kenya	1964-01-13	In Force	
Kiribati	2000-02-03	In Force	
Kuwait	1961-09-21	In Force	
Kyrgyzstan	1999-02-18	In Force	
Latvia	1992-01-27	In Force	
Lebanon	1977-06-01	In Force	
Lesotho	2001-06-14	In Force	
Liberia	1962-05-25	In Force	
Libya	1961-06-13	In Force	
Lithuania	1994-09-26	In Force	
Luxembourg	1964-07-24	In Force	
Madagascar	2007-06-06	In Force	
Malawi	1999-11-19	In Force	
Malaysia	1958-10-13	Not in force	Denounced on 10 Jan 1990
Maldives	2013-01-04	In Force	
Mali	1962-05-28	In Force	
Malta	1965-01-04	In Force	
Mauritania	1997-04-03	In Force	
Mauritius	1969-12-02	In Force	
Mexico	1959-06-01	In Force	
Moldova	1993-03-10	In Force	
Mongolia	2005-03-15	In Force	
Montenegro	2006-06-03	In Force	
Morocco	1966-12-01	In Force	
Mozambique	1977-06-06	In Force	
Namibia	2000-11-15	In Force	
Nepal	2007-08-30	In Force	
Netherlands	1959-02-18	In Force	
New Zealand	1968-06-14	In Force	
Nicaragua	1967-10-31	In Force	
Niger	1962-03-23	In Force	
Nigeria	1960-10-17	In Force	
North Macedonia	2003-07-15	In Force	
Norway	1958-04-14	In Force	
Oman	2005-07-21	In Force	
Pakistan	1960-02-15	In Force	
Panama	1966-05-16	In Force	
Papua New Guinea	1976-05-01	In Force	
Paraguay	1968-05-16	In Force	
Peru	1960-12-06	In Force	
Philippines	1960-11-17	In Force	
Poland	1958-07-30	In Force	
Portugal	1959-11-23	In Force	
Qatar	2007-02-02	In Force	
Romania	1998-08-03	In Force	
Russia	1998-07-02	In Force	
Rwanda	1962-09-18	In Force	
Saint Kitts and Nevis	2000-10-12	In Force	
Saint Lucia	1980-05-14	In Force	
Saint Vincent and the Grenadines	1998-10-21	In Force	
Samoa	2008-06-30	In Force	
San Marino	1995-02-01	In Force	
São Tomé and Príncipe	2005-05-04	In Force	
Saudi Arabia	1978-06-15	In Force	
Senegal	1961-07-28	In Force	
Serbia	2003-07-10	In Force	
Seychelles	1978-02-06	In Force	
Sierra Leone	1961-06-13	In Force	
Singapore	1965-10-25	Not in force	Denounced on 19 Apr 1979
Slovakia	1997-09-29	In Force	
Slovenia	1997-06-24	In Force	
Solomon Islands	2012-04-13	In Force	
Somalia	1961-12-08	In Force	
South Africa	1997-03-05	In Force	
South Sudan	2012-04-29	In Force	
Spain	1967-11-06	In Force	
Sri Lanka	2003-01-07	In Force	
Sudan	1970-10-22	In Force	
Suriname	1976-06-15	In Force	
Sweden	1958-06-02	In Force	
Switzerland	1958-07-18	In Force	
Syria	1958-10-23	In Force	
Tajikistan	1999-09-23	In Force	
Tanzania	1962-01-30	In Force	
Thailand	1969-12-02	In Force	
Togo	1999-07-10	In Force	
Trinidad and Tobago	1963-05-24	In Force	
Tunisia	1959-01-12	In Force	
Turkmenistan	1997-05-15	In Force	
Turkey	1961-03-29	In Force	
Uganda	1963-06-04	In Force	
Ukraine	2000-12-14	In Force	
United Arab Emirates	1997-02-24	In Force	
United Kingdom	1957-12-30	In Force	
United States	1991-09-25	In Force	
Uruguay	1968-11-22	In Force	
Uzbekistan	1997-12-15	In Force	
Vanuatu	2006-08-28	In Force	
Venezuela	1964-11-16	In Force	
Vietnam	2020-07-14	In Force	
Yemen	1969-04-14	In Force	
Zambia	1965-02-22	In Force	
Zimbabwe	1998-08-27	In Force	
