= Invalidity, Old-Age and Survivors' Benefits Convention, 1967 =

International Labour Organization Convention

C128
- ILO Convention
- Date of adoption: 29 June 1967
- Date in force: 1 November 1969
- Classification: Old-age, Invalidity and Survivors Benefit
- Subject: Social Security
- Previous: Maximum Weight Convention, 1967
- Next: Labour Inspection (Agriculture) Convention, 1969

Invalidity, Old-Age and Survivors' Benefits Convention, 1967 is an International Labour Organization Convention.

It was established in 1967, with the preamble stating:

Having decided upon the adoption of certain proposals with regard to the revision of the Old-Age Insurance (Industry, etc.) Convention, 1933, the Old-Age Insurance (Agriculture) Convention, 1933, the Invalidity Insurance (Industry, etc.) Convention, 1933, the Invalidity Insurance (Agriculture) Convention, 1933, the Survivors' Insurance (Industry, etc.) Convention, 1933, and the Survivors' Insurance (Agriculture) Convention, 1933,...

== Modification ==
The convention is a revision of:

- Convention C35 – Old-Age Insurance (Industry, etc.) Convention, 1933 (shelved).
- Convention C36 – Old-Age Insurance (Agriculture) Convention, 1933 (shelved).
- Convention C37 – Invalidity Insurance (Industry, etc.) Convention, 1933 (shelved).
- Convention C38 – Invalidity Insurance (Agriculture) Convention, 1933 (shelved).
- Convention C40 – Survivors' Insurance (Agriculture) Convention, 1933 (shelved).

== Ratifications ==
As of 2023, the convention has been ratified by 17 states.

Country	Date	Status
Austria	04 Nov 1969	In Force
Barbados	15 Sep 1972	In Force
Bolivia	31 Jan 1977	In Force
Cyprus	07 Jan 1969	In Force
Czech Republic	01 Jan 1993	In Force
Ecuador	05 Apr 1978	In Force
Finland	13 Jan 1976	In Force
Germany	15 Jan 1971	In Force
Libya	19 Jun 1975	In Force
Netherlands	27 Oct 1969	In Force
Norway	01 Nov 1968	In Force
Slovakia	01 Jan 1993	In Force
Sweden	26 Jul 1968	In Force
Switzerland	13 Sep 1977	In Force
Uruguay	28 Jun 1973	In Force
Venezuela	01 Dec 1983	In Force
