= Fee-Charging Employment Agencies Convention, 1933 (shelved) =

International Labour Organization Convention

C34
- ILO Convention
- Date of adoption: June 29, 1933
- Date in force: November 18, 1936
- This Convention has been "shelved".
- Classification: Employment Services - Job Placement
- Subject: Employment policy and Promotion
- Previous: Minimum Age (Non-Industrial Employment) Convention, 1932
- Next: Old-Age Insurance (Industry, etc.) Convention, 1933 (shelved)

Fee-Charging Employment Agencies Convention, 1933 (shelved) is an International Labour Organization Convention.

It was established in 1933:

Having decided upon the adoption of certain proposals with regard to fee-charging employment agencies,...

== Modification ==
The concepts included in the convention were revised and included in ILO Convention C96, Fee-Charging Employment Agencies Convention (Revised), 1949.

== Ratifications ==
Prior to its shelving, this convention had been ratified by 11 states.
