= Old-Age Insurance (Industry, etc.) Convention, 1933 (shelved) =

International Labour Organization Convention

C35
- ILO Convention
- Date of adoption: June 29, 1933; 91 years ago
- Date in force: July 18, 1937
- This Convention has been "shelved".
- Subject: Social Security
- Previous: Fee-Charging Employment Agencies Convention, 1933 (shelved)
- Next: Old-Age Insurance (Agriculture) Convention, 1933 (shelved)

Old-Age Insurance (Industry, etc.) Convention, 1933 (shelved) is an International Labour Organization Convention.

It was established in 1933:

Having decided upon the adoption of certain proposals with regard to compulsory old-age insurance,...

== Modification ==
The concepts contained in the convention were revised and included in ILO Convention C128, Invalidity, Old-Age and Survivors' Benefits Convention, 1967.

== Ratifications ==
Prior to it being shelved, the convention was ratified by 11 states.
