= Invalidity Insurance (Agriculture) Convention, 1933 (shelved) =

International Labour Organization Convention

C38
- ILO Convention
- Date of adoption: June 29, 1933
- Date in force: July 18, 1937
- This Convention has been "shelved".
- Classification: Old-age, Invalidity and Survivors Benefit
- Subject: Social Security
- Previous: Invalidity Insurance (Industry, etc.) Convention, 1933 (shelved)
- Next: Survivors' Insurance (Industry, etc.) Convention, 1933 (shelved)

Invalidity Insurance (Agriculture) Convention, 1933 (shelved) is an International Labour Organization Convention.

It was established in 1933:

Having decided upon the adoption of certain proposals with regard to compulsory invalidity insurance,...

== Content ==
The six ILO Conventions (Nos. 35–40) adopted in 1933 on old-age, invalidity, and survivors' insurance all contain similar provisions that contain a non-discrimination obligation. As a rule, aliens shall have the same contribution obligations and entitlement to benefit as nationals, regardless of whether their country has ratified the Convention or is even a member of the ILO.

== Modification ==
The concepts included in the convention were revised and included in ILO Convention C128, Invalidity, Old-Age and Survivors' Benefits Convention, 1967.

== Ratifications ==
Prior to its being shelved, the convention had been ratified by ten states.
