= SnapTag =

2D mobile barcode

SnapTag, invented by SpyderLynk, is a 2D mobile barcode alternative similar to a QR code, but that uses an icon or company logo and code ring rather than a square pattern of black dots.

Similar to a QR code, SnapTags can be used to take consumers to a brand’s website, but can also facilitate mobile purchases, coupon downloads, free sample requests, video views, promotional entries, Facebook Likes, Pinterest Pins, Twitter Follows, Posts and Tweets. SnapTags offer back-end data mining capabilities.

== Use in mobile operating systems ==
SnapTags can be used in Google's mobile Android operating system and iOS devices (iPhone/iPod/iPad) using The SnapTag Reader App or third party apps that have integrated the SnapTag Reader SDK. SnapTags can also be used by standard camera phones by taking a picture of the SnapTag and texting it to the designated short code or email address.
