= ATA Carnet =

International customs document

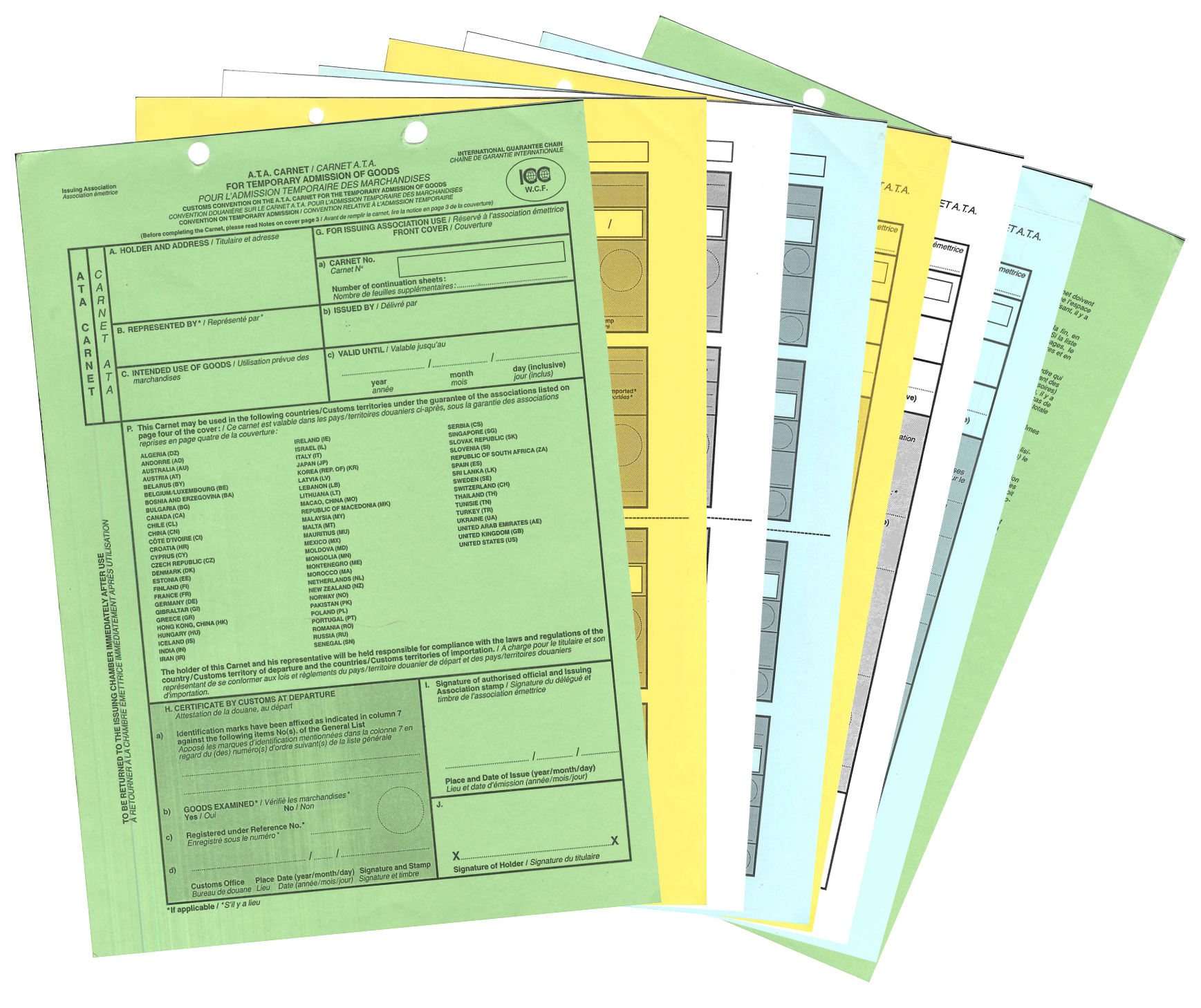
- Main pages of a paper ATA Carnet
- Type: International customs document
- First issued: 30 July 1963
- Purpose: Tax-free and duty-free temporary admission of nonperishable goods into multiple countries
- Valid in: Over 80 countries and customs territories
- Expiration: 1 year after issuance (max)

The ATA Carnet, often referred to as the "Passport for goods", is an international customs document used for the temporary admission of eligible goods intended for re-exportation, with conditional relief from import duties and taxes. It serves both as a Customs declaration and as an international financial guarantee and may be used for multiple Customs operations and journeys during its period of validity, subject to the rules of the Customs territories concerned. The acronym ATA is a combination of French and English terms "Admission Temporaire/Temporary Admission".

The international legal framework is administered by the World Customs Organization (WCO), while the international ATA guarantee chain is administered by the International Chamber of Commerce (ICC) through its World Chambers Federation.

== Carnet usage ==
ATA Carnets allow businesses and individuals to use a single customs document for the temporary export, import and transit of certain categories of goods through customs in several countries or customs territories, without depositing import duties and taxes at each border or providing separate temporary import bonds. They are commonly used by exhibitors at trade fairs, salespeople carrying commercial samples, professional equipment users such as television crews and technicians, artists, athletes, event participants and other travellers carrying goods for temporary use abroad.

In practice, an ATA Carnet accompanies the goods through the different stages of a temporary admission journey. The carnet is generally presented to Customs when the goods leave the customs territory of departure, when they enter and leave each foreign customs territory, and when they return to the territory of departure. Customs records the relevant exportation, importation, re-exportation, re-importation or transit operation on the carnet. The same carnet may be used for multiple journeys during its period of validity, subject to the applicable Customs requirements and the number of available transaction sections.

The validity of the Carnet and the period allowed for a particular temporary admission are not necessarily the same. When goods are temporarily admitted, Customs may set a final date for their re-exportation that is earlier than the Carnet's expiry date. The holder must comply with the period fixed by Customs for that admission, even if the Carnet itself remains valid.

The main benefits of an ATA Carnet include:

- simplifying customs clearance in the countries of export, import and transit by replacing customs documents that would otherwise be required;
- providing an internationally recognised financial guarantee for customs duties and taxes that may become payable if the conditions of temporary admission are not met;
- reducing the need to provide separate temporary import bonds, cash deposits or other securities in each country visited;
- helping users overcome language barriers and unfamiliar national customs forms.

ATA Carnets are intended for goods that will be re-exported, rather than consumed, disposed of or sold abroad. They are generally not suitable for consumable or disposable goods, or for goods intended for sale in the country of temporary admission. A carnet also does not replace any export licence, import permit or other regulatory approval that may be required for controlled goods.

The carnet holder remains responsible for ensuring that the goods are presented to Customs when required, re-exported within the permitted period, and not sold, consumed or otherwise diverted without Customs authorisation. Failure to re-export all or some of the goods listed on the carnet may result in a claim for applicable duties, taxes and possible penalties under the international guarantee system.

The holder should ensure that each Customs operation has been properly recorded before leaving the Customs office. In the paper procedure, the stamped counterfoils retained in the Carnet provide evidence of the corresponding Customs operations. In the digital procedure, committed Customs transactions are recorded in the Carnet's transaction history. Evidence that goods have been properly re-exported or re-imported may be important if the temporary admission is subsequently questioned or a Customs claim is raised.

Operational conditions are not identical in every country or customs territory participating in the ATA Carnet system. National arrangements may differ as to the categories of goods accepted, authorised Customs offices and opening hours, languages and translation requirements, transit, postal or unaccompanied traffic, split consignments, replacement carnets and procedures for regularising an improperly discharged carnet. The conditions applicable to a particular movement therefore depend on the customs territories included in the itinerary.

=== Discharge and claims ===
A temporary admission operation is normally discharged when the goods are re-exported within the period fixed by Customs and the corresponding re-exportation is properly recorded. The subsequent re-importation record provides evidence that the goods returned to the customs territory of departure.

Where the required Customs endorsement or electronic transaction is missing, the holder may be asked to provide alternative evidence that the goods were re-exported or otherwise dealt with in accordance with the applicable Customs rules. The forms of evidence accepted and the procedures for regularising an improperly discharged carnet vary between customs territories.

If Customs cannot establish that the conditions of temporary admission were fulfilled, it may claim the applicable import duties and taxes from the National Guaranteeing Association in its territory. The claim is handled through the international guarantee chain and may ultimately result in the holder being required to reimburse the sums paid on their behalf.

Although re-exportation is the normal means of terminating temporary admission, Customs may in certain circumstances authorise another treatment of the goods, such as release for home use following payment of the applicable duties and taxes. The procedures and conditions depend on the law of the customs territory concerned.

== Obtaining an ATA Carnet ==
ATA Carnets are issued through authorised issuing associations in participating countries and customs territories. Issuing associations are commonly chambers of commerce or other organisations authorised to issue Carnets by the National Guaranteeing Association, with the consent of the relevant Customs authorities. Application procedures, issuing charges and any security required from the applicant are determined nationally and therefore vary between issuing countries and organisations.

Use of a Carnet avoids the need for the holder to provide separate customs security for import duties and taxes in each country visited. It does not, however, mean that the Carnet itself is issued free of charge. An issuing association may charge an issuing fee and may require the applicant to provide security against potential claims under the international guarantee system. The form and amount of such security, and the fees charged for issuing the Carnet, vary according to the issuing country and association.

== ATA Carnet format and composition ==
ATA Carnets are issued in two formats: the traditional paper-based document and the digital eATA Carnet, whose operational rollout began on 1 June 2026. While the paper system is expected to remain in use until the end of 2027, the digital system is designed to eventually replace paper entirely by 1 January 2028.

=== Paper ATA Carnet composition ===
The paper ATA Carnet comprises a front and back cover within which are counterfoils and vouchers for each country to be visited or transited. The vouchers serve as Customs declarations and are detached and retained by Customs. The corresponding counterfoils remain in the carnet and provide the holder with evidence of the Customs operations recorded. Paper ATA Carnets are in A4 paper format.

- Covering pages
  - These pages contain all information about goods, users, issuing data, guaranteeing associations and notes on the usage.
  - They are kept in the Carnet at all times.
- Counterfoils
  - Counterfoils remain in the Carnet and provide the holder with a record of the Customs operations performed. There are three types, distinguished by colour: exportation/re-importation (yellow), importation/re-exportation (white), and transit (blue).
- Vouchers
  - Vouchers serve as Customs declarations and are detached from the Carnet and retained by Customs. There are five types: yellow exportation and re-importation vouchers, white importation and re-exportation vouchers, and blue transit vouchers. Each voucher is accompanied by the General List of goods.

Each ATA Carnet contains a General List identifying the goods covered by the document. It normally records information such as the description, quantity, weight, value and country of origin of each item and, where appropriate, identifying details such as serial numbers. Customs may use the General List to identify the goods during exportation, importation, re-exportation, re-importation and transit operations. Individual journeys may involve all or only some of the goods on the General List, subject to the applicable Customs requirements.

=== Digital ATA Carnet (eATA) ===
The digital ATA Carnet, or eATA Carnet, is the electronic form of the ATA Carnet. Instead of relying solely on the physical carnet and its paper vouchers and counterfoils, the digital system records carnet data, customs declarations and Customs transactions electronically. Holders and authorised representatives access digital carnets through the ATA Carnet App or ATA Carnet Desktop, while Customs authorities process transactions through the ATA Carnet Customs system.

When a digital carnet is issued, the holder receives credentials consisting of a Carnet ID and PIN, which are used to download the carnet into the holder's digital wallet. These credentials are distinct from the transaction codes subsequently used for Customs declarations. A digital carnet may be accessed from more than one compatible device, with carnet information and prepared travels synchronised through the central system.

Rather than using a single QR code for all customs operations, eATA generates transaction-specific QR codes. Before presenting the carnet to Customs, the holder or an authorised representative prepares a travel declaration, specifying the itinerary and selecting the goods from the carnet's General List that are being carried on that journey. The declaration is then digitally signed, after which the system generates the transaction codes required for the relevant Customs operations. This also allows different subsets of the goods listed on a carnet to be used for different journeys, subject to the applicable Customs rules.

Digital signing records the identity of the individual signing the carnet or declaration and their consent to it. Carnet holders may also authorise representatives to handle digital declarations, either by giving them access to the digital carnet or by preparing and signing a declaration in advance and sharing the corresponding transaction code. Digital signing does not replace the authority of Customs to determine whether an individual is entitled to act for the carnet holder; where applicable, Customs may require evidence of authorisation, such as a power of attorney.

When Customs commits a digital transaction, it is recorded centrally in the carnet's transaction history. This provides the digital record of customs movements that, in the paper procedure, are evidenced by stamped counterfoils.

During the worldwide transition from paper to digital carnets, the two formats may coexist within the same journey. Where a customs territory continues to process an ATA Carnet exclusively on paper, the physical Customs endorsement remains the record of that operation; such a paper-only transaction is not automatically recorded as a digital Customs transaction. Journeys involving both digitally enabled and paper-only customs territories may therefore require the holder to use both formats.

=== Replacement and duplicate carnets ===
A duplicate Carnet may be issued when a paper Carnet has been lost, destroyed or stolen. It is issued in place of the original document and retains the same expiry date. In the digital environment, a duplicate is normally unnecessary because the digital Carnet remains stored in the system and can be downloaded again to another compatible device.

A replacement Carnet serves a different purpose. It may be issued where the temporary admission of the goods is expected to continue beyond the validity of the original Carnet. Acceptance of a replacement is subject to the requirements of the Customs authorities concerned and is not automatic. Where replacement is permitted, the necessary arrangements generally need to be made before the original Carnet expires.

Procedures for replacement Carnets vary between customs territories. Holders requiring additional time should therefore contact their issuing association and the relevant Customs authority before the original Carnet expires.

=== Goods covered by the ATA Carnet ===
Goods commonly moved under ATA Carnets include commercial samples, professional equipment, exhibition goods, machinery, photographic and broadcasting equipment, musical instruments, works of art, jewellery, clothing, medical and scientific equipment, sports equipment and animals admitted for eligible purposes. ATA Carnets do not cover perishable or consumable items, or goods for processing or repair.

The most common uses include, but are not limited to:

- exhibitions and fairs
- professional equipment
- commercial samples and goods for testing purposes
- sports equipment
- goods for educational, scientific or cultural purposes

The purposes for which an ATA Carnet may be used vary between customs territories. Participation in the international guarantee chain does not necessarily mean that a territory accepts carnets for every category of goods covered by the ATA Convention, the Istanbul Convention annexes or national law.

== Administration ==
In every country participating in the ATA Chain, a National Guaranteeing Association (NGA) – approved by its customs administration and the ICC World Chambers Federation (WCF) – administers the operation of the ATA Carnet system. Each participating country or customs territory has a single NGA responsible for guaranteeing to its customs administration the payment of import duties and taxes due in cases of non-compliance with temporary admission procedures. Under the ATA system, NGA liability may reach up to 110% of the applicable duties and taxes. With the prior consent of its customs administration, an NGA may authorise local chambers or other associations to issue ATA Carnets on its behalf.

The ATA Carnet system operates through cooperation between customs authorities and the network of NGAs forming the international ATA guarantee chain. While the ATA Convention and Istanbul Convention establish the legal framework for temporary admission, the financial and administrative relationships between NGAs are governed by separate ATA Chain instruments administered by the ICC World Chambers Federation.

Within the ICC World Chambers Federation, the World ATA Carnet Council (WATAC) brings together NGAs from all countries and customs territories participating in the ATA Chain and serves as a forum for coordinating the operation, integrity and expansion of the system.

The principal participants in the system are:

- the carnet holder, in whose name the carnet is issued and who remains responsible for compliance with its conditions;
- an authorised representative, who may present the carnet and goods to Customs on the holder's behalf where permitted;
- the issuing association, which processes the application and issues the carnet;
- the National Guaranteeing Association, which guarantees the applicable duties and taxes to its national Customs administration;
- national Customs authorities, which process the relevant temporary admission operations and may raise claims where the conditions are not fulfilled;
- the World Customs Organization, which administers the international customs conventions underlying the system; and
- the International Chamber of Commerce through its World Chambers Federation, which administers the international ATA guarantee chain.

== Member countries of the ATA Carnet guarantee scheme ==
Countries and customs territories covered by the ICC ATA Carnet international guarantee chain

Updated 2 June 2026

In the early 1960s, the ATA Carnet was in use in Ivory Coast, France, Yugoslavia, Switzerland and Czechoslovakia. By 1982, the system had expanded to 36 countries.

Today, the ATA Carnet guarantee scheme is in force in over 80 countries and customs territories through a network of national guaranteeing associations forming the international ATA guaranteeing chain.

The system is valid across the European Union, which operates as a single customs territory, as well as in the following countries and territories: Albania, Algeria, Andorra, Australia, Bahrain, Belarus, Bosnia and Herzegovina, Canada, Chile, China, Côte d'Ivoire, Gibraltar, Hong Kong, Iceland, India, Indonesia, Iran, Ireland, Israel, Japan, Kazakhstan, South Korea, Lebanon, Macao, North Macedonia, Madagascar, Malaysia, Mauritius, Mexico, Moldova, Mongolia, Montenegro, Morocco, New Zealand, Norway, Pakistan, Peru, the Philippines, Qatar, Russia, Saudi Arabia, Senegal, Serbia, Singapore, South Africa, Sri Lanka, Switzerland, Thailand, Tunisia, Türkiye, Ukraine, the United Arab Emirates, the United Kingdom, the United States and Vietnam.

Brazil was a member country from 2016 until 31 December 2021, when its national guaranteeing association stepped down and no replacement was appointed.

Participation in the ATA Carnet system is operationally defined by the existence of a national guaranteeing association within the international ATA guaranteeing chain. In certain cases, coverage extends beyond the listed country to associated territories or customs arrangements administered by that guaranteeing association.

=== List of National Guaranteeing Associations ===
The following is a list of National Guaranteeing Associations members of the ICC ATA Guarantee Chain and their covered territories.

National Guaranteeing Association	Territories covered	NGA operational start date	Website
Alliance des Chambres de Commerce Suisses	Switzerland Liechtenstein (Note: The Istanbul Convention applies to Liechtenstein for as long as it is linked to Switzerland by a customs union treaty.)	1963-07-01	www.ataswiss.ch
Association of Lithuanian Chambers of Commerce, Industry and Crafts	Lithuania	2000-08-21	www.chambers.lt
Athens Chamber of Commerce and Industry	Greece	1976-07-01	www.acci.gr
Austrian Federal Economic Chamber	Austria	Unconfirmed (Note: Austria's operational start date remains unconfirmed. 20 May 1963 is the ATA Convention accession date; treaty entry into force was 21 August 1963. Affiliation documents were still being processed on 27 June 1963, when the Austrian National Committee submitted the Finance Ministry decree and the ECS/ATA Statement (with a reservation to Article 6(e)). Operations likely aligned with either the global ATA Convention entry into force (30 July 1963) or Switzerland's confirmed start (1 July 1963). ECS continuity is confirmed: Austria participated in the bilateral Austria–Switzerland commercial-samples triptyque from 1 February 1954, was among the first ECS Convention signatories (1957), and its 1963 Chamber correspondence explicitly states that the commitment previously required from ECS Carnet holders would also be required before issuing ATA Carnets. No separate BIICC "ATA System effective as from [date]" notice has been found.)	www.wko.at
Bahrain Chamber of Commerce and Industry	Bahrain	2014-06-01	www.bahrainchamber.bh
Belarusian Chamber of Commerce and Industry (BelCCI)	Belarus	2004-08-15	www.cci.by
Board of Trade of Thailand	Thailand	1995-02-01	www.thaichamber.org
Canadian Chamber of Commerce	Canada	1972-11-01	www.chamber.ca
Chamber of Commerce and Industry of Romania	Romania	1967-06-08 (Note: Ministry of Foreign Trade authorisation date; no ICC entry-into-force circular found. Chain formalities completed September 1967.) (Note: Date based on best available archival evidence; no formal ICC/IBCC "Implementation as of" circular found in the sources consulted. Treat as approximate.)	www.ccir.ro
Chamber of Commerce and Industry of Serbia	Serbia	2004-11-01	www.pks.rs
Chamber of Commerce and Industry of Slovenia	Slovenia	1993-05-01	www.gzs.si
Chamber of Commerce and Industry of the Republic of Moldova	Moldova	2010-07-01	chamber.md
Chamber of Commerce and Industry of the Russian Federation	Russia	2000-05-15	www.tpprf.ru
Chamber of Commerce, Industry and Agriculture of Beirut and Mount Lebanon	Lebanon	1996-01-15	www.ccib.org.lb
Chamber of Commerce, d'Industrie et de Services Casablanca–Settat	Morocco	1998-07-01 (Note: ICC article confirms "The ATA Carnet System for the duty and tax-free temporary admission of goods entered into force in Morocco in 1998." Specific date 1 July 1998 from internal ICC/IBCC archive.)	www.cciscs.ma
Chamber of Economy of Montenegro	Montenegro	2008-12-01 (Note: "Montenegro will become the 66th country to join the ATA Carnet System on 1 December 2008." ICC WCF newsroom, 2008.)	www.privrednakomora.me
Chamber of International Commerce of Kazakhstan	Kazakhstan	2017-04-01	kazcic.kz
Chambre algérienne de Commerce et d'Industrie	Algeria	1991-01-15	www.caci.dz
Chambre de Commerce d'Industrie et d'Agriculture de Dakar (CCIAD)	Senegal	1978-07-25	www.cciad.sn
Chambre de Commerce et d'Industrie de Côte d'Ivoire	Ivory Coast	1963-07-01 (Note: ECS continuity confirmed: the 1963 letter confirming the ATA start explicitly cites the 1952 Geneva Samples Convention (the ECS basis) and the 1961 Brussels Conventions, and Ivory Coast appeared in the unified ECS/ATA Systems statement in 1963, confirming prior operation within the international guarantee framework before ATA was operational. Suspended from IBCC/ATA chain 6 October 1995; re-integrated 15 January 1997.)	www.cci.ci
Chambre de Commerce et d'Industrie de Tunis	Tunisia	1998-06-01	www.ccitunis.org.tn
Chambre de Commerce et d'Industrie de région Paris Île-de-France	France (Note: Includes mainland France, Monaco, Corsica, French off-shore islands, overseas departments (Guadeloupe, French Guiana, Martinique, Réunion), overseas territories, and collectivités territoriales of Saint Pierre and Miquelon and Mayotte.) Monaco (Note: Monaco is covered under the French NGA.)	1965-01-01 (Note: Phased implementation. ATA Convention accession: 20 December 1962 (French NGA signed guarantee letter in 1962, accepting pilot carnets to ensure simultaneity with foreign partners). Commercial samples handled exclusively under ECS for French-issued documents during transition; incoming samples accepted under ATA or ECS. Customs instructions published 2 December 1964; French issuance for exhibitions/fairs/congresses/similar events began 1 January 1965. Date shown is start of French issuance.)	www.entreprises.cci-paris-idf.fr
Chambre de Commerce, d'Industrie et de Services d'Andorre	Andorra	1998-12-02	www.ccis.ad
China Council for the Promotion of International Trade (CCPIT)	China	1998-03-01	www.eatachina.com
Croatian Chamber of Economy	Croatia	1996-11-01	www.hgk.hr
Cyprus Chamber of Commerce and Industry	Cyprus	1977-01-25	www.ccci.org.cy
Cámara Oficial de Comercio, Industria, Servicios y Navegación de España	Spain (Note: Includes Canary Islands, Ceuta and Melilla.)	1964-12-15	www.camara.es
Câmara de Comércio e Industria Portuguesa	Portugal	1966-07-20	www.ccip.pt
Danish Chamber of Commerce	Denmark (Note: Includes Faroe Islands; does not cover Greenland.)	1965-01-01 (Note: Pre-ratification administrative start; Danish Ministry of Finance announced introduction from 1 January 1965, noting ratification would follow. WCO PG0233E1 formal deposit date: 14 April 1965.)	www.danskerhverv.dk
Deutsche Industrie- und Handelskammer (DIHK)	Germany	1962-10-24 (Note: Earliest administrative authorisation date: Bundesminister der Finanzen letter of 24 October 1962 authorising Deutscher Industrie- und Handelstag as ATA issuing and guaranteeing association. No separate ICC/BIICC implementation circular found. Germany also signed the joint ECS/ATA Statement (BIICC Document 550/286), confirming prior operation under the ECS Carnet chain. WCO PG0233E1 formal ATA Convention accession date: 15 October 1965. Treat as date-type mismatch, not error.)	www.dihk.de
Dubai Chamber of Commerce	United Arab Emirates	2011-04-01	www.dubaichamber.com
Dublin Chamber of Commerce	Ireland	1965-07-17 (Note: Approximate: 15 days after Dublin Chamber letter of 2 July 1965, per the Chamber's own formula.)	www.dublinchamber.ie
Economic Chamber of North Macedonia	North Macedonia	1998-07-01	www.mchamber.mk
Economic Chamber of the Czech Republic	Czech Republic	1993-01-15	www.komora.cz
Estonian Chamber of Commerce and Industry	Estonia	1996-11-15	www.koda.ee
Federation of Indian Chambers of Commerce and Industry (FICCI)	India	1990-08-15	www.atacarnet.in
Federation of Israeli Chambers of Commerce	Israel	1966-11-25	www.chamber.org.il
Foreign Trade Chamber of Bosnia and Herzegovina	Bosnia and Herzegovina	2011-04-18	www.komorabih.ba
Fédération des Chambres de Commerce belges (Belgian Chambers)	Belgium Luxembourg (Note: Luxembourg is covered under the Belgium–Luxembourg Economic Union (UEBL). Belgium deliberately delayed joining the ATA chain until Luxembourg had completed its formalities, so that the UEBL could operate as a single territory from 1 December 1966.)	1966-12-01 (Note: Date of UEBL Customs acceptance of foreign ATA Carnets, per Belgian NGA (FCCIB) letter of 3 November 1966. Belgium waited for Luxembourg to complete formalities before joining as a single UEBL territory. Issuance of Belgian/Luxembourg ATA Carnets likely commenced in tandem; a separate issuance-start notice has not yet been found.)	www.belgianchambers.be
Fédération des Chambres de Commerce et d'Industrie de Madagascar	Madagascar	2013-04-22	www.federationccimada.org
Gibraltar Chamber of Commerce	Gibraltar	≤ 1969 (Note: UK territorial application of the ATA Convention to Gibraltar was registered by the UN Treaty Collection on 11 February 1969 (UN Treaty Series vol. 658, treaty no. 6864). The BIICC member-country list (Document 550-1/948) independently records Gibraltar with the year 1969, consistent with the UN registration date. The Gibraltar Chamber of Commerce had signed chain documentation in November 1963 but stated that operation awaited UK Government notification to the Customs Co-operation Council; this notification was not made until 1969. Date shown is the year of confirmed chain membership; exact date within 1969 not yet confirmed from archive.)	
Hungarian Chamber of Commerce and Industry	Hungary	1967-02-15	www.mkik.hu
ICC Pakistan	Pakistan	2007-10-01	www.iccpakistan.com.pk
ICC Sri Lanka	Sri Lanka	1982-12-01	www.iccsrilanka.com
Iceland Chamber of Commerce	Iceland	1971-03-08 (Note: Date Professional Equipment and Exhibitions/Fairs Conventions entered into force for Iceland per CCC notification; Ministry recognised Iceland Chamber of Commerce as NGA on 2 March 1971.)	www.chamber.is
Indonesian Chamber of Commerce and Industry (KADIN Indonesia)	Indonesia	2015-05-15	www.kadin.id
Iran Chamber of Commerce, Industries and Mines (ICCIM)	Iran	1976-12-05 (Note: Original operational start. System interrupted post-1979 Islamic Revolution; reintroduced 15 November 2005 as the 63rd guaranteeing organisation.)	www.iccimtir.org
JCAA – Japan Commercial Arbitration Association	Japan	1973-11-01	www.jcaa.or.jp
Korea Chamber of Commerce and Industry	South Korea	1979-04-01	cert.korcham.net
Latvian Chamber of Commerce and Industry	Latvia	2001-01-15	www.chamber.lv
Lima Chamber of Commerce	Peru	2024-04-30	www.camaralima.org.pe
London Chamber of Commerce and Industry	United Kingdom (Note: Includes Guernsey, Isle of Man and Jersey.)	1963-07-19 (Note: Accession date per UK country sheet; no separate ICC entry-into-force notice found. Legal treaty entry-into-force may be 19 October 1963 under ATA Convention Article 21.)	uknataco.co.uk
Macao Chamber of Commerce	Macau	2010-11-01	www.acm.org.mo
Malaysian International Chamber of Commerce and Industry	Malaysia	1989-04-15	www.micci.com
Mexico City National Chamber of Commerce (CANACO)	Mexico	2011-05-16	www.carnet-ata.org
Mongolian National Chamber of Commerce and Industry	Mongolia	2004-04-15	www.mongolchamber.mn
Oslo Chamber of Commerce	Norway	1964-12-02 (Note: Date of Norwegian Customs recognition of Oslo Chamber; legal ATA Convention entry into force for Norway: 30 July 1963.)	www.chamber.no
Philippine Chamber of Commerce and Industry (PCCI)	Philippines	2024-07-15	www.philippinechamber.com
Polish Chamber of Commerce	Poland	1971-02-01 (Note: Requested BIICC chain affiliation date; national Ministerial Order authorisation had retroactive effect from 20 October 1969.)	www.kig.pl
Qatar Chamber of Commerce and Industry	Qatar	2018-08-01	qatarchamber.com
Santiago Chamber of Commerce	Chile	2005-10-01	www.ccs.cl
Singapore International Chamber of Commerce	Singapore	1984-07-01	www.sicc.com.sg
Slovak Chamber of Commerce and Industry	Slovakia	1993-01-15 (Note: State-succession/continuity: Slovak Republic continued applying former Czechoslovak ATA framework from 1 January 1993. WCO PG0233E1 formal accession date: 5 February 1993.)	www.sopk.sk
South African Chamber of Commerce and Industry (SACCI)	South Africa Botswana Namibia Eswatini Lesotho (Note: SACCI acts as NGA for the Southern African Customs Union (SACU), covering Botswana, Lesotho, Namibia and Eswatini in addition to South Africa.)	1976-06-01	www.sacci.org.za
Taiwan External Trade Development Council (TAITRA)	Chinese Taipei (Note: Taiwan participates as "Chinese Taipei" through TAITRA under bilateral agreements; it is not a party to the Istanbul Convention or ATA Convention. See CPD/China-Taiwan Carnet.)	1992-03-01 (Note: Separate bilateral CPD/China-Taiwan system, not the standard ATA guarantee chain. Security bond covers Carnets issued from 1 March 1992; IBCC formally accepted guarantee act 27 May 1992.)	www.taiwantrade.com.tw
The Bulgarian Chamber of Commerce and Industry	Bulgaria	1964-11-01 (Note: National customs entry into force date; chain affiliation formalities completed April 1966.)	www.bcci.bg
The Federation of Saudi Chambers	Saudi Arabia	2024-06-01	fsc.org.sa
The Finland Chamber of Commerce	Finland	1964-11-02 (Note: Finnish Board of Customs letter of 1 October 1964 states the ATA Convention "will come into force in Finland on 2.XI.1964" per statute 477/64. Central Chamber of Commerce of Finland signed the IBCC Protocol on 21 October 1964. Finland had signed the ECS/ATA Statement as early as 8 July 1963 as a declaration of intent. Current ATA Manual country page lists 1 August 1964 (accession date); confirmed operational date is 2 November 1964.)	kauppakamari.fi
The Hong Kong General Chamber of Commerce	Hong Kong, China	1974-08-01 (Note: Pre-1997 handover, operated under the United Kingdom's ATA Convention extension. Hong Kong later acceded to the Istanbul Convention as a separate customs territory with effect from 15 May 1995.)	www.chamber.org.hk
The Malta Chamber of Commerce, Enterprise and Industry	Malta	1989-03-15 (Note: Archive document heading states "as from 1 March 1989" but body text gives 15 March 1989; body text preferred.)	www.maltachamber.org.mt
The Mauritius Chamber of Commerce and Industry	Mauritius	1982-11-08	www.mcci.org
The Netherlands Chamber of Commerce and Industry	Netherlands	1964-01-17 (Note: ATA Convention accession date; no separate ICC implementation circular found. Dutch Ministry of Finance had designated the NGA in June 1963. Per the WCO Istanbul Convention Handbook (2006 edition), the Netherlands' territorial application covers "The Kingdom of the Netherlands (The Kingdom in Europe and the Netherlands Antilles)", with the Curaçao Chamber of Commerce as issuing and guaranteeing association for the Netherlands Antilles. Following the dissolution of the Netherlands Antilles in 2010, the current ATA chain status of Curaçao, Sint Maarten and the Caribbean Netherlands has not been independently confirmed from ICC/WATAC sources.)	www.kvk.nl
The Stockholm Chamber of Commerce	Sweden	1964-06-20	www.stockholmshandelskammare.se
Ukrainian Chamber of Commerce and Industry	Ukraine	2008-03-04 (Note: Based on ICC public announcement of 4 March 2008; formal implementation circular not yet found in archive.)	www.ata.ucci.org.ua
Union of Chambers and Commodity Exchanges of Türkiye (TOBB)	Turkey	1975-05-28 (Note: Corrects initially-announced date of 1 April 1975, which was suspended on 16 April 1975 pending completion of financial formalities. BIICC Document 550-1/393 confirmed 28 May 1975.)	www.tobb.org.tr
Union of Chambers of Commerce and Industry of Albania (UCCIAL)	Albania	2013-02-25	www.uccial.al
Unione Italiana delle Camere di Commercio (UNIONCAMERE)	Italy	1964-03-20 (Note: Italian Ministry of Finance authorisation to issue from this date; WCO PG0233E1 formal accession/deposit date: 19 June 1964.)	www.unioncamere.gov.it
United States Council for International Business (USCIB)	United States (Note: Includes Puerto Rico.)	1969-06-30	www.uscib.org
Victorian Chamber of Commerce and Industry	Australia	1970-11-09 (Note: Start of insurance/indemnity coverage for Melbourne Chamber of Commerce ATA Carnet operations. 1969 referenced as organisational introduction phase.)	www.victorianchamber.com.au
Viet Nam Chamber of Commerce and Industry	Vietnam	2022-05-01	atacarnet.covcci.com.vn
Wellington Chamber of Commerce	New Zealand	1978-02-28	www.wecc.org.nz
~~Confederação Nacional da Indústria (CNI)~~	Brazil (operations ceased 1 January 2022)	2016-06-28 (Note: Brazil joined the ATA Carnet system on 28 June 2016 as the 75th guaranteeing organisation. CNI stepped down on 1 January 2022 and no replacement was appointed.)	
Sources: ICC World Chambers Federation; WCO Istanbul Convention Handbook (2006 edition) for territorial application details; ICC/IBCC/WATAC archive documents (iccwbo.sharepoint.com) for operational start dates. Georgia, Trinidad and Tobago, Jordan and Zimbabwe have treaty-accession dates but are not currently active members of the international guarantee chain and are not listed.

== History ==
=== Background ===
Early suggestions for an international temporary admission scheme were made during the 1900 and 1913 Congresses on Customs regulations, examined by Customs experts convened in 1923 under the auspices of the League of Nations, but no positive result was achieved. In 1932 the League of Nations drafted a convention to promote uniform duty-free admission for samples, but it was never implemented owing to WWII.

In 1952, building on the ICC's 1949 report "Invisible Barriers to Trade and Travel", the contracting parties to GATT adopted an International Convention to Facilitate the Importation of Commercial Samples and Advertising Material, proposed and drafted by the ICC. The convention, based on a draft the League of Nations had developed in 1935, came into effect in November 1955.

==== The Austria–Switzerland triptyque ====
During the meetings of the Sixth Session Working Party that prepared the convention's text, the French delegation proposed considering a system of triptyques or carnets for samples carried by commercial travellers, to alleviate the financial and administrative burdens on firms sending representatives abroad. The Working Party was told that such a scheme had already been worked out, on a bilateral basis, between Austria and Switzerland, though it had not yet been put into force. On 1 March 1954 the Austrian Government informed the Executive Secretary of GATT that the scheme had been put into effect by the two countries' Customs Administrations on 1 February 1954: commercial travellers and agents could import samples between Switzerland and Austria temporarily duty-free under a customs triptyque, without depositing import duties, guaranteed by an Austrian insurance company on the Austrian side and a Swiss company on the Swiss side. The scheme was capped at 60,000 Austrian schillings or 10,000 Swiss Francs per collection of samples, with one year allowed for re-exportation.

==== The ECS Carnet ====
ECS Convention
Customs Convention Regarding E.C.S. Carnets for Commercial Samples
- Signed: 1 March 1956
- Location: Brussels, Belgium
- Effective: 3 October 1957
- Original signatories: Original signatories (1956): United Kingdom; West Germany; Austria; Belgium; Denmark; France; Greece; Ireland; Italy; Luxembourg; Norway; Netherlands; Portugal; Sweden; Switzerland; Turkey
- Parties: Sole remaining contracting party: Haiti
- Depositary: Belgian Ministry of Foreign Affairs
- Citations: United Nations, Treaty Series, vol. 343, p. 130, No. 4923
- Languages: English; French
- Registered with the United Nations by the United Kingdom on 12 October 1959. Effectively superseded by the ATA Convention (1961). At its 47th/48th Sessions (June 1976) the Customs Co-operation Council recommended that Contracting Parties denounce the Convention as duplicative of the ATA Convention; 21 instruments of denunciation were subsequently deposited, leaving Haiti as the sole remaining contracting party as of the WCO's most recent status list.

Building on this convention and the Austria–Switzerland triptyque — and reportedly following an initiative of Charles Aubert, director of the Chamber of Commerce, Industry and Services of Geneva and future first director of the Chambres de Commerce Suisses — the Customs Co-operation Council, with the International League of Commercial Travellers and Agents and the ICC's International Information Bureau of Chambers of Commerce, prepared the Customs Convention Regarding the E.C.S. Carnets for Commercial Samples, which entered into force on 3 October 1957. The new convention introduced the E.C.S. Carnet — the initials standing for the bilingual Echantillons Commerciaux/Commercial Samples — an optional substitute for national temporary importation papers that replaced any deposit or guarantee Customs authorities might otherwise require. Its first signatories were West Germany, Austria, Belgium, Denmark, France, the United Kingdom, Ireland, Italy, Luxembourg, Norway, the Netherlands, Portugal, Sweden, Switzerland and Turkey, with the Belgian Ministry of Foreign Affairs acting as depositary.

The international guarantee mechanism behind the ECS Carnet was organised by the International Bureau of Chambers of Commerce (BIICC), a department of the ICC, under BIICC Protocol Document 550/52 of 2 November 1955. This established a chain of national guaranteeing organisations — one per territory, each recognised by its own Customs authority — under which a guarantee was automatically substituted from one country's organisation to the next as goods crossed a border, with a reimbursement procedure between organisations where a claim arose. (Note: Protocol 550/52 itself has not been located in digitised form; its content is inferred from references in chamber adhesion files and from the structurally similar successor instruments described below.)

By 1960 the ECS Carnet's success was clear enough that the Customs Co-operation Council told the GATT Executive Secretary that the "satisfactory results obtained" — 15,600 carnets issued that year, worth a combined US$16,320,000 — had "induced the international trading community to propose that the facilities offered by the ECS Carnet Convention should be extended over the widest possible field", an idea the ICC supported.

=== The ATA Convention ===
ATA Convention
Customs Convention on the A.T.A. Carnet for the Temporary Admission of Goods
- Signed: 6 December 1961
- Location: Brussels, Belgium
- Effective: 30 July 1963
- Parties: List of contracting parties: Algeria; Andorra; Australia; Austria; Belarus; Belgium; Bulgaria; Canada; China; Côte d'Ivoire; Croatia; Cuba; Cyprus; Czech Republic; Denmark; Egypt; Finland; France; Germany; Greece; Hungary; Iceland; India; Iran; Ireland; Israel; Italy; Japan; South Korea; Lebanon; Lesotho; Luxembourg; Malaysia; Malta; Morocco; Mauritius; Mexico; Netherlands; New Zealand; Niger; Nigeria; Norway; Poland; Portugal; Romania; Russian Federation; Senegal; Serbia; Singapore; Slovakia; Slovenia; South Africa; Spain; Sri Lanka; Sweden; Switzerland; Thailand; North Macedonia; Trinidad and Tobago; Tunisia; Turkey; United Kingdom; United States
- Depositary: Customs Cooperation Council
- Languages: English; French

A preliminary enquiry into the usefulness of a temporary duty-free admission document, carried out by the Customs Cooperation Council with GATT, UNESCO and the ICC, found general support for a document on the lines of the ECS carnet that could also cover professional equipment and goods for exhibitions and fairs. Since conventions on those two subjects were already being prepared separately, it was thought desirable for the new carnet convention to be ready alongside them, or as soon as possible afterward. Accordingly, building on the ECS Carnet's success, the Customs Co-operation Council adopted the Customs Convention on the ATA Carnet for the Temporary Admission of Goods in 1961; it entered into force on 30 July 1963. ATA Carnets are regarded as an upgraded version of ECS Carnets, extending the same mechanism beyond commercial samples. More specific conventions were subsequently worked out for each type of applicable good. At its 47th/48th Sessions in June 1976, the Council recommended that Contracting Parties to the ECS Convention denounce it as duplicating the ATA Convention; 21 countries have since deposited instruments of denunciation, leaving Haiti as the sole remaining Contracting Party.

"The States signatory to this Convention, convinced that the adoption of common procedures for the temporary duty-free importation of goods would afford considerable advantages to international commercial and cultural activities and would secure a higher degree of harmony and uniformity in the customs system of the Contracting Parties." – (Preamble of the A.T.A. Convention)

Alongside the Convention itself, the BIICC organised the international ATA guarantee chain through two companion instruments. The Protocol on the organisation of international customs deposits in respect of ATA Carnets (Document 550/212), adopted on 22 January 1962, established reciprocal obligations between participating national guaranteeing organisations. When goods entered another participating customs territory under an ATA Carnet, the guaranteeing organisation in that territory became liable to its customs administration for duties and taxes that could become payable, while reimbursement between organisations was governed by the guarantee-chain arrangements. The companion Statement on the ATA System (Document 550/521), first adopted on 16 March 1980, sets out the chain's terms in more detail — defining the issuing chamber of commerce, the national guaranteeing organisation and the WCF international guaranteeing organisation — and requires beneficiaries to undertake to re-export goods within the time limit, reimburse any sums paid on their behalf, and provide security (an insurance indemnity, bank guarantee or cash deposit) before a Carnet is issued, covering the highest possible import duties plus 10 per cent. Both instruments were revised on 13 September 1988 and again on 7 March 1997, the latter revision reflecting the renaming of the BIICC to the World Chambers Federation (WCF) and of the working party "ATA System" to the World ATA Carnet Council (WATAC).

=== The Istanbul Convention ===
Istanbul Convention
Convention on Temporary Admission
- Signed: 26 June 1990
- Location: Istanbul, Turkey
- Effective: 27 November 1993
- Parties: List of contracting parties: Albania; Algeria; Andorra; Armenia; Australia; Austria; Bahrain; Belarus; Belgium; Bosnia and Herzegovina; Brazil; Bulgaria; Chile; China; Croatia; Cyprus; Czech Republic; Denmark; Estonia; Finland; France; Georgia; Germany; Ghana; Greece; Hong Kong, China; Hungary; Indonesia; Iran; Ireland; Israel; Italy; Jordan; Kazakhstan; Kosovo; Kuwait; Latvia; Lithuania; Luxembourg; Madagascar; Mali; Malta; Mauritius; Moldova; Mongolia; Montenegro; Morocco; Netherlands; Niger; Nigeria; North Macedonia; Oman; Pakistan; Peru; Philippines; Poland; Portugal; Qatar; Romania; Russian Federation; Saudi Arabia; Serbia; Seychelles; Slovakia; Slovenia; South Africa; Spain; Sweden; Switzerland; Tajikistan; Thailand; Trinidad and Tobago; Turkey; Ukraine; United Arab Emirates; United Kingdom; Uzbekistan; Vietnam; Zimbabwe; European Union
- Depositary: World Customs Organization
- Languages: English; French

Between 1950 and 1970 there was a proliferation of international Conventions, Recommendations, Agreements and other instruments on temporary admission, creating confusion for the international business community and complicating the work of Customs. The Istanbul Convention was designed to consolidate the principal international instruments on temporary admission into a single framework. The instruments and provisions addressed included:

1. Customs Convention on the ATA carnet for the temporary admission of goods (ATA Convention), Brussels, 6 December 1961
2. Customs Convention concerning facilities for the importation of goods for display or use at exhibitions, fairs, meetings or similar events, Brussels, 8 June 1961
3. Customs Convention on the temporary importation of professional equipment, Brussels, 8 June 1961
4. European Convention on Customs treatment of pallets used in international transport, Geneva, 9 December 1960
5. Customs Convention on the temporary importation of packings, Brussels, 6 October 1960
6. Articles 2 to 11 and Annexes 1 (paragraphs 1 and 2) to 3 to the Customs Convention on Containers, Geneva, 2 December 1972
7. Articles 3, 5 and 6 (1.b and 2) of the International Convention to facilitate the importation of commercial samples and advertising material, Geneva, 7 November 1952
8. Customs Convention on welfare material for seafarers, Brussels, 1 December 1964
9. Customs Convention on the temporary importation of scientific equipment, Brussels, 11 June 1968
10. Customs Convention on the temporary importation of pedagogic material, Brussels, 8 June 1970
11. Articles 2 and 5 of the Convention concerning Customs facilities for touring, New York, 4 June 1954
12. Additional Protocol to the Convention concerning Customs facilities for touring, relating to the importation of tourist publicity documents and material, New York, 4 June 1954
13. Customs Convention on the temporary importation of private road vehicles, New York, 4 June 1954
14. Customs Convention on the temporary importation of commercial road vehicles, Geneva, 18 May 1956
15. Customs Convention on the temporary importation for private use of aircraft and pleasure boats, Geneva, 18 May 1956

The Convention on Temporary Admission — the Istanbul Convention — was adopted by the WCO on 26 June 1990 and entered into force on 27 November 1993. Its objectives and principles are:

- To devise a single instrument for the simplification and harmonization of temporary admission formalities, replacing all the existing Conventions or Recommendations dealing solely or principally with temporary admission. The subjects covered by the former Conventions are now covered by the Annexes to the Istanbul Convention.
- Each Annex authorizes the temporary admission of goods imported for a specific purpose — for example, Annex B.1 covers goods for display or use at fairs or exhibitions. This avoids the need for any future instrument on temporary admission by creating a framework into which new categories of goods needing temporary admission facilities can be incorporated.
- Goods imported duty-free cannot remain indefinitely in the country of temporary importation. The period fixed for re-exportation is laid down in each Annex.
- The goods must be re-exported in the same state, without undergoing any change during their stay other than normal depreciation due to use.
- Economic prohibitions or restrictions at importation are not applied, since they generally relate to goods cleared for home use and serve as a national protection measure.

List of Annexes of the Istanbul Convention
Annex A	Annex concerning temporary admission papers (ATA Carnets and CPD Carnets)
Annex B.1	Annex concerning goods for display or use at exhibitions, fairs, meetings or similar events
Annex B.2	Annex concerning professional equipment
Annex B.3	Annex concerning containers, pallets, packagings, samples and other goods imported in connection with a commercial operation
Annex B.4	Annex concerning goods imported in connection with a manufacturing operation
Annex B.5	Annex concerning goods imported for educational, scientific or cultural purposes
Annex B.6	Annex concerning travellers' personal effects and goods imported for sports purposes
Annex B.7	Annex concerning tourist publicity material
Annex B.8	Annex concerning goods imported as frontier traffic
Annex B.9	Annex concerning goods imported for humanitarian purposes
Annex C	Annex concerning means of transport
Annex D	Annex concerning animals
Annex E	Annex concerning goods imported with partial relief from import duties and taxes

Annual number of ATA and CPD/China–Taiwan Carnets issued worldwide, including original and replacement carnets where applicable. The decline observed in the early 2000s coincided with the 2004 and 2007 EU enlargements, which eliminated many former external borders where carnets had previously been required. Following the sharp decline caused by the COVID-19 pandemic in 2020, issuance recovered and subsequently exceeded pre-pandemic levels, reaching record highs by 2025, partly reflecting the reintroduction of carnet requirements for many movements between the United Kingdom and the European Union after Brexit. Source: ICC World Chambers Federation (WCF) / World ATA Carnet Council (WATAC) annual survey data. View source data.
Annual total value of goods covered by ATA and CPD/China–Taiwan Carnets worldwide, expressed in billions of US dollars. The series reflects changes in international trade activity, including the impact of the global financial crisis of 2008–2009, the sharp decline caused by the COVID-19 pandemic in 2020, and the subsequent recovery. By 2025, the value of goods covered under carnets had reached a record high of more than US$33 billion. Source: ICC World Chambers Federation (WCF) / World ATA Carnet Council (WATAC) annual survey data. View source data.

=== The digital ATA Carnet ===
The eATA Carnet project digitalises the international ATA Carnet system, managing its entire lifecycle — issuance, declarations, transactions and claims — electronically and in real time. Developed by the ICC starting in 2016, the system is legally enabled by amendments to Article 4 of the ATA Convention and Article 21a of the Istanbul Convention, permitting electronic data-processing techniques.

A pilot phase ran from 2019 until June 2023, including the first digital transaction on 20 October 2019 at Zurich Airport, Switzerland. The system then entered a global transition phase in July 2023, built around the central ATA Carnet Core database and supported by user-facing tools — the ATA Carnet app (a secure digital wallet for holders and representatives) and ATA Carnet Customs (for Customs officers) — enabling paper-free declarations, QR code transactions and virtual voucher reconciliation.

On 1 June 2026, Customs administrations in the European Union, Norway, Switzerland, Liechtenstein and the United Kingdom officially began recognising digital carnets as legally valid; other administrations are expected to adopt the system by the end of 2027. Within the first month following the launch of the system, nearly 24,000 border transactions had been completed using digital carnets across the European Union, the United Kingdom, Norway and Switzerland.

Event	Date	Time (UTC)	Location	Country
First validation	1 June 2026	08:38	Basel/Weil am Rhein-Autobahn Customs Office	Switzerland
First exportation	1 June 2026	09:23	Bristol Airport	United Kingdom
First importation	1 June 2026	10:36	Weil am Rhein-Autobahn Customs Office	Germany
First re-exportation	3 June 2026	15:46	St Pancras International	United Kingdom
First re-importation	3 June 2026	08:39	Zollamt Schweinfurt – Londonstraße	Germany
First transit open	3 June 2026	09:28	Zollstelle Lustenau	Austria
First transit close	4 June 2026	10:06	Göteborg	Sweden

== Legal framework ==
Contracting parties to the 1961 ATA Convention and/or the Istanbul Convention.

The ATA Carnet system rests on two parallel legal frameworks: a series of individual customs conventions concluded between 1952 and 1972 under the Customs Co-operation Council (now the World Customs Organization), and the Istanbul Convention on Temporary Admission of 1990, which consolidates these earlier instruments into a single treaty structured around a mandatory body of provisions and a series of optional annexes. A country acceding to the Istanbul Convention must accept Annex A, which governs temporary admission papers including the ATA Carnet, together with at least one other annex. Some countries remain bound only by the original 1961 ATA Convention without having ratified the Istanbul Convention; others have acceded to the Istanbul Convention without ever having been party to the 1961 instrument. The table below sets out, for each contracting party, its status under both frameworks.

Field of application per country
Contracting party	ATA Convention (1961)	Istanbul Convention												
Contracting party	ATA Convention (1961)	Annex A (Note: The only reservation permitted under Annex A (Article 18(1)) concerns acceptance of ATA carnets for postal traffic. Reservations entered by: Bosnia and Herzegovina, Brazil, Bulgaria, China, Croatia, Cyprus, Czech Republic, Estonia, Finland, Germany, Greece, Hong Kong China, Hungary, Indonesia, Ireland, Italy, Lithuania, Malta, Moldova, Netherlands, North Macedonia, Philippines, Portugal, Romania, Slovenia, Spain, Sweden, Thailand, Turkey, United Kingdom, Vietnam, European Union.)	Annex B.1 (Note: The only reservation permitted under Annex B.1 concerns Article 5(1)(a) (clearance for home use of small representative samples intended for consumption or tasting). Reservations entered by: Bahrain, Chile, Indonesia, Kuwait, Malta, Oman, Qatar, Saudi Arabia, South Africa, United Arab Emirates, Zimbabwe.)	Annex B.2 (Note: No reservations are permitted under Annex B.2.)	Annex B.3 (Note: Reservations under Annex B.3 are permitted in respect of Article 5(1) (Customs document and security may be required for containers, pallets and packings) and Article 7 (up to three categories of goods may be excluded). Reservations entered by: Austria, Belgium, Bulgaria, Chile, China, Croatia, Cyprus, Czech Republic, Estonia, Finland, Germany, Greece, Hungary, Ireland, Italy, Lithuania, Malta, Netherlands, North Macedonia, Philippines, Poland, Portugal, Qatar, Romania, Slovenia, Spain, Sweden, Switzerland, Turkey, United Kingdom, Zimbabwe, European Union.)	Annex B.4 (Note: No reservations are permitted under Annex B.4.)	Annex B.5 (Note: The only reservation permitted under Annex B.5 (Article 6) concerns Article 4 insofar as it relates to scientific equipment and pedagogic material, allowing Contracting Parties to require the normal Customs document and security. Entered by: Austria, Belgium, Bosnia and Herzegovina, Bulgaria, Croatia, Cyprus, Czech Republic, Estonia, Finland, Germany, Greece, Hungary, Indonesia, Ireland, Italy, Lithuania, Malta, Netherlands, North Macedonia, Philippines, Poland, Portugal, Qatar, Romania, Slovenia, Spain, Sweden, Switzerland, Turkey, United Kingdom, Zimbabwe, European Union.)	Annex B.6 (Note: No reservations are permitted under Annex B.6.)	Annex B.7 (Note: No reservations are permitted under Annex B.7.)	Annex B.8 (Note: No reservation clause exists under Annex B.8 according to the 2006 Istanbul Convention Handbook commentary; however, the WCO's 2024 status synopsis records a reservation entered by Seychelles, the nature of which is not specified in the sources consulted.)	Annex B.9 (Note: No reservations are permitted under Annex B.9.)	Annex C (Note: Annex C concerns the temporary admission of means of transport and is administered through the CPD Carnet, not the ATA Carnet. Reservations permitted: Article 2(a) (exclude motor road vehicles and railway rolling stock); Article 6 (require a Customs document and/or security); Article 9.2 (different re-exportation period). Entered by: Austria, Belgium, Bulgaria, Croatia, Cyprus, Czech Republic, Estonia, Finland, Germany, Greece, Hungary, Indonesia, Ireland, Italy, Lithuania, Malta, Moldova, Netherlands, North Macedonia, Poland, Portugal, Romania, Slovenia, Spain, Sweden, Turkey, United Kingdom, European Union.)	Annex D (Note: Reservations permitted: Article 4(1) (require a Customs document and security for draught animals or animals for transhumance/grazing in a frontier zone); Appendix items 12–13 (refuse temporary admission for such animals or for work/transport). Entered by: Croatia, Estonia, Kazakhstan, Malta, Philippines, Seychelles.)	Annex E (Note: The only reservation permitted (Article 2) concerns partial relief from import taxes such as VAT or excise. Entered by: Austria, Belgium, Bulgaria, Croatia, Cyprus, Finland, Germany, Greece, Hungary, Malta, Netherlands, North Macedonia, Poland, Portugal, Romania, Seychelles, Slovenia, Spain, Sweden, Turkey, United Kingdom, European Union. Some parties, such as Bosnia and Herzegovina, do not accept Annex E at all.)
Albania	No	Yes	Yes	Yes	Yes	Yes	Yes	Yes	Yes	Yes	Yes	Yes	Yes	Yes
Algeria	Yes	Yes	Yes	Yes	Yes	Yes	Yes	Yes	Yes	Yes	Yes	Yes	Yes	Yes
Andorra	Yes	Yes	Yes	Yes	Yes	No	Yes	Yes	Yes	No	Yes	No	No	No
Armenia	No	Yes	Yes	Yes	Yes	No	Yes	No	No	No	No	No	No	No
Australia	Yes	Yes	Yes	No	No	No	No	No	No	No	No	No	No	No
Austria	Yes	Yes	Yes	Yes	Yes	Yes	Yes	Yes	Yes	Yes	Yes	Yes	Yes	Yes
Bahrain	No	Yes	Yes	No	No	No	No	No	No	No	No	No	No	No
Belarus	Yes	Yes	Yes	Yes	Yes	No	Yes	No	No	No	No	No	No	No
Belgium	Yes	Yes	Yes	Yes	Yes	Yes	Yes	Yes	Yes	Yes	Yes	Yes	Yes	Yes
Bosnia and Herzegovina	No	Yes	Yes	Yes	Yes	Yes	Yes	Yes	Yes	Yes	Yes	Yes	Yes	No
Brazil	No	Yes	Yes	Yes	No	No	Yes	Yes	No	No	No	No	No	No
Bulgaria	Yes	Yes	Yes	Yes	Yes	Yes	Yes	Yes	Yes	Yes	Yes	Yes	Yes	Yes
Canada	Yes	No	No	No	No	No	No	No	No	No	No	No	No	No
Chile	No	Yes	Yes	Yes	Yes	No	No	No	No	No	No	No	No	No
China	Yes	Yes (Note: Extended to the Macao Special Administrative Region with effect from 20 December 1999.)	Yes	Yes	Yes	No	No	No	No	No	No	No	No	No
Ivory Coast	Yes	No	No	No	No	No	No	No	No	No	No	No	No	No
Croatia	Yes	Yes	Yes	Yes	Yes	Yes	Yes	Yes	Yes	Yes	Yes	Yes	Yes	Yes
Cuba	Yes	No	No	No	No	No	No	No	No	No	No	No	No	No
Cyprus	Yes	Yes	Yes	Yes	Yes	Yes	Yes	Yes	Yes	Yes	Yes	Yes	Yes	Yes
Czech Republic	Yes	Yes	Yes	Yes	Yes	Yes	Yes	Yes	Yes	Yes	Yes	Yes	Yes	Yes
Denmark	Yes	Yes	Yes	Yes	Yes	Yes	Yes	Yes	Yes	Yes	Yes	Yes	Yes	Yes
Egypt	Yes	No	No	No	No	No	No	No	No	No	No	No	No	No
Estonia	No	Yes	Yes	Yes	Yes	No	Yes	Yes	No	No	Yes	Yes	Yes	No
Finland	Yes	Yes	Yes	Yes	Yes	Yes	Yes	Yes	Yes	Yes	Yes	Yes	Yes	Yes
France	Yes	Yes	Yes	Yes	Yes	Yes	Yes	Yes	Yes	Yes	Yes	Yes	Yes	Yes
Georgia	No	Yes	Yes	Yes	Yes	Yes	Yes	Yes	Yes	Yes	Yes	Yes	Yes	Yes
Germany	Yes	Yes	Yes	Yes	Yes	Yes	Yes	Yes	Yes	Yes	Yes	Yes	Yes	Yes
Greece	Yes	Yes	Yes	Yes	Yes	Yes	Yes	Yes	Yes	Yes	Yes	Yes	Yes	Yes
Hong Kong, China	No	Yes	Yes	Yes	No	No	No	Yes	Yes	No	No	Yes	No	No
Hungary	Yes	Yes	Yes	Yes	Yes	Yes	Yes	Yes	Yes	Yes	Yes	Yes	Yes	Yes
Iceland	Yes	No	No	No	No	No	No	No	No	No	No	No	No	No
India	Yes	No	No	No	No	No	No	No	No	No	No	No	No	No
Indonesia	No	Yes	Yes	Yes	No	No	Yes	Yes	No	No	Yes	Yes	No	No
Iran	Yes	Yes	Yes	Yes	Yes	Yes	Yes	Yes	Yes	Yes	Yes	Yes	Yes	Yes
Ireland	Yes	Yes	Yes	Yes	Yes	Yes	Yes	Yes	Yes	Yes	Yes	Yes	Yes	Yes
Israel	Yes	No	No	No	No	No	No	No	No	No	No	No	No	No
Italy	Yes	Yes	Yes	Yes	Yes	Yes	Yes	Yes	Yes	Yes	Yes	Yes	Yes	Yes
Japan	Yes	No	No	No	No	No	No	No	No	No	No	No	No	No
Jordan	No	Yes	Yes	No	No	No	No	No	No	No	No	No	No	No
Kazakhstan	No	Yes	Yes	Yes	Yes	No	Yes	Yes	Yes	No	No	No	Yes	No
Kosovo	No	Yes	Yes	Yes	Yes	Yes	Yes	Yes	Yes	Yes	Yes	Yes	Yes	Yes
Kuwait	No	Yes	Yes	No	No	No	No	No	No	No	No	No	No	No
South Korea	Yes	No	No	No	No	No	No	No	No	No	No	No	No	No
Latvia	No	Yes	Yes	Yes	Yes	Yes	Yes	Yes	Yes	Yes	Yes	Yes	Yes	Yes
Lebanon	Yes	No	No	No	No	No	No	No	No	No	No	No	No	No
Lesotho	Yes	No	No	No	No	No	No	No	No	No	No	No	No	No
Lithuania	No	Yes	Yes	Yes	Yes	Yes	Yes	Yes	Yes	Yes	Yes	Yes	Yes	Yes
Luxembourg	Yes	Yes	Yes	Yes	Yes	Yes	Yes	Yes	Yes	Yes	Yes	Yes	Yes	Yes
North Macedonia	Yes	Yes	Yes	Yes	Yes	Yes	Yes	Yes	Yes	Yes	Yes	Yes	Yes	Yes
Madagascar	No	Yes	Yes	Yes	Yes	Yes	Yes	Yes	Yes	Yes	Yes	Yes	Yes	Yes
Malaysia	Yes	No	No	No	No	No	No	No	No	No	No	No	No	No
Mali	No	Yes	No	No	No	No	No	No	No	No	No	No	No	No
Malta	Yes	Yes	Yes	Yes	Yes	Yes	Yes	Yes	Yes	Yes	Yes	Yes	Yes	Yes
Mauritius	Yes	Yes	Yes	Yes	No	No	Yes	No	No	No	No	No	No	No
Mexico	Yes	No	No	No	No	No	No	No	No	No	No	No	No	No
Moldova	Yes	Yes	Yes	Yes	Yes	No	Yes	Yes	Yes	No	Yes	Yes	Yes	Yes
Mongolia	No	Yes	Yes	Yes	No	No	Yes	No	No	No	No	No	No	No
Montenegro	No	Yes	Yes	Yes	Yes	Yes	Yes	Yes	Yes	Yes	Yes	Yes	Yes	Yes
Morocco	Yes	No	No	No	No	No	No	No	No	No	No	No	No	No
Netherlands	Yes	Yes	Yes	Yes	Yes	Yes	Yes	Yes	Yes	Yes	Yes	Yes	Yes	Yes
New Zealand	Yes	No	No	No	No	No	No	No	No	No	No	No	No	No
Niger	Yes	No	No	No	No	No	No	No	No	No	No	No	No	No
Nigeria	Yes	Yes	Yes	Yes	Yes	Yes	Yes	Yes	Yes	Yes	Yes	Yes	Yes	Yes
Norway	Yes	No	No	No	No	No	No	No	No	No	No	No	No	No
Oman	No	Yes	Yes	No	No	No	No	No	No	No	No	No	No	No
Pakistan	No	Yes	Yes	Yes	No	No	No	No	No	No	No	No	No	No
Peru	No	Yes	Yes	Yes	No	No	No	No	No	No	No	No	No	No
Philippines	No	Yes	Yes	Yes	Yes	Yes	Yes	Yes	No	No	Yes	No	Yes	No
Poland	Yes	Yes	Yes	Yes	Yes	Yes	Yes	Yes	Yes	Yes	Yes	Yes	Yes	Yes
Portugal	Yes	Yes	Yes	Yes	Yes	Yes	Yes	Yes	Yes	Yes	Yes	Yes	Yes	Yes
Qatar	No	Yes	Yes	Yes	Yes	No	Yes	No	No	No	Yes	No	No	No
Romania	Yes	Yes	Yes	Yes	Yes	Yes	Yes	Yes	Yes	Yes	Yes	Yes	Yes	Yes
Russia	Yes	Yes	Yes	Yes	Yes	No	Yes	No	No	No	No	No	Yes	No
Saudi Arabia	No	Yes	Yes	Yes	Yes	No	Yes	No	No	No	No	No	No	No
Senegal	Yes	No	No	No	No	No	No	No	No	No	No	No	No	No
Serbia	Yes	Yes	Yes	Yes	Yes	Yes	Yes	Yes	Yes	Yes	Yes	Yes	Yes	Yes
Seychelles	No	Yes	Yes	Yes	Yes	Yes	Yes	Yes	Yes	Yes	Yes	Yes	Yes	Yes
Singapore	Yes	No	No	No	No	No	No	No	No	No	No	No	No	No
Slovakia	Yes	Yes	Yes	Yes	Yes	Yes	Yes	Yes	Yes	Yes	Yes	Yes	Yes	Yes
Slovenia	Yes	Yes	Yes	Yes	Yes	Yes	Yes	Yes	Yes	Yes	Yes	Yes	Yes	Yes
South Africa	Yes	Yes	Yes	No	No	No	No	No	No	No	No	No	No	No
Spain	Yes	Yes	Yes	Yes	Yes	Yes	Yes	Yes	Yes	Yes	Yes	Yes	Yes	Yes
Sri Lanka	Yes	No	No	No	No	No	No	No	No	No	No	No	No	No
Sweden	Yes	Yes	Yes	Yes	Yes	Yes	Yes	Yes	Yes	Yes	Yes	Yes	Yes	Yes
Switzerland	Yes	Yes	Yes	Yes	Yes	No	Yes	Yes	Yes	Yes	Yes	Yes	Yes	No
Tajikistan	No	Yes	Yes	Yes	Yes	No	Yes	No	No	No	No	No	No	No
Thailand	Yes	Yes	Yes	No	No	No	No	No	No	No	No	No	No	No
Trinidad and Tobago	Yes	Yes	Yes	Yes	Yes	Yes	Yes	Yes	Yes	No	No	Yes	No	No
Tunisia	Yes	No	No	No	No	No	No	No	No	No	No	No	No	No
Turkey	Yes	Yes	Yes	Yes	Yes	Yes	Yes	Yes	Yes	Yes	Yes	Yes	Yes	Yes
Ukraine	Yes	Yes	Yes	Yes	Yes	Yes	Yes	Yes	Yes	Yes	Yes	Yes	Yes	Yes
United Arab Emirates	No	Yes	Yes	No	No	No	No	No	No	No	No	No	No	No
United Kingdom	Yes (Note: Extended to Gibraltar by the United Kingdom; Gibraltar is not an independent Contracting Party to the ATA Convention or the Istanbul Convention, but has its own National Guaranteeing Association (Gibraltar Chamber of Commerce) in the ICC guarantee chain. Gibraltar enacted domestic implementing legislation — the Imports and Exports (ATA Convention) Regulations 2020 (LN.2020/510), in force from 24 December 2020 — under the Imports and Exports Act 1986. As of that date, only the 1961 ATA Convention had been extended to Gibraltar; the Istanbul Convention annexes had not yet been extended.)	Yes	Yes	Yes	Yes	Yes	Yes	Yes	Yes	Yes	Yes	Yes	Yes	Yes
United States	Yes	No	No	No	No	No	No	No	No	No	No	No	No	No
Uzbekistan	No	Yes	Yes	Yes	Yes	No	Yes	Yes	No	No	No	No	No	No
Vietnam	No	Yes	Yes	No	No	No	No	No	No	No	No	No	No	No
Zimbabwe	No	Yes	Yes	Yes	Yes	No	Yes	Yes	No	No	Yes	No	No	No
European Union	No	Yes	Yes	Yes	Yes	Yes	Yes	Yes	Yes	Yes	Yes	Yes	Yes	Yes
Contracting party	ATA Convention (1961)	Annex A	Annex B.1	Annex B.2	Annex B.3	Annex B.4	Annex B.5	Annex B.6	Annex B.7	Annex B.8	Annex B.9	Annex C	Annex D	Annex E
Contracting party	ATA Convention (1961)	Istanbul Convention												
Morocco has signed but not ratified the Istanbul Convention; it participates in the ATA Carnet system under the original 1961 ATA Convention only. Some contracting parties accept additional categories of goods under national laws and regulations; see National laws below.
Sources: WCO General Secretariat SG0235Eb (10 July 2025); WCO PG0233E1 (ATA Convention, status as at 21 October 2013); WCO PG0343Ea, Position as regards signatures, ratifications and accessions (Istanbul Convention), as at 26 September 2024.

Several annexes permit contracting parties to enter limited reservations restricting their scope, as noted in the column headers above. Annexes B.2, B.4, B.6, B.7, B.8 and B.9 permit no reservations at all. Annex C, which concerns the temporary admission of motor vehicles and other means of transport, is not used for ATA Carnets; carnets covering this category of goods are issued separately as CPD Carnets.

=== Earlier conventions relevant to ATA carnets ===
The table below summarizes contracting-party status under the individual customs conventions that preceded the Istanbul Convention, several of which remain in force independently for countries that have not ratified the corresponding Istanbul annex. It complements, but does not replace, the field-of-application table above. Contracting-party status under these earlier conventions does not by itself indicate that ATA Carnets are currently issued or accepted in practice in a given territory; for current operational status, see the list of National Guaranteeing Associations above.

The wide table below gives an overview across all of the predecessor conventions at once; the narrower tables that follow pair each convention individually with its corresponding Istanbul annex and entry-into-force dates.

Contracting parties to older Customs conventions related to temporary admission / ATA carnets
Contracting party	ATA (1961)	Exhib./fairs (1961)	Prof. equip. (1961)	Pallets (1960)	Packings (1960)	Containers (1972)	Comm. samples (1952)	Seafarers (1964)	Scient. equip. (1968)	Pedag. mat. (1970)	Touring (1954)	Tourist publicity (1954 Protocol)	Private road veh. (1954)	Comm. road veh. (1956)	Aircraft & boats (1956)
Afghanistan	No	No	No	No	No	No	No	No	No	No	No	No	No	Yes	No
Albania	Yes	Yes	Yes	Yes	No	Yes	No	Yes	Yes	Yes	Yes	Yes	Yes	No	No
Algeria	Yes	Yes	Yes	No	Yes	Yes	No	Yes	Yes	Yes	Yes	Yes	Yes	Yes	Yes
Argentina	No	No	No	No	No	No	No	No	No	Yes	Yes	Yes	No	No	No
Armenia	No	No	No	No	No	Yes	No	No	No	No	No	No	No	No	No
Australia	Yes	Yes	Yes	Yes	No	Yes	Yes	Yes	Yes	Yes	Yes	Yes	Yes	No	No
Austria	Yes	Yes	Yes	Yes	Yes	Yes	Yes	No	Yes	Yes	Yes	Yes	Yes	Yes	Yes
Azerbaijan	No	No	No	No	No	Yes	No	No	No	No	No	No	No	Yes	No
Barbados	No	No	No	No	No	No	No	No	No	No	Yes	Yes	Yes	No	No
Belarus	Yes	No	No	No	No	Yes	No	No	No	No	No	No	No	No	No
Belgium	Yes	Yes	Yes	Yes	Yes	No	Yes	Yes	Yes	No	Yes	Yes	Yes	Yes	Yes
Benin	No	No	No	No	No	No	No	No	Yes	Yes	No	No	No	No	No
Bosnia and Herzegovina	No	No	No	Yes	No	No	Yes	No	No	No	Yes	No	Yes	Yes	No
Bulgaria	Yes	Yes	Yes	Yes	Yes	Yes	No	No	No	No	Yes	Yes	Yes	Yes	No
Burundi	No	No	No	No	No	Yes	No	No	No	No	No	No	No	No	No
Cambodia	No	Yes	No	No	No	No	No	No	No	No	Yes	No	No	Yes	No
Cameroon	No	No	No	No	No	No	No	No	Yes	Yes	No	No	No	No	No
Canada	Yes	No	No	No	No	Yes	Yes	No	Yes	No	Yes	No	Yes	No	No
Central African Republic	No	Yes	Yes	No	Yes	No	No	No	No	No	Yes	Yes	Yes	No	No
Chad	No	No	No	No	No	No	No	No	Yes	No	No	No	No	No	No
Chile	No	No	No	No	No	No	No	No	Yes	No	Yes	Yes	Yes	No	No
China	Yes	Yes	No	No	No	Yes	No	No	No	No	No	No	No	No	No
Costa Rica	No	No	No	No	No	No	No	No	No	No	Yes	Yes	Yes	No	No
Ivory Coast	Yes	Yes	No	No	No	No	No	Yes	No	No	No	No	No	No	No
Croatia	Yes	Yes	Yes	Yes	Yes	No	Yes	Yes	Yes	No	Yes	No	Yes	Yes	Yes
Cuba	Yes	Yes	Yes	Yes	Yes	Yes	Yes	No	No	No	Yes	Yes	Yes	Yes	No
Cyprus	Yes	Yes	Yes	No	No	No	Yes	No	Yes	Yes	Yes	Yes	Yes	Yes	No
Czech Republic	Yes	Yes	Yes	Yes	Yes	Yes	Yes	No	Yes	No	No	Yes	No	No	No
Democratic Republic of the Congo	No	No	No	No	No	No	Yes	No	No	No	No	No	No	No	No
Denmark	Yes	Yes	Yes	Yes	Yes	No	Yes	Yes	Yes	No	Yes	Yes	Yes	Yes	Yes
Dominican Republic	No	Yes	No	No	No	No	No	No	No	No	No	No	No	No	No
Ecuador	No	No	No	No	No	No	No	No	Yes	No	Yes	Yes	Yes	No	No
Egypt	Yes	Yes	Yes	No	Yes	No	Yes	Yes	Yes	No	Yes	Yes	Yes	Yes	No
El Salvador	No	No	No	No	No	No	No	No	No	No	Yes	Yes	Yes	No	No
European Union	No	No	No	No	No	No	No	No	No	No	No	No	Yes	Yes	No
Fiji	No	No	No	No	No	No	Yes	Yes	Yes	No	Yes	Yes	Yes	No	No
Finland	Yes	Yes	Yes	Yes	Yes	Yes	Yes	Yes	Yes	No	Yes	Yes	Yes	Yes	Yes
France	Yes	Yes	Yes	Yes	Yes	No	Yes	Yes	Yes	Yes	Yes	Yes	Yes	Yes	Yes
Gabon	No	No	No	No	No	No	No	No	Yes	No	No	No	No	No	No
Georgia	No	No	No	No	No	Yes	No	No	No	No	No	No	No	No	No
Germany	Yes	Yes	Yes	Yes	Yes	No	Yes	Yes	Yes	Yes	Yes	Yes	Yes	Yes	Yes
Ghana	No	No	No	No	No	No	Yes	No	Yes	No	Yes	Yes	Yes	No	No
Greece	Yes	Yes	Yes	No	No	No	Yes	Yes	Yes	Yes	Yes	Yes	No	Yes	No
Guinea	No	No	No	No	No	No	Yes	No	No	No	No	No	No	No	No
Haiti	No	No	No	No	No	No	Yes	No	No	No	Yes	Yes	Yes	No	No
Hungary	Yes	Yes	Yes	Yes	No	Yes	Yes	No	Yes	Yes	Yes	Yes	Yes	Yes	Yes
Iceland	Yes	Yes	Yes	No	No	No	Yes	No	No	No	No	No	No	No	No
India	Yes	Yes	No	No	No	No	Yes	No	Yes	Yes	Yes	Yes	Yes	Yes	No
Indonesia	No	No	No	No	No	Yes	Yes	No	No	No	No	No	No	No	No
Iran	Yes	Yes	Yes	No	Yes	No	Yes	Yes	Yes	Yes	Yes	Yes	Yes	No	No
Iraq	No	No	No	No	No	No	No	No	No	Yes	No	No	No	No	No
Ireland	Yes	Yes	Yes	No	Yes	No	Yes	Yes	Yes	No	Yes	Yes	Yes	Yes	No
Israel	Yes	Yes	Yes	No	Yes	No	Yes	Yes	Yes	Yes	Yes	Yes	Yes	No	No
Italy	Yes	Yes	Yes	Yes	Yes	No	Yes	Yes	Yes	No	Yes	Yes	Yes	Yes	Yes
Jamaica	No	No	No	No	No	No	Yes	No	No	No	Yes	Yes	Yes	No	Yes
Japan	Yes	Yes	Yes	No	No	No	Yes	Yes	No	No	Yes	Yes	Yes	No	No
Jordan	No	No	No	No	No	No	No	No	No	Yes	Yes	Yes	Yes	No	No
Kazakhstan	No	No	No	No	No	Yes	No	No	No	No	No	No	No	No	No
Kenya	No	No	Yes	No	No	No	Yes	Yes	Yes	No	No	No	No	No	No
South Korea	Yes	Yes	Yes	No	Yes	Yes	Yes	Yes	Yes	No	No	No	No	No	No
Kyrgyzstan	No	No	No	No	No	Yes	No	No	No	No	No	No	No	Yes	No
Lebanon	Yes	Yes	Yes	No	Yes	Yes	No	Yes	Yes	Yes	Yes	Yes	No	No	No
Lesotho	Yes	Yes	Yes	No	Yes	No	No	No	Yes	Yes	No	No	No	No	No
Liberia	No	No	No	No	No	Yes	Yes	No	No	No	Yes	Yes	Yes	No	No
Libya	No	No	No	No	No	No	No	No	Yes	No	No	No	No	No	No
Lithuania	No	No	No	No	No	Yes	No	No	No	No	Yes	Yes	Yes	Yes	No
Luxembourg	Yes	Yes	Yes	Yes	Yes	No	Yes	Yes	Yes	No	Yes	Yes	Yes	Yes	Yes
Macau, China	No	No	No	No	No	No	No	Yes	Yes	No	No	No	No	No	No
Madagascar	No	Yes	Yes	No	No	No	No	Yes	No	No	No	No	No	No	No
Malaysia	Yes	No	No	No	No	No	Yes	No	No	No	Yes	Yes	Yes	No	No
Mali	No	Yes	No	No	No	No	No	No	Yes	Yes	Yes	Yes	Yes	No	No
Malta	Yes	Yes	Yes	No	No	No	Yes	Yes	No	No	Yes	Yes	Yes	No	Yes
Mauritius	Yes	No	No	No	No	No	Yes	No	No	No	Yes	Yes	Yes	No	Yes
Mexico	Yes	Yes	Yes	No	No	No	Yes	No	Yes	No	Yes	Yes	Yes	No	No
Moldova	No	No	No	No	No	No	No	No	No	No	No	No	No	Yes	No
Montenegro	No	No	No	Yes	No	No	Yes	No	No	No	Yes	Yes	Yes	Yes	Yes
Morocco	Yes	Yes	No	No	No	Yes	No	No	Yes	Yes	Yes	Yes	Yes	No	No
Nepal	No	No	No	No	No	No	No	No	No	No	Yes	No	Yes	No	No
Netherlands	Yes	Yes	Yes	Yes	Yes	No	Yes	Yes	Yes	Yes	Yes	Yes	Yes	Yes	Yes
New Zealand	Yes	Yes	Yes	No	No	Yes	Yes	Yes	Yes	Yes	Yes	Yes	Yes	No	No
Niger	Yes	Yes	Yes	No	No	No	No	Yes	Yes	Yes	No	No	No	No	No
Nigeria	Yes	No	No	No	No	No	Yes	Yes	Yes	No	Yes	Yes	Yes	No	No
North Macedonia	Yes	Yes	Yes	No	No	No	No	No	No	No	No	No	Yes	Yes	No
Norway	Yes	Yes	Yes	Yes	Yes	No	Yes	Yes	No	No	Yes	Yes	Yes	Yes	No
Pakistan	No	No	No	No	No	No	Yes	Yes	No	No	No	No	No	No	No
Peru	No	No	No	No	No	No	No	No	No	No	Yes	Yes	Yes	No	No
Philippines	No	No	No	No	No	No	No	No	Yes	Yes	Yes	Yes	Yes	No	No
Poland	Yes	Yes	Yes	Yes	Yes	Yes	Yes	No	Yes	Yes	Yes	Yes	Yes	Yes	No
Portugal	Yes	Yes	Yes	Yes	Yes	No	Yes	Yes	Yes	No	Yes	Yes	Yes	Yes	Yes
Romania	Yes	Yes	Yes	Yes	Yes	Yes	Yes	Yes	Yes	No	Yes	Yes	Yes	Yes	No
Russia	Yes	No	No	No	No	Yes	No	No	No	No	Yes	Yes	Yes	No	No
Rwanda	No	No	No	No	No	No	Yes	No	No	Yes	Yes	Yes	Yes	No	No
Saudi Arabia	No	No	No	No	No	Yes	No	No	No	No	No	No	Yes	Yes	No
Senegal	No	Yes	Yes	No	No	No	No	No	Yes	Yes	Yes	Yes	Yes	No	No
Serbia	Yes	Yes	Yes	Yes	Yes	Yes	Yes	Yes	No	No	Yes	Yes	Yes	Yes	Yes
Sierra Leone	No	No	No	No	No	No	Yes	Yes	No	No	Yes	Yes	Yes	Yes	Yes
Singapore	Yes	No	No	No	No	No	Yes	No	Yes	No	No	Yes	Yes	Yes	No
Slovakia	Yes	Yes	Yes	Yes	Yes	Yes	Yes	No	Yes	No	No	Yes	No	No	No
Slovenia	Yes	Yes	Yes	Yes	Yes	No	Yes	Yes	No	No	Yes	No	Yes	Yes	Yes
Solomon Islands	No	No	No	No	No	No	No	No	Yes	No	Yes	Yes	Yes	No	Yes
South Africa	Yes	Yes	Yes	No	Yes	No	No	Yes	Yes	Yes	No	No	No	No	No
Spain	Yes	Yes	Yes	Yes	Yes	Yes	Yes	Yes	Yes	Yes	Yes	Yes	Yes	Yes	Yes
Sri Lanka	Yes	Yes	Yes	No	No	No	Yes	No	Yes	Yes	Yes	No	Yes	No	No
Sudan	No	Yes	No	No	No	No	No	No	No	No	No	No	Yes	No	No
Sweden	Yes	Yes	Yes	Yes	Yes	No	Yes	Yes	No	No	Yes	Yes	Yes	Yes	Yes
Switzerland	Yes	Yes	Yes	Yes	Yes	Yes	Yes	Yes	Yes	Yes	Yes	Yes	Yes	Yes	Yes
Syria	No	No	No	No	No	No	No	Yes	Yes	No	Yes	Yes	No	No	No
Tanzania	No	No	No	No	No	No	Yes	Yes	No	No	Yes	Yes	Yes	No	No
Thailand	Yes	Yes	Yes	No	No	No	Yes	No	Yes	No	No	No	No	No	No
Togo	No	No	No	No	No	No	No	No	No	Yes	No	No	No	No	No
Tonga	No	No	No	No	No	No	Yes	No	No	No	Yes	No	Yes	No	No
Trinidad and Tobago	Yes	Yes	Yes	No	No	Yes	Yes	No	No	No	Yes	Yes	Yes	No	Yes
Tunisia	Yes	Yes	Yes	No	Yes	Yes	No	Yes	No	Yes	Yes	Yes	Yes	No	No
Turkey	Yes	Yes	Yes	Yes	Yes	Yes	Yes	Yes	Yes	Yes	Yes	Yes	Yes	Yes	No
Uganda	No	Yes	Yes	No	Yes	No	Yes	Yes	Yes	Yes	Yes	Yes	Yes	No	No
Ukraine	No	No	No	No	No	Yes	No	No	No	No	No	No	No	No	No
United Arab Emirates	No	No	No	No	No	No	No	No	No	No	No	No	Yes	No	No
United Kingdom	Yes	Yes	Yes	Yes	Yes	No	Yes	Yes	Yes	No	Yes	Yes	Yes	Yes	Yes
United States	Yes	No	Yes	No	No	Yes	Yes	No	No	No	Yes	No	Yes	No	No
Uruguay	No	No	No	No	No	No	No	No	No	No	Yes	No	No	No	No
Uzbekistan	No	No	No	No	No	Yes	No	No	No	No	No	No	No	Yes	No
Vietnam	No	No	No	No	No	No	No	No	No	No	Yes	No	Yes	No	No
Zimbabwe	Yes	Yes	Yes	No	Yes	No	No	No	Yes	Yes	No	No	No	No	No
Sources: WCO General Secretariat SG0235Eb (10 July 2025); individual WCO convention status papers PG0233E1 (ATA), PG0133E1 (Exhibitions/Fairs), PG0129E1 (Professional Equipment), PG0131E1 (Packings), PG0127E1 (Seafarers), PG0128E1 (Scientific Equipment), PG0130E1 (Pedagogic Material), PG0313Ea (Containers); and UN Treaty Collection, Multilateral Treaties Deposited with the Secretary-General, Chapter XI: XI.A.5 (Commercial Samples), XI.A.6 (Touring), XI.A.7 (Tourist Publicity Protocol), XI.A.8 (Private Road Vehicles), XI.A.10 (Commercial Road Vehicles), XI.A.11 (Aircraft and Pleasure Boats), XI.A.14 (Pallets).

Annex A is the only annex every Contracting Party must accept, since it governs the ATA carnet document itself; this table pairs it with its sole predecessor, the 1961 ATA Convention.

Contracting parties — ATA Convention (1961) and Istanbul Convention (Annex A, mandatory)
Contracting party	ATA Convention (1961)	Istanbul Convention / Annex A
Albania	No	2009-05-28
Algeria	1973-07-02	1998-05-08
Andorra	1998-09-02	1998-09-02
Armenia	No	2018-07-03
Australia	1967-06-14	1992-01-09
Austria	1963-05-20	1994-09-29
Bahrain	No	2012-05-31
Belarus	1998-05-07	1998-05-07
Belgium	1966-02-22	1997-07-18
Bosnia and Herzegovina	No	2010-04-07
Brazil	No	2011-05-04
Bulgaria	1964-07-31	2003-03-11
Canada	1972-07-10	No
Chile	No	2004-03-03
China	1993-08-27 (Note: Extended to Hong Kong, China with effect from 1 July 1997.)	1993-08-27
Ivory Coast	1962-06-14	No
Croatia	1994-09-29	1999-03-01
Cuba	1963-09-24	No
Cyprus	1976-10-25	2004-10-25
Czech Republic	1993-01-01	1999-11-24
Denmark	1965-04-14 (Note: Extended to the Faroe Islands.)	1997-06-18
Egypt	1968-01-11	No
Estonia	No	1996-01-17
European Union	No	1997-06-18
Finland	1964-08-01	1997-06-18
France	1962-12-20	1997-06-18
Georgia	No	2010-04-01
Germany	1965-10-15	1997-06-18
Greece	1975-10-23	1997-06-18
Hong Kong, China	— (Note: Covered under China's accession to the ATA Convention, extended to Hong Kong with effect from 1 July 1997.)	1995-02-15
Hungary	1965-11-22	2005-01-31
Iceland	1970-06-16	No
India	1989-07-05	No
Indonesia	No	2014-11-17
Iran	1968-04-16	2016-09-20
Ireland	1965-04-15	1997-06-18
Israel	1966-08-25	No
Italy	1964-06-19	1997-06-18
Japan	1973-08-01	No
Jordan	No	1992-06-24
Kazakhstan	No	2013-08-21
Kosovo	No	2024-09-18
South Korea	1978-04-04	No
Kuwait	No	2017-03-12
Latvia	No	1999-07-16
Lebanon	1979-12-11	No
Lesotho	1983-05-10	No
Lithuania	No	1998-02-26
Luxembourg	1966-06-10	1997-06-18
Madagascar	No	2008-06-02
Malaysia	1988-06-13	No
Mali	No	2004-10-08
Malta	1983-11-22	2001-01-08
Mauritius	1982-04-22	1995-06-07
Mexico	2000-11-13	No
Moldova	No	2009-02-02
Mongolia	No	2003-06-05
Montenegro	No	2008-06-23
Morocco	1996-11-19	No
Netherlands	1964-01-17	1997-06-18
New Zealand	1977-11-28	No
Niger	1978-12-08	No
Nigeria	1973-10-01	1993-06-10
North Macedonia	1996-04-03	2006-04-21
Norway	1964-10-29	No
Oman	No	2012-01-11
Pakistan	No	2004-05-18
Peru	No	2021-07-27
Philippines	No	2022-01-17
Poland	1969-07-19	1995-09-12
Portugal	1966-04-20	1997-06-18
Qatar	No	2014-09-10
Romania	1967-03-07	2002-11-26
Russia	1996-04-18	1996-04-18
Saudi Arabia	No	2011-05-04
Senegal	1977-10-14	No
Serbia	2001-12-27	2010-07-07
Seychelles	No	2023-11-10
Singapore	1983-11-14	No
Slovakia	1993-02-05	2000-09-22
Slovenia	1993-02-23	2000-10-23
South Africa	1975-12-18	2004-05-18
Spain	1964-04-06	1997-06-18
Sri Lanka	1981-07-14	No
Sweden	1964-03-19	1997-06-18
Switzerland	1963-04-30	1995-05-11
Tajikistan	No	1997-08-27
Thailand	1994-09-30	2007-01-05
Trinidad and Tobago	1981-01-05	2011-08-29
Tunisia	1971-03-10	No
Turkey	1974-08-23	2004-12-15
Ukraine	No	2004-06-22
United Arab Emirates	No	2010-09-14
United Kingdom	1963-07-19	1997-06-18
United States	1968-12-03	No
Uzbekistan	No	2020-06-10
Vietnam	No	2019-04-03
Zimbabwe	No	1992-11-17
Sources: WCO PG0233E1 (ATA Convention, status as at 21 October 2013); WCO Istanbul Convention (Convention on Temporary Admission) status of ratifications/accessions as at September 2024.

Annex B.1 covers goods for display or use at exhibitions, fairs and similar events, replacing the 1961 Exhibitions and Fairs Convention in full.

Contracting parties — Exhibitions/Fairs Convention (1961) and Istanbul Convention Annex B.1
Contracting party	Exhibitions & Fairs Convention (1961)	Istanbul Convention Annex B.1
Algeria	1988-10-31	1998-08-08
Andorra	No	1998-12-02
Australia	1962-12-20	1993-11-27
Austria	1962-09-20	1994-12-29
Belarus	No	1998-08-07
Belgium	1967-07-06	1997-09-18
Bulgaria	1964-07-31	2003-06-11
Chile	No	2004-06-03
China	1993-08-27	1993-11-27
Croatia	1994-09-29	1999-06-01
Cyprus	1972-12-15	2005-01-25
Czech Republic	1993-01-01	2000-02-24
Denmark	1965-04-14	1997-09-18
Estonia	No	1996-04-17
Finland	1964-08-01	1997-09-18
France	1964-06-22	1997-09-18
Germany	1967-06-09	1997-09-18
Greece	1962-07-19	1997-09-18
Hong Kong, China	No (Note: Covered via China's accession to the 1961 Exhibitions/Fairs Convention, extended to Hong Kong with effect from 1 July 1997.)	1995-05-15
Hungary	1963-02-04	2004-07-18
Ireland	1965-04-15	1997-09-18
Italy	1963-11-09	1997-09-18
Jordan	No	1993-11-27
Latvia	No	1999-10-16
Lithuania	No	1998-05-26
Luxembourg	1971-02-16	1997-09-18
Mali	1989-03-03	2005-01-27
Malta	1988-05-11	2001-04-08
North Macedonia	1996-04-03	2006-07-21
Mauritius	No	1995-09-07
Mongolia	No	2003-09-05
Netherlands	1964-01-17	1997-09-18
Nigeria	No	1993-11-27
Pakistan	No	2004-08-18
Poland	1969-07-19	1995-12-12
Portugal	1962-03-31	1997-09-18
Romania	1964-01-15	2003-02-26
Russia	No	1996-07-18
Slovakia	1993-02-05	2000-12-22
Slovenia	1993-02-23	2001-01-23
South Africa	1971-09-28	2004-08-18
Spain	1963-02-11	1997-09-18
Sweden	1964-03-19	1997-09-18
Switzerland	1963-04-30	1995-08-11
Tajikistan	No	1997-11-27
Turkey	1974-08-23	2005-03-15
Ukraine	No	2004-09-22
United Kingdom	1963-03-25	1997-09-18
Zimbabwe	No	1993-11-27
European Union	No	1997-09-18
Sources: UN Treaty Collection registration no. 6863 (1961 Convention, status as at registration); WCO Istanbul Convention Handbook, Annex B.1 entry-into-force table (50 Contracting Parties).

Annex B.2 covers professional equipment, replacing the 1961 Professional Equipment Convention in full.

Contracting parties — Professional Equipment Convention (1961) and Istanbul Convention Annex B.2
Contracting party	Professional Equipment Convention (1961)	Istanbul Convention Annex B.2
Algeria	1972-12-05	1998-08-08
Andorra	No	1998-12-02
Australia	1968-03-04	1994-12-29
Austria	1963-01-06	1994-12-29
Belarus	No	1998-08-07
Belgium	1965-09-07	1997-09-18
Bulgaria	1964-11-01	2003-06-11
Central African Republic	1962-07-02	No
Chile	No	2004-06-03
China	No	1994-12-29
Croatia	1994-09-29	1999-06-01
Cuba	1963-03-04	No
Cyprus	1973-03-15	2005-01-25
Czech Republic	1993-01-01 (Note: Czechoslovakia signed the Convention definitively on 28 March 1962 (effect 1 July 1962). The Czech Republic and Slovakia are treated as successor states.)	2000-02-24
Denmark	1965-07-15	1997-09-18
Egypt	1963-06-26	No
Estonia	No	1996-04-17
European Union	No	1997-09-18
Finland	1964-11-02	1997-09-18
France	1962-07-01	1997-09-18
Germany	1969-10-11	1997-09-18
Greece	1962-10-20	1997-09-18
Hong Kong, China	— (Note: Covered via the United Kingdom's extension of the Professional Equipment Convention to Hong Kong with effect from 14 March 1974, and to the Hong Kong SAR from 1 July 1997.)	1995-05-15
Hungary	1963-05-05	2004-07-28
Iceland	1971-03-08	No
Indonesia	No	No
Iran	1968-07-16	No
Ireland	1965-07-16	1997-09-18
Israel	1966-05-01	No
Italy	1963-12-21	1997-09-18
Japan	1973-11-01	No
Jordan	No	1994-12-29
Kenya	1983-08-31 (Note: Kenya accepted Annex C only of the Professional Equipment Convention.)	No
South Korea	1978-07-04	No
Latvia	No	1999-10-16
Lebanon	1980-03-11	No
Lesotho	1982-04-27	No
Lithuania	No	1998-05-26
Luxembourg	1966-04-28	1997-09-18
Madagascar	1962-07-13	No
Malta	1988-08-11	2001-04-08
Mauritius	No	1995-09-07
Mexico	2000-11-07 (Note: Mexico accepted Annexes A and B only of the Professional Equipment Convention.)	No
Mongolia	No	2003-09-05
Montenegro	2002-02-04 (Note: Listed as "Serbia and Montenegro" in WCO PG0129E1a (status as at 1 July 2006); both successor states are treated individually for current Istanbul Convention status.)	No
Netherlands	1964-02-21	1997-09-18
Niger	1962-07-01	No
Nigeria	No	1994-12-29
North Macedonia	1996-04-03	No
Norway	1962-07-01	No
Pakistan	No	2004-08-18
Poland	1969-10-19	1995-12-12
Portugal	1962-07-01	1997-09-18
Romania	1968-06-26	2003-02-26
Russia	No	1996-07-18
Saudi Arabia	No	2024-06-25 (Note: Post-dates the WCO Istanbul Convention Handbook's 48-party Annex B.2 table (2006/2008 edition); sourced from a secondary compilation.)
Serbia	2002-02-04	No
Slovakia	1993-02-05	2000-12-22
Slovenia	1993-02-23	2001-01-23
South Africa	1971-12-28	2004-08-18
Spain	1963-05-12 (Note: Spain denounced the Convention with effect from 6 January 1973 but cancelled the denunciation with effect from 24 May 1976, resuming participation from that date.)	1997-09-18
Sri Lanka	1991-05-23	No
Sweden	1964-06-20	1997-09-18
Switzerland	1963-07-31 (Note: Extended to the Principality of Liechtenstein for as long as it is linked to Switzerland by a customs union treaty.)	1995-08-11
Tajikistan	No	1997-11-27
Thailand	1994-12-30	2007-04-05
Trinidad and Tobago	1981-04-05	No
Tunisia	1972-07-21	No
Turkey	1974-11-23	2005-03-15
Uganda	1989-10-11	No
Ukraine	No	2004-09-22
United Kingdom	1963-06-26 (Note: Extended on the same date to Jersey, the Isle of Man and the Bailiwick of Guernsey; extended to Hong Kong with effect from 14 March 1974, and to the Hong Kong SAR from 1 July 1997.)	1997-09-18
United States	1968-12-03 (Note: Applies to the customs territory of the United States, including the 50 states, the District of Columbia, and Puerto Rico.)	No
Zimbabwe	1987-05-18	1993-11-27
Sources: UN Treaty Collection registration no. 6862 (Professional Equipment Convention, "Date of Effect" column, status as registered); WCO PG0129E1a (status as at 1 July 2006, for entries not in UN registration 6862 or post-dating it); WCO Istanbul Convention Handbook, Annex B.2 entry-into-force table (48 Contracting Parties).

Annex B.3 covers containers, pallets, packings, samples and other goods imported in connection with a commercial operation, and is the most composite of the annexes, drawing on four earlier instruments: the 1960 Pallets Convention and 1960 Packings Convention, replaced in full, together with only specified provisions of the 1972 Containers Convention and the 1952 Commercial Samples Convention (Articles 3, 5 and 6(1.b and 2) of the latter).

Contracting parties — Pallets (1960), Packings (1960), Containers (1972), Commercial Samples (1952) conventions, and Istanbul Convention Annex B.3
Contracting party	Pallets (1960)	Packings (1960)	Containers (1972)	Commercial Samples (1952)	Istanbul Convention Annex B.3
Albania	2008-10-14	No	No	No	No
Algeria	No	1988-11-03	1978-12-14	No	1998-08-08
Andorra	No	No	No	No	1998-12-02
Armenia	No	No	2006-06-09	No	No
Australia	1969-10-01	No	1975-11-10	1956-01-06	No
Austria	1963-10-07	1962-03-09	1977-06-17	1956-06-08	1996-04-17
Belarus	No	No	1976-09-01	No	1998-08-07
Belgium	1962-03-14	1963-06-27	No	1957-08-28	1997-09-18
Bosnia and Herzegovina	1994-01-12	No	No	1994-01-12	No
Bulgaria	1961-02-28	1969-08-05	1977-02-22	No	2003-06-11
Canada	No	No	1975-12-10	1974-06-12	No
China	No	No	1986-01-22	No	2019-01-09
Croatia	1994-08-31	1994-09-29	No	1994-08-31	1999-06-01
Cuba	1963-09-26	1963-10-31	1984-11-23	1976-04-26	No
Cyprus	No	No	No	1963-05-16	2005-01-25
Czech Republic	1993-06-02	1993-01-01	1974-09-04	1993-06-02	2000-02-24
Denmark	1961-03-14	1961-12-15	No	1955-10-05	1997-09-18
Egypt	No	1963-03-25	No	1955-09-29	No
Estonia	No	No	No	No	1996-04-17
Finland	1966-08-19	1965-04-23	1983-02-22	1954-05-27	1997-09-18
France	1962-03-12	1961-01-26	No	1964-02-07	1997-09-18
Georgia	No	No	1999-06-02	No	No
Germany	1964-09-29	1969-07-11	No	1955-09-02	1997-09-18
Greece	No	No	No	1955-02-10	1997-09-18
Hong Kong, China	No	No	No	No	1996-04-17
Hungary	1963-07-26	No	1973-12-12	1957-06-03	2004-07-18
Iceland	No	No	No	1977-04-28	No
India	No	No	No	1954-08-03	No
Indonesia	No	No	1989-10-11	1954-04-21	No
Iran	No	1968-04-16	No	1970-06-11	No
Ireland	No	1965-09-15	No	1959-04-23	1997-09-18
Israel	No	1961-06-02	No	1957-10-08	No
Italy	1967-01-05	1963-05-30	No	1958-02-20	1997-09-18
Japan	No	No	No	1955-08-02	No
Kazakhstan	No	No	2005-01-25	No	2013-11-21
South Korea	No	1975-10-21	1984-10-19	1978-06-12	No
Latvia	No	No	No	No	1999-10-16
Lebanon	No	No	2013-08-29	No	No
Lesotho	No	1982-01-27	No	No	No
Lithuania	No	No	2002-03-27	No	1998-05-26
Luxembourg	1962-07-31	1964-05-12	No	1957-09-09	1997-09-18
North Macedonia	No	No	No	No	2006-07-21
Malaysia	No	No	No	1958-08-21	No
Malta	No	No	No	1968-06-27	2001-04-08
Mauritius	No	No	No	1969-07-18	No
Mexico	No	No	No	2000-11-07	No
Moldova	No	No	2016-10-11	No	2010-07-01
Mongolia	No	No	No	No	2003-09-05
Montenegro	2006-10-23	No	2006-10-23	2006-10-23	2008-09-23
Morocco	No	No	1990-08-14	No	No
Netherlands	1962-10-22	1962-11-21	No	1955-05-03	1997-09-18
New Zealand	No	No	1974-12-20	1957-04-19	No
Nigeria	No	No	No	1961-06-26	1996-04-17
Norway	1964-10-27	1961-11-21	No	1954-11-02	No
Pakistan	No	No	No	1953-10-12	No
Philippines	No	No	No	No	2022-04-17
Poland	1969-09-04	1965-06-29	1982-04-29	1960-02-18	2001-06-15
Portugal	1968-01-15	1990-05-23	No	1956-09-24	1997-09-18
Romania	1964-05-15	1966-12-23	1975-03-06	1968-11-15	2003-02-26
Russia	No	No	1976-08-23	No	1996-07-18
Saudi Arabia	No	No	2008-12-23	No	2024-06-25
Serbia	2001-03-12	No	2001-09-06	2001-03-12	No
Singapore	No	No	No	1966-06-07	No
Slovakia	1993-05-28	1993-02-05	1974-09-04	1993-05-28	2000-12-22
Slovenia	1992-11-03	1993-02-23	No	1992-11-03	2001-01-23
South Africa	No	1973-10-11	No	No	No
Spain	1973-02-02	1965-01-08	1975-04-16	1954-09-09	1997-09-18
Sri Lanka	No	No	No	1959-10-28	No
Sweden	1961-03-01	1961-03-21	No	1955-02-23	1997-09-18
Switzerland	1963-04-24	1963-04-30	1976-10-12	1954-12-04	1996-04-17
Tajikistan	No	No	No	No	1997-11-27
Thailand	No	No	No	1994-11-30	No
Trinidad and Tobago	No	No	1990-03-23	1966-04-11	No
Tunisia	No	No	2009-03-11	No	No
Turkey	1974-10-10	1965-12-27	1994-07-13	1956-12-08	2005-03-15
Ukraine	No	No	1976-09-01	No	2004-09-22
United Kingdom	1962-10-01	1977-04-01	No	1955-10-21	1997-09-18
United States	No	No	1984-11-12	1957-09-17	No
Uzbekistan	No	No	1996-11-27	No	No
Zimbabwe	No	1987-02-18	No	No	No
European Union	No	No	No	No	1997-09-18
Sources: UN Treaty Collection Chapter XI.A.14 (Pallets Convention, status as at 20 June 2026); WCO PG0131E1a (Packings Convention, status as at 1 July 2006); WCO Handbook, Customs Convention on Containers, 1972 (January 2023 edition), Part II, List of Contracting Parties (status as at 14 June 2021); UN Treaty Collection Chapter XI.A.5 (Commercial Samples Convention, status as at 20 June 2026); WCO PG0343Ea (Istanbul Convention Annex B.3, status as at 26 September 2024). Annex B.3 replaces the Pallets and Packings conventions in full, and only specified articles of the Containers Convention and the Commercial Samples Convention.

Annex B.5 covers goods imported for educational, scientific or cultural purposes, consolidating three separate conventions on seafarers' welfare material, scientific equipment and pedagogic material into a single annex.

Contracting parties — Seafarers (1964), Scientific Equipment (1968), Pedagogic Material (1970) conventions, and Istanbul Convention Annex B.5
Contracting party	Seafarers (1964)	Scientific equipment (1968)	Pedagogic material (1970)	Istanbul Convention Annex B.5
Algeria	1969-06-05	1969-11-05	1971-09-16	1998-08-08
Andorra	No	No	No	1998-12-02
Argentina	No	No	1973-04-03	No
Australia	1967-04-09	1969-09-30	1971-09-25	No
Austria	No	1972-06-29	1973-01-10	1995-09-07
Barbados	No	No	1975-06-07	No
Belarus	No	No	No	1998-08-07
Belgium	1966-09-20	1971-02-12	No	1997-09-18
Benin	No	1969-09-05	1971-09-10	No
Bulgaria	No	No	No	2003-06-11
Cameroon	No	1970-03-05	1971-09-29	No
Canada	No	1974-10-24	No	No
Chad	No	1969-09-30	No	No
Chile	No	1970-07-03	No	No
Croatia	1994-09-29 (Note: Not in the UN treaty registration (post-dates the original 1963/1965 registration); sourced from WCO status paper.)	1994-09-29	No	1999-06-01
Cyprus	No	1971-05-12	1974-02-28	2005-01-25
Czech Republic	No	1993-01-01 (Note: Czechoslovakia was an original signatory; the Czech Republic and Slovakia are treated as successor states.)	No	2000-02-24
Denmark	1966-08-16	1969-09-05	No	1997-09-18
Ecuador	No	1969-12-23	No	No
Egypt	1968-01-20	1970-08-26	— (Note: Egypt withdrew a reservation on 25 January 1980; no accession date is recorded in the UN registration or WCO status paper for the Pedagogic Material Convention.)	No
Estonia	No	No	No	1996-04-17
European Union	No	No	No	1997-09-18
Fiji	No (Note: Fiji was covered under the United Kingdom's extension of the Seafarers Convention from 26 November 1966; it did not accede separately.)	1971-06-17	No	No
Finland	1968-08-17	No	No	1997-09-18
France	1966-10-06	1969-09-05	1973-06-15	1997-09-18
Gabon	No	1969-11-25	No	No
Germany	1969-10-11	1969-09-10	1971-09-10	1997-09-18
Ghana	No	1969-09-05	No	No
Greece	1971-04-18	1974-04-23	1974-04-23	1997-09-18
Hungary	No	1976-05-25	1976-05-25	2004-07-18
India	No	1971-06-09	1974-03-04	No
Iran	1970-04-21	1970-04-21	1972-07-24	No
Iraq	No	No	1972-03-02	No
Ireland	1967-05-27	No	No	1997-09-18
Israel	1971-12-13	1971-02-05	1973-07-05	No
Italy	1968-06-26	1975-08-06	No	1997-09-18
Ivory Coast	1978-12-26	No	No	No
Japan	1968-09-15 (Note: Deposit date 15 June 1968; entry into force three months later per Convention Article. UN registration does not show a "Date of Effect" for Japan.)	No	No	No
Jordan	No	No	1971-09-25	No
Kenya	1967-06-06	1983-12-01	No	No
South Korea	1976-01-21	1982-09-18	1982-09-18	No
Latvia	No	No	No	1999-10-16
Lebanon	1965-12-11	1971-08-07	1971-09-10	No
Lesotho	No	1982-04-27	1982-04-27	No
Libya	No	1969-09-18	No	No
Lithuania	No	No	No	1998-05-26
Luxembourg	1975-05-27	1972-06-09	No	1997-09-18
Madagascar	1966-12-30	No	No	No
Mali	No	1987-10-31	No	No
Malta	1966-10-01	No	No	2001-04-08
Mauritius	No	No	No	1995-09-07
Mexico	No	1972-10-19	No	No
Mongolia	No	No	No	2003-09-05
Montenegro	2001-12-27 (Note: Listed as "Serbia and Montenegro" in WCO PG0127E1a (status as at 1 July 2006); both successor states are treated individually.)	No	No	No
Morocco	No	1978-09-22	1973-11-03	No
Netherlands	1967-02-09	1971-01-20	1986-09-06	1997-09-18
New Zealand	1965-12-11	1978-02-28	1978-02-28	No
Niger	1965-12-11	1969-09-05	1972-06-21	No
Nigeria	No (Note: Nigeria applied the Seafarers Convention provisionally from 4 November 1969 but did not formally accede.)	No (Note: Nigeria applied the Scientific Equipment Convention provisionally from 4 November 1969 but did not formally accede.)	No	1995-09-07
North Macedonia	No	No	No	2006-07-21
Norway	1965-12-11	No	No	No
Pakistan	1966-12-27	No	No	No
Philippines	No	1973-07-10	1973-07-10	No
Poland	No	1971-09-14	1972-11-29	2001-06-15
Portugal	1968-02-10	1972-01-19	1975-09-03	1997-09-18
Romania	1967-06-07	1971-03-07	No	2003-02-26
Russia	No	No	No	1996-07-18
Rwanda	No	No	1971-09-10	No
Saudi Arabia	No	No	No	2024-06-25 (Note: Post-dates the WCO Istanbul Convention Handbook's 42-party Annex B.5 table (2006/2008 edition); sourced from a secondary compilation.)
Senegal	No	1971-08-19	1975-12-02	No
Serbia	2001-12-27	No	No	No
Sierra Leone	1966-12-07	No	No	No
Singapore	No	1969-12-08	No	No
Slovakia	No	1993-02-05	No	2000-12-22
Slovenia	1993-02-23	No	No	2001-01-23
Solomon Islands	No	1982-07-02	No	No
Somalia	No	No	1971-09-29	No
South Africa	1965-12-28	1971-12-28	1976-03-18	No
Spain	1967-01-07	1971-05-26	1973-02-17	1997-09-18
Sri Lanka	No	1991-05-23	1991-05-23	No
Sweden	1966-05-15	No	No	1997-09-18
Switzerland	1968-11-22 (Note: Extended to the Principality of Liechtenstein for as long as it is linked to Switzerland by a customs union treaty.)	1974-02-14 (Note: Extended to the Principality of Liechtenstein for as long as it is linked to Switzerland by a customs union treaty.)	1974-02-14 (Note: Extended to the Principality of Liechtenstein for as long as it is linked to Switzerland by a customs union treaty.)	1995-09-07
Syria	1975-07-30	1975-01-24	No	No
Tajikistan	No	No	No	1997-11-27
Tanzania	1976-03-08	No	No	No
Thailand	No	1971-01-16	No	No
Togo	No	No	1971-09-10	No
Tunisia	1965-12-11	No	1972-01-20	No
Turkey	1991-05-17	1991-05-17	1991-05-17	2005-03-15
Uganda	1967-09-19	1989-10-11	1989-10-11	No
Ukraine	No	No	No	2004-09-22
United Kingdom	1966-08-25	1969-09-30	No	1997-09-18
Zimbabwe	No	1987-02-05	1987-05-18	1995-09-07
Sources: UN Treaty Collection registrations 8012 (Seafarers, 1964), 9884 (Scientific Equipment, 1968), 11650 (Pedagogic Material, 1970), "Date of Effect" column; WCO status papers PG0127E1a, PG0128E1a, PG0130E1a (all as at 1 July 2006) for entries not in or post-dating UN registrations; WCO Istanbul Convention Handbook, Annex B.5 entry-into-force table (42 Contracting Parties); post-2006 Annex B.5 accessions from a secondary compilation as noted.

Annex B.6 replaces only the customs provisions (Articles 2 and 5) of the 1954 Touring Convention, while Annex B.7 separately replaces that convention's 1954 Tourist Publicity Protocol in full.

Contracting parties — Customs Facilities for Touring Convention (1954) and Tourist Publicity Protocol (1954), and Istanbul Convention Annexes B.6 and B.7
Contracting party	Touring Convention (1954)	Tourist Publicity Protocol (1954)	Istanbul Convention Annex B.6	Istanbul Convention Annex B.7
Albania	2010-08-09	2010-08-09	No	2009-08-28 (Note: Post-dates the WCO Istanbul Convention Handbook's entry-into-force table (2006/2008 edition); sourced from a secondary compilation.)
Algeria	1963-10-31	1963-10-31	1998-08-08	1998-08-08
Andorra	No	No	1998-12-02	1998-12-02
Argentina	1986-12-19	1986-12-19	No	No
Australia	1967-01-06	1967-01-06	No	No
Austria	1956-03-30	1956-03-30	1995-08-11	1997-09-18
Barbados	1971-03-05	1971-03-05	No	No
Belarus	No	No	No	No
Belgium	1955-02-21	1955-02-21	1997-09-18	1997-09-18
Bosnia and Herzegovina	1993-09-01	No	No	No
Brazil	No	No	2016-06-28	No
Bulgaria	1959-10-07	1959-10-07	2003-06-11	2003-06-11
Cambodia	1955-11-29	No (Note: Cambodia signed but did not ratify the Tourist Publicity Protocol.)	No	No
Canada	1955-06-01	No	No	No
Central African Republic	1962-10-15	1962-10-15	No	No
Chile	1974-08-15	1974-08-15	No	No
Costa Rica	1963-09-04	1963-09-04	No	No
Croatia	1994-08-31	No	1999-06-01	1999-06-01
Cuba	1963-10-23	1964-06-29	No	No
Cyprus	1963-05-16	1963-05-16	2005-01-25	2005-01-25
Czech Republic	No	1993-06-02	2000-02-24	2000-02-24
Denmark	1955-10-13	1955-10-13	1997-09-18	1997-09-18
Ecuador	1962-08-30	1962-08-30	No	No
Egypt	1957-04-04	1957-04-04	No	No
El Salvador	1958-06-18	1958-06-18	No	No
Estonia	No	No	1996-04-17	No
European Union	No	No	1997-09-18	1997-09-18
Fiji	1972-10-31	1972-10-31	No	No
Finland	1962-06-21	1962-06-21	1997-09-18	1997-09-18
France	1959-04-24	1959-04-24	1997-09-18	1997-09-18
Germany	1957-09-16	1957-09-16	1997-09-18	1997-09-18
Ghana	1958-06-16	1958-06-16	No	No
Greece	1974-01-15	1974-01-15	1997-09-18	1997-09-18
Haiti	1958-02-12	1958-02-12	No	No
Holy See	No (Note: The Holy See signed but did not ratify the Touring Convention.)	No	No	No
Honduras	No (Note: Honduras signed but did not ratify the Touring Convention.)	No	No	No
Hungary	1963-10-29	1963-10-29	2004-07-18	2004-07-18
India	1958-05-05	1957-02-15	No	No
Indonesia	No	No	2015-02-17	No
Iran	1968-04-03	1968-04-03	No	No
Ireland	1967-08-14	1967-08-14	1997-09-18	1997-09-18
Israel	1957-08-01	1957-08-01	No	No
Italy	1958-02-12	1958-02-12	1997-09-18	1997-09-18
Jamaica	1963-11-11	1963-11-11	No	No
Japan	1955-09-07	1955-09-07	No	No
Jordan	1957-12-18	1957-12-18	No	No
Kazakhstan	No	No	2013-11-21	No
Latvia	No	No	1999-10-16	1999-10-16
Lebanon	1971-03-16	1971-03-16	No	No
Liberia	2005-09-16	2005-09-16	No	No
Lithuania	2005-12-01	2005-12-01	1998-05-26	2004-02-06
Luxembourg	1956-11-21	1956-11-21	1997-09-18	1997-09-18
Malaysia	1958-05-07	1958-05-07	No	No
Mali	1973-08-01	1974-06-11	No	No
Malta	1966-01-03	1968-07-29	2001-04-08	2001-04-08
Mauritius	1969-07-18	1969-07-18	No	No
Mexico	1957-06-13	1957-06-13	No	No
Monaco	No (Note: Monaco signed but did not ratify the Touring Convention.)	No	No	No
Montenegro	2006-10-23	2006-10-23	2008-09-23	No
Morocco	1957-09-25	1957-09-25	No	No
Nepal	1960-09-21	1960-09-21	No	No
Netherlands	1958-03-07	1958-03-07	1997-09-18	1997-09-18
New Zealand	1962-08-17	1962-08-17	No	No
Nigeria	1961-06-26	1961-06-26	1995-08-11	1997-09-18
North Macedonia	No	No	2006-07-21	2006-07-21
Norway	1961-10-10	1961-10-10	No	No
Peru	1959-01-16	1959-01-16	No	No
Philippines	1960-02-09	1960-02-19	2022-04-17	No
Poland	1960-03-16	1960-03-16	2001-06-15	2001-06-15
Portugal	1958-09-18	1958-09-18	1997-09-18	1997-09-18
Romania	1961-01-26	1961-01-26	2003-02-26	2003-02-26
Russia	1959-08-17	1959-08-17	No	No
Rwanda	1964-12-01	1964-12-01	No	No
Senegal	1972-04-19	1972-04-19	No	No
Serbia	2001-03-12	2001-03-12	No	No
Sierra Leone	1962-03-13	1962-03-13	No	No
Singapore	— (Note: Singapore acceded to the Touring Convention on 22 November 1966 but subsequently denounced it with effect from 3 February 2001.)	1966-11-22	No	No
Slovakia	No	1993-05-28	2000-12-22	2000-12-22
Slovenia	1992-07-06	No	2001-01-23	2001-01-23
Solomon Islands	1981-09-03	1981-09-03	No	No
Spain	1958-08-18	1958-09-05	1997-09-18	1997-09-18
Sri Lanka	1955-11-28	No	No	No
Sweden	1957-06-11	1957-06-11	1997-09-18	1997-09-18
Switzerland	1956-05-23 (Note: Applies to the Principality of Liechtenstein for as long as it is linked to Switzerland by a customs union treaty.)	1956-05-23 (Note: Applies to the Principality of Liechtenstein for as long as it is linked to Switzerland by a customs union treaty.)	1995-08-11	1997-09-18
Syria	1959-03-26	1959-03-26	No	No
Tanzania	1964-06-22	1964-06-22	No	No
Tonga	1977-11-11	1977-11-11	No	No
Trinidad and Tobago	1966-04-11	1966-04-11	No	No
Tunisia	1974-06-20	1974-06-20	No	No
Turkey	1983-04-26	1983-04-26	2005-03-15	2005-03-15
Uganda	1965-04-15	1965-04-15	No	No
Ukraine	No	No	2004-09-22	2004-09-22
United Kingdom	1956-02-27	1956-02-27	1997-09-18	1997-09-18
United States	1956-07-25	No	No	No
Uruguay	1967-09-08	No	No	No
Vietnam	1956-01-31	No	No	No
Zimbabwe	No	No	1995-08-11	No
Sources: UN Treaty Collection Chapter XI.A.6 (Touring Convention, status as at 14 June 2026); XI.A.7 (Tourist Publicity Protocol, status as at 14 June 2026); WCO Istanbul Convention Handbook, Annex B.6 entry-into-force table (38 Contracting Parties) and Annex B.7 entry-into-force table (36 Contracting Parties); post-2006 accessions from a secondary compilation as noted.

==== National laws ====
Beyond the categories of goods covered by the ATA Convention and the Istanbul Convention annexes, many contracting parties accept ATA Carnets for additional categories of temporary admission under their own national customs laws and regulations. The WCO's ATA Handbook records each contracting party's notified scope, including such national-law extensions, as of its 2002 edition; current government sources confirm that several of these extensions remain in place, sometimes with updated terms.

Temporary admission operations under national laws and regulations, by contracting party
Contracting party	Categories accepted under national law	Source
China	Sporting goods, accepted under national law from 1 January 2020, despite China not having accepted Istanbul Convention Annex B.6.	
Canada	(2002) Goods connected with conventions, meetings, exhibitions, sporting and entertainment events, including official paraphernalia of a foreign organization sold at a convention it holds, athletic and theatrical equipment brought by non-resident performers, and press and broadcast equipment for covering news and sports events. (current) CBSA guidance confirms goods imported for a CBSA-recognized convention, meeting, trade show, exhibition or event may be documented on an ATA Carnet, including official paraphernalia bearing a foreign organization's registered symbol; separate guidance extends temporary-importation treatment to goods imported for testing, certification by an accredited organization, and emergency response.	
Japan	(2002) Reusable containers and similar receptacles used repeatedly for the transportation of goods, articles for academic research, articles for trial or testing, and samples for soliciting orders. (current) Japan Customs confirms continued acceptance of articles for scientific research and articles for testing under Article 17 of the Customs Tariff Law.	
Poland	Packings suitable for repeated use and articles for the personal use of travellers crossing the frontier, under a ministerial order of 17 February 1962.	
Czech Republic	Goods imported for educational, pedagogic or cultural purposes; tourist publicity material; sports equipment for competitions, shows or training; goods imported for humanitarian use such as medical and laboratory goods.	
Denmark	Costumes and decoration sets for film production; tourist publicity material; racing vehicles; touring artists' performance effects; circus and fair equipment; films shown to prospective buyers or hirers.	
Finland	Goods for international festivals, sports contests or congresses; theatrical-performance goods; goods for testing or demonstration; tools loaned free of charge by a foreign buyer to a local manufacturer for producing export goods.	
France	Horses participating in competitions, temporarily imported and exported with their equipment.	
Germany	Professional articles imported by travellers for a period of use not exceeding six months, where not otherwise treated as personal professional equipment.	
Hungary	Goods admitted for demonstration, testing or use at exhibitions, fairs and competitions; commercial travellers' samples; models for the manufacture of goods imported for inward processing.	
Israel	Travellers' personal effects; sports equipment for use at sports events; positive film prints intended solely for screening before prospective distribution buyers.	
Italy	Animals, boats and equipment used solely at sports events; horses with their saddlery for races and shows; arms and ammunition carried by shooting-competition participants; trophies presented as prizes.	
Lebanon	Goods, apparatus and products of a new type intended for testing; cinematographic equipment; exhibition equipment; other professional equipment brought by non-Lebanese persons or firms; press, radio and television correspondents' equipment.	
Malaysia	Goods admitted under Section 97 of the Customs Act 1967 and Item 29 of the Sales Tax (Exemption) Order 1980.	
Malta	Spare parts for the repair of tourists' private vehicles; commercial samples.	
New Zealand	Goods generally admitted for up to twelve months, other than goods for processing or repair, normal manufacturing or commercial use, television advertising film or videotape, and unmarkable unique articles.	
Romania	Sports equipment for competitions; scientific equipment for research and education; material for theatrical and similar performances; film copies for viewing by potential renters.	
Qatar	Professional broadcasting equipment under Annex B.2, approved on an exceptional basis during the 2022 FIFA World Cup (October–December 2022); Qatar's normal coverage at the time was limited to Annexes A and B.1. The WCO's Istanbul Convention synopsis has since recorded Qatar as accepting Annex B.2 with a reservation.	
Senegal	Sporting goods imported by foreign nationals to take part in international contests held in Senegal.	
Singapore	Samples for demonstration, testing or soliciting orders; goods for exhibitions and fairs; equipment for theatrical performances; professional and cinematographic equipment for the press, radio, film and television.	
South Africa	Commercial samples owned abroad and imported to solicit orders for goods to be supplied from abroad.	
Spain	All cases of temporary admission provided for under Spanish national law, including competition vehicles and animals.	
Sweden	Goods for use at international sports contests; articles shown to prospective resellers or other buyers.	
Switzerland	Sports equipment for contests, where a temporary admission document is still required.	
United Kingdom	Teaching aids; positive cinematographic films intended for projection before commercial use.	
Entries marked "(2002)" or with no date marker reflect the position recorded in the 2nd edition of the WCO's ATA Handbook (2002) and may not capture subsequent changes to national practice. Entries marked "(current)" have been independently confirmed against current government sources. Bulgaria, Cyprus, Greece, Iceland, Iran, Ireland, Luxembourg, the Netherlands, Slovakia, Slovenia, Sri Lanka, Thailand, Turkey and the United States notified no national-law extensions in the same edition of the Handbook.

==== Special application cases ====
Due to bilateral, multilateral or subnational customs agreements, the following cases are possible:

- countries which accept ATA Carnets even without having signed any Convention (e.g. Monaco, Liechtenstein, San Marino, etc.);
- countries which delegate their power in areas covered by the convention to supranational entities (e.g. European Union Customs Union, Macau, China);
- territories which are part of a contracting party sovereign state but are not part of the same customs territory and do not accept carnets (e.g. Greenland);
- territories which are part of a contracting party sovereign state but are not part of the same customs territory and accept carnets independently (e.g. Canary Islands, Faroe Islands, etc.);
- ATA Carnets not being accepted or not necessary between contracting party sovereign states in view of a customs union agreement (e.g. between member states of the European Union);
- ATA Carnets having special conditions between contracting party sovereign states in view of a customs union agreement (e.g. Andorra–EU).

Countries which accept ATA Carnets even without having signed any Convention
Liechtenstein	Territorial application of Switzerland extended to Liechtenstein via their customs union established by the Treaty of 29 March 1923.
Monaco	Territorial application of France extended to Monaco via their customs union.
San Marino	Territorial application of the European Union extended to San Marino via their Cooperation and Customs Union Agreement.
Botswana, Namibia, Eswatini, Lesotho	Territorial application of South Africa extended to Botswana, Namibia, Eswatini and Lesotho via the Southern African Customs Union (SACU).

Countries and territories which delegate their power in areas covered by the convention to supranational entities
European Union member states	In virtue of their European Union Customs Union, EU member states apply the ATA Convention and Istanbul Convention as part of EU law.
Macau, China	China extended the application of the ATA Convention (and subsequently the Istanbul Convention) to the Macao Special Administrative Region with effect from 20 December 1999, allowing the Macao Chamber of Commerce to join the ATA guarantee chain as a separately-recognised guaranteeing organisation.

Territories which are part of a contracting party but are not part of the same customs territory and do not accept carnets
Greenland	Denmark — Greenland is not part of the Danish customs territory and the ATA Convention has not been extended to it.
Curaçao, Sint Maarten, Caribbean Netherlands (formerly Netherlands Antilles)	Netherlands — The WCO Istanbul Convention Handbook (2006 edition) confirmed the Curaçao Chamber of Commerce as issuing and guaranteeing association for the Netherlands Antilles under the Netherlands' Istanbul Convention territorial application ("The Kingdom of the Netherlands (The Kingdom in Europe and the Netherlands Antilles)"). Following the dissolution of the Netherlands Antilles on 10 October 2010, Curaçao and Sint Maarten became separate constituent countries of the Kingdom; Bonaire, Sint Eustatius and Saba became Caribbean Netherlands (special municipalities of the Netherlands proper). The current status of ATA Carnet operations in these territories has not been independently confirmed from ICC/WATAC sources since that date.
Aruba	Netherlands — Aruba became a separate constituent country of the Kingdom of the Netherlands in 1986 and is not covered by the Istanbul Convention's Netherlands territorial application, which specifies only "the Netherlands Antilles". Under earlier ATA-related conventions (Professional Equipment, Exhibitions/Fairs), the Netherlands explicitly extended coverage to "the Netherlands Antilles and to Aruba"; this explicit extension has not been confirmed for the Istanbul Convention.
Svalbard and Jan Mayen	Norway — ATA Carnets are not accepted in these territories, which are outside the Norwegian customs territory.

Territories which are part of a contracting party but are not part of the same customs territory and accept carnets independently
Gibraltar	United Kingdom — Gibraltar is covered under the UK's ATA Convention extension (territorial application registered with the UN on 11 February 1969, UN Treaty Series vol. 658, No. 6864) and accepts ATA Carnets independently through the Gibraltar Chamber of Commerce. Gibraltar enacted its own domestic implementing legislation — the Imports and Exports (ATA Convention) Regulations 2020 (LN.2020/510) — with effect from 24 December 2020. As of that date only the 1961 ATA Convention, and not the Istanbul Convention annexes, had been extended to Gibraltar.
Faroe Islands	Denmark — The Faroe Islands are not part of the Danish customs territory nor of the EU, but accept ATA Carnets.
Canary Islands, Ceuta, Melilla	Spain — These territories are not part of the EU VAT territory and accept ATA Carnets independently, covered by the Spanish NGA.
Åland	Finland — The Åland Islands are not part of the Finnish VAT territory nor the EU VAT area, but accept ATA Carnets.

ATA Carnets not accepted or not necessary between contracting party sovereign states in view of a customs union
European Union member states	ATA Carnets are not required between EU member states, which form a single customs territory. Goods moving between EU member states are in free circulation and no temporary admission procedures apply.

ATA Carnets with special conditions between contracting party sovereign states
Andorra–European Union	Goods covered by an ATA Carnet issued in one of the contracting parties may be temporarily admitted to the other under special conditions reflecting the Andorra–EU customs agreement.
Turkey–European Union	Under the EU–Turkey Customs Union, goods of one part of the customs union which are placed under a temporary admission procedure in the other part are covered by ATA Carnet, but must be handled differently from goods originating outside the union.

== CPD China-Taiwan Carnet ==
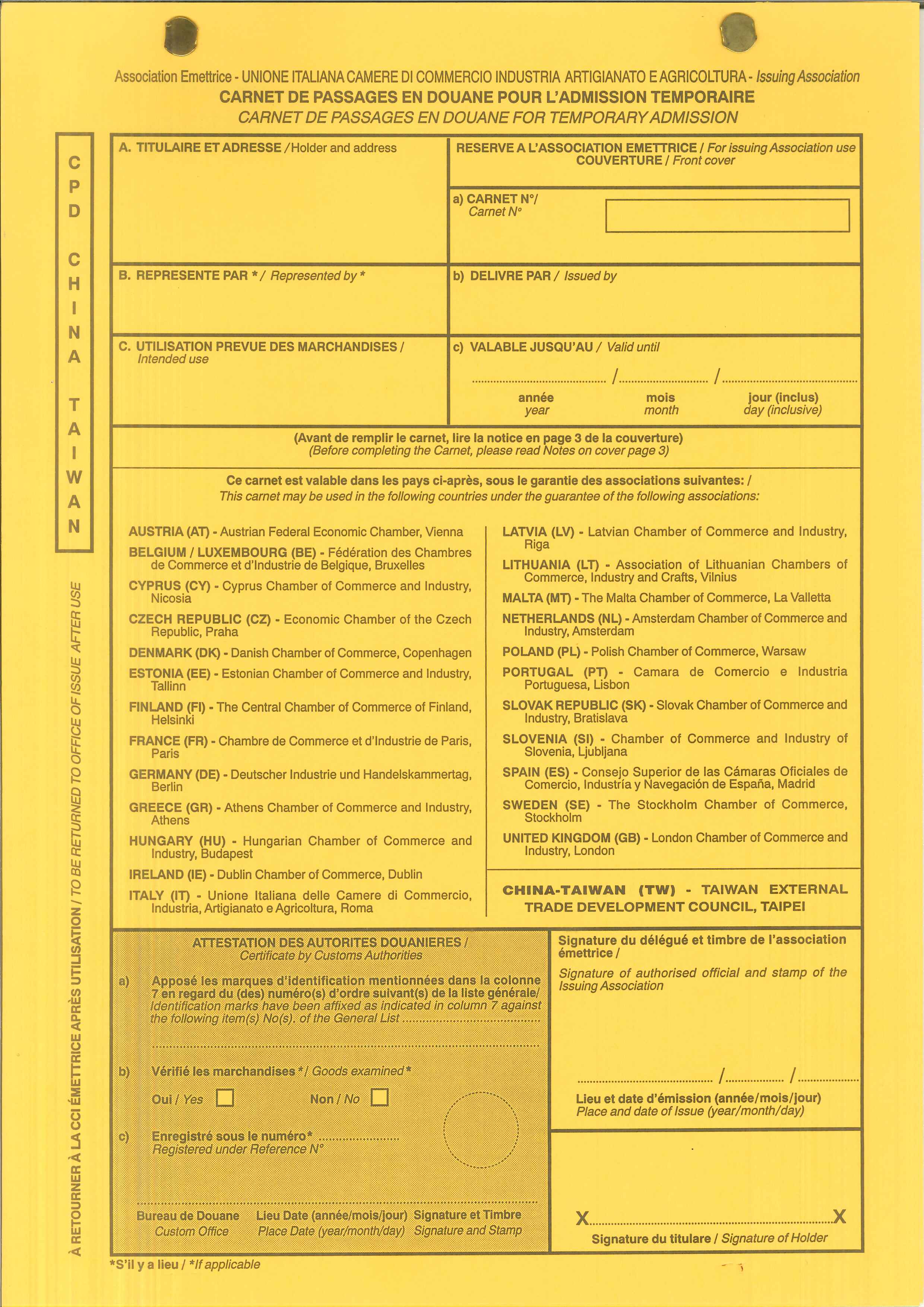
A front cover page of a CPD China-Taiwan Carnet

A system similar to the ATA Carnet System generally called Carnet de Passages en Douane China-Taiwan (CPD China-Taiwan) operates on the basis of bilateral agreements between Taiwan (under the name of Chinese Taipei) and a certain number of ATA countries including the EU member states, Australia, Canada, India, Israel, Japan, Korea, Malaysia, New Zealand, Norway, Singapore, South Africa, Switzerland and the United States of America (under the name of TECRO/AIT carnet). Other than a different colour code to distinguish it from the ATA Carnet, the conditions for its use, the goods for which it can be used, and customs procedures are identical. The CPD China-Taiwan Carnet is not to be confused with the also named CPD Carnet used to temporarily import motor vehicles into foreign countries.

Territory issuing CPD China-Taiwan Carnets	National Guaranteeing Association	Website
Chinese Taipei	Taiwan External Trade Development Council (TAITRA)	https://en.taitra.org.tw/

Countries/territories which have signed a CPD China-Taiwan agreement	Signing date	Operational
Australia	21 December 1995	Yes
Canada	10 November 1994	Yes
El Salvador	24 August 2001	No
European Union	20 March 1991	Yes
India	20 March 2013	Yes
Israel	10 July 2003	Yes
Japan	21 May 2001	Yes
Malaysia	5 July 2004	Yes
New Zealand	2 December 1993	Yes
Norway	13 March 2000	Yes
Philippines	19 August 1998	No
Singapore	9 April 1990	Yes
South Africa	7 August 1991	Yes
South Korea	28 November 1990	Yes
Switzerland	15 July 1993	Yes
United States	25 June 1996	Yes
Vietnam	6 June 2009	No

== See also ==
- Carnet de Passages en Douane
- TIR Convention
- Certificate of origin
- Trade facilitation
