= International Convention to Facilitate the Importation of Commercial Samples and Advertising Material =

1952 multilateral treaty

The International Convention to Facilitate the Importation of Commercial Samples and Advertising Material is a 1952 United Nations multilateral treaty. States that ratify the treaty agree to allow product samples and advertising material into the county duty-free.

The Convention allows the duty-free importation of commercial samples that are determined to be of "negligible value". It also allows the duty-free importation of advertising material such as catalogues, price lists, and trade notices.

The convention was concluded in Geneva on 7 November 1952. It was signed by six states and entered into force on 20 November 1955. The convention was soon complemented by the Customs Convention Regarding the E.C.S. Carnets for Commercial Samples which entered into force on 3 October 1957 and then virtually superseded by the Customs Convention on the A.T.A. Carnet for the Temporary Admission of Goods in 1961.

As of 2013, the convention had 66 state parties.

== See also ==
- ATA Carnet
- Product sample
- Mailing list
