= Customs Convention on Containers =

1956 United Nations and International Maritime Organization treaty

The Customs Convention on Containers is a United Nations and International Maritime Organization treaty whereby states agree to allow intermodal containers to be temporarily brought into their states duty- and tax-free.

The original Convention was concluded in Geneva on 18 May 1956 and entered into force on 4 August 1959. On 2 December 1972, a new Convention was concluded with the provision that when it entered into force, it would replace the 1956 Convention for the parties that ratify it. The 1972 Convention entered into force on 6 December 1975. The 1956 Convention was ratified by 44 states; as of 2016, the 1972 Convention has been ratified by 40 states. The International Container Bureau was instrumental in the creation of the revised 1972 Convention.

The Convention allows for shipping containers to be brought from a ratifying state into a ratifying state duty- and tax-free for a period of three months.

The Convention was concluded at the same conference that concluded the Customs Convention on the Temporary Importation of Commercial Road Vehicles, the Customs Convention on the Temporary Importation for Private Use of Aircraft and Pleasure Boats, and the CMR Convention.

The Convention was somewhat superseded in 1990 by the Istanbul Convention, which combines in one single instrument the various conventions on the temporary admission of specific goods.

== See also ==
- ATA Carnet
