= Customs Convention on the Temporary Importation of Private Road Vehicles =

1954 United Nations multilateral treaty

The Customs Convention on the Temporary Importation of Private Road Vehicles is a 1954 United Nations multilateral treaty. In states that adhere to the Convention, it allows individuals that are temporarily visiting a country – such as tourists or individuals on student visas – to import a road vehicle to the country duty-free.

The Convention was concluded in New York City on 4 June 1954 at the same conference the Convention concerning Customs Facilities for Touring was concluded. The Convention entered into force on 15 December 1957. It was signed by 32 states and as of 2013 has 80 parties, which includes 79 United Nations member states plus the European Union. The states that have signed the Convention but have not ratified it are Argentina, Cambodia, Dominican Republic, Guatemala, Holy See, Honduras, Monaco, Panama, and Uruguay.

The Convention was somewhat superseded in 1990 by the Istanbul Convention, which combines in one single instrument the various conventions on the temporary admission of specific goods.

== See also ==
- ATA Carnet
- Customs Convention on the Temporary Importation of Commercial Road Vehicles
- Customs Convention on the Temporary Importation for Private Use of Aircraft and Pleasure Boats
