= Convention Concerning Customs Facilities for Touring =

1954 United Nations multilateral treaty

The Convention Concerning Customs Facilities for Touring is a 1954 United Nations multilateral treaty. In states that adhere to the Convention, it allows tourists to import personal effects into the country duty free so long as the effects are for the personal use of the tourist and they are carried on the person or in their luggage.

== Content ==
The Convention states that "personal effects" includes the following items:

- personal jewellery;
- one camera with twelve plates or five rolls of film;
- one miniature cinematograph camera with two reels of film;
- one pair of binoculars;
- one portable musical instrument;
- one portable gramophone with ten records;
- one portable sound-recording apparatus;
- one portable wireless receiving set;
- one portable television set;
- one portable typewriter;
- one perambulator;
- one tent and other camping equipment;
- sports equipment (one fishing outfit, one sporting firearm with fifty cartridges, one non-powered bicycle, one canoe or kayac less than 5 ½ metres long, one pair of skis, two tennis racquets, and other similar articles)

The Convention also states that the tourist may import the following items:

- 200 cigarettes, or 50 cigares, or 250 grammes of tobacco, or an assortment of these products, provided that the total weight does not exceed 250 grammes
- one regular-size bottle of wine and one-quarter-litre of spirits
- one-quarter-litre of toilet water and a small quantity of perfume
- travel souvenirs for a total value not exceeding USD$50.

The Convention also permits the duty-free exportation of travel souvenirs for a total value not exceeding US$100. A "tourist" is defined in the Convention as "any person without distinction as to race, sex, language, religion, who enters the territory of a Contracting State other than that in which that person normally resides and remains there for not less than twenty-four hours and not more than six months in the course of any twelve-month period, for legitimate non-immigrant purposes, such as touring, recreation, sports, health, family reasons, study, religious pilgrimages or business".

== Creation and ratification ==
The Convention was concluded in New York City on 4 June 1954 at the same conference that the Customs Convention on the Temporary Importation of Private Road Vehicles was concluded. It was signed by 32 states and entered into force on 11 September 1957. As of 2013, 79 states have ratified the treaty. The states that have signed but not ratified the Convention are Dominican Republic, Guatemala, Holy See, Honduras, Monaco, and Panama. Singapore ratified the Convention in 1966 but denounced it in 1999, with effect from 2001.

== Subsequent developments ==
The Convention was somewhat superseded in 1990 by the Istanbul Convention, which combines in one single instrument the various conventions on the temporary admission of specific goods.

== See also ==
- ATA Carnet
- Text
- Ratifications
