= Customs Convention on the Temporary Importation of Commercial Road Vehicles =

1956 United Nations multilateral treaty

The Customs Convention on the Temporary Importation of Commercial Road Vehicles is a 1956 United Nations multilateral treaty. In states that adhere to the Convention, it allows commercial road vehicles—such as taxis, buses, and semi-trailer trucks—to temporarily travel within the country duty free.

The Convention was concluded in Geneva on 18 May 1956 and was patterned after the Customs Convention on the Temporary Importation of Private Road Vehicles. It was concluded on the same day as the Customs Convention on Containers and the Customs Convention on the Temporary Importation for Private Use of Aircraft and Pleasure Boats.

The Convention entered into force on 8 April 1959. It was signed by 12 states and as of 2013 has 42 parties, which includes 41 United Nations member states plus the European Union.

The Convention was somewhat superseded in 1990 by the Istanbul Convention, which combines in one single instrument the various conventions on the temporary admission of specific goods.

== See also ==
- ATA Carnet
