= Customs Convention on the Temporary Importation for Private Use of Aircraft and Pleasure Boats =

1956 United Nations multilateral treaty

The Customs Convention on the Temporary Importation for Private Use of Aircraft and Pleasure Boats is a 1956 United Nations multilateral treaty. In states that adhere to the convention, it allows individuals that are temporarily visiting a country—such as tourists—to import an aircraft or pleasure boat to the country duty free so long as the aircraft or boat will be used exclusively for private use.

The convention was patterned after the Customs Convention on the Temporary Importation of Private Road Vehicles and was concluded in Geneva on 18 May 1956, the same day the Customs Convention on Containers and the Customs Convention on the Temporary Importation of Commercial Road Vehicles was concluded.

The Convention entered into force on 1 January 1959. It was signed by 11 states and as of 2013 has 26 state parties.

The convention was somewhat superseded in 1990 by the Istanbul Convention, which combines in one single instrument the various conventions on the temporary admission of specific goods.

== See also ==
- ATA Carnet
