= Chamber of Commerce and Industry of Romania building =

Office building in Bucharest, Romania

Chamber of Commerce and Industry of Romania Building
- Interactive map of the Chamber of Commerce and Industry of Romania Building area

General information
- Status: Completed
- Location: Bucharest, Romania
- Coordinates: 44.423805°N 26.110428°E
- Construction started: 2000
- Opening: 2002
- Owner: Chamber of Commerce and Industry of Romania

Height
- Roof: 57 m (187 ft)

Technical details
- Floor count: 9
- Floor area: 9,450 m^{2} (101,700 sq ft)
- Lifts/elevators: 9

Chamber of Commerce and Industry of Romania Building or CCIR Building is an office building located in the city of Bucharest, Romania. It stands at a height of 57 meters and has 9 floors, with a total of 9,450 m^{2} floor space.
