= Product sample =

Sample of a consumer product to try

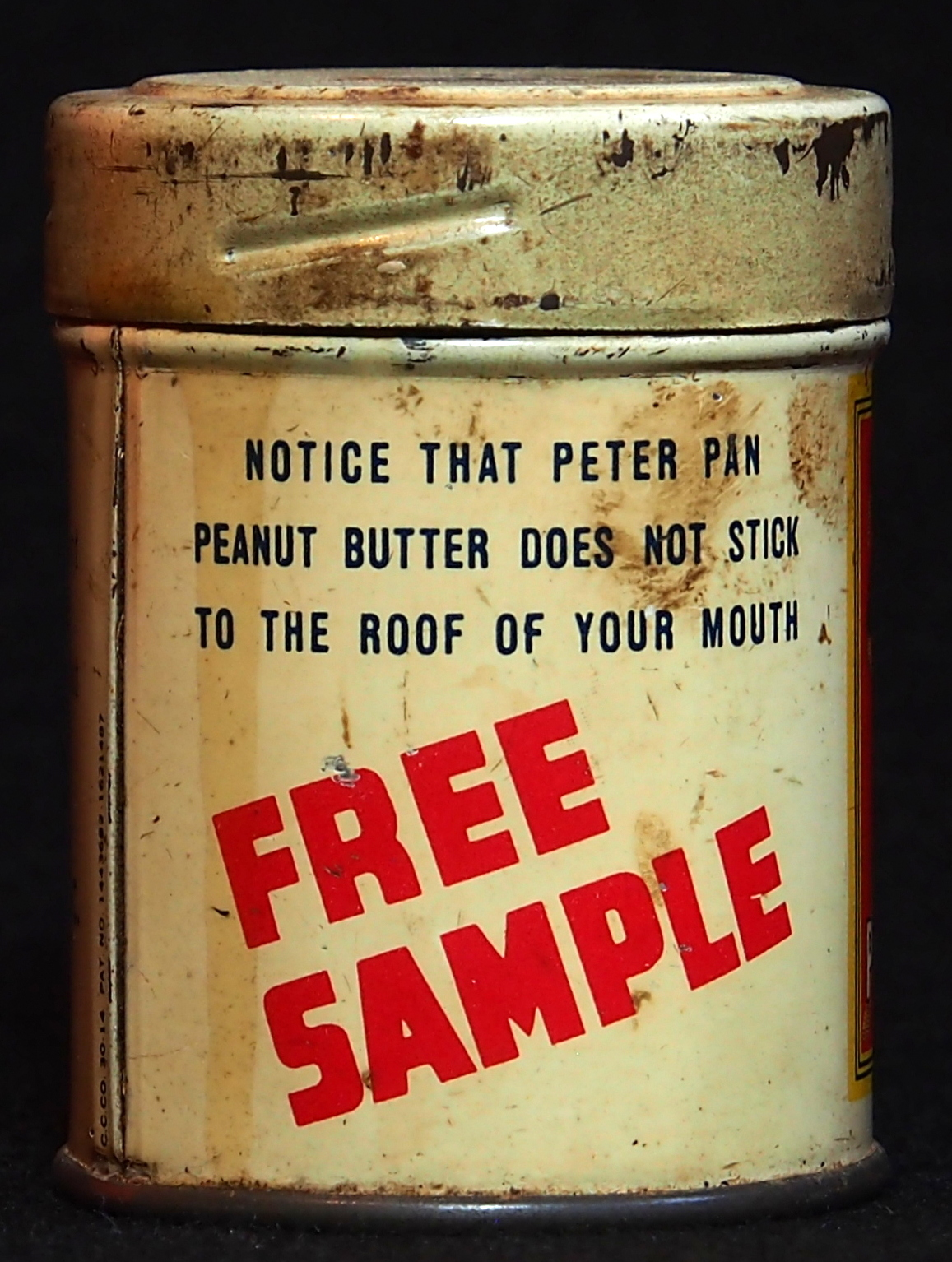
Free sample of Peter Pan peanut butter, promising it "does not stick to the roof of your mouth"

A product sample is a sample of a consumer product that is given to the consumer, often free of charge, so that they may try a product before committing to a purchase. When it comes to marketing non-durable commodities, such as food items, sampling is crucial. It gives room to highlight new items on the market as well as to bring back classic product categories with fresh tastes, inventive ingredients, and other changes.

== Free samples ==
A free sample or "freebie" or "trial packs" is a portion of food or other product (for example beauty products) given to consumers in shopping malls, supermarkets, retail stores, or through other channels (such as via the Internet). Sometimes samples of non-perishable items are included in direct marketing mailings. The purpose of a free sample is to acquaint the consumer with a new product, and is similar to the concept of a test drive, in that a customer is able to try out a product before purchasing it.

Many consumer product companies now offer free samples through their websites, to encourage consumers to use the products regularly, and to gather data for mailing lists of potentially interested customers. Paint chips are samples of paint colors that are sometimes offered as free samples.

=== History ===
19th-century soap manufacturer Benjamin T. Babbitt was one of the first known people, though not the first ever, to offer free samples of his products. For example, innkeepers are portrayed offering free samples in the 14th-century poem Piers Plowman: "Tauerners 'a tast for nouht' tolden the same" (Innkeepers said the same thing, 'A taste for free!').

In the 1900s, bags containing product samples from vendors became a common sight at Australian agricultural shows, where they were given away for free or at a small cost. These so-called "sample bags" gradually evolved into the product branded showbags still popular today in the country.

In 1987 C. A. Courtesy became the first demonstration company to secure exclusivity with a retailer.

The expansion of online marketing with regards to promotional giveaways has facilitated the rise of "Freebie sites" that seek to aggregate all promotional free sample offers in one place. These sites will often compile free product samples from all over the World Wide Web and categorize them by type. Some product sample offers may require consumers to complete a survey or refer a friend in order to qualify for the freebies. When all requirements are fulfilled, the product samples are shipped to the consumer. Some sample products might be digital goods, where sample might be closely related to a product trial.

== Other samples ==
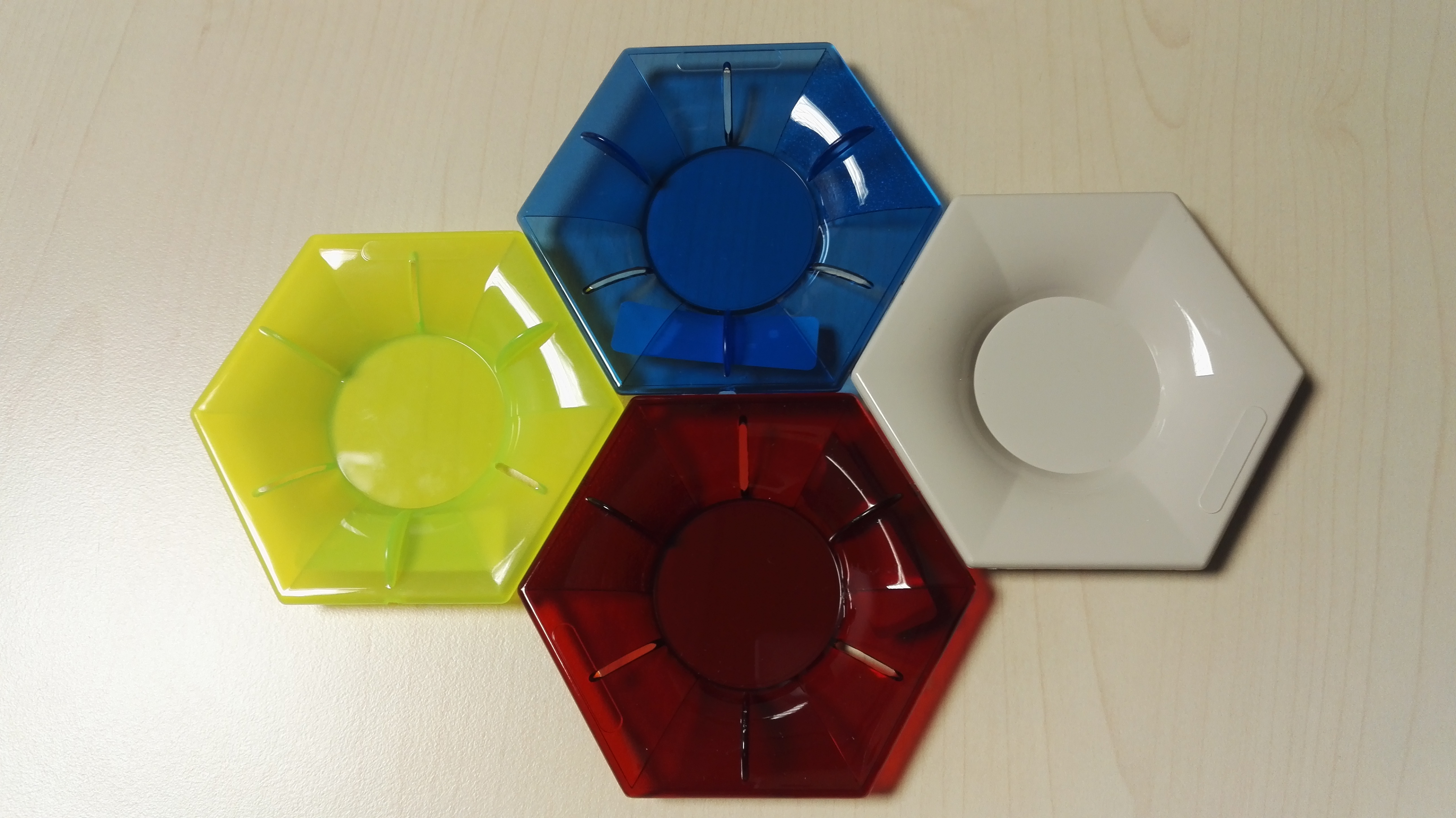
So-called "color chips" or color samples, used in the plastic industry to help designers visually identify available colors of plastic pellets.

It is also possible to purchase products in small "trial size" containers. This is common with toiletries such as shampoo, which are useful for vacations or other travel, where large bottles or other containers would be impractical (or more recently, not permitted for air travel). These are also often provided in hotel and motel rooms for the guests. Samples may also be loaned to the customer if they are too valuable to be given for free, such as samples of a countertop or of carpet to be used for remodeling. Sometimes companies in business-to-business markets will offer sample of data or service for free before engaging business relationship.

Other type of samples may include industrial samples, such as in the plastic industry, provided to companies for trial molding to see if the selected material is suitable for manufacturing the application (testing). Such samples may or may not be free of charge.

== See also ==
- International Convention to Facilitate the Importation of Commercial Samples and Advertising Material
- Sample (material)
- Mailing list
- Test drive
- Shareware
