= Lost luggage =

Traveller's accoutrements which fail to reach their intended destination

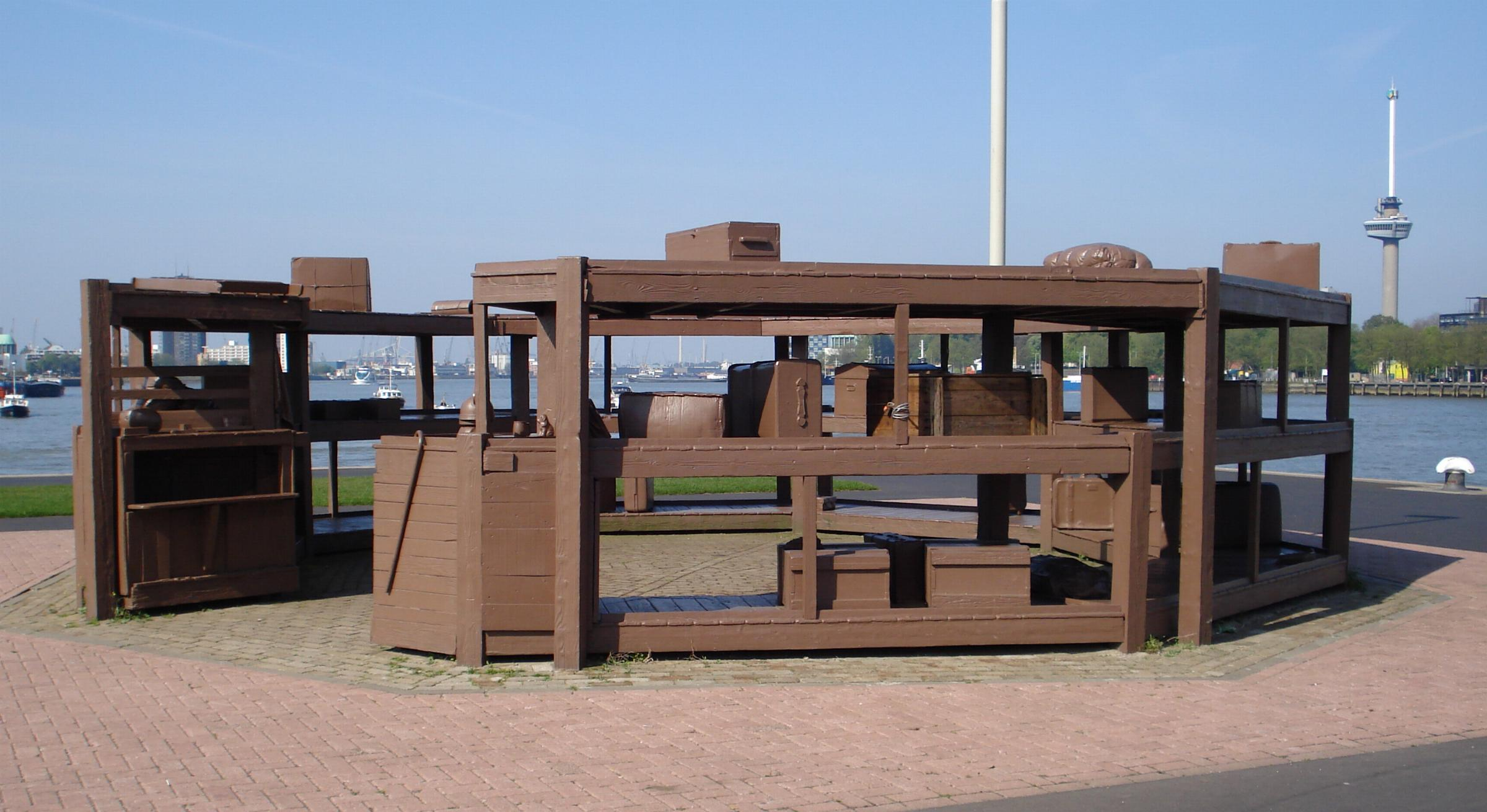
Sculpture Lost Luggage Depot (2001) by the Canadian artist Jeff Wall, Wilhelminakade, Rotterdam

Lost luggage, known in the air transport industry as mishandled baggage, is luggage conveyed by a public carrier such as an airline, seafaring cruise ship, shipping company, or railway which fails to arrive at the correct destination with the passenger.

Most mishandled baggage is delayed rather than permanently lost. The air transport technology provider SITA, which operates the WorldTracer baggage-tracing system used by more than 500 airlines and ground handlers at around 2,800 airports, reported that about 24 million bags were delayed, misrouted, damaged or lost worldwide in 2025, a rate of 4.9 bags for every 1,000 passengers. Delayed and misrouted bags accounted for more than 75 per cent of cases, damaged bags for 21 per cent and permanently lost bags for about 4 per cent.

Mishandling rates vary widely between world regions and are several times higher on international services than on domestic ones, and the metrics used by industry bodies and by national regulators are not directly comparable. Rates fell by roughly three-quarters between 2007 and 2025, a decline the industry attributes largely to automated baggage tracking. The trend was interrupted by the COVID-19 pandemic: as air travel resumed in 2022 the global rate rose by 75 per cent in a single year, with airports and airlines in Europe and in Australia among the worst affected. Carrier liability for baggage on international journeys is governed by the Montreal Convention and, on routes between states that have not ratified it, by its predecessor the Warsaw Convention.

== Causes ==
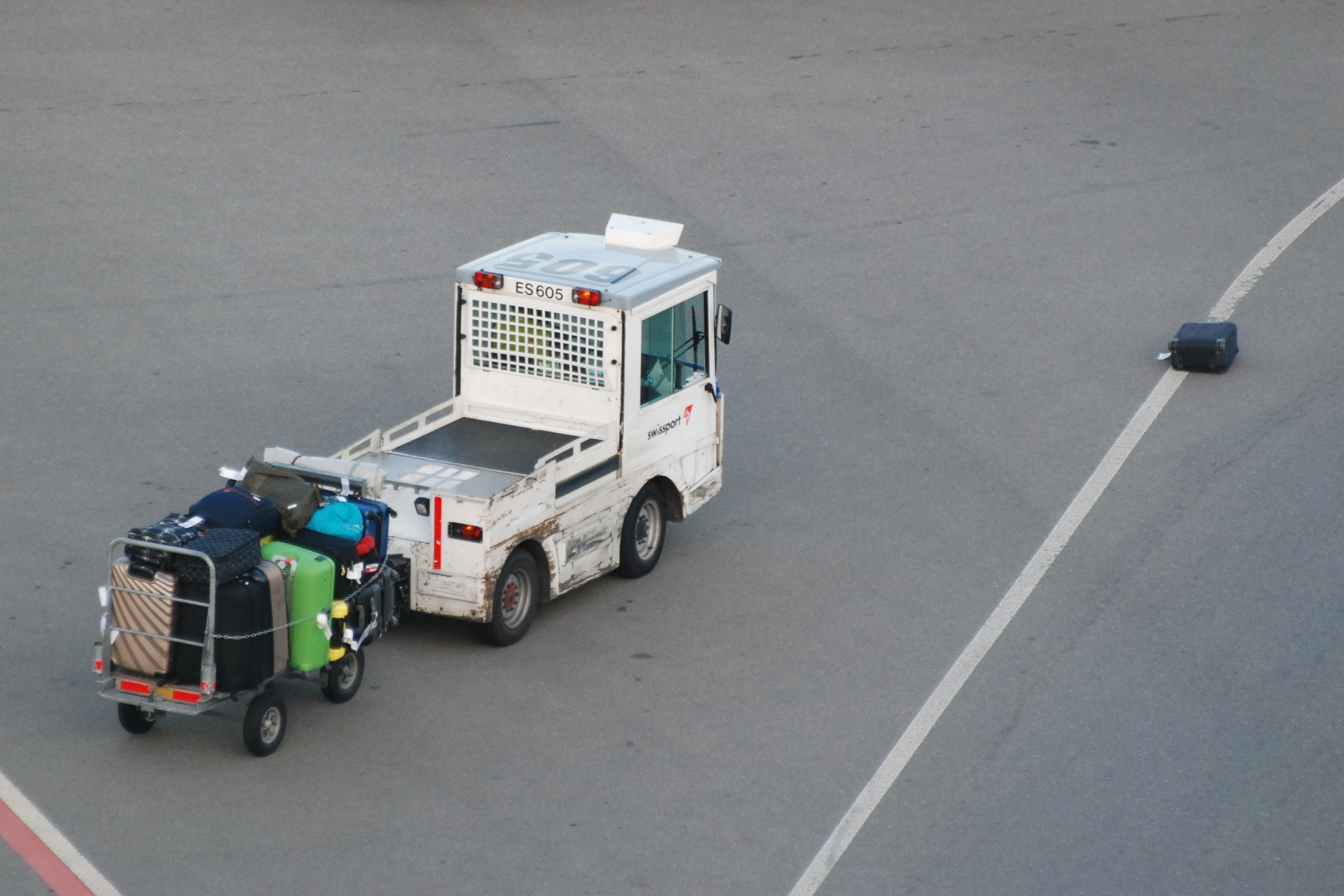
Airport baggage vehicle returns to its lost luggage at the edge of the marked "road" on the tarmac.

Luggage is more likely to be lost or misdirected if the journey has several legs, as each transfer between different vehicles increases the chance that bags will be mishandled. Industry data bear this out. SITA attributed 39 per cent of all mishandling in 2025 to transfers between flights, and reported that the more numerous and the tighter a journey's connections, the higher the probability of mishandling. For the same reason, international services mishandle bags at far higher rates than domestic ones: in 2025 the global figures were 9.12 mishandled bags per 1,000 passengers on international routes against 1.65 on domestic routes.

Of the mishandling recorded in 2024, SITA attributed 41 per cent to transfer, 17 per cent to tagging, ticketing and security problems, 16 per cent to failure to load bags onto the aircraft, and 10 per cent to operational factors such as airport processes, weather, and aircraft space or weight limits.

There are many other causes of lost luggage. If a passenger arrives late for a flight, there may not be time for their luggage to be loaded onto the plane. If tags are accidentally torn off, the airport may not know where to send the luggage. Human error is also common: tags may be misread or luggage may be sent to the wrong place. Occasionally, a plane may lack sufficient space or have reached its maximum takeoff weight. Security delays can also cause bags to arrive on a later flight than their owner. Luggage is taken through customs after its owner claims it.

== Effects and passenger practice ==
In case of lost luggage, travellers are advised to carry all essentials in a carry-on bag, including a change of clothes and anything they would be greatly troubled to lose because of its monetary or emotional value (this excludes security restricted items, that can not be carried inside the passenger cabin). Occasionally luggage is completely lost and cannot be recovered. The airline will then normally compensate the owner. The passenger must then list the contents of their baggage and file a claim.

Bags can also be damaged during travel, but most damage (such as broken wheels and handles) is not covered under the airlines' contract of carriage. Some airlines, however, will still repair such damage as a good faith gesture, or offer a discount voucher for a future flight. In general airlines regard the purpose of luggage to be the protection of its contents during transit. If the luggage is damaged, even severely, but the contents are unharmed, then airlines regard the luggage as having fulfilled its purpose and will not compensate owners.

SITA estimated the cost of mishandling to the airline industry at US$6.3 billion in 2025, or about US$260 for each affected bag. Most of the cost of a delayed bag is operational, while most of the cost of a lost or damaged bag is compensation paid to the passenger.

=== Recovery ===
When a traveller reports luggage lost to an airport or airline, a case is opened with WorldTracer, a global network for tracing lost luggage operated by SITA and used by more than 500 airlines and ground handlers at approximately 2,800 airports. Of the bags mishandled in 2024, SITA reported that about two-thirds of cases were resolved and closed in WorldTracer within 48 hours.

Since 1 June 2018, IATA Resolution 753 has required member airlines to record custody of every checked bag at four points—acceptance from the passenger, loading onto the aircraft, transfer between carriers, and delivery on arrival—and to exchange that data with interline partners.

From December 2024, SITA integrated Apple's Find My "Share Item Location" feature into WorldTracer, allowing passengers who carry a Bluetooth tracking tag in a checked bag to share its location with the airline. After a year, 29 airlines had adopted the feature; SITA reported that bags whose location had been shared were 90 per cent less likely to be permanently lost and were recovered 26 per cent faster. A comparable integration with Google's Find Hub was announced in March 2026.

Most lost luggage is quickly sent by the airline to the correct destination. Airlines will often reimburse passengers for toiletries, clothing, and other essentials if the arrival airport is away from the passenger's home area. In most cases, when delayed luggage arrives, a courier service will deliver it to the passenger's home or hotel. The airline usually pays for this.

== Compensation ==
Compensation for lost luggage on international flights is governed by the Montreal Convention and its predecessor the Warsaw Convention. Under Article 22(2) of the Montreal Convention a carrier's liability for destroyed, lost, damaged or delayed baggage is limited to 1,519 special drawing rights (SDR) per passenger. That limit took effect on 28 December 2024, replacing the previous limit of 1,288 SDR; the Convention's limits are reviewed every five years under Article 24 and adjusted for inflation, and the 2024 revision raised them by about 18 per cent. Under the Warsaw Convention the maximum liability is 17 SDR per kilogram.

A passenger may obtain a higher limit by making a special declaration of interest at check-in and paying any supplementary sum required by the carrier. Article 17(3) of the Montreal Convention allows a passenger to enforce their rights against the carrier if the carrier admits the baggage is lost, or if it has not arrived within 21 days of the date on which it ought to have arrived. Complaints must be made in writing within seven days of receiving damaged checked baggage, and within 21 days of delivery where the baggage was delayed.

Several jurisdictions extend or supplement these rules:

- In the European Union, Regulation (EC) No 2027/97 as amended by Regulation (EC) No 889/2002 applies the Montreal Convention liability rules to Community air carriers on all their flights, including purely domestic ones, removing the distinction between national and international carriage.
- In Canada, the Air Passenger Protection Regulations apply the Montreal Convention limit to domestic flights and require airlines to refund any baggage fee paid when baggage is lost or damaged.
- In the United States, a separate limit applies to domestic itineraries. It rose from US$3,800 to US$4,700 with effect from 22 January 2025 and is adjusted for inflation every two years.

== Statistics ==
=== Global ===
SITA publishes an annual survey of baggage performance, Baggage IT Insights, which expresses mishandling as the number of bags mishandled per 1,000 departing passengers. On this measure the global rate fell by 59.7 per cent between 2007 and 2021. It then rose by 24 per cent in 2021 and by a further 75 per cent in 2022 as air travel resumed after the COVID-19 pandemic, before falling in each subsequent year to a reported low of 4.9 bags per 1,000 passengers in 2025.

Global mishandled baggage rate reported by SITA
Year	Mishandled bags per 1,000 passengers
2019	5.60
2021	4.35
2022	7.60
2023	6.90
2024	6.30
2025	4.90

Sources: SITA Baggage IT Insights, 2022–2026 editions.

About 24 million bags were mishandled in 2025, a fall of 19 per cent on the previous year, among roughly 5 billion passengers carried.

=== Regional variation ===
Performance differs markedly between world regions and between domestic and international flying, largely because of the number of transfers involved.

Mishandled bags per 1,000 passengers by region, 2025
Region	All flights	Domestic	International
Africa	12.1	1.8	15.0
Europe	10.5	3.8	12.7
North America	5.6	2.0	11.6
Middle East	5.0	2.7	5.3
Asia-Pacific	3.41	0.8	5.3
World	4.9	1.65	9.12

Source: SITA Baggage IT Insights 2026.

The European rate has fallen substantially since the disruption of 2022, when it reached 15.7 mishandled bags per 1,000 passengers.

=== National reporting ===
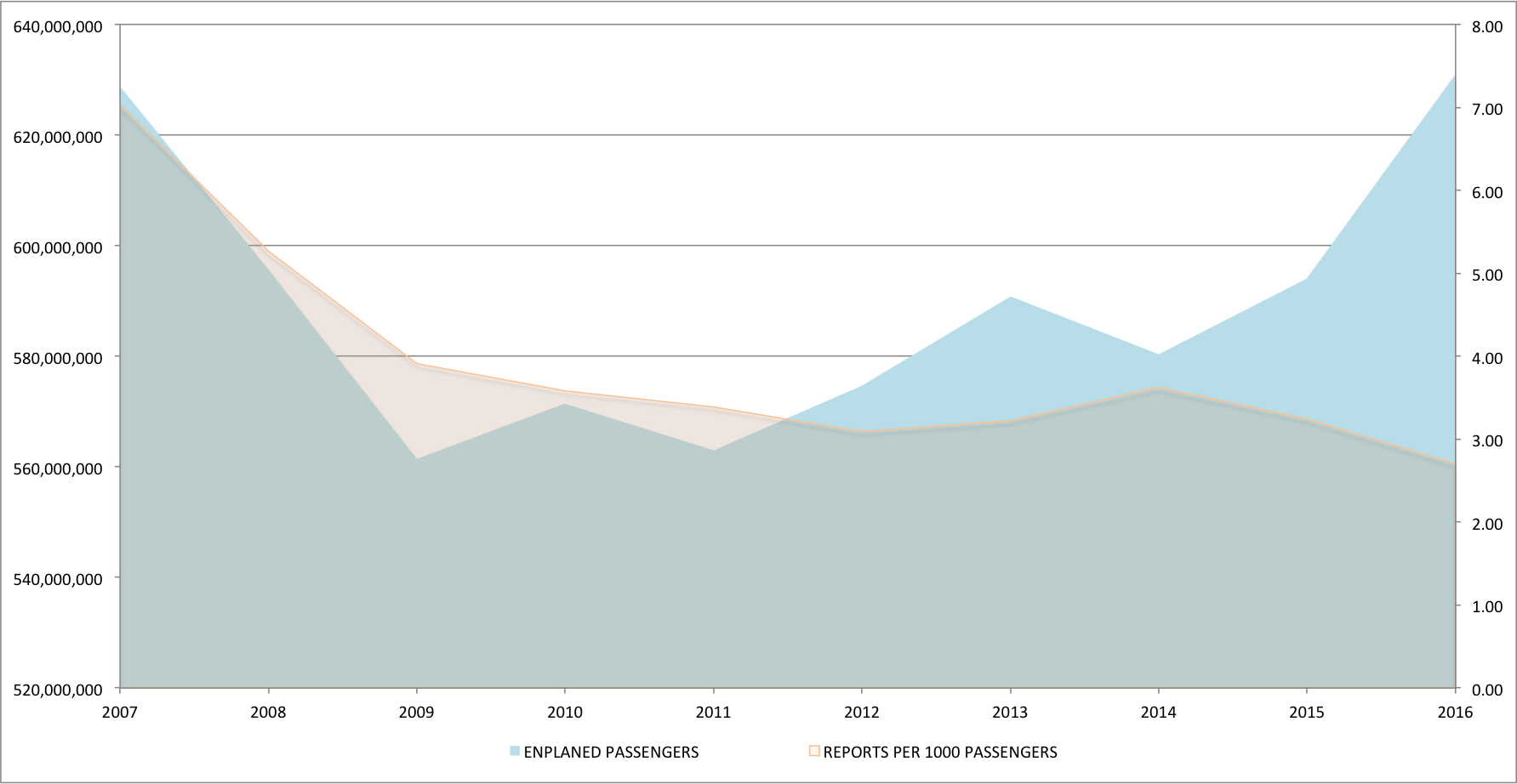
Mishandled baggage reports filed with the largest United States carriers in relation to enplaned passenger growth, 2006–2016, on the reporting basis then used

National aviation regulators publish baggage statistics on differing bases, so figures from different countries, and between national regulators and industry surveys, cannot be compared directly.

The United States Department of Transportation publishes a monthly Air Travel Consumer Report covering the largest US carriers. Its methodology has changed twice: figures for 1990 to 2018 counted passenger reports of mishandled baggage; from 2019 carriers reported the number of enplaned and mishandled bags rather than passenger reports; and since January 2022 the department has expressed the result as a percentage of enplaned bags rather than as a rate per passenger. On the current basis, US carriers mishandled 0.58 per cent of enplaned bags in the first nine months of 2024, compared with 0.62 per cent in the same period of 2023.

== Unclaimed baggage ==
Most airlines maintain stores where they sell the contents of lost or abandoned luggage. If a baggage is never recovered, it is usually because it has been mistaken by another passenger as his or her own baggage. Alternatively it could have been stolen either by another passenger or an airport employee (perhaps with an accomplice).

In 2004, a baggage handler at Baltimore-Washington International Airport was arrested for the theft of mail sent by airplane, including credit cards.

The majority of unclaimed baggage in the United States, whether by being lost or misdirected, or simply forgotten by travelers, is handled by the Unclaimed Baggage Center in Scottsboro, Alabama, which has contracts with most major airlines. Eventually, the luggage sent to the centre is resold for a profit.

== Surge following the COVID-19 pandemic ==
Airlines, airports and ground handling companies shed large numbers of staff during the COVID-19 pandemic. When demand recovered in 2022 faster than those workforces could be rebuilt, and long-haul connecting traffic resumed, baggage operations in several regions were unable to cope. SITA recorded a global mishandling rate of 7.6 bags per 1,000 passengers in 2022, an increase of 75 per cent on 2021, and attributed the deterioration to the downsizing of airlines, ground handlers and airports and to the return of international and long-haul flights with connections. Europe was the worst affected region, at 15.7 mishandled bags per 1,000 passengers.

=== Europe ===
At London Heathrow, a technical fault in the Terminal 2 baggage system on 17 June 2022 left large numbers of bags piled outside the terminal and caused some passengers to depart without their luggage; the airport apologised and said it was working with airlines to reunite passengers with their bags. On 12 July 2022 Heathrow capped departing passengers at 100,000 a day until 11 September and asked airlines to stop selling tickets for the summer. Chief executive John Holland-Kaye said that when daily departures regularly exceeded that number the consequences included "bags not travelling with passengers or arriving late", long queues, poor punctuality and last-minute cancellations. On 2 August 2022 British Airways suspended sales of short-haul tickets departing from Heathrow, saying it was acting to "maximise rebooking options for existing customers" given the restrictions imposed on it.

The scale of the backlog produced unusual operational responses. On 11 July 2022 Delta Air Lines operated an aircraft from Heathrow to Detroit carrying about 1,000 delayed checked bags and no passengers, after a scheduled service had been cancelled because of the airport's volume restrictions.

=== Australia ===
Qantas recorded some of the sharpest deterioration outside Europe. The airline's mishandled baggage rate peaked at 12 bags per 1,000 passengers in April 2022, against pre-pandemic levels of about five per 1,000 on domestic services and six on international services, and stood at nine per 1,000 in August 2022. Over the same period on-time departures fell to 52 per cent in July 2022, and cancellations reached 7.5 per cent in June against a pre-pandemic rate of 2.4 per cent. In August 2022 chief executive Alan Joyce issued a public apology for "flights delayed, flights cancelled and bags misplaced" and offered frequent flyer members flight vouchers and status extensions.

The airline's remedial measures included reducing domestic capacity, recruiting more than 1,500 staff from April 2022, a 25 per cent increase in the workforces of its ground handling suppliers, the installation of more than 120 self-service kiosks, and an increase in the minimum international-to-domestic connection time at Sydney and Melbourne airports from 60 to 90 minutes. In August 2022 Qantas also asked about 100 senior managers to volunteer for three-month rosters sorting, scanning and transporting bags at Sydney and Melbourne airports in support of its ground handling contractors. By the first half of September 2022 the mishandling rate had returned to about five per 1,000 on domestic services and six on international services.

In 2020 Qantas had outsourced its ground handling and cleaning operations at ten Australian airports, affecting about 1,800 workers. The High Court of Australia unanimously held in September 2023 that the decision contravened the Fair Work Act 2009, and the Federal Court of Australia imposed a A$90 million penalty in August 2025. The Transport Workers' Union and commentators linked the 2022 baggage failures to the loss of that experienced workforce; Qantas attributed the disruption to labour shortages, elevated crew sick leave and the speed of the industry's restart.

=== Return to pre-pandemic levels ===
Global performance improved from 2023 onwards, the rate falling to 6.9 mishandled bags per 1,000 passengers in 2023, 6.3 in 2024 and 4.9 in 2025, by which point SITA reported that mishandling was below pre-pandemic levels. SITA attributed the recovery to investment in automation, computer vision, radio-frequency identification, data sharing between airlines and airports, and passenger-shared bag tracking.

== See also ==
- Baggage handling system
- Okoban
- WorldTracer
