= Christine Negroni =

American aviation and travel writer

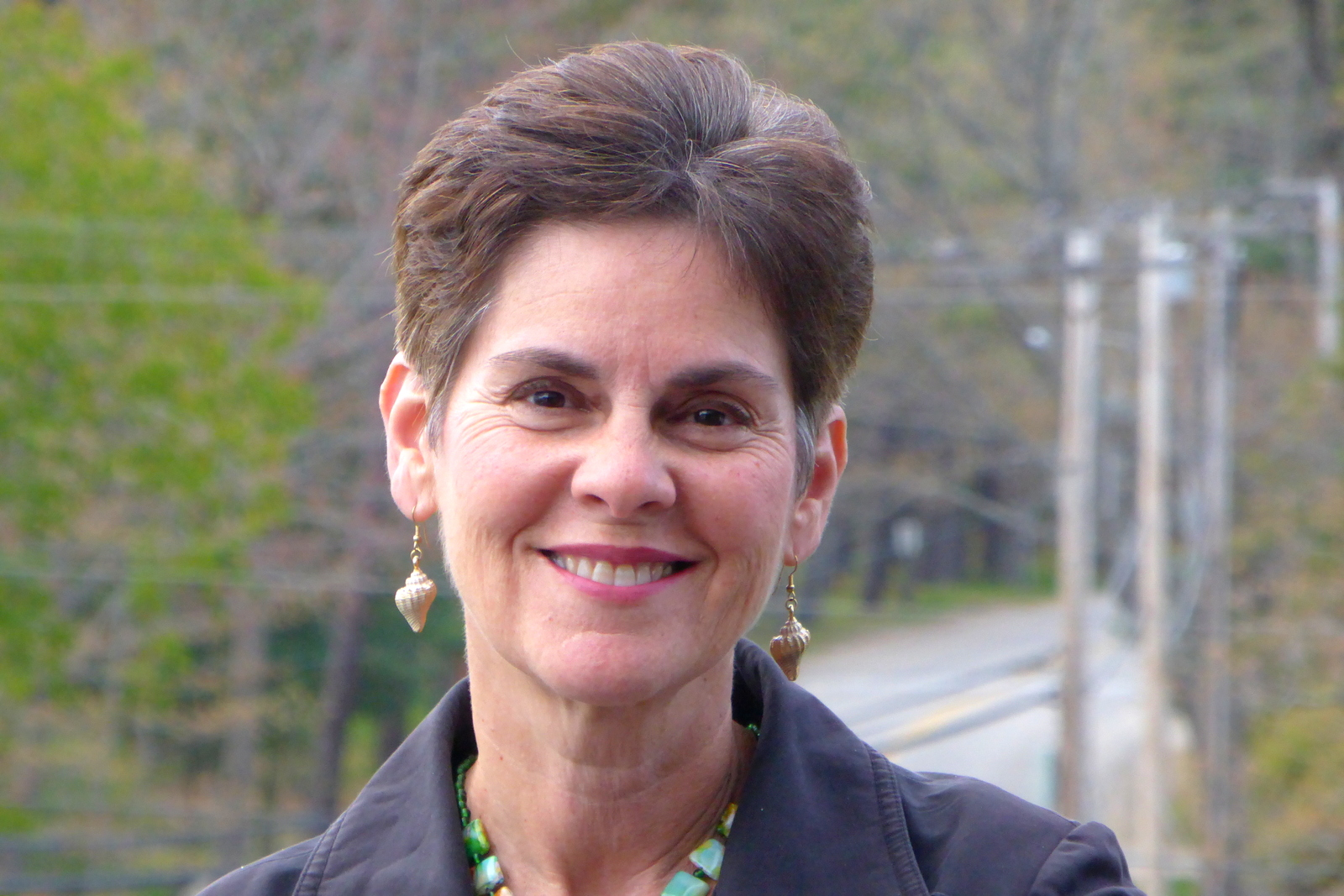
- Born: Lorie Christine Negroni; December 19, 1956 (age 68); Miami, Florida, U.S.
- Occupations: Aviation and travel writer
- Years active: 1978–present
- Spouse: James Schembari
- Website: christinenegroni.com

Christine Negroni (born December 19, 1956) is an American aviation and travel writer whose work appears in The New York Times, The Washington Post, Seattle Post-Intelligencer, Fortune, and other publications. She is the author of two books, Deadly Departure (2000) and The Crash Detectives: Investigating The World's Most Mysterious Air Disasters (2016).

She is an on-camera contributor for ABC News and writes the aviation-themed blog Flying Lessons.

== Career ==
=== Broadcast journalism ===
Negroni began her journalism career in 1978. She worked as an on-camera broadcast journalist for WMAZ Macon, Georgia and KSLA Shreveport, Louisiana, New Jersey Nightly News in Newark and Trenton, New Jersey, WFSB in Hartford, Connecticut, WGN in Chicago. She worked for CNN in New York from 1993-1999. She has been the recipient of awards from the National Academy of Television Arts & Sciences (Emmy nomination), Society of Professional Journalists Sigma Delta Chi and Associated Press.

=== CBS News ===
From 1988 to 1991 Negroni was a correspondent at the CBS bureaus in Atlanta, New York and Chicago. Her stories appeared on the CBS Evening News with Dan Rather. She was a contributor to the award-winning program Sunday Morning with Charles Kuralt. In 1990 she received the National Association of Hispanic Journalists Excellence Award. She was honored by the National Air Disaster Alliance & Foundation for journalism in 2010.

=== CNN ===
In 1993 Negroni became a New York-based correspondent for CNN, creating the network's aviation beat where she reported exclusives in travel and aviation news.

=== Deadly Departure ===
In 2000 HarperCollins published Negroni's book, Deadly Departure: Why The Experts Failed To Prevent The TWA Flight 800 Disaster And How It Could Happen Again. The New York Times called it a “well-written, well-researched chronicle of events surrounding the crash of Flight 800.” It was a New York Times Book of the Year in 2000.

=== Kreindler & Kreindler ===
From 2001 to 2008, Negroni was the Director of Investigations for New York aviation law firm, Kreindler & Kreindler. There she was responsible for coordinating the factual elements for a civil suit against financial sponsors of the September 11th attacks. She also examined liability issues arising from commercial and private airplane accidents.

=== Aviation Industry achievements ===
Negroni represented the flying public as a voting member of a Federal Aviation Administration rulemaking advisory committee on aging aircraft systems from 2000 to 2005. In 2009 she was on the President's short list for a nomination to the National Transportation Safety Board. She is a member of the International Society of Air Safety Investigators where she has presented papers on the overuse of emergency helicopter ambulances in the United States, airline flags of convenience as a global security and safety issue and assessing the effectiveness of human factors in aviation safety.

The International Air Transport Association has invited Negroni to present at industry conferences on airport ground handling safety (Vancouver 2007) and crisis communications (Istanbul 2014).

=== Travel writing ===
Since 2003, Negroni has contributed to newspapers, magazines, online and broadcast publications, writing about experiential travel, transportation, and aviation. Select publications include The New York Times, the Washington Post, Chicago Tribune, Macleans, Seattle PI, Air & Space, WAG Wanders, RunwayGirlNetwork and Travel + Leisure.

Negroni is an aviation safety specialist for ABC News. She regularly appears as a guest aviation and travel expert for television documentaries.

== Personal life ==
Negroni was born on December 19, 1956, in Miami, Florida, the daughter of Jaime Negroni and Dione Negroni Hendrick.

She is married to Jim Schembari, an editor at The New York Times. They have four children.

== Bibliography ==
=== Books ===
- Deadly Departure: Why The Experts Failed To Prevent The TWA Flight 800 Disaster And How It Could Happen Again HarperCollins (2000)
- The Crash Detectives: Investigating the World's Most Mysterious Air Disasters Penguin Books (2016)

=== Publications ===
- Less Baggage, Big Savings to Airlines - The New York Times
- Drawing Yourself Into the Scene - The New York Times
- In India, Jewels a Maharani or Grandmother Could Love - The New York Times
- Quite a View From the Trolley - Go How Know How
- Wild things on Florida's nature trail - Connecticut Post
- Hot Chick Fast Car Young Driver Thrilling Ride at Lamborghini - The Huffington Post
- Kyoto's Geisha Real or Imagined, Still Captivating - The Huffington Post

=== Speaking engagements ===
- 2014 - Presenter - IATA Crisis Communications Seminar Istanbul
- 2014 - Guest Lecturer - International Space University Montreal 2014
- 2014 - Guest Triple M Radio Sydney, Australia
- 2014 - On Camera Contributor - ABC News New York
- 2013 - On Camera Contributor - National Geographic New York
- 2011 - Guest Lecturer - Florida Institute of Technology
- 2011 - On Camera Contributor - Discovery Channel Air Crash Investigations
- 2010 - Speaker - Some Like it Hot Why and how aviation professionals should handle the media when a crisis erupts. Aviation and Ash Conference Reykjavik Iceland
- 2010 - Speaker - Massachusetts Institute of Technology October
- 2010 - Speaker - Analysis of Helicopter Ambulance Accidents International Society of Air Safety Investigators Orlando
