= Okoban =

Personal property identification code system

- Type: Lost & Found system
- Industry: Travel security / lost & found
- Founded: 2009; 17 years ago
- Headquarters: Geneva, Switzerland
- Area served: Worldwide (224 countries)
- Services: Registration of unique ID codes for lost items
- Website: okoban.com

Okoban is a system that allows individuals to register property with pre-assigned unique identification codes in an online database so that, if the property is lost then found, the finder can notify the registrant. Okoban labels can be attached to luggage, passports, phones, and other objects.

Okoban manages its tracking system on behalf of the companies and agencies who use it, including luggage manufacturers, airlines and the TSA. It neither makes nor sells products directly and is provided to end users at no charge.

== History ==
Okoban first emerged as a spin-off of Travel Sentry, a company that sets standards for luggage locks.

The first products based on the Okoban standard were produced in 2009 by Sunco Luggage of Japan. These included luggage and travel accessories with Okoban codes.

Okoban logo

The name Okoban is based on the Japanese system of Kōbans, or small local police stations, which are the central place for reporting lost items or turning in found items in Japan. In the Japanese language the letter "O" preceding a word is a sign of respect; synonymous with "honourable".

== Standard and use ==
Okoban UID

The Okoban standard includes three elements:

1. the diamond mark
2. the Unique identifier (UID) code, composed of twelve alpha-numeric characters;
3. a notice to the finder, directing the finder to Okoban's website.

Okoban issues unique identifier (UID) codes to manufacturers of luggage and other products used in travel such as personal electronics. These codes are added to products at the time of production or can be added by the user to personal items using adhesive labels.

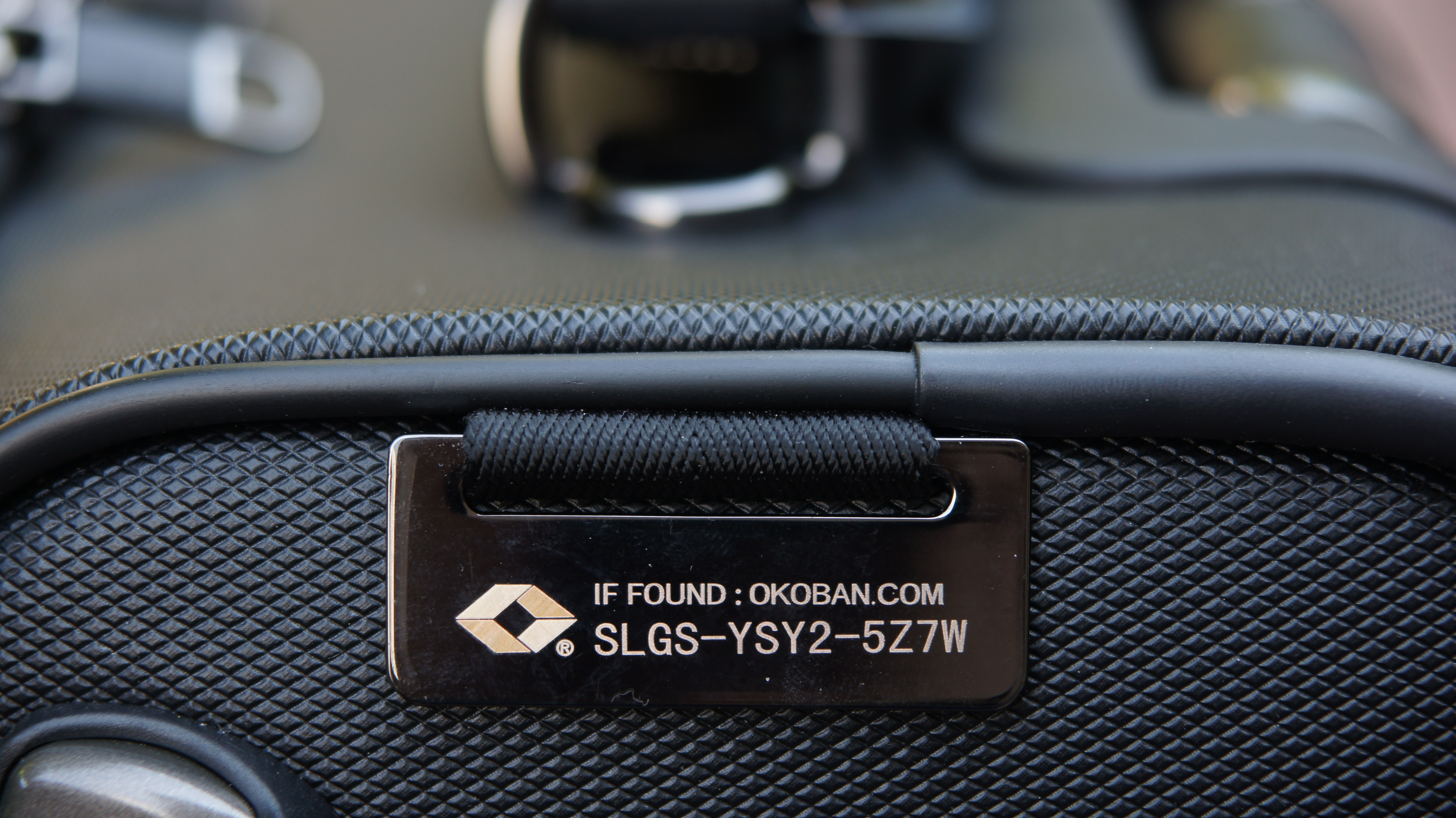
Okoban UID engraved on luggage

If an item is misplaced or lost, and then found, the finder can enter its UID into the Okoban system. The owner then receives an alert message, either via e-mail or SMS text message. The user then contacts the finder directly to arrange recovery.

The Okoban system is also integrated into WorldTracer, the central lost and found system used by airlines. It is used by over 400 airlines, airport companies and baggage handlers.

Global Airline Standard

== See also ==
- Lost luggage
