= ETIR =

Digital customs trade initiative of the United Nations

eTIR is the computerized version of the TIR procedure developed and governed by the United Nations Economic Commission for Europe (UNECE). It provides a digital equivalent to the paper TIR process by enabling secure exchanges of data between national customs systems and the management of data on guarantees.

== Background ==
The TIR Convention establishes a conventional system that allows goods to move between countries with customs checks only done at the place of departure and the place of arrival. Under the analog process, transport operators would carry a piece of paper, the TIR carnet, that served as proof of an international guarantee for duties and taxes. By the 2000s, the popularity of electronic customs processing made the paper document increasingly difficult to work with.

== History ==
The eTIR project was launched in 2003 by the Contracting Parties to the TIR Convention in order to modernize the paper-based process that had been used since the TIR Convention's inception in 1959. Bilateral pilots started as early as 2015 and a broader pilot program was started in 2017 objective to improve the efficiency and quality of the TIR procedures, reduce fraud, and improve security. In 2020, the Contracting Parties adopted Annex 11 to provide a legal basis for the data exchange and hosting requirements for the eTIR system. The eTIR procedure relies on a central platform, the eTIR international system, which ensures, inter alia, the secure exchange of data between national customs systems and allows customs to manage the data on guarantees

== Architecture ==
The eTIR system operates around three guiding principles: Information Security, High reliability and quality, and Ease of connectivity for the eTIR stakeholders. It consists of the interconnection between information systems for each actor of the eTIR procedure, including customs authorities, holders, guarantee chains, and ECE.

The eTIR procedure is the computerised equivalent of the paper TIR procedure, covering all processes over the TIR Carnet life cycle. The paper TIR Carnet is replaced by exchanges of electronic messages via the eTIR international system (a central data exchange platform), from which all actors can access and exchange relevant transit information. Customs officers receive cargo information electronically before the cargo arrives, making international freight transport faster, more efficient, and more secure.

== Implementation ==
In 2015, UNECE and the International Road Union signed a Memorandum of Understanding to initiate a pilot project between Turkey and Iran for the eTIR system. In 2016, Georgia and Turkey proposed a pilot to enable customs-to-customs data exchange. The eTIR project was implemented in 2021 following the adoption of Annex 11 in 2020, which provided the legal basis for UNECE to host the eTIR system. Further pilot projects were completed between Iran and India in 2022.

== The International TIR Data Bank (ITDB) ==
The International TIR Data Bank (ITDB) is the central reference repository system for TIR-related customs data, underpinning the controlled access pillar of the TIR Convention.

=== Overview and mandate ===
The ITDB was introduced by the UNECE TIR secretariat in 1999, in accordance with the Terms of Reference of the TIR Executive Board (TIRExB). It was created in line with Annex 9, Part II of the TIR Convention. The ITDB is a mandatory technical solution mandated to enable the controlled and secure execution of TIR and eTIR procedures.

The main goal of the ITDB is to foster the exchange of information between competent authorities of Contracting Parties and national associations. The ITDB is the official registry of transport operators authorized by customs authorities.

The ITDB and its web application (ITDBonline+) allow customs administrations and national associations to collaboratively manage the authorisation process for TIR Carnet holders. In accordance with section 1.9.1 of the TIR Handbook and Article 13 of Annex 11 to the TIR Convention, Governments are required to provide and maintain the list of authorised TIR Carnet holders, customs offices capable of accomplishing eTIR procedures, and their customs stamps and sealings.

=== Role in the eTIR system ===
Within the broader eTIR architecture, the ITDB plays a critical role: it enables the automatic checking of the validity of guarantees and the authorisation status of TIR Carnet holders during electronic transit procedures. It forms part of the integrated eTIR infrastructure alongside the eTIR web services and the broader guarantee management system
