= Kreindler & Kreindler =

American law firm

Kreindler & Kreindler LLP is a U.S. law firm founded in 1950 with offices in New York, California and Massachusetts. The firm specializes in air disaster litigation and has represented plaintiffs in most major aviation disaster litigations. According to the New York Times, Lee Kreindler, a named partner of the firm, was "considered the founder of air disaster law."

Firm practice areas also include the September 11th Victim Compensation Fund, maritime and general torts, business litigation matters and class-action securities cases. In the non-aviation area, the firm is currently representing former professional football players in the NFL concussion litigation, plaintiffs in the Fresenius dialysis drug litigation, victims of the BP oil spill, plaintiffs in the Toyota class-action and also plaintiffs in various major securities cases, including the AIG and Countrywide litigations.

== Notable litigation ==
=== Pan Am Flight 103 ===
Aviation lawyers at Kreindler & Kreindler LLP represented victim families from the 1988 Lockerbie disaster. They won liability and damages verdicts in cases against Pan American World Airways on the basis that the airline was guilty of 'wilful misconduct' for allowing a bomb to be smuggled on board their aircraft. The litigation against Pan American was a close call, after winning the trial, the firm won the defendants appeal to the Second Circuit on a 2–1 vote. In 1996, the firm sued Libya for sponsoring the terrorist attack and later settled the case against Libya for 2.7 billion dollars. James Kreindler and other lawyers from the firm won the Public Justice 2009 Lawyer of the Year award for their work on the case.

=== TWA 800 ===
The firm represented victims from the TWA 800 disaster and Lee Kreindler (d. 2003) was one of the first to claim that the disaster was caused by mechanical problem, and not a missile or bomb. He argued that vital safety checks were not enforced, saying; "The mandate requires a full engine survey. This one was re-certified immediately, without a survey. It was stamped and approved in a day." Mr. Kreindler was appointed to chair the plaintiffs committee charged with prosecuting the action and the firm, along with other members of the committee, successfully prosecuted the action. The action gave rise to a notable ruling when the Second Circuit Court of Appeals found that the crash had not occurred on the "high seas" as that term is defined in the law and that therefore the restrictive Death on the High Seas Act did not limit plaintiffs' damages. TWA 800 ultimately caused Congress to modify the Death on the High Seas Act to provide for non-economic damages.

=== Swissair 111 ===
The firm represented victims from the Swissair 111 disaster and Lee Kreindler was appointed as chair of the plaintiffs' committee. The cases were consolidated in the Eastern District of Pennsylvania and assigned to Chief Judge Giles, who oversaw the litigation and mediated the cases. Swissair ultimately settled, offering compensation in a move described by news sources such as the BBC as 'unprecedented'.

=== 9/11 ===
The firm represented many of the 9/11 victims, both in the victims' compensation fund and in litigation against the security companies and airlines. The firm took a leading role in challenging, unsuccessfully, what it claimed was a de facto cap on payments in the VCF, based on the regulations and comments made by VCF Special Master Kenneth Feinberg. The firm also brought litigation against the terrorists and individuals and entities it claimed were terrorist sponsors. This included a lawsuit for several billion dollars against Iraq, based on an allegation that Iraqi officials were aware of plans to attack America.

=== Continental Connection Flight 3407 ===
Attorneys at Kreindler and Kreindler LLP continue to represent families of victims of the 2009 crash of Buffalo-bound Colgan Air Flight 3407 (marketed as Continental Connection). The crash, which killed 50 people, was the most recent fatal accident of a commercial airliner in the U.S. until the crash of Asiana Airlines Flight 214 on July 6, 2013 in San Francisco. The disaster raised significant issues regarding commuter airline safety and has resulted in the FAA proposing or implementing several rule changes. Complicating the litigation surrounding the 2009 crash is the April 2012 bankruptcy filing by Colgan Air's parent company Pinnacle Airlines Corporation. The presiding judge, Chief U.S. District Judge William M. Skretny set a March 2014 trial date for the approximately 15 suits still pending as a result of the crash.

=== Asiana Flight 214 ===
The firm is representing multiple victims of the July 6, 2013 crash of Asiana Airlines Flight 214 at San Francisco International Airport (SFO). Aviation attorneys at the firm are handling the cases of all three Chinese teenagers who died, as well as 12 injury cases involving U.S., Chinese and Korean residents. 16-year-old injured passenger Ye Mengyuan was run over and killed by one of the San Francisco Fire Department trucks during the emergency response. Video shot by the San Francisco Fire Department at the scene later revealed that the Chinese student was in plain view and located by several firefighters before being accidentally covered in firefighting foam and later run over twice, by two different emergency vehicles. On January 10, 2014, it was announced that Kreindler & Kreindler would be filing a lawsuit on behalf of Ye Mengyuan's family against the city of San Francisco. Because litigation arising from international aviation accidents is governed by the Montreal Convention, lawyers at the firm will be determining the most appropriate venue for the filing of lawsuits for other passengers on the flight.

== See also ==
- Montreal Convention
- Warsaw Convention
- Lockerbie
- TWA Flight 800
- Swissair Flight 111
- American Airlines Flight 587
