= Montreal Convention =

Multilateral treaty adopted by the ICAO

Convention for the Unification of Certain Rules for International Carriage by Air
- Signed: 28 May 1999
- Location: Montreal, Quebec, Canada
- Effective: 4 November 2003
- Parties: 145 (144 states + EU)
- Depositary: International Civil Aviation Organization
- Languages: English, Arabic, Chinese, French, Russian and Spanish

The Montreal Convention (formally, the Convention for the Unification of Certain Rules for International Carriage by Air) is a multilateral treaty adopted on 28 May 1999 by member states of the International Civil Aviation Organization (ICAO) and entered into force on 4 November 2003. It updated and replaced parts of the earlier Warsaw Convention and Hague Protocol, which had governed international air travel since the early 20th century. The treaty aims to create clearer and more consistent rules for the international transport of passengers, baggage and cargo, especially regarding airline liability in the event of injury or death. As of October 2026, 144 of the 193 ICAO member states had joined the Convention.

A key feature of the Montreal Convention is a two-tier system for passenger compensation. Airlines are automatically responsible for proven damages up to 128,821 special drawing rights (SDR), equivalent to approximately US$175,000, without the need for passengers or their families to prove fault. For claims above that amount, the airline is only exempt from further liability if it can show that the incident was not caused by its own negligence. This system replaced the older, more limited compensation rules and was designed to simplify legal proceedings for victims and their families.

== Damages ==
Under the Montreal Convention, air carriers are strictly liable for proven damages up to 128,821 special drawing rights (SDR), a mix of currency values established by the International Monetary Fund, equivalent to approximately US$175,000. For claims exceeding this amount, carriers can avoid liability only by proving that the accident was not due to their negligence or was solely caused by a third party. This defense is not available for claims within the 128,821 SDR limit. The convention also amended the jurisdictional provisions of the Warsaw Convention, allowing victims or their families to bring claims in the country of their principal residence, and requires all air carriers to maintain liability insurance.

== Lost baggage ==
The Montreal Convention increased the maximum liability of airlines for lost, damaged, or delayed baggage to 1,519 SDR per passenger. Under the earlier Warsaw Convention, compensation was calculated based on the weight of the baggage. The Montreal Convention also requires airlines to reimburse passengers for the cost of essential replacement items purchased while baggage is delayed, up to the same 1,519 SDR limit. Baggage that remains undelivered after 21 days is considered lost unless recovered and returned by the airline.

== Ratifications ==
As October 2026, there are 145 parties to the convention. Included in this total is 144 of the 193 ICAO Member States plus the European Union. The states that have ratified represent 143 UN member states plus the Cook Islands.

Member state	Date of entry into force	Notes
Afghanistan	-	Warsaw Convention & Hague Protocol
Albania	19 December 2004	
Algeria	-	Warsaw Convention & Hague Protocol
Andorra	28 June 2004	
Angola	22 November 2025	
Antigua and Barbuda	-	None International Protocol
Argentina	14 February 2010	
Armenia	15 June 2010	
Australia	24 January 2009	
Austria	28 June 2004	
Azerbaijan	11 April 2015	
Bahamas	-	Signed. Not ratified
Bahrain	4 November 2003	
Bangladesh	1 November 2022	
Barbados	4 November 2003	
Belarus	-	Warsaw Convention & Hague Protocol
Belgium	28 June 2004	
Belize	4 November 2003	
Benin	29 May 2004	
Bhutan	-	None International Protocol
Bolivia	5 July 2015	
Bosnia and Herzegovina	8 May 2007	
Botswana	4 November 2003	
Brazil	18 July 2006	
Brunei	17 May 2020	
Bulgaria	9 January 2004	
Burkina Faso	25 August 2013	
Burundi	-	None International Protocol
Cambodia	1 April 2025	
Cameroon	4 November 2003	
Canada	4 November 2003	
Cape Verde	22 October 2004	
Central African Republic	-	Signed. Not ratified
Chad	10 September 2017	
Chile	18 May 2009	
China	31 July 2005	Entry into force for Hong Kong: 15 December 2006
Colombia	4 November 2003	
Comoros	-	Warsaw Convention
Republic of the Congo	17 February 2012	
Costa Rica	8 August 2011	
Croatia	23 March 2008	
Cuba	13 December 2005	
Cyprus	4 November 2003	
Czech Republic	4 November 2003	
Democratic Republic of the Congo	19 September 2014	
Denmark	28 June 2004	Does not apply to the Faroe Islands.
Djibouti	-	None International Protocol
Dominica	-	Warsaw Convention & Hague Protocol
Dominican Republic	20 November 2007	
Ecuador	26 August 2006	
Egypt	25 April 2005	
El Salvador	6 January 2008	
Equatorial Guinea	17 November 2015	
Eritrea	-	None International Protocol
Estonia	4 November 2003	
Eswatini	22 January 2017	
Ethiopia	22 June 2014	
Fiji	9 January 2016	
Finland	28 June 2004	
France	28 June 2004	
Gabon	5 April 2014	
Gambia	9 May 2004	
Georgia	18 February 2011	
Germany	28 June 2004	
Ghana	3 August 2018	
Greece	4 November 2003	
Grenada	7 August 2026	
Guatemala	6 August 2016	
Guinea	-	Warsaw Convention & Hague Protocol
Guinea-Bissau	-	None International Protocol
Guyana	21 February 2015	
Haiti	-	None International Protocol
Honduras	16 January 2016	
Hungary	7 January 2005	
Iceland	16 August 2004	
India	30 June 2009	
Indonesia	19 May 2017	
Iran	-	Warsaw Convention & Hague Protocol
Iraq	-	Warsaw Convention & Hague Protocol
Ireland	28 June 2004	
Israel	20 March 2011	
Italy	28 June 2004	
Ivory Coast	5 April 2015	
Jamaica	5 September 2009	
Japan	4 November 2003	
Jordan	4 November 2003	
Kazakhstan	31 August 2015	
Kenya	4 November 2003	
Kiribati	-	None International Protocol
Kuwait	4 November 2003	
Kyrgyzstan	-	Warsaw Convention & Hague Protocol
Laos	-	Warsaw Convention & Hague Protocol
Latvia	15 February 2005	
Lebanon	14 May 2005	
Lesotho	-	Warsaw Convention & Hague Protocol
Liberia	-	Warsaw Convention
Libya	-	Warsaw Convention & Hague Protocol
Liechtenstein	28 June 2004	
Lithuania	29 January 2005	
Luxembourg	28 June 2004	
Madagascar	26 February 2007	
Malawi	-	Warsaw Convention & Hague Protocol
Malaysia	29 February 2008	
Maldives	30 December 2005	
Mali	16 March 2008	
Malta	4 July 2004	
Marshall Islands	-	None International Protocol
Mauritania	-	Warsaw Convention
Mauritius	3 April 2017	
Mexico	4 November 2003	
Federated States of Micronesia	-	None International Protocol
Moldova	16 May 2009	
Monaco	17 October 2004	
Mongolia	4 December 2004	
Montenegro	16 March 2010	
Morocco	14 June 2010	
Mozambique	28 March 2014	
Myanmar	-	Warsaw Convention
Namibia	4 November 2003	
Nauru	-	Warsaw Convention & Hague Protocol
Nepal	15 December 2018	
Netherlands	28 June 2004	
New Zealand	4 November 2003	
Nicaragua	5 November 2022	
Niger	1 April 2018	
Nigeria	4 November 2003	
North Macedonia	4 November 2003	
North Korea	-	Warsaw Convention & Hague Protocol
Norway	28 June 2004	
Oman	27 July 2007	
Pakistan	17 February 2007	
Palau	-	None International Protocol
Panama	4 November 2003	
Papua New Guinea	-	Warsaw Convention & Hague Protocol
Paraguay	4 November 2003	
Peru	4 November 2003	
Philippines	18 December 2015	
Poland	18 March 2006	
Portugal	4 November 2003	
Qatar	14 November 2005	
Romania	4 November 2003	
Russia	21 August 2017	
Rwanda	19 December 2015	
Saint Kitts and Nevis	-	None International Protocol
Saint Lucia	23 November 2025	
Saint Vincent and the Grenadines	28 May 2004	
Samoa	-	Warsaw Convention & Hague Protocol
San Marino	-	None International Protocol
São Tomé and Príncipe	-	None International Protocol
Saudi Arabia	14 December 2003	
Senegal	6 November 2016	
Serbia	4 April 2010	
Seychelles	12 November 2010	
Sierra Leone	24 January 2016	
Singapore	16 November 2007	
Slovakia	4 November 2003	
Slovenia	4 November 2003	
Solomon Islands	-	Warsaw Convention & Hague Protocol
Somalia	-	None International Protocol
South Africa	21 January 2007	
South Korea	29 December 2007	
South Sudan	-	None International Protocol
Spain	28 June 2004	
Sri Lanka	18 January 2019	
Sudan	17 October 2017	
Suriname	-	Warsaw Convention & Hague Protocol
Sweden	28 June 2004	
Switzerland	5 September 2005	
Syria	4 November 2003	
Tajikistan	-	None International Protocol
Tanzania	4 November 2003	
Thailand	2 October 2017	
Timor-Leste	-	None International Protocol
Togo	26 November 2016	
Tonga	19 January 2004	
Trinidad and Tobago	-	Warsaw Convention & Hague Protocol
Tunisia	20 November 2018	
Turkey	26 March 2011	
Turkmenistan	17 May 2026	
Tuvalu	-	None International Protocol
Uganda	27 January 2018	
Ukraine	5 May 2009	
United Arab Emirates	4 November 2003	
United Kingdom	28 June 2004	
United States	4 November 2003	
Uruguay	4 April 2008	
Uzbekistan	-	Warsaw Convention & Hague Protocol
Vanuatu	8 January 2006	
Venezuela	-	Warsaw Convention & Hague Protocol
Vietnam	26 November 2018	
Yemen	-	Warsaw Convention & Hague Protocol
Zambia	-	Signed. Not ratified
Zimbabwe	28 October 2024	

== Criticism ==
=== Exclusion of psychiatric injuries ===
The Montreal Convention does not provide compensation for psychiatric injury unless it is directly linked to physical injury. Article 17, which defines carrier liability for accidents, refers specifically to "bodily injury." As a result, claims for purely psychiatric harm, such as post-traumatic stress disorder without accompanying physical injury, are generally excluded from compensation. This limitation has been the subject of criticism from accident survivors, legal scholars, and affected families.

The issue gained public attention in Australia following the case of Karen Casey, a nurse who experienced psychological trauma after the medical evacuation flight she was attending crashed off Norfolk Island. Australia had amended its laws to align with the Montreal Convention’s terminology, replacing references to "personal injury" with "bodily injury" under the Civil Aviation (Carriers' Liability) Act to ensure consistency with the treaty regarding international flights. However, the amendment also precludes claims for mental injuries unless accompanied by additional physical or property damage. The case and the broader issue were featured in a March 2015 episode of the investigative program Four Corners, which examined concerns about the exclusion of psychiatric injury from compensation claims.

=== Mobility equipment for disabled passengers ===
The liability limit of 1,288 SDR for lost, damaged, or delayed baggage also applies to mobility equipment such as wheelchairs, which can present challenges for passengers with disabilities. The value of such equipment often exceeds the compensation cap, and its loss or damage can have a much greater impact on passengers with disabilities than on others losing standard baggage.

The European Commission acknowledged this issue in a communication regarding the liability of air carriers and airports for destroyed, damaged, or lost mobility equipment, issued in connection with Regulation (EC) No 1107/2006 on the rights of disabled persons and persons with reduced mobility when traveling by air. The report noted that, unlike the European Union, jurisdictions such as the United States and Canada require airlines to fully compensate passengers for damage to mobility equipment as a condition for operating in their airspace. The Commission stated that the EU may consider similar measures if existing regulations prove insufficient.

== See also ==
- Aviation law
- CMR convention
- Kenneth Beaumont
