= Kōban =

Japanese neighborhood police station

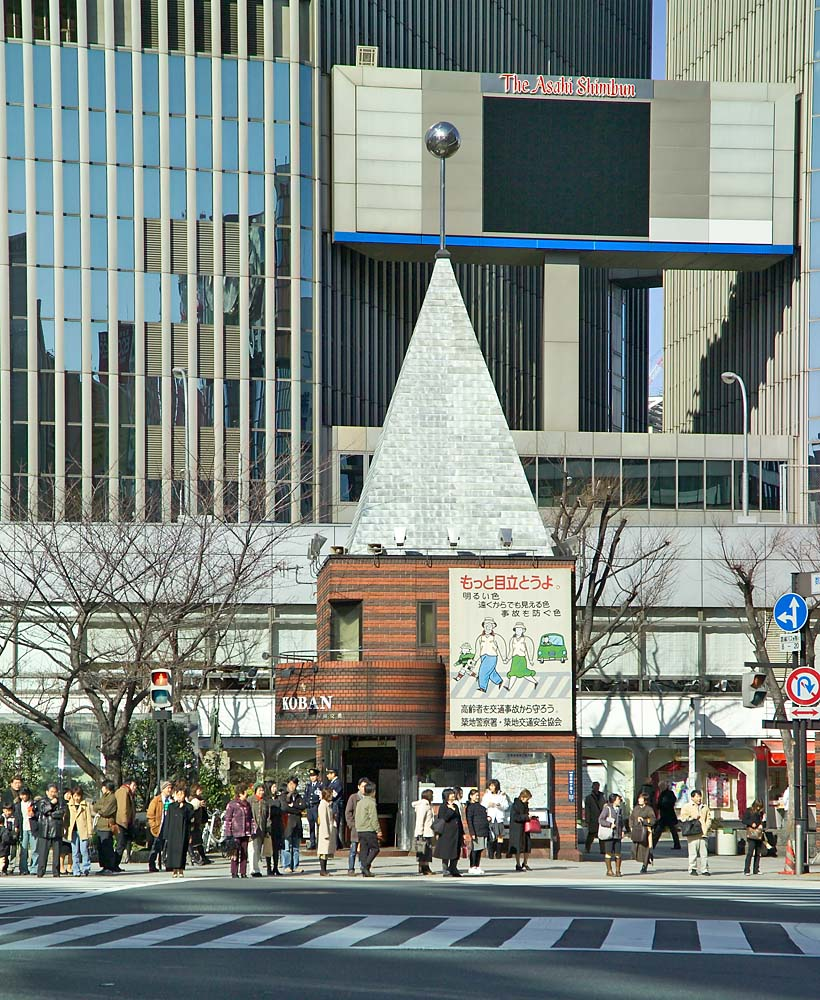
A kōban in the Ginza district of Tokyo

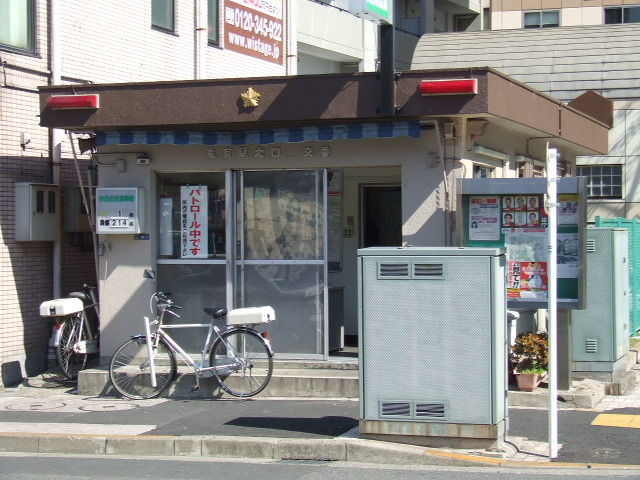
A kōban in Kameari, Katsushika, Tokyo – the model for the kōban in the manga Kochira Katsushika-ku Kameari Kōen-mae Hashutsujo

A kōban (Japanese: 交番) is a small neighborhood police station found in Japan. The term also refers to the smallest organizational unit in a modern Japanese prefectural police force. Small kōban buildings, staffed by uniformed officers at around 6,000 locations across the country, are the bases for community policing activities which complement the work of larger, central police stations. Although often translated into English as "police box", kōban bear little resemblance to the police boxes formerly found in the United Kingdom or the police call boxes formerly found in the United States, as they are larger and more permanent structures than both police boxes and call boxes.

== Overview ==
A kōban is typically a one- or two-story building with a couple of rooms (although there is wide variation), staffed by a few police officers belonging to the community police affairs section (地域課, chiiki-ka) of a police station (警察署, Keisatsu-sho). Many kōban have signs reading KOBAN in Latin script.

== Services provided ==
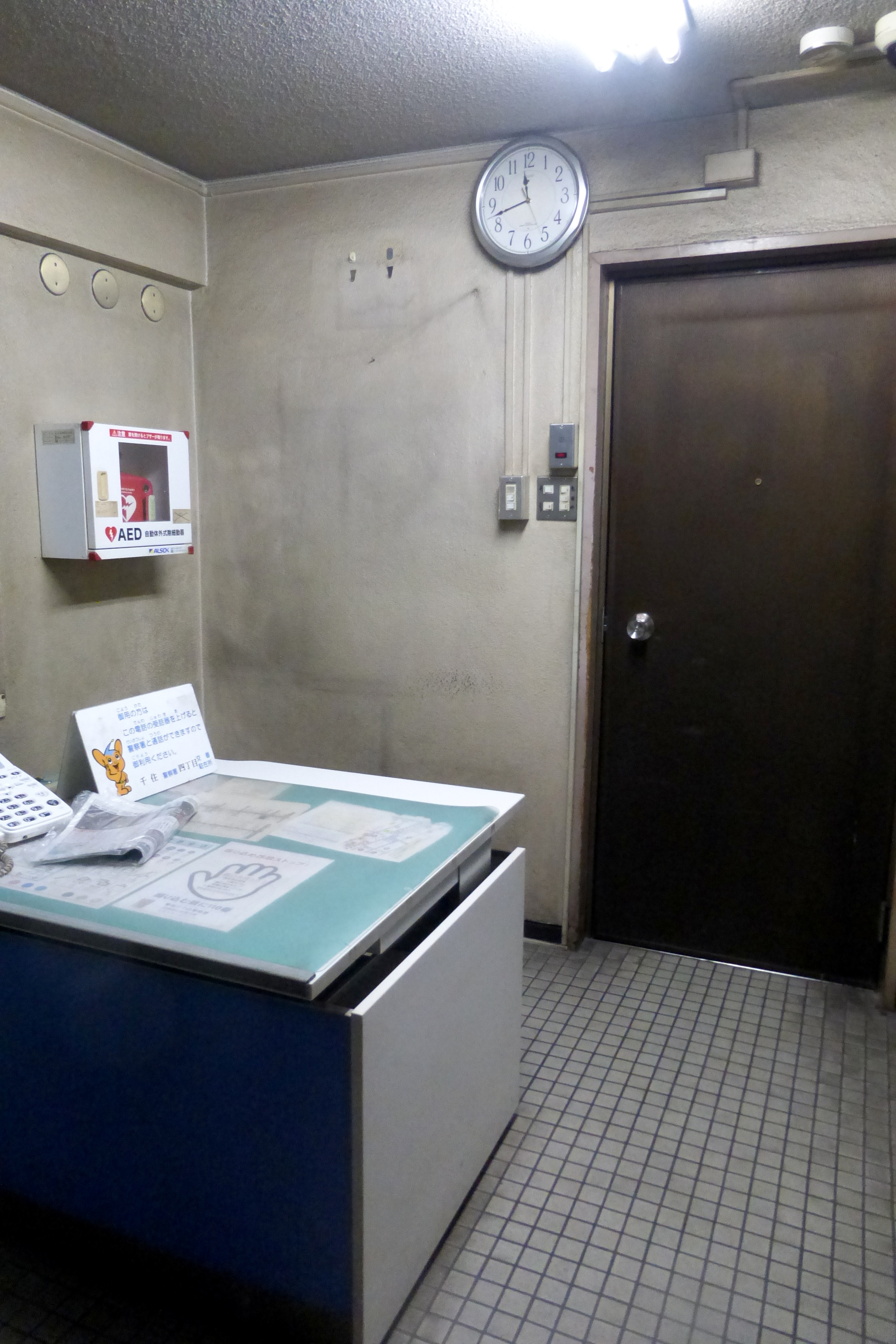
Inside a small kōban

Police officers stationed at kōban serve several roles:

- Maps and directions – providing maps and directions to local addresses. Additionally, officers can refer people to local hotels, restaurants, and other businesses.
- Lost and found – accepting reports of lost items and accepting found items from members of the public and, if a matching lost item is turned in, notifying the owner of the item to come pick up the item.
- Crime reports – taking police reports, typically for property crimes such as theft and burglary.
- Emergency services – dialing the emergency telephone number "110" in the case of emergency.

== History ==
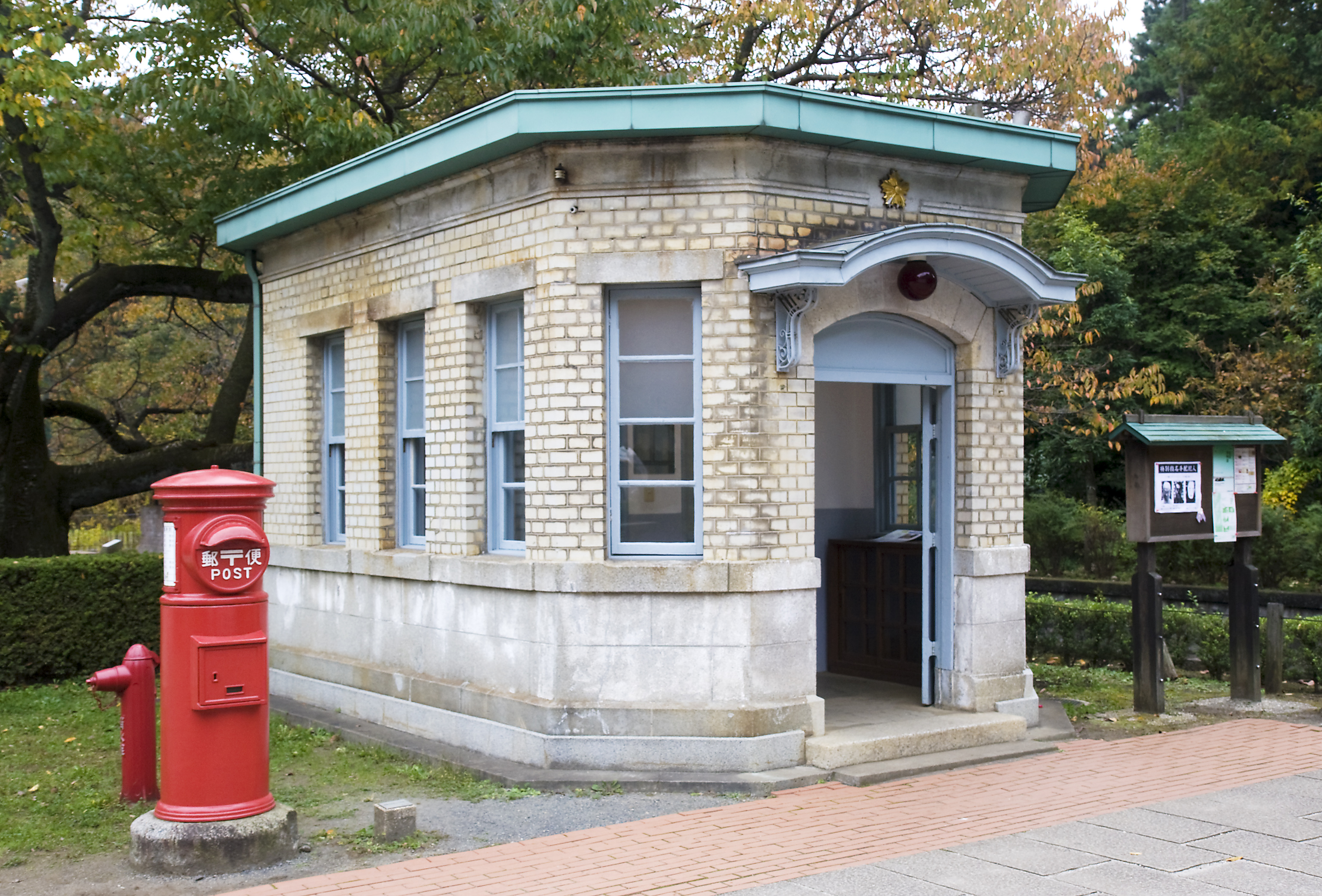
A relocated Meiji-era koban from Sudo-cho, Tokyo, today at the Edo-Tokyo Open Air Architectural Museum

The name kōban derives from the name of the earliest structure built in 1874, which were simple boxes meant for standing watch (立番, tachiban) in rotation (交替, kōtai), thus creating a compound word consisting of kō (交) and ban (番). Soon after, in 1881, kōban were transformed into local community stations with as many as six officers and a new official name hashutsujo (派出所; "local police station") was given to it — although its common name, "kōban" survived.

"Kōban" was further systematized and spread out nationwide, playing an important role in the Japanese police system over decades. In 1994, the official name hashutsujo was changed back to kōban.

In 2017, the Tokyo Metropolitan Police Department has been posting officers in kōbans who speak more than one language to help tourists and foreign expats, using the Kabukicho Kōban in Shinjuku and the Shibuya Ekimae Kōban.

In 2019, the NPA ordered a risk assessment following a series of attacks on kōban officers. In one case in 2019, a lone officer stationed inside a kōban in Suita was attacked and his sidearm stolen.

=== Other countries ===
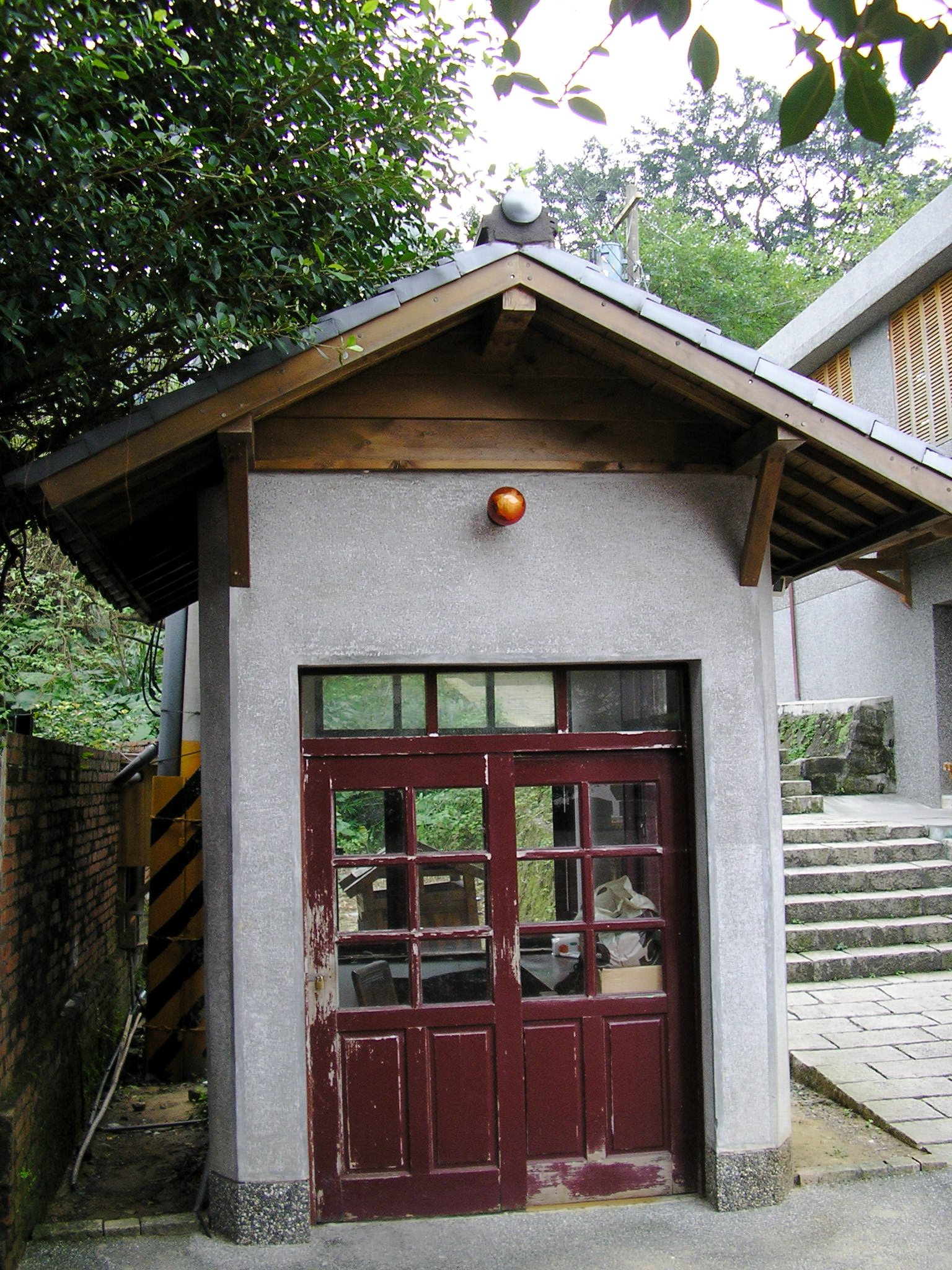
A restored Japanese colonial-era kōban in Taiwan

A system of small neighbourhood police stations based on the Japanese kōban system can also be found in Singapore, where they are known as neighbourhood police posts (NPPs). The neighbourhood police centre (NPC) system was also formed thereafter on the same neighbourhood policing system and principles, following a 1996 review of the NPP system in order to serve the Singaporean public more efficiently with consolidated manpower in each NPC.

In Myanmar, police outposts (Burmese: ရဲကင်း) function similarly to kōban in Japan. Each outpost is typically commanded by a police sergeant and staffed by three other police officers. Following the 2021 Myanmar coup d'état, more police and military outposts were set up to enhance surveillance and security. These outposts are usually located on street platforms, roadsides, near government buildings, embassies, military bases, major intersections, busy marketplaces, and other strategic urban areas.

Additionally, the kōban system has become popular with international police training and assistance programs, particularly those of the Japan International Cooperation Agency (JICA). JICA has helped to establish kōban-style community policing programs in several countries, including Indonesia, Brazil, and Honduras. In 2016, a kōban was built by the Los Angeles Police Department (LAPD) at The Grove Mall in Los Angeles, California, USA; the LAPD also operates a kōban in the Little Tokyo neighborhood.

== See also ==
- Okoban
