= Kenneth Macdonald Beaumont =

British figure skater

- Born: 10 February 1884; Blackheath, London
- Died: 24 April 1965 (aged 81); London
- Education: Oxford University
- Employer(s): British Army, IATA, ICAO
- Known for: Development of international aviation law & Philately

Major Kenneth Macdonald Beaumont CBE DSO (10 February 1884 – 24 April 1965) was a British lawyer, Air Service Corps officer, and figure skater. He made a major contribution to the development of international aviation law.

== Early life ==
Beaumont was born in Blackheath, London. He served in the Army Service Corps in the First World War, reaching the rank of Major and being awarded the Distinguished Service Order in 1918 for his services during the capture of Jerusalem.

His family motto was: "Certum pete finem" (Seek a clear objective)

== Aviation law ==
After becoming a joint partner in 1911 of the London-based legal practice, Beaumont and Son, (originally formed as a family practice by his grandfather in 1836) Major Beaumont turned the practice's focus to aviation law following an Imperial Airways accident in 1924. He was one of the three original legal advisers on the International Air Transport Association (IATA) (although it was then called the International Air Traffic Association) Legal Committee and served in this capacity from 1925 to 1946. In the early part of his career at the IATA, he was responsible for drafting the terms and conditions for passenger tickets, baggage checks and consignment notes for cargo. In 1929, Major Beaumont attended, as an observer on behalf of the IATA, a conference in Warsaw at which the Warsaw Convention for the unification of certain rules relating to international carriage by air was drafted. He was instrumental in persuading the conference members not to schedule to the Convention standard forms of tickets, baggage checks and consignment notes.

Major Beaumont was elected Chairman of the C.I.T.E.J.A. (Comité International Technique d'Experts Juridiques Aérien) – soon to become the Legal Committee of the International Civil Aviation Organization (ICAO) in 1946, of which he was also elected chairman whilst serving as its UK representative. The terms of his engagement were expressed by Lord Nathan thus:

We understand that you know more about the international aspects of air law than we do at the Ministry. In these circumstances, are you prepared to attend meetings of the C.I.T.E.J.A. on the understanding that you receive no brief or instructions from us and that, if we approve of the way in which you handle these meetings, we shall receive the credit and that, if we do not approve, your employment will be terminated?

He was elected President of the legal committee of the ICAO in 1954. Major Beaumont was the author of a draft Convention intended to replace the Warsaw Convention but although, to his regret, his draft was not adopted, many of its provisions appeared in the Hague Protocol 1955. He retired from the ICAO in 1957, but continued to attend meetings as an observer on behalf of the International Chamber of Commerce and the International Law Association.

Major Beaumont was the co-author of Shawcross and Beaumont, the standard authoritative legal text on aviation.

== Figure skating ==
As a figure skater, Beaumont competed in both the men's singles and pair skating disciplines. His pairs partner was his wife, Madelaine Beaumont. They represented Great Britain at the 1920 Summer Olympics. Beaumont placed 9th in the singles competition, and 8th in the pairs competition.

He went on to serve as a referee or judge at the World Figure Skating Championships, the European Figure Skating Championships, and the Winter Olympic Games. He served as President of the National Skating Association of Great Britain from 1956 to 1966.

== Philately ==
A philatelist specialist of the postage stamps of the United Kingdom and some of its colonies, he was president of the Royal Philatelic Society London between 1953 and 1956, of whom he was a member since 1914. He was also a member of the Fiscal Philatelic Society. He was then the founding president of the Great Britain Philatelic Society in 1955, the year he signed the Roll of Distinguished Philatelists.

== Selected publications ==
- The Postage Stamps of Great Britain, Part III. 1954. (With H.C. Adams)
