= International Road Transport Union =

Road transport

International Road Transportation Union
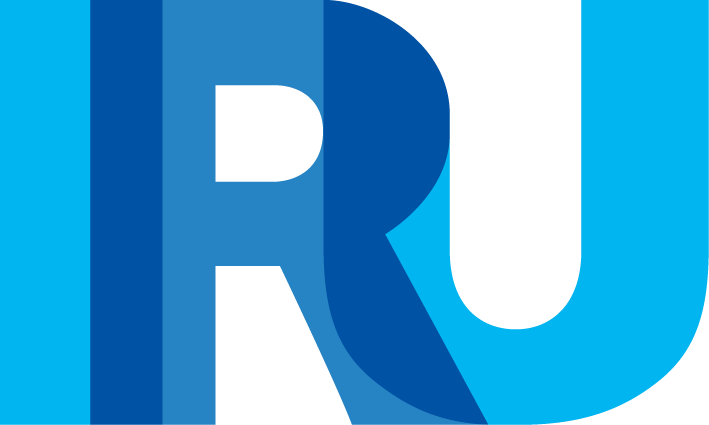
- IRU logo
- Abbreviation: IRU
- Formation: 12 March 1948; 78 years ago
- Type: NGO
- Legal status: Active
- Headquarters: La Voie-Creuse 16, 1202; Geneva, Switzerland
- Secretary General: Habib Turki
- President: Radu Dinescu
- Website: iru.org

The International Road Transport Union (IRU) is an international non-governmental organisation representing the commercial road transport industry. Headquartered in Geneva, Switzerland, it brings together national road transport associations, transport operators and other industry stakeholders involved in the movement of goods and passengers by road.

Established in 1948, IRU participates in international transport policy development, trade facilitation, customs transit, road safety, professional training and the environmental transition of road transport. It is particularly associated with the Transports Internationaux Routiers (TIR) system, an international customs transit arrangement governed by a United Nations convention.

IRU works with governments, intergovernmental organisations and industry associations. Its activities cover freight transport, logistics and passenger transport, including buses, coaches and taxis. The IRU Secretariat is led by Habib Turki since August 2026.

== History ==
=== Foundation and post-war reconstruction ===
IRU was founded in Geneva in March 1948, during the reconstruction of Europe following the Second World War. Its founding members were national road transport associations from Belgium, Denmark, France, the Netherlands, Norway, Sweden, Switzerland and the United Kingdom.

The organisation initially focused on facilitating international road transport, reducing administrative barriers at borders and representing commercial road transport operators in discussions on emerging international transport agreements.

=== Development of international transport conventions ===
During the 1950s, IRU participated in the development of international arrangements designed to harmonise cross-border road transport.

The TIR system, developed in the late 1940s, was subsequently formalised under the 1959 TIR Convention. A revised convention was adopted in 1975.

IRU also participated in international discussions surrounding other transport instruments, including the 1956 Convention on the Contract for the International Carriage of Goods by Road (CMR) and agreements concerning the international carriage of dangerous goods.

=== International expansion ===
IRU gradually expanded its geographical membership and activities beyond Europe. The extension of international road transport corridors across Eurasia, the Middle East and other regions increased the geographical scope of the TIR system and associated trade facilitation activities.

IRU subsequently expanded its work on professional transport qualifications, regulatory harmonisation, road safety and transport policy; and has opened regional offices (or delegations) in Brussels, Istanbul , Beijing and Moscow.

== Organisation and governance ==
IRU is an international federation whose members include national road transport associations and other organisations connected with the transport industry. Its governance structure includes a General Assembly and an elected Presidential Executive, chaired by the IRU President. The Secretary-General is responsible for the organisation's executive management and the work of its secretariat.

Radu Dinescu, representing Romania's National Union of Road Hauliers (UNTRR), serves as IRU President. Habib Turki became Secretary-General on 3 August 2026, succeeding Umberto de Pretto, who had held the position for 13 years. IRU's headquarters are located in Geneva, Switzerland.

== Activities ==
=== International transport policy ===
IRU represents commercial road transport interests in international discussions concerning freight transport, passenger mobility, road safety, access to markets and cross-border operations. It engages with international institutions, including the OECD's ITF, United Nations Economic Commission for Europe (UNECE), as well as regional institutions and national authorities. Its policy work addresses such matters as transport regulation, customs procedures, working conditions, professional qualifications, sustainability and the movement of goods across international borders.

=== Trade facilitation and customs transit ===
A major area of IRU's activity is the facilitation of international trade through the development and operation of customs transit arrangements.

The organisation works with customs administrations and national transport associations to support the implementation of TIR and improve the movement of goods across borders. In 2010, IRU and the United Nations Conference on Trade and Development (UNCTAD) signed a memorandum of understanding concerning cooperation between the TIR system and UNCTAD's Automated System for Customs Data (ASYCUDA).

=== TIR system ===
The TIR system is an international customs transit system allowing goods to move across participating countries under a common transit procedure and international guarantee arrangements.

The system operates under the United Nations TIR Convention of 1975, administered within the framework of UNECE.

Under authorisations granted by the TIR Administrative Committee, IRU is responsible for the organisation and functioning of the international guarantee system and for the distribution of TIR Carnets through authorised national associations.The system provides a framework for customs transit involving sealed vehicles or containers, customs controls and internationally recognised guarantees.

Although IRU performs important operational functions, the governance and supervision of the TIR Convention remain with its contracting parties and the relevant intergovernmental bodies.

=== Digitalisation and eTIR ===
IRU has participated in initiatives to computerise international customs transit and reduce reliance on paper-based procedures.

In 2017, UNECE and IRU signed a memorandum of understanding to support the computerisation of procedures under the TIR Convention.

The eTIR international system provides a framework for the electronic exchange of customs transit information among participating customs administrations and other authorised actors.

Digitalisation of TIR involves cooperation between governments, UNECE, IRU, national guaranteeing associations and transport operators.

=== Training and professional standards ===
IRU operates the IRU Academy, a professional training and certification programme delivered through a network of accredited training institutions.

Its activities concern the qualifications and professional development of commercial drivers, transport managers and other road transport professionals.

Training areas include road safety, dangerous goods transport, professional competence and transport operations.

=== Sustainability and road safety ===
IRU participates in international policy discussions on reducing the environmental impact of road transport.Its work addresses transport decarbonisation, energy efficiency, alternative fuels, vehicle technologies and the operational conditions associated with lower-emission mobility and logistics. The organisation also promotes professional training, safety standards and regulatory frameworks relating to commercial road transport.

== Cooperation with international organisations ==
IRU maintains institutional cooperation arrangements with United Nations agencies, intergovernmental organisations and international industry associations in areas including customs transit, trade facilitation, road safety, professional training and sustainable transport.

In 2010, IRU signed a memorandum of understanding with the United Nations Conference on Trade and Development (UNCTAD) to promote cooperation between the TIR system and UNCTAD's Automated System for Customs Data (ASYCUDA). In 2013, IRU signed an agreement with the World Customs Organization to strengthen cooperation on customs procedures and international trade facilitation.

IRU has also concluded cooperation agreements with several United Nations bodies. These include UN-Habitat in 2015, the United Nations Economic and Social Commission for Western Asia in 2016, and the United Nations Office of the High Representative for the Least Developed Countries, Landlocked Developing Countries and Small Island Developing States in 2016 and 2017.

Cooperation with the United Nations Economic Commission for Europe (UNECE) has included agreements signed in 2017 and 2021 concerning the digitalisation of customs transit procedures under the TIR Convention.

Beyond the United Nations system, IRU has entered into agreements with international transport and mobility organisations, including the International Road Federation in 2023 and the Fédération Internationale de l'Automobile in 2024. In 2026, IRU signed cooperation agreements with the International Transport Forum and the Gulf Petrochemicals and Chemicals Association.

Historically, IRU has also concluded cooperation agreements with regional organisations including the Eurasian Economic Community, GUAM and TRACECA.

== See also ==
- TIR Convention
- United Nations Economic Commission for Europe
- Convention on the Contract for the International Carriage of Goods by Road
- International road transport
- United Nations Conference on Trade and Development
