= TIR Convention =

1975 multilateral treaty

Convention on International Transport of Goods Under Cover of TIR Carnets
- Contracting Parties to the TIR Convention
- Signed: 14 November 1975
- Location: Geneva
- Effective: 20 March 1978
- Condition: 5 ratifications
- Signatories: 16
- Parties: 79
- Depositary: Secretary-General of the United Nations
- Languages: English, French and Russian

TIR plate

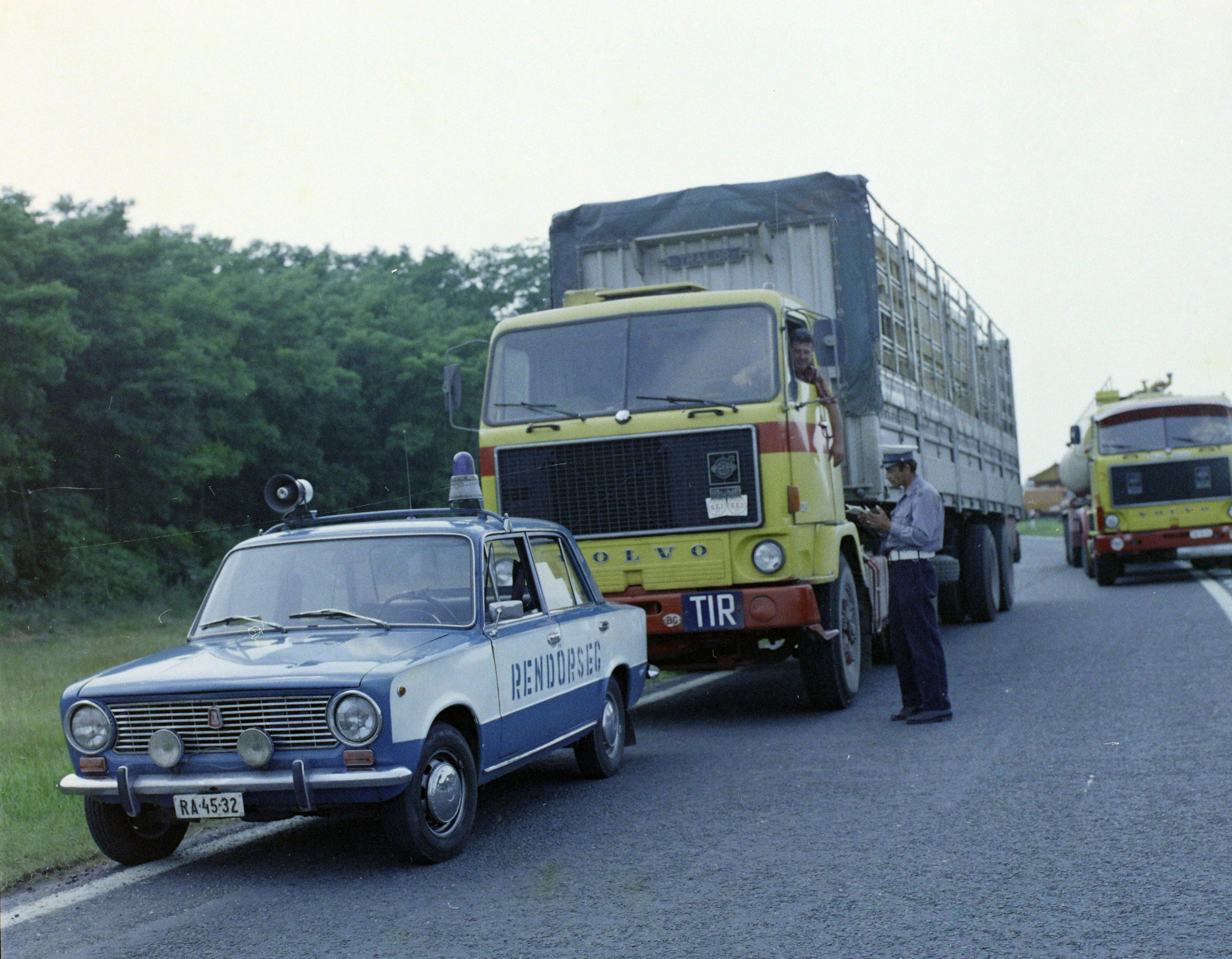
Bulgarian TIR lorry in Hungary, 1978

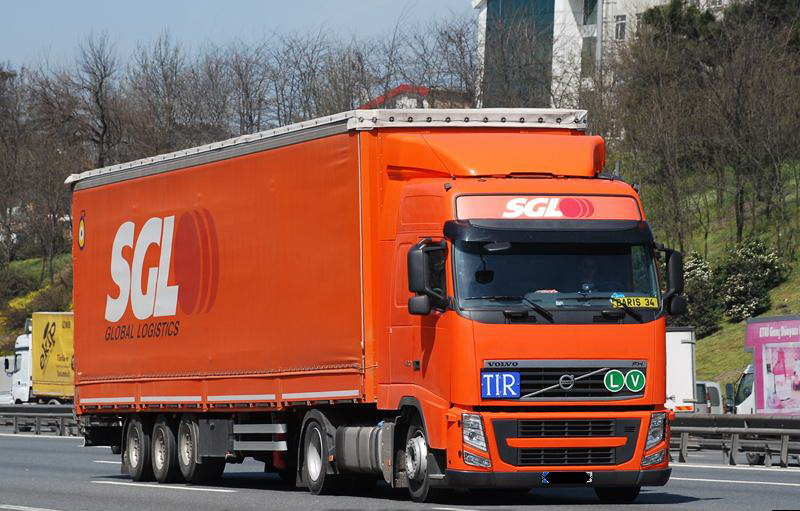
TIR lorry, 2010

The Convention on International Transport of Goods Under Cover of TIR Carnets (TIR Convention) is a multilateral treaty based on a United Nations (UN) convention and administered by the United Nations Economic Commission for Europe (UNECE). It is the oldest public-private partnership maintained by the UN.

== History ==
The treaty was concluded at Geneva on 14 November 1975 to simplify and harmonise the administrative formalities of international road transport. (TIR stands for "transit international routier" or "International Road Transport".) The 1975 convention replaced the TIR Convention of 1959, which itself replaced the 1949 TIR Agreement between a number of European countries. As of March 2023, there are 78 parties to the convention, including 77 states and the European Union.

The TIR system not only covers customs transit by road, but a combination is possible with other modes of transport (e.g., rail, inland waterway, and even maritime transport), as long as at least one part of the total transport is made by road.

To date, more than 33,000 international transport operators had been authorised (by their respective competent national authorities) to access the TIR system, using around 1.5 million TIR carnets per year.

== Scope ==
The TIR Convention establishes an international customs transit system with maximum facility to move goods:

- in sealed vehicles or containers
- from a customs office of departure in one country to a customs office of destination in another country
- without requiring extensive and time-consuming border checks at intermediate borders
- while, at the same time, providing customs authorities with the required security and guarantees

The TIR system is rooted in five pillars and relies on the use of the TIR carnet, a document that acts as secure documentation guaranteeing the security of the shipment.

The TIR system not only covers customs transit by road, but a combination is possible with other modes of transport (e.g., rail, inland waterway, and even maritime transport), as long as at least one part of the total transport is made by road.

As a result of Brexit, TIR carnets could become part of the solution to merchandise traffic between Great Britain and other European countries, or for goods to transit intra-EU, for example between Ireland and mainland Europe.

== TIR procedures ==
Hauliers making use of the TIR procedure must first obtain an internationally harmonised customs document, referred to as a TIR carnet. TIR carnets are issued by national road transport associations. This customs document is valid internationally and, as well as describing the goods, their shipper and their destination, represents a financial guarantee. When a lorry arrives at a border customs post, it need not pay import duties and taxes on goods at that time. Instead, the payments are suspended. If the vehicle transits the country without delivering any goods, no taxes are due. If it fails to leave the country with all the goods, then the taxes are billed to the importer and the financial guarantee backstops the importer's obligation to pay the taxes. TIR transits are carried out in bond, i.e. the lorry must be sealed as well as bearing the carnet. The security payment system is administered by the International Road Transport Union (IRU).

The TIR procedure is mostly used with Eastern European countries that are not in the EU (e.g. Russia and Ukraine), Turkey, and parts of the Near East. Since the formation of the European single market, the TIR procedure has become unnecessary for intra-EU goods transport.

== Membership ==
Saudi Arabia acceded to the convention on 17 May 2018, and the convention entered into force for Saudi Arabia on 17 November 2018. Egypt acceded to the convention on 16 December 2020, and entered into force in Egypt on 16 June 2021. With the accession of Saudi Arabia and Egypt, the TIR Convention had seventy-seven Contracting Parties. In March 2023, Iraq became the 78th member of the convention, and in April 2025, after successful pilot operations, TIR went fully operational in the country.

In light of the expected increase in world trade, further enlargement of its geographical scope and the forthcoming introduction of an electronic TIR System, it is expected that the TIR system will remain the only truly global customs transit system.

Due to the large blue-and-white TIR plates carried by vehicles using the TIR convention, the word "TIR" entered many languages, such as Italian, Polish, European Portuguese, Romanian or Turkish, as a neologism, becoming the default generic name of a large lorry.

== Annex 11 and eTIR Project ==
Formed in February 2020, the Contracting Parties to the TIR Convention adopted several amendments, including Annex 11, which provides the legal basis for UNECE to host and administer the eTIR system. This allowed the creation of eTIR, a paperless operation of the United Nations TIR Convention, in line with the Secretary General's Roadmap for Digital Cooperation. The legal basis for eTIR went into force in May 2021 but adoption of this digital system was not immediate; Tajikistan and Kyrgyzstan transported goods across their mutual boarder using eTIR for the first time in May 2026, and continued implmentation of eTIR in the Eurasian Economic Union was ongoing in 2026.

eTIR was designed to reduce administrative burden and fraud. Its adoption cemented the continued use of TIR as the preeminent global transport system. eTIR has been shown to result in greater security and efficiency for international transportation systems, as digitization of the TIR system has reduced transit times and overhead costs.

== See also ==
- ATA Carnet
- Carnet de Passages en Douane
- CMR Convention
