= Herbert C. Adams =

British philatelist (1873–1955)

Herbert Charles Vassall Adams (16 December 1873 – 1 July 1955) was a British philatelist who was added to the Roll of Distinguished Philatelists in 1946.

Adams was an expert on the early postage stamps of Great Britain and a vice-president of the Royal Philatelic Society London.

He died in a motor accident. In addition to paying tribute to his philatelic abilities, Adams was described by his long-time collaborator K.M. Beaumont in The London Philatelist as "a lovable character, the type of man of whom Horace might have been thinking when he wrote si fractus illabatur orbis, impavidum ferient ruinae. He was a great little man whose place in the councils and hearts of the Members of the Society it will not be possible to fill."
