= Carnet de Passages en Douane =

Customs document for possessions

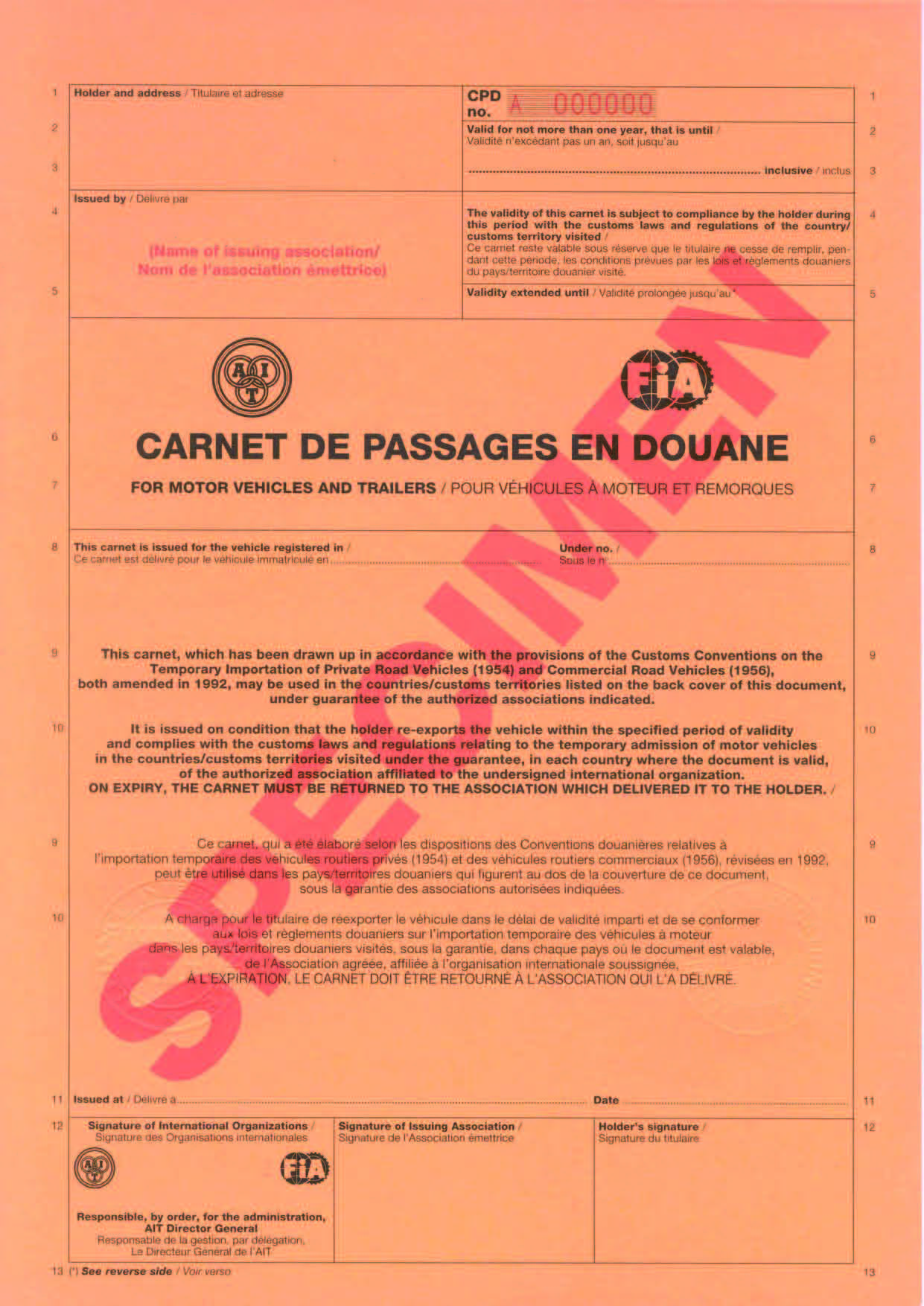
Front page of a Carnet de Passages en Douane

The Carnet de Passages en Douane (English: Customs Passage Book) is a customs document that identifies a traveller's motor vehicle or other valuable equipment or baggage. It is required in order to take a motor vehicle into a significant number of countries around the world.

While the system is based on the 1954 UN convention on the Temporary importation of private road vehciles and on the 1956 UN convention on the temporary importation of commercial road vehicles; Several organizations around the world are currently managing CPD networks in the absence of an exclusive mandate from the United Nations Economic Commission for Europe similar to the TIR Carnet System

== Usage ==
The carnet allows travellers to temporarily import their vehicles, or other items of value such as broadcasting equipment, without having to leave a cash deposit at the border. It is, in essence, an international guarantee for payment of customs duties and taxes to a government should the vehicle or item not be re-exported from that country. Persons who temporarily import their vehicles or items into countries where the Carnet is required must agree to obey the laws and regulations of that country and particularly the conditions of temporary importation.

The Carnet contains relevant information about the items or vehicle – make, model, colour, engine capacity, seating capacity, registration number, owner and value.

In order to obtain a carnet, the owner of the items is required to provide a security based on the countries traveled to, age and market value of the items. Generally, four types of security are acceptable from motoring organisations:

- Cash bond
- Banker's letter of indemnity
- Insurance policy
- Loss Prevention Security – US and Canada only

The l'Alliance Internationale de Tourisme / Federation Internationale de l'Automobile (AIT/FIA) is one of the International Organizational bodies managing a CPD network. CPD Networks are usually responsible for the inventory and distribution of CPDs within several customs territories together with issuing and guaranteeing organizations. In the Middle East, several organizations are currently issuing CPDs also named "Triptik" or "Trip Tickets".

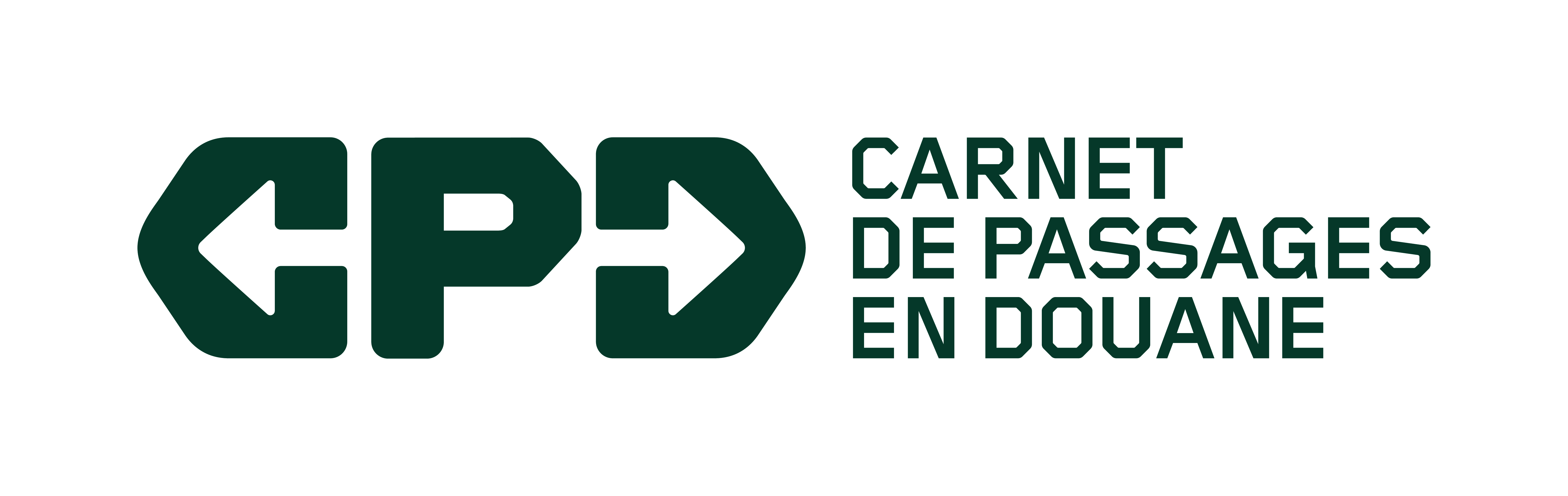
Logo of the CPD carnet issued by the FIA, one of the CPD issuing networks

== Countries where a Carnet de Passages en Douane is required ==
The map below is based on the Overlanding Associations website, which is daily updated with additional information.

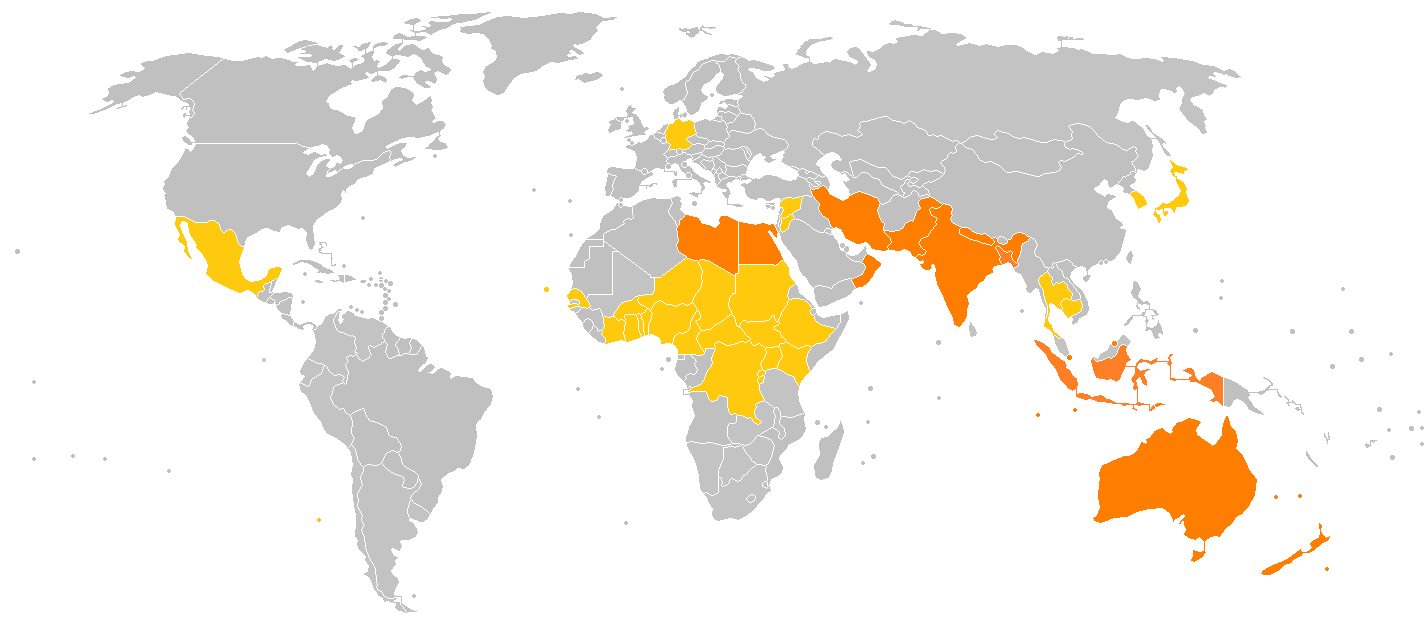
Carnet requirements Carnet required Carnet recommended Carnet not required or no data

Varying sources differ slightly on exactly which countries require a carnet, however generally the following countries require a carnet for private vehicle entry.

=== Africa ===
Required for

- Egypt
- Lesotho
- Libya
- Malawi
- South Sudan

Recommended for

- Benin
- Burkina Faso
- Cameroon
- Central African Republic
- Chad
- DR Congo
- Djibouti
- Ethiopia
- Gambia
- Ghana
- Guinea-Bissau
- Ivory Coast
- Mali
- Niger
- Nigeria
- Rwanda
- Senegal
- Togo
- Zambia
- Zimbabwe

=== Americas ===
Note that as of 2016 the carnet is rarely used on the South American continent, in spite of the lingering perceptions suggested by entries here.

Required for

- Brazil
- Colombia (only recommended according to some sources) not required if Canadian
- Ecuador (only recommended according to some sources) not required if Canadian
- Jamaica
- Peru (only recommended according to some sources) not required if Canadian
- Trinidad and Tobago
- Venezuela (only recommended according to some sources) not required if Canadian

Unless Canadian, recommended for

- Argentina
- Chile
- Uruguay

=== Asia & Middle East ===
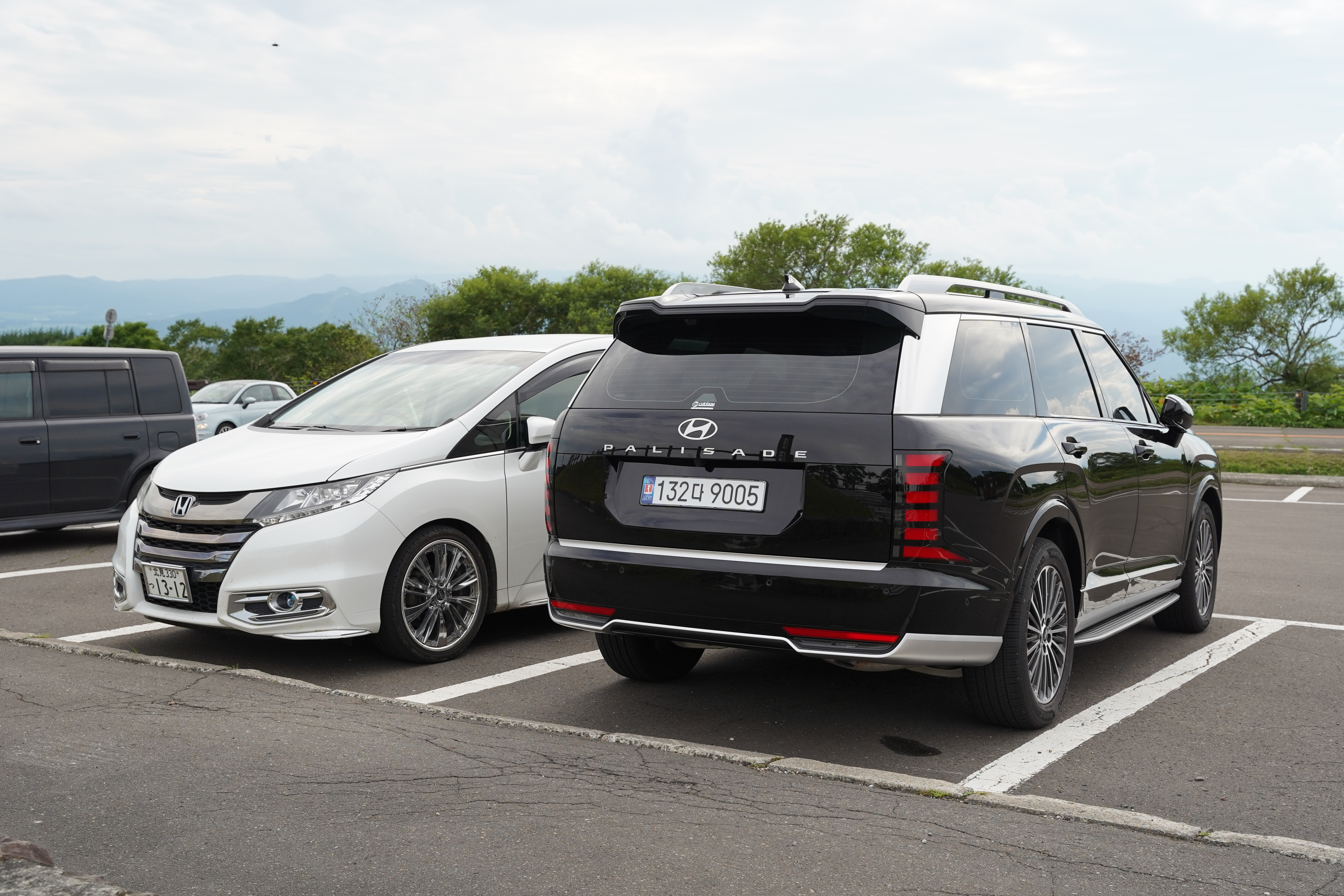
A South Korean private motor vehicle operating in Japan, where a carnet is required for entering vehicles

Required for

- Bahrain
- Brunei
- East Timor
- India
- Indonesia
- Iran
- Japan
- Kuwait
- Malaysia
- Nepal
- Oman
- Pakistan
- Qatar
- Singapore
- Sri Lanka
- UAE
- Myanmar

Recommended for

- Bangladesh Foreigners cannot bring their own car to Bangladesh
- Jordan
- Syria

=== Oceania ===
- Australia
- New Zealand

== See also ==
- Customs Convention on the Temporary Importation of Private Road Vehicles
- ATA Carnet
