= WorldTracer =

Global tracking system for lost luggage in air travel

WorldTracer is an industry-standard, fully-automated system for tracing lost or delayed baggage. It's operated by SITA. It has been in operation since at least 1991 and is used by all airlines that are members of IATA. Most of the low-cost carriers that are based in Europe such as Norwegian Air Shuttle, Wizz Air also use WorldTracer.

== Operation ==
WorldTracer operates globally and can exchange information with 2800+ locations. It tracks and follows baggage for up to 100 days and collaborates with other services. The World Tracer internet interface allows passengers to track their bags by entering a transaction number.

Whenever baggage is found without an owner, it can be registered as on-hand baggage. It is then automatically matched with various missing-baggage files (called AHLs). Whenever an on-hand produces a likely match, the station that registered the missing bag file receives an alert. The bag is matched based on its routing number, tag number, passenger's surname, type of baggage and content. When a handling agent finds an on-hand which matches one of AHLs, he/she can request the on-hand by sending a message to the station that registered it.

=== Lost and Found Property ===
In 2021, SITA launched WorldTracer Lost and Found Property, an artificial intelligence-based platform that helps airports manage objects lost or misplaced by passengers. Using the platform, airline employees can enter details about a lost item, which can be matched to any reported lost request.

== Tracking numbers ==
The tracking number format is AAABBNNNNN, where AAA is the airport's IATA code, BB is the airline's IATA code and NNNNN is a 5-digit tracking number. For example, the tracking number PHLDL19676 is from Philadelphia International Airport, flew on Delta Air Lines, and has the tracking number of 19676.
