= Automated System for Customs Data =

Computerized system administering a country's customs

The Automated System for Customs Data (ASYCUDA) is a computerized system designed by the United Nations Conference on Trade and Development (UNCTAD) to administer a country's customs. In 2004 there were more than 50 operational projects with expenditures exceeding US$7 million. It is the largest technical cooperation programme of the UNCTAD, covering over 80 countries and 4 regional projects.

There are three generations of ASYCUDA in use: ASYCUDA version 2.7, ASYCUDA++ and ASYCUDA World. They were built using different paradigms and solutions available at conception. ASYCUDA World is the most recent version. Cape Verde adopted use of ASYCUDA World in January 2016.

UNCTAD's aim was to build a computer system to assist customs authorities (or their local equivalents) all over the world to automate and control their core processes and obtain timely, accurate and valuable information to support government projections and planning.
