= CMR Convention =

1956 United Nations convention

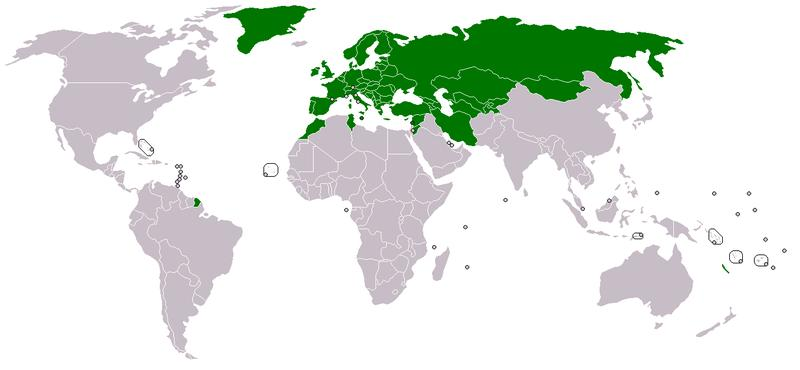
Maps of signatories for CMR Convention

The CMR Convention (full title Convention on the Contract for the International Carriage of Goods by Road; in French Convention relative au contrat de transport international de marchandises par route) is a United Nations convention signed in Geneva on 19 May 1956 concerning transportation of cargo by road.

== History ==
The treaty was ratified by the majority of European states. As of January 2022, it has been ratified by 58 states.

Based on the CMR, the International Road Transport Union (IRU) developed a standard CMR waybill. The CMR waybill is prepared in three languages. On the back is the text again in three languages. This aids the waybill in being accepted and recognised throughout Europe. Checked by customs and police, a transport document must be present when the shipment is transported. The document itself is not prescribed; there is a minimum of information required on the CMR. If hazardous substances are being shipped, some additional information is required, as described in ADR.

This consignment is completed by the sender. The consignment should only be completed with a ballpoint pen, typewriter or computer. The driver who uses the consignment should be familiar with the consignment, and with the waybill, able to inform the recipient about the importance of the various topics on the waybill.

As of 27 May 2008, according to an additional protocol to the CMR-convention, it is also possible to use an updated electronic consignment note – eCMR. As of February 2017, several solutions are available. ITD, Trade association for the Danish road transport of goods has developed a solution; the eCMR waybill. The eCMR is also available on the market in France, Spain and the Netherlands.

First cross-border usage of eCMR took place on 19 January 2017, between Spain and France supported by ASTIC (Asociación de Transporte Internacional por Carretera) and FNTR (Fédération Nationale des Transports Routiers).

On 24 February 2017, the UN reaffirmed its support for eCMR.

The CMR-waybill consists of the following parts:

1. red printing for sender
2. blue printing for receiver
3. green imprint on carrier
4. black print on second carrier (if present)

"CMR" is an abbreviation of the French title of the convention, Convention relative au contrat de transport international de marchandises par route.

== See also ==
- Warsaw Convention
- TIR Convention
