= Hague Protocol =

1955 treaty to amend the Warsaw Convention

Protocol to Amend the Convention for the Unification of Certain Rules Relating to International Carriage by Air
- Signed: 28 September 1955
- Location: The Hague
- Effective: 1 August 1963
- Parties: 137
- Depositary: Government of Poland
- Languages: French, English, Spanish

The Hague Protocol, officially the Protocol to Amend the Convention for the Unification of Certain Rules Relating to International Carriage by Air, is a treaty signed on 28 September 1955 in The Hague. It serves to amend the Warsaw Convention. While officially the Hague Protocol is intended to become a single entity with the Warsaw Convention, it has only been ratified by 137 of the original 152 parties to the Warsaw Convention. The binding version of the treaty is written in French, but certified versions also exist in English and Spanish. The official depository of the treaty is the Government of Poland.

== The Warsaw Convention ==
The Warsaw Convention was established to create a legal basis for commercial aviation, both cargo and passenger. Specifically, it allowed for the basis of liability to be assigned to air-carriers in the event of an accident.

== Purpose ==
There were multiple reasons as to why the Hague Protocol was added as a provision to the Warsaw Convention. Firstly, as the original Convention was written in 1929 and with the advance of technology and law the original treaty had to be updated. Secondly, and perhaps more importantly, the Hague Protocol limited the liability that commercial airliners would have to take on in the event of an accident.
