= War in North-West Pakistan order of battle =

Conflict involving Pakistani forces and militant groups

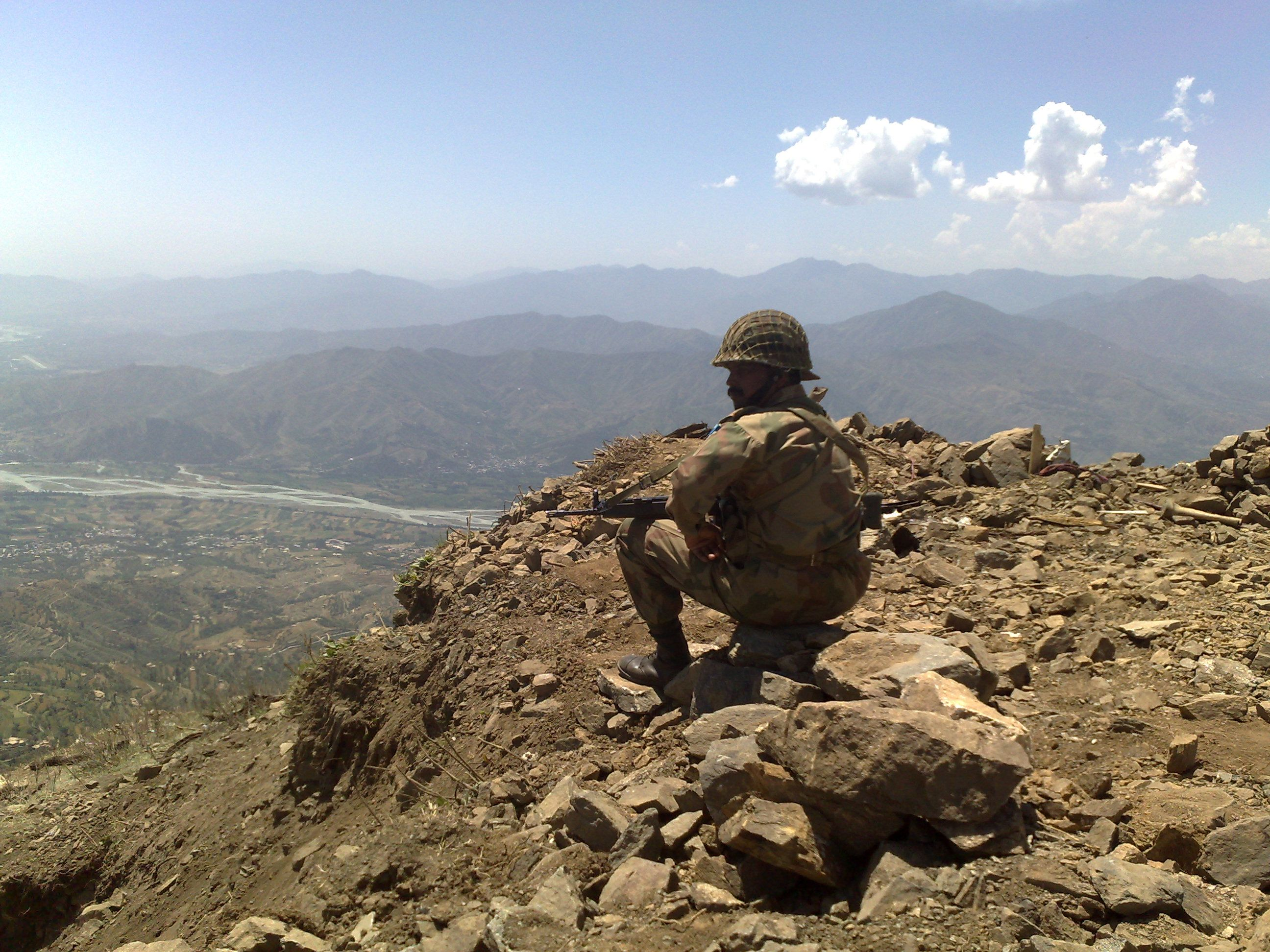
An airborne paratrooper observes the mountains after the military operation in 2009.

The North-Western Contingent order of battle (NWPORBAT; officially order of battle is known as "Tri-services framework (TSW)") is the comprehensive deposition and systematic structure of the unified Pakistan military forces in tackling down and controlling the insurgency in Western Pakistan. The deployments began in 2002 after the International Security Assistance Force invasion of Afghanistan in 2001 in a response to the deadly terrorist attacks in New York, United States.

This article lists deployed unified military units under the command of the Joint Chiefs of Staff Committee (JCSC) which controls both combatant operations and reconstruction efforts, which is often led by the National Reconstruction Bureau (NRB). Since 2002, the number of troops stationing and circling increased to keep the momentum and pressure on the insurgent groups laying militant attacks on Pakistan. In 2008, Chairman joint chiefs General Tariq Majid submitted his report on new deployment and formations under title as "Tri-services framework", to Prime Minister Yousaf Raza Gillani which was approved by the Prime minister.

== Deployment of the military forces ==
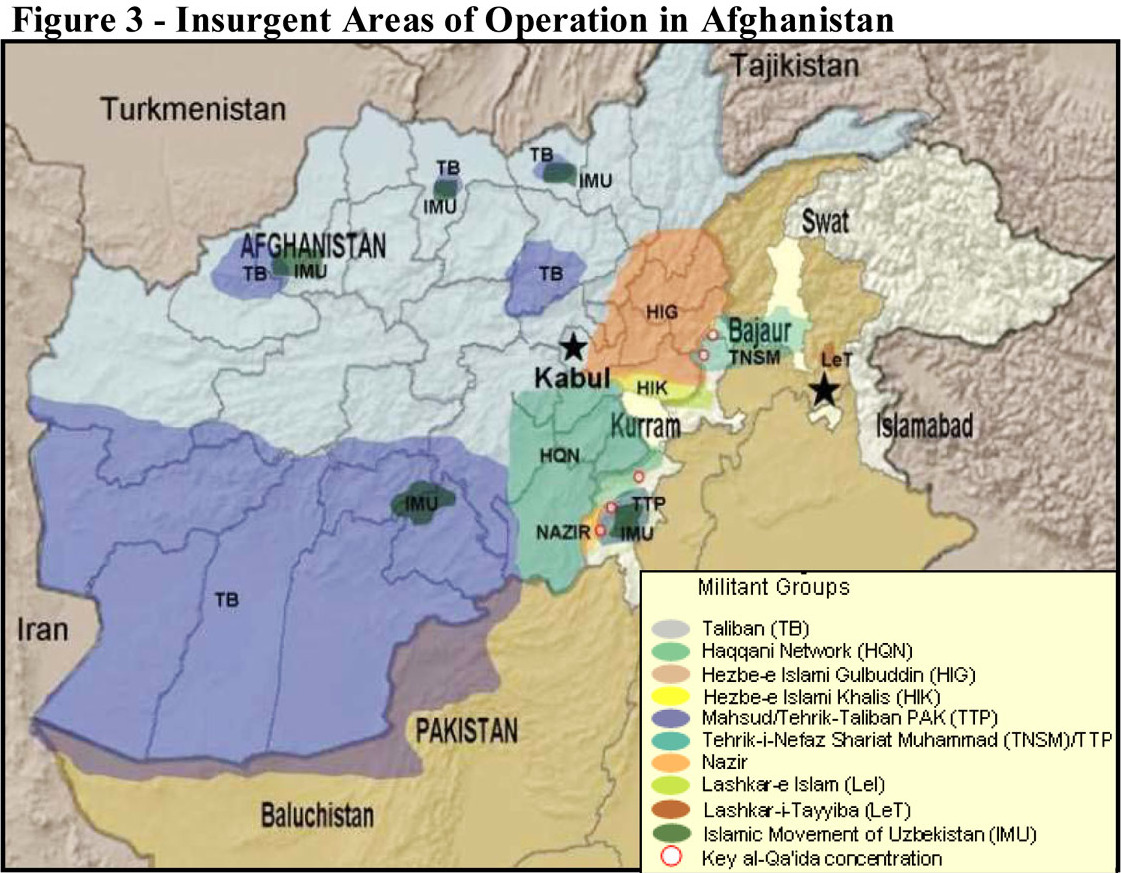
US Army map displays insurgent areas of operation.

After the 9/11 attacks on the United States, the U.S. military responded with a large invasion of Afghanistan in 2001. Initially, all Pakistan Army troops were mobilised in different military formations and deployment continued in all over the country during this period, under the command of Chairman joint chiefs General Pervez Musharraf, also self-appointing President at that time. After laying discussion principle Joint Chiefs of Staff Committee, the XI Corps (roughly ~60,000 men) was deployed under the command of Lieutenant-General Alijan Aurakzai in North-western. Other formations were rested in eastern, southern, and the northern borders of the country. By 2004, additional battalions were stationed by General Musharraf to help curb infiltration into Pakistan through its porous border. On 7 October 2004, Musharraf approved the appointment of his close aide, General Ehsan-ul-Haq, who superseded seven colleagues who was brutally criticised by the media. The appointment was highly controversial and political since Admiral Shahid Karimullah, Chief of Naval Staff, was the senior-most four-star officer in the armed forces. After becoming the chairman joint chiefs, General Ehsan-ul-Haq oversaw the ground troops deployment of army only, while the air force was kept out of the region. The strategy proved to be wrong as the violence spread out all over the country, and the army was increasingly in great pressure from the militants in 2004-07. In 2007, chairman joint chiefs General Ehsan-ul-Haq admitted the only ground troops deployment was wrong as the "Waziristan truce went wrong". President Musharraf ordering the highly controversial and criticised military action, Silence, to take over the Red Mosque complex plummeted Musharraf and General Ehsan's support.

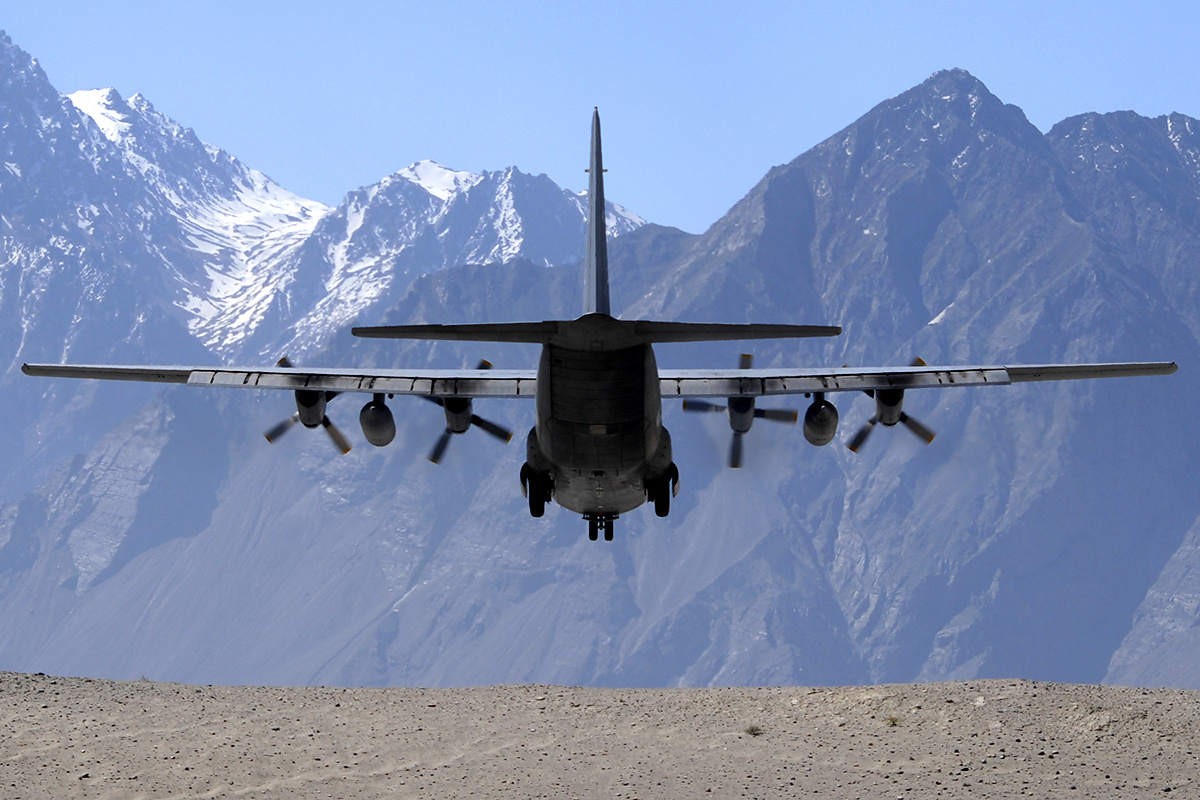
The Pakistan Air Force took active operational participation in 2010 as part of new strategy.

In 2007, President Musharraf approved the General Tariq Majid and General Ashfaq Parvez Kayani's appointment to four-star appointment. Keeping aware of the situation, General Majid began studying the new deployment of Pakistan armed forces. After Musharraf was ousted from the presidency in a threat of impeachment movement, General Majid submitted his studies to Prime Minister Yousaf Raza Gillani and stressed out on the need to strengthen the tri-services framework.

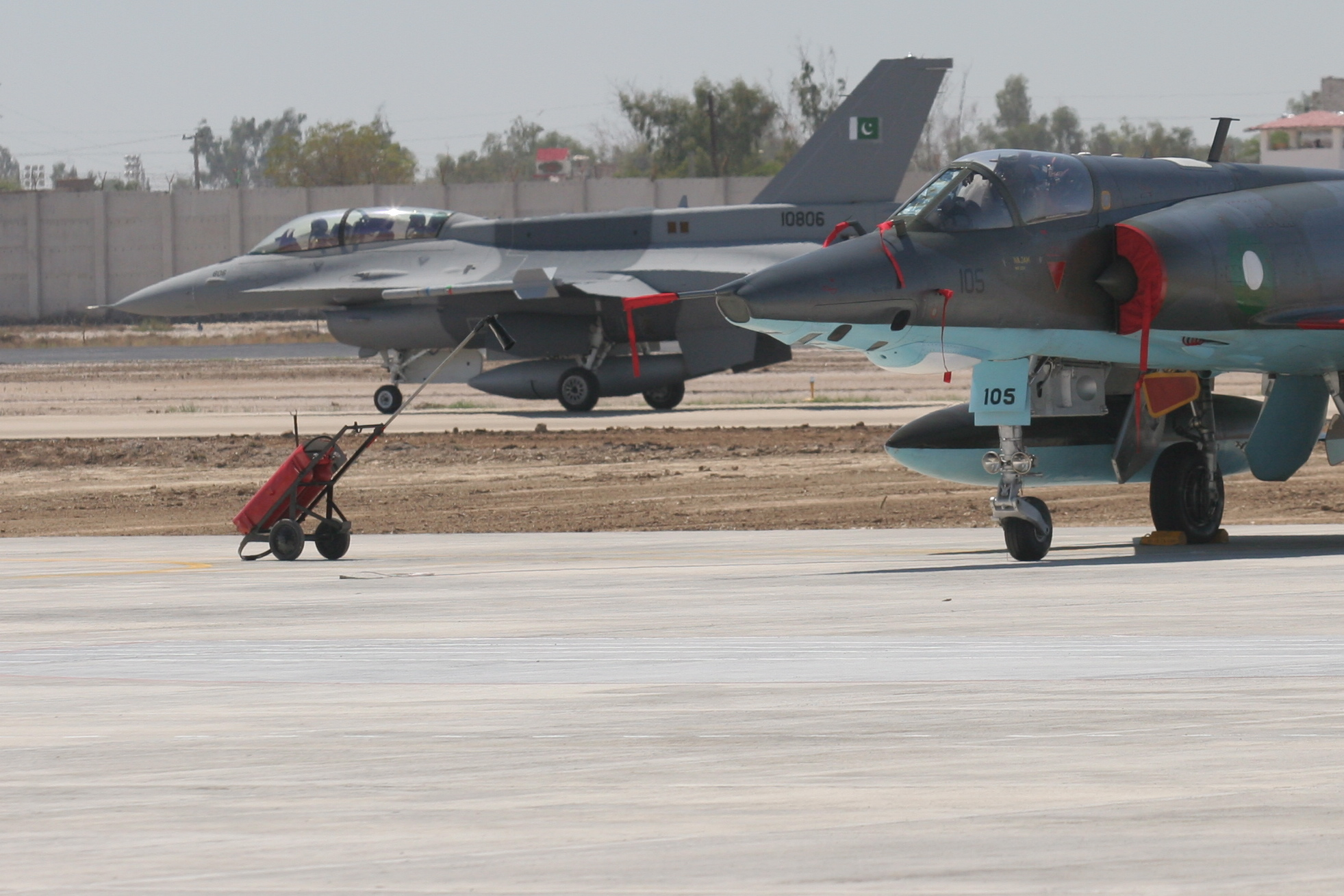
PAF's Mirage (right) flew together with F-16s in operations against the militancy, 2009.

The new order of battle now known as, "tri-services framework", General Tariq Majid strongly emphasised to harmonise individual capacities of the services so that efforts are synergised within a framework of jointness and inter-operability to meet present and future challenges. Since 2008, the combined formations of Pakistan military has over a hundred thousand troops in the region. From open sources it seems that 4 Pakistan army divisions, assisted by the PAF and the navy, are involved in the operation, with a JS HQ coordinating their efforts. They appear to be two regular and two heavy infantry divisions Frontier Corps operates under a separate command, but its units are often parcelled out to the Army. The Corps in the region, the XII Corps, usually has 2 infantry divisions, it has received from what can be gleaned from open sources two additional divisions, one from Multan; the 14th, and another from Kashmir; the 23rd.

== Unified military formations and deployments ==
Unified Pakistan Military forces deployments and formations
Pakistan Army	Corps	Corps Headquarters
Active operational Corps	XI Corps	Peshawar, KPK Province
Divisions (s)	Operational capacity	Note(s)
7th Infantry Division; 19th Infantry Division; 4th Infantry Division; 3rd Infantry Division; Frontier Corps	Operating in Bajuar; Operating in Kohat; Operating in S. Waziristan; Operating in Swat. Operating in Peshawar	Former part of the II Strike Corps from Punjab; Former part of X Corps from Kashmir. Paramilitary command under KPK Government
Pakistan Air Force (PAF)	Command	Air Headquarters
Active Air Command	Northern Air Command	Peshawar, KPK Province
Wing(s)	Air Commanding Operational HQ	Note(s)
Air Operational AHQ; No. 36 Tactical Attack Wing; No. 37 Combat Training Wing; No. 33 Fighter Wing; No. 35 Composite Air Wing; 2nd SOS Group	Command, PAF Base North; Command, PAF Base Mianvali; Command, PAF Base Minhas; Command, PAF Base Nur; Command, PAF Base Kohat	
Pakistan Navy (PN)	Command	Naval Headquarters
Active Command(s)	Navy Northern Command	Skardu, Gilgit–Baltistan
Formations	Operational capacity	Note(s)
Special Service Group-[Navy] Pakistan Marines; Naval Air Command	SOF teams deployed SOF teams deployed No. 28th Squadron; No. 101st Squadron	Classified numbers P-3C Orion are deployed. Classified numbers of Navy's fighter jets, Mirage-5, are deployed
Civilian and federal rehabilitation programmes	Military relief programmes	International efforts
NRB, NDMA, ERRA, SRC, NADRA, NARA	FWO, FRC, NLC, MES	United States Agency for International Development

== Commanders ==
Joint Field Operations Commanders
Precedence	Rank, name	Portrait	Start of tenure	End of tenure	Armed Forces Branch
1	Lieutenant-General Ali Jan Aurakzai, PA		15 October 2001	30 March 2004	Pakistan Army
2	Lieutenant-General Mushtak Beg, PA		3 June 2004	17 April 2007	Pakistan Army
3	Lieutenant-General Masood Aslam, PA		17 April 2007	29 April 2010	Pakistan Army
4	Vice-Admiral Shahid Iqbal, PN		29 April 2010	12 August 2010	Pakistan Navy
5	Air Marshal Waseem-ud-Din, PAF		7 October 2011	6 December 2012	Pakistan Air Force
6	Vice-Admiral Muhammad Zakaullah, PN		6 January 2013	Present	Pakistan Navy
