= Driver's licences in Canada =

Samples of driver's licences currently issued by Alberta, British Columbia, and Ontario.

In Canada, driver's licences are issued to drivers by each individual province or territory in which the driver is residing. All provinces and territories within Canada mutually recognize driver's licences from other provinces and territories for identification and driving status. They are also recognized throughout the United States for similar purposes. Canadian driver's licences can be used internationally, however some countries require a supplemental International Driving Permit for further legitimacy.

The American Association of Motor Vehicle Administrators provides a standard for the design of driving permits and identification cards in the United States and Canada. The newest card design standard released is the 2025 AAMVA DL/ID Card Design Standard (CDS). The AAMVA standard generally follows part 1 and part 2 of ISO/IEC 18013-1 (ISO compliant driving licence). The ISO standard in turn specifies requirements for a card that is aligned with the UN Conventions on Road Traffic, namely the Geneva Convention on Road Traffic and the Vienna Convention on Road Traffic.

== Age of eligibility ==
Canada's driving age is determined on a province-by-province basis. The age to begin driving varies by province, with the earliest being Alberta at 14 years of age. The provinces use a graduated driver licensing (GDL) system for a standard car and light-truck licence to ensure the proficiency of drivers.

The driving age in the various Canadian provinces is as follows:

Driving age by province
Province	Standard age for learner's permit	Standard age for restricted licence	Minimum age for restricted licence (with driver education)	Standard age for full licence	Notes
Alberta	14	16	16	18	Drivers may be eligible to reduce their two year probationary period by up to six months by completing a Class 5 or Class 6 driver training program from a driver training school licensed by the Alberta government. Upon completion of the Class 5 probationary period, drivers will automatically have their licence upgraded to the full, non-GDL Class 5 licence.
British Columbia	16	17	17	19	Restricted licence stage can be shortened from two years to one year and six months if driver goes through an accredited driver education program.
Manitoba	16	16 years 9 months	16 years 3 months	18	Learner's permit can be acquired at 15 years and 6 months, and restricted licence at 16 years and 3 months, if student uses an accredited high school driver education program.
New Brunswick	16	17	16 years 8 months	18	Restricted licence can be acquired in 8 months (so 16 years, 8 months) if driver uses an accredited driver education program.
Newfoundland and Labrador	16	17	16 years 8 months	18	Restricted licence can be acquired in 8 months (so 16 years, 8 months) if driver uses an accredited driver education program.
Nova Scotia	16	16 years 3 months	16 years 3 months	19	Driver education is mandatory. If a new driver completes the long course, they can take the road test and obtain their restricted licence after 3 months (16 years, 3 months). If they complete the short course, they must wait 6 months (so 16 years, 6 months) to be eligible for a restricted licence.
Ontario	16	17	16 years 8 months	18	Restricted licence can be acquired in 8 months (so 16 years, 8 months) if driver goes to accredited driver education program. This reduces age for full licence to 17 and 8 months old.
Prince Edward Island	16	17	16 years 9 months	19	Restricted licence can be acquired in 9 months (so 16 years, 9 months) if driver uses an accredited driver education program.
Saskatchewan	16	16 years 9 months	16	18	Driver education is mandatory. Learner's permit can be acquired at 15 years of age, and restricted licence at 16 years of age, if student uses an accredited high school driver education program.
Québec	16	17	17	19	Driver education is mandatory.

Driving age by territory
Territory	Standard age for learner's permit	Standard age for restricted licence	Standard age for full licence	Notes
Yukon	15	16	17 years 6 months	Manual and road laws partly derived from British Columbia.
Northwest Territories	15	16	17	Manual and road laws partly derived from Alberta.
Nunavut	15	16	18	Manual and road laws derived from federal guidelines. Restricted licence allows a driver to drive only within Nunavut.

== Standard data field labelling ==
Except for licences issued in Alberta, British Columbia and Saskatchewan, and the DND 404 licence issued by the Department of National Defence, each data field on the licence is labelled with a number. This is required by the American Association of Motor Vehicle Administrators' design standard. The AAMVA standard generally follows part 1 and part 2 of ISO/IEC 18013-1 (ISO compliant driving licence). The ISO standard in turn specifies requirements for a card that is aligned with the UN Conventions on Road Traffic, namely the Geneva Convention on Road Traffic and the Vienna Convention on Road Traffic.

1. surname
2. other names
3. date of birth
4. a) date of issue, b) date of expiry, c) (not used), d) different number from the one under heading 5, for administrative purposes
5. licence number
6. photograph of holder
7. signature of holder
8. address
9. licence categories (9a is used for endorsements)
10. (not used)
11. (not used)
12. restrictions
13. (not used)
14. (not used)
15. sex
16. height
17. weight
18. eye colour
19. hair colour

Some fields are optional. For example, some provinces omit some or all of these fields: 4d, 17, 18, and 19.

== Provinces ==
=== Alberta ===
- Class 7 (Learner): This permit can be obtained at 14 years of age, and can only be used when a non-probationary licensed driver (Class 5 or above; see below) over the age of 18 accompanies the driver. The fully licensed driver must be sitting in the front passenger seat. A computerized knowledge test requiring a mark of at least 83.3% as well as a vision test must be passed to obtain this licence. Restrictions on the Class 7 licence include zero blood alcohol content while driving and the inability to drive between midnight and 5 am. Class 7 drivers may operate mopeds without an accompanying driver. A consent form must be signed by a parent or guardian for an applicant under the age of 18.
- Class 6 (Motorcycle): This permit allows an operator to drive a motorcycle without a supervising rider. The minimum age to obtain this licence is 16. A Class 7 licence must have been held for one year before it is possible to apply for a Class 6 licence. A learner holding a Class 7 licence must not drive a motorcycle during the night (defined as one hour after sunset, until 5 am or one hour before sunrise, whichever is later). Learners with a Class 7 or Class 5 Probationary licence may not operate (or sit on) a motorcycle with a blood alcohol content greater than zero. Learners with a Class 5 (non-probationary) or higher licence (Class 1, 2, 3, or 4) have no restrictions except that a supervising rider must be present.
- Class 5-GDL (Probationary): This licence can be obtained once a driver has held a Class 7 licence (Learner's Permit) for at least one year without suspension. In addition, the driver must be 16 years of age before he or she may apply for this licence. This licence allows one to drive without an accompanying fully licensed driver. However, this licence has more restrictions than a non-probationary licence. Fewer demerit points are allowed and drivers must have zero blood alcohol content while driving. A probationary licence does not qualify the licence-holder to serve as an accompanying driver for a Class 7 driver. A basic road test is required to obtain this licence.
- Class 5 (Full, Non-GDL Driver's Licence): This licence can be obtained after having held the Class 5 Probationary licence for two years without suspension. The minimum age to obtain this licence is 18. An advanced road test is no longer required as of April 1, 2023 to obtain this licence. A driver automatically is eligible for the Class 5 licence so long as they have no demerits or suspensions in the last year preceding their eligibility. If the driver has demerits or suspensions, they must wait another year before becoming eligible for their Class 5 licence. A driver with this licence is referred to as a "fully licensed driver".
- Class 4: This permit allows the operator to drive a taxi, ambulance, or bus with seats for up to 24 passengers.
- Class 3: This permit allows an operator to drive a motor vehicle with 3 or more axles, or a motor vehicle with 3 or more axles pulling a trailer with one or more axles (assuming the trailer does not have air brakes).
- Class 2: This permit allows an operator to operate any bus, in addition to the vehicles permitted by holders of Class 3/4/5 licences.
- Class 1: This permit allows an operator to operate any motor vehicle except a motorcycle (as motorcycles always require the Class 6 licence specifically).

Drivers upgrading to a Class 1, 2, 3, or 4 licence must possess a Class 5 (non-probationary) licence and be at least 18 years of age to apply.

==== Endorsement ====
- Air brakes: Air brake endorsements are required for any driver of a vehicle with an air-only braking system or a combination air and hydraulic braking system. Any driver in Alberta may obtain an air brake endorsement after completing an approved air brake course, which includes a practical exam, and writing the written knowledge test at the registry. On all classes, except Class 1, the endorsement is represented as a "Q" on the licence. It is not shown on the Class 1 licence because all Class 1 drivers licensed in Alberta are required to have attended an approved air brake course; a Class 1 operator's licence cannot be obtained without it. The written knowledge test for Class 1 can be taken prior to having attended an air brake course; however, driver training can not commence until after the course is completed.
- Transportation of dangerous goods: TDG is not an endorsement placed on an operator licence, but rather is required training received generally from the employer for anyone who offers for transport, transports, or handles dangerous goods. Both employees and self-employed persons must have a dangerous goods training certificate to transport dangerous goods. It is employer-offered due to the wide variety of dangerous goods that may be transported, so the training is employer and commodity specific.

=== British Columbia ===
- Class 8L (Motorcycle Learner's Permit): This permit can be first obtained at age 16, just as the Class 7L. There are many restrictions until the rider passes a "Motorcycle Skills Test", which is conducted on a parking lot and involves basic manoeuvring skills. After this test, the rider can ride alone, with much fewer restrictions.
- Class 7L (Learner's Permit): This permit can first be obtained at age 16, and requires a person under the age of 19 to obtain consent from a parent or legal guardian. To obtain this permit, one must take a knowledge test, which requires 80% to pass. A person holding this licence must be accompanied by a fully licensed driver over 25. They may have one additional passenger besides the supervisor. The driver must maintain a blood-alcohol count of zero (i.e. none in their blood), display a large 'L' decal on the back of their vehicle, have no more than two passengers (including the supervisor), and must not drive between 12AM and 5AM. Use of electronic devices is prohibited. The 7L licence is good for two years. After 12 months, the driver may take a 35-minute driving test to advance to the next level.
- Class 7 (Novice Licence), also called the "N" stage: This permit may be obtained once a driver is 17, after successful completion of the Class 7L driving test. A Class 7N licence is good for five years, and the stage takes a minimum of two years to complete (unless the person graduates from an accredited driving course, which reduces the length of time required to 18 months). Drivers must display a large 'N' decal on the back of their vehicle. Restrictions include 0 blood alcohol and a limit of one passenger (the limit being waived for anyone in the immediate family, and entirely if a supervisor over the age of 25 with a valid Class 5 (or above) licence is present.) Any infraction of the traffic law by the possessor of a Class 7 licence can result in a prohibition, after which the possessor must begin the Class 7N program from the start. After two years with the Class 7N, the licence-holder may take the 45-minute Class 5 road test. Successful completion of this test grants a Class 5 passenger vehicle licence.
- Class 6 (Motorcycle Licence): This licence allows the holder to operate a motorcycle with no restrictions.
- Class 5 (Full Vehicle Licence): This is a full passenger-vehicle licence. It has no additional restrictions, unlike the Class 7 licences.
- Class 4 (Commercial) restricted: Permits the holder to operate taxis, limousines, ambulances, special buses used to transport people with disabilities and other special vehicles; also permits the holder to operate vehicles in Class 5. Minimum age to obtain is 19.
- Class 4 (Commercial) unrestricted: In addition to the vehicles listed for Class 4 restricted above, this permits the holder to operate buses with a maximum seating capacity of 25, including the driver.
- Class 3 (Commercial, heavy trucks): Permits the holder to operate trucks with more than two axles, including dump trucks and large tow trucks; also permits the holder to operate vehicles in Class 5. Minimum age to obtain is 18.
- Class 2 (Commercial, buses): Permits the holder to operate buses, including school buses, special activity buses, and special vehicles; also permits the holder to operate vehicles in Classes 4 and 5. Minimum age to obtain is 19.
- Class 1 (Commercial, semi-trailer): Permits the holder to operate semi-trailer trucks; also permits the holder to operate all motor vehicles or combinations of vehicles except motorcycles. Minimum age to obtain is 19.

British Columbia has been using a GDL system since August 1998. The program was last revised in October 2003, which involved large changes to the time it took to acquire a full licence (previously, a person could complete the Class 7L stage in as little as 3 months, and the Class 7N in 12, and no passenger limit was enforced above Class 7L). British Columbia requires all new resident drivers to take a driving knowledge test and a road test in order to get a BC driver's licence, except for people holding a valid driver's licence from other Canadian jurisdictions, Austria, Australia, France, Germany, Guernsey, Japan, the Netherlands, New Zealand, South Korea, Switzerland, Taiwan, the United Kingdom, or the United States.

=== Manitoba ===
- Class 6M (motorcycle training course licence): Must pass a knowledge test and enables the driver to take a motorcycle training course. Minimum age: 16.
- Class 6L (motorcycle learner's-stage licence): Issued after completing a motorcycle training course. Must maintain 0 blood alcohol content (BAC). No passengers and no nighttime driving is allowed at this stage. After 9 months, the rider is eligible to take a road test to graduate to the intermediate stage.
- Class 6I (motorcycle intermediate-stage licence): Issued after completing a Class 6 road test. Must maintain 0 BAC.
- Class 6F (motorcycle full-stage licence): Issued after 15 months in the intermediate stage. Must have 0 BAC for the first 36 months of this stage.
- Class 5L (vehicle learner's licence): Must have a supervising driver in the front seat who has held a full licence for at least 3 years and has a BAC less than 0.05, can have as many passengers as there are working seat belts in rear. Eligible to take the class 5I road test after a minimum of 9 months. Minimum age: 16 (15.5 if entered in high school driver's education program)
- Class 5I (vehicle intermediate-stage licence): Acquired upon successful completion of road test. Must have 0 BAC. Only passenger restrictions are from midnight to 5 am, when there can be only one front-seat passenger, or a supervising driver plus as many seatbelts as there are in the rear. Past midnight til 5 am the supervising driver must be under the 0.8 BAC limit.
- Class 5F (vehicle full-stage licence): This is a full passenger-vehicle licence. Acquired after a minimum of 15 months with a class 5I licence. After 36 months with this licence, the driver is allowed to have up to 0.05 BAC and be a supervising driver. The licence holder is eligible to upgrade to a class 1–4 licence if 18 years of age or older.
- Class 4: Permits the holder to operate taxis, ambulances, other emergency vehicles, busses with a passenger capacity of 10–24, and school busses with a capacity of 10–36. Also permits the holder to operate vehicles in Class 5. Minimum age: 18.
- Class 3: Permits the holder to operate trucks with more than two axles, including any combination of vehicles, or a truck with two axles towing a vehicle with a registered gross vehicle weight of more than 4,540 kilograms. Includes all vehicles in Classes 4 and 5. Minimum age: 18.
- Class 2: Permits the holder to operate buses with a seating capacity of over 24, and school buses with a seating capacity of over 36. Also permits the holder to operate vehicles in Classes 3, 4 and 5. Minimum age: 18.
- Class 1: Permits the holder to operate semi-trailer trucks. Also permits the holder to operate all motor vehicles or combinations of vehicles except motorcycles. Minimum age: 18.

=== New Brunswick ===
In 2017, all four Atlantic provinces (including New Brunswick) updated the driver's licence design to use a numbering scheme that resembles the European driving licence.

- Class 9 – Motor-driven cycle licence—authorizes the holder to drive a motor-driven cycle and a farm tractor. Minimum age: 14 (with parental consent)
- Class 8 – Farm tractor licence—authorizes the holder to drive a farm tractor only. Minimum age: 14 (with parental consent)
- Class 7 (Graduated Licence Program) Minimum age: 16 (with parental consent)
  - Level 1 – Learner's licence authorizes a person who is receiving instructions in the operation of a motor vehicle to drive a motor vehicle.
  - Level 2 – authorizes the holder to a Class 5 licence with the exception of: zero blood alcohol content, a maximum of four people in the vehicle (including driver) and may not drive between midnight and 5 a.m. (Exemptions made for work/education—must be accompanied by a Class 5 licensed driver with more than three years of driving experience.)

=== Newfoundland and Labrador ===
In Newfoundland and Labrador, one can apply for a learner's licence for Class 5 vehicles (passenger car or light truck) at the age of 16 and cannot obtain their licence until turning 17 (unless one is a graduate of a government-approved driving school program), as well as Class 6 vehicles (motorcycles). Upon completion and pass of a written knowledge test and a vision test, a Class 5 Level I licence will be issued. This licence, commonly referred to as a "learner's permit" restricts holders to one passenger in the vehicle who must be a licensee of no less than 4 years, a blood alcohol level of 0% and no driving between 12am and 5am. A "novice driver" sign must also be placed on the rear windshield. Parental consent is required for applicants under the age of 19.

After 12 months in Level I, or 8 months with the completion of a government-approved driving school program containing both classroom and in-car training, a road test can be taken to advance to Level II. Upon successful completion of the road test, one is advanced to Level II of the graduated licensing program. Level II lasts for 12 months and carries less restrictions than the initial stage. Passengers are permitted during the day but between 12am and 5am, the Level II driver must be accompanied by a licensed driver with 4 years driving experience and cannot have any other passengers in the vehicle. The drivers' blood alcohol content must remain at 0% in this stage.

After 12 months in Level II, the driver is automatically advanced to a full Class 5 licence (unless their licence was suspended in the learner's stage).

Newfoundland and Labrador uses a demerit point system. In two years, a driver can accumulate a maximum of 12 points, although in the novice stage, a maximum of 6 points can be accumulated.

The classes in Newfoundland and Labrador are as follows:

- Class 1 – permitted to operate semi-trailer trucks
- Class 2 – permitted to operate buses over 24 passengers
- Class 3 – permitted to operate trucks with 3 or more axles
- Class 4 – permitted to operate taxis, ambulances, all Class 5 motor vehicles and buses up to 24 passengers
- Class 5 – permitted to operate all motor vehicles with no more than 2 axles and combination of vehicles where the towed vehicle does not exceed 4500 kg. Buses, taxis and ambulances while not carrying passengers, self propelled motor homes with 2 or more axles, farm tractors, fork lifts and emergency vehicles excluding ambulances, trucks designed for off highway use and vehicles commonly known as backhoes. A minimum of 1 year with a class 5 licence is required before one can apply for a commercial class licence.
- Class 6 – permitted to operate motorcycles
- Class 7 (phased out) – former learner stage of classes 5, 6 and 8
- Class 8 – permitted to operate traction engine vehicles

=== Nova Scotia ===
- Age: one must be at least 16 years old, with the passing of a multiple choice road theory test and an eye vision test, a driving permit is issued which allows the learning driver to drive on roads accompanied by someone with full valid driver's licence whose blood alcohol content (BAC) is less than 0.05

The classes in Nova Scotia are as follows:

- Class 1 – semi-trailers and tractor-trailer combinations
- Class 2 – large buses seating more than 24 passengers
- Class 3 – vehicles or vehicle-trailer combinations weighing more than 14,000 kilograms
- Class 4 – smaller buses, vans seating fewer than 24 passengers for compensation, taxis, and ambulances
- Class 5 (most common) – cars, pick-up trucks, sport utility vehicles, and vans seating fewer than 24 passengers
- Class 6 – motorcycles and motor-driven cycles
- Class 7 – learner's licence for people learning to drive class 5 vehicles
- Class 8 – farm tractors

For Class 7 or 8 licences, the Learner's stage of the system lasts for twelve months, which may be reduced to nine months if a recognized driver education or training program is taken.

=== Ontario ===
==== Graduated Licensing System for Passenger Vehicles ====
- Learner's permit (G1): Available at the age of 16 with successful completion of a multiple-choice road theory test and an eye vision test. The G1 licence allows the learning driver to drive on roads accompanied by a full G licence driver with four years of driving experience whose blood alcohol content (BAC) is less than 0.05. Proof of four years' experience is indicated on a licence with four dots. The driver must not drive between midnight and 5 am, and must not drive with a BAC above zero. Furthermore, a G1 driver may not drive on any of the following unless accompanied by a licensed instructor:
  - 400-series highways with posted speeds of over 80 km/h.
  - Queen Elizabeth Way (QEW)
  - Don Valley Parkway
  - Gardiner Expressway in the Greater Toronto Area
  - E. C. Row Expressway in Windsor
  - Conestoga Parkway in Kitchener-Waterloo
- Probationary licence (G2): Available after having held a G1 licence for 1 year, or eight months if the driver has graduated from a ministry-approved driver education course. After successfully completing a basic road test, a G2 driver may drive without an accompanying driver at any time and on all Ontario roads and highways. The driver must still maintain a BAC of zero and restrict passengers to the number of working seatbelts. As of September 2005, teenage drivers with a G2 licence are restricted in the number of passengers under 19 that they can carry at night. Like the G1 licence, the G2 licence cannot be renewed, forcing progression towards a G licence.
- Full licence (G): After one year of driving with a G2 licence, a driver must take an additional road test that includes driving on a highway. With successful completion, they obtain a full licence, which carries no restrictions. No further tests are required until the age of 80, provided they renew their licence every five years. Drivers 21 and under must still have a BAC of zero, even with a full G licence. Drivers aged 22 and over are permitted to drive with a maximum of 0.08 BAC, though roadside suspensions may be enforced above 0.05 BAC. Drivers 80 and over must complete a vision and knowledge test and participate in a 90-minute group education session to renew their licence, every two years.

==== Graduated Licensing System for Motorcycles ====
- Class M1: Motorcycles, including a limited-speed motorcycle (motor scooter) and a motor-assisted bicycle (moped). Level 1 of graduated licensing. Holders may drive a motorcycle under certain conditions, which are: blood alcohol content (BAC) must be zero, riders can only ride during daylight hours (half an hour before sunrise to half an hour after sunset), cannot ride on any highway with speeds of greater than 80 km/h except Highways 11, 17, 61, 69, 71, 101, 102, 144 and 655 and no passengers. The M1 allows drivers to drive alone, unlike G1 (which requires an eligible person accompanying). Cannot be renewed.
- Class M2: Motorcycles, including a limited-speed motorcycle (motor scooter) and a motor-assisted bicycle (moped). Level 2 of graduated licensing. Holders may drive a motorcycle but only with a zero blood alcohol level. Holders may also drive a Class G vehicle under the conditions that apply to a class G1 licence holder. Cannot be renewed.
- Class M2 with Condition L: Limited-speed motorcycle (LSM) or moped only. Holders may also drive a Class G vehicle under the conditions that apply to a Class G1 licence holder. Cannot be renewed.
- Class M2 with Condition M: Three-wheeled motorcycles only. Holders may also drive a Class G vehicle under the conditions that apply to a Class G1 licence holder.
- Class M: Motorcycles, including a limited-speed motorcycle (motor scooter) and a motor-assisted bicycle (moped). Holders may also drive a Class G vehicle under the conditions that apply to a class G1 licence holder
- Class M with Condition L: Limited-speed motorcycle (LSM) or mopeds only. Limited-speed motorcycles are motorcycles with a maximum speed of 70 km/h. If manufactured after 1988 they are identified by a label on the vehicle that indicates it to be a "LSM/MVL". Holders may also drive a Class G vehicle under the conditions that apply to a Class G1 licence holder.
- Class M with Condition M: Three-wheeled motorcycles only. Holders may also drive a Class G vehicle under the conditions that apply to a Class G1 licence holder.

==== Additional Licensing Types for Ontario ====
- Class F: Short bus – maximum of 24 passenger capacity and ambulances. Can also operate vehicles in Class 'G'
- Class E: School purposes short bus – maximum of 24 passenger capacity. Can also operate vehicles in Class 'F' and 'G'
- Class D: Smaller truck or motor vehicle combination exceeding 11,000 kg provided the towed vehicle is not over 4,600 kg. Can also operate vehicles in Class 'G'
- Class C: Bus with designed seating capacity for more than 24 passengers. Can also operate vehicles in Class 'D', 'F' and 'G'
- Class B: School purposes bus with designed seating capacity for more than 24 passengers. Can also operate vehicles in Class 'C', 'D', 'E', 'F' and 'G'
- Class A with Condition R: Drivers with a restricted Class A licence condition would be prevented from operating a motor vehicle pulling double trailers or a motor vehicle pulling a trailer with air-brake. Can also operate vehicles in Class 'D' and 'G'
- Class A: Any tractor-trailer or combination of motor vehicle and towed vehicles where the towed vehicles exceed a total gross weight of 4,600 kilograms. Can also operate vehicles in Class 'A with Condition R', 'D' and 'G'

==== Licensing restrictions/endorsements ====
All licences in Ontario can carry any of the following restrictions/endorsements excluding some which are vehicle class specific. Some are related to health or to law enforcement penalty.

- Condition A: Special hand controls required
- Condition B: Special foot controls required
- Condition C: Special controls for hand and foot required
- Condition D: Hearing device required
- Condition E: Visual device required
- Condition F: Driver training conditions
- Condition G: Restricted class
- Condition I: Ignition interlock required
- Condition J: Special name/address requirements exist
- Condition K: Special controls required
- Condition L: Can only drive limited-speed motorcycles and motor assisted bicycle
- Condition M: May only drive motor-tricycle motorcycles
- Condition N: Hearing device required when operating Class A or D vehicle in United States
- Condition R: Class A vehicle restriction (cannot tow two trailers or a trailer equipped with air brakes)
- Condition S: For test use only
- Condition V: Valid for rehab evaluation only
- Condition W: Can only drive a commercial vehicle in Canada only
- Condition X: Must have corrective lenses
- Condition Z: Is required for operation of any and all vehicles equipped with air brakes.
- Condition 2(HC): Hand controls
- Condition +: Indicates more conditions/restrictions of lesser priority exist, requires system check.

Traffic violation convictions usually come with demerit points against a person's licence. While the demerit points have no official impact on insurance rates, most insurance providers will increase the rate charged to a driver in response to demerit points. The demerit points are used by the Ministry of Transportation to determine licence suspensions due to repeated traffic violations (effects on Ontario insurance rates and eligibility are typically measured by the number of tickets received in recent years, rather than the associated points).

Drivers from out of province must obtain an Ontario driver's licence if staying more than 90 days. New residents of Ontario may only apply after residing in the province for 60 days.

==== History ====
The first vehicle registration was required in Ontario in 1903, but a driver's licence with certified road test was not introduced until 1927. 1956 saw the introduction of a written test and then in 1959, demerit points were added to penalize licence holders.

Ontario has used a graduated licensing system since 1994. A driver can take as little as 20 months to get a full licence; however, a driver must have a full (G) licence within five years of obtaining a learner's permit (G1).

In 2006, Ontario passed legislation that would allow a court to suspend the licence of high school dropout until they turn 18. The act did not receive royal assent until December 2009, but is now in effect.

Starting June 2009, Ontario began issuing enhanced drivers licences (EDLs) as an option to residents upon request. These licences were visually almost identical to regular drivers licences, but had a machine readable code printed on the back of the card (visually similar to the same coding on a Canadian passport) and an embedded RFID microchip. These changes were made in response to the heightened security precautions at US land border crossings. The changes allowed for quicker procedures at a border crossing as well as a cheaper alternative to a passport ($40 vs. $100).

The enhanced driver's licence program has been discontinued.

=== Prince Edward Island ===
If a person is 16 years or older, they may apply for an instruction permit. A instruction permit allows a person to drive under supervision to receive instruction. This type of licence is valid for two years. Testing requirements for a driver's licence are a written or oral exam, road sign, driving, vision test and Novice Driving or Driver Education Course is required for first-time drivers. The classes of licence that can be obtained with appropriate training and required testing are:

- Class 1 – authorizes a person to drive any motor vehicle which the holder of a Class 3, 5, 8, and 9 may operate, any truck-tractor, any truck-tractor towing a semi-trailer, any truck-tractor towing a semi-trailer and a trailer;
- Class 2 – authorizes a person to drive any motor vehicle which the holder of a Class 3, 4, 5, 8 and 9 may operate, any bus with a capacity of more than 24 passengers, including a school bus.
- Class 3 – authorizes a person to drive any motor vehicle which the holder of a Class 5, 8, and 9 may operate, any motor vehicle exceeding 14,000 kg gross mass, but not including a truck-tractor towing a semi-trailer, any truck-trailer combination exceeding 14,000 kg gross mass, any truck tractor without a trailer, any special mobile equipment;
- Class 4 – authorizes a person to drive any motor vehicle which the holder of a Class 5, 8 and 9 may operate, any ambulance, any taxi, any bus with a capacity of fewer than 25 passengers;
- Class 5 – authorizes a person to drive any motor vehicle which the holder of a Class 8 and 9 may operate, any motor vehicle not exceeding 14,000 kg gross mass, except an ambulance, taxi, motorcycle, bus or a truck-tractor, any motor vehicle not exceeding 14,000 kg gross mass towing a vehicle which does not exceed the gross mass of 4,500 kg;
- Class 6 – authorizes a person to drive any motor vehicle which the holder of a Class 8 and 9 may operate any motorcycle;
- Class 7 – authorizes a person to drive a motor vehicle requiring a Class 5, 6 or 8 driver's licence without holding such a licence if the person is receiving instruction in the operation of the motor vehicle and is accompanied by another person who holds a valid driver's licence of the class required for the vehicle
- Class 8 – authorizes a person to drive any moped;
- Class 9 – authorizes a person to drive any farm tractor.

=== Quebec ===
- Farm Tractor (Class 8): Minimum age: 16.
- Moped or Motorized Scooter (class 6D): Minimum age: 14.
- Motorcycle (classes 6A, 6B and 6C): Minimum age: 16.
  - Classes:
    - Class 6A: all motorcycles
    - Class 6B: cylinder size of 400 cc or less
    - Class 6C: cylinder size of 125 cc or less
  - For all classes:
    - One must first obtain and hold a class 6R learner's licence for at least one month; allows motorcycle operation only for purposes of a driving course or an official closed track test.
    - Have held a class 6A learner's licence for at least 11 months and have passed the road test.
    - Have held a probationary licence (class 5) for 24 months, if one does not already hold a full class 5 licence.
- Probationary driver's licence (Class 5): Minimum age: 16.
  - Levels/steps of Class 5 licensing (comparable to a GLP):
    - Step 1: Register for a driving course at a driving school approved by the SAAQ/AQTR which includes both theory and practical lessons/instruction.
    - Step 2: Obtain a Class 5 learner's licence; must have passed Phase 1 of approved driving course (five theory modules). To obtain this licence one must pass a multiple choice road theory test. The permit issued allows the learning driver to drive on roads accompanied by someone with a full valid driver's licence. While driving, the learner must maintain a 0% blood alcohol content level and is limited to four demerit points, which when reached, incurs a three-month suspension and extension of the learning period by the same amount of time.
    - Step 3: Pass the knowledge/theory test; must have held a learner's licence for at least 10 months.
    - Step 4: Pass the road/practical test; must have successfully completed the above-mentioned driving course, have already passed the knowledge test and have held a Class 5 learner's licence for at least 12 months
    - Step 5: Obtain a probationary licence; must have passed the road test. Valid for 24 months after which time a person is eligible for a full Class 5 driver's licence.
  - Restrictions: Probationary licence holders must have fewer than four demerit points entered on their driving record and are prohibited from driving after drinking alcohol. In addition, they may not serve as an accompanying rider to assist a learner.
- Driver's licence (Class 5): Must have successfully completed the above steps and held a probationary driver's licence for 24 months. This licence allows a person to operate the following types of vehicles:
  - Passenger vehicle, or any double-axle truck or road tractor with a net mass of less than 4,500 kg.
  - Motor home
  - Tool vehicle: motor vehicle, other than a vehicle mounted on a truck chassis, in which the work station is contained within the driver's compartment (for the purposes of this definition, a truck chassis is a frame equipped with the combination of mechanical components required for a vehicle that is manufactured for the purpose of transporting people, goods or equipment)
  - Service vehicle: vehicle equipped to supply, repair or tow road vehicles;
  - Any vehicle covered by this class hauling a trailer or in the case of a motor home, another vehicle.
  - Vehicles covered under Classes 6D and 8
- Taxicab (Class 4C): Requirements:
  - Must have held a probationary Class 5 licence for a minimum of 12 months.
  - Understand, speak and read French
  - Pass a test on regulations governing transportation by taxi
- Small Bus or Minibus [fewer than 25 passengers] (Class 4B):
  - Must have one year of experience with a Class 5 licence.
  - School Minibus: An additional "certificate of competence" is required.
- Emergency Vehicle (Class 4A). Applicant must have a least one of the following:
  - Have two years' experience under a probationary licence or class 5 driver's licence,
  - Currently hold a probationary licence or Class 5 driver's licence and have passed an emergency vehicle driving course recognized by the SAAQ
- Straight-Body Truck (Class 3): Requirements:
  - Must have 24 months' cumulative Class 5 experience
  - Must have fewer than four demerit points on record
  - Not have had licence suspended or revoked during the previous two years as the result of accumulating demerit points or a driving-related Criminal Code offence
  - Pass the SAAQ's vision test;
  - Submit a satisfactory medical report;
  - Pass the knowledge test
  - Pass both road tests: pre-trip inspection test and heavy vehicle road test

During the learning period the applicant must have held a Class 3 learner's licence for three months or for one month if the applicant is aged 25 or over; or has 60 months' cumulative experience as a holder of a Class 5 licence.

  - Endorsements involve air brake system (F endorsement) and manual transmission (M endorsement)
- Bus (Class 2) [Seating capacity of more than 24 passengers]: Requirements:
  - Must have 24 months' cumulative Class 5 experience
  - Must have fewer than four demerit points on record
  - Not have had licence suspended or revoked during the previous two years as the result of accumulating demerit points or a driving-related Criminal Code offence
  - Pass the SAAQ's vision test;
  - Submit a satisfactory medical report;
  - Pass the knowledge test
  - Pass both road tests: pre-trip inspection test and heavy vehicle road test

During the Learning period the applicant must have held a Class 2 learner's licence for three months or for one month if aged 25 or over; or has 60 months' cumulative experience as a holder of a Class 5 licence. An applicant who meets one of these three requirements, the one-month period may be substituted by a training program that includes at least 20 driving hours on public roadways with a vehicle covered by a Class 2 licence. An additional 'certificate of competence' is required in the case of a school bus, and there are endorsements for air brake system (F endorsement) and manual transmission (M endorsement)

- Heavy Vehicle Combination (Class 1): Requirements:
  - Must have 36 months' cumulative experience as a holder of a Class 5 licence or
  - 24 months' cumulative experience if he or she has completed the following training:
    - the truck driving training program which leads to the Diploma of Vocational Studies issued by the Ministère de l'Éducation, du Loisir et du Sport; or
    - a 300-hour driving course on the public roadway for heavy vehicles covered by class 1.
  - Must have fewer than four demerit points on record
  - Not have had licence suspended or revoked during the previous two years as the result of accumulating demerit points or a driving-related Criminal Code offence
  - Pass the SAAQ's vision test;
  - Submit a satisfactory medical report;
  - Pass the knowledge test
  - Pass both road tests: pre-trip inspection test and heavy vehicle road test

During the learning period the applicant must have held a class 1 learner's licence for three months or for one month if the applicant is aged 25 or over; or has 60 months' cumulative experience as a holder of a class 5 licence; or is registered in the truck driving training program which leads to the Diploma of Vocational Studies issued by the Ministère de l'Éducation, du Loisir et du Sport and has successfully completed all mandatory sections of the program required to drive on the road without an accompanying rider; or already has a class 2 or 3 driver's licence.

  - Endorsements involve air brake system (F endorsement) and manual transmission (M endorsement)
  - Quebec is the only province which does not suspend driver's licences as a child support enforcement measure.

=== Saskatchewan ===
==== Classes ====
- Class 1 – power units and semi-trailers, and trucks (except two-axle trucks with farm-class plates) that have a trailer(s) or vehicle(s) in tow where the gross weight of the towed unit(s) exceeds 4,600 kg. Motor vehicles in classes 2, 3, 4 and 5.
- Class 2 – buses having a seating capacity in excess of 24 passengers while carrying a passenger or passengers. Motor vehicles in classes 3, 4 and 5. Class 1 vehicles as a learner with an appropriate endorsement.
- Class 3 – trucks with more than two axles (except those with farm-class plates) and trucks with more than two axles that have a trailer(s) or vehicle(s) in tow, where the gross weight of the towed units does not exceed 4,600 kg. Motor vehicles in classes 4 and 5. Class 1 or 2 vehicles as a learner with an appropriate endorsement.
- Class 4 – taxis (must also have a Certificate of Approval and a Certificate of Good Moral Character), ambulances and buses having a seating capacity of 24 or fewer passengers while carrying passengers. Motor vehicles in class 5. Class 1, 2 or 3 vehicles as a learner with appropriate endorsement.
- Class 5 – cars, vans, two-axle vehicles having a trailer(s) or vehicle(s) in tow where the gross weight of the towed vehicle(s) does not exceed 4,600 kg, buses when not transporting passengers, three-axle motorhomes, taxis and ambulances when not used for hire. Two-axle farm trucks towing any vehicle. Trucks with more than two axles registered in the farm class. Trucks with more than two axles registered in the farm class when towing vehicle(s) where the weight of the towed vehicle(s) does not exceed 4,600 kg. Class 1, 2, 3 or 4 vehicles as a learner with appropriate endorsement (minimum age 18 and not a novice driver). Vehicles registered in Class PB or PC when used exclusively to transport, for hire, not more than 24 passengers with a disability and any attendants to those passengers.
- Class 7 – Class 5 vehicles as a learner. Motorcycles under certain circumstances with appropriate endorsement (minimum age 16).

==== Endorsements ====
- Air brakes "A"
- Detailed Endorsement "G" (heavy trailer, northern above 55th parallel, and well service rigs)
- 6 endorsement (motorcycle learners)
- Motorcycle "M" (full licence, 16 years of age)
- School bus "S" (full licence, if applying for a school bus endorsement card, one must be at least 18 years of age and cannot be a novice driver)
- Learners "1", "2", "3", "4", "6", "7"
- Snowmobile and ATV (all-terrain vehicle – must be at least 16 years old, or if younger than 16 years old, must be supervised)

===== Class 5 – Novice 1 (6 months) =====
- 16 years of age
- Pass Class 5 road test
- Excludes interruptions (non-renewal, refusal, licence suspension)

===== Class 5 – Novice 2 (12 months) =====
- Completed Novice 1
- Excludes interruptions (non-renewal, refusal, licence suspension)
- Free of at-fault collision, traffic conviction and licence suspension

===== 6 Endorsement – Motorcycle learner =====
- Must have a Class 1, 2, 3, 4, 5 or 7 licence.
- Pass the required supplementary knowledge tests.
- File a medical report if requested.
- Be at least 16 years of age.
- May not operate a motorcycle from half an hour after sunset until half an hour before sunrise.
- May not carry passengers.

===== Class 7 – Learner (9 months) =====
- 16 years of age (15 years of age high school program)
- Pass written test
- Excludes interruptions (non-renewal, refusal, licence suspension)
- Mandatory education – high school training (30 hours in-class, six hours in-car) or commercial training (six hours in-class, six hours in-car)

== Department of National Defence ==
The Department of National Defence issues a special driving licence known as DND 404 to Canadian Forces military personnel driving CF vehicles or vehicles rented by DND, and the issue is contingent on possession of a provincial driving licence and passing of a DND Safe Driving Course (SDC). Between 2011 and 2012, all DND 404 permits were replaced with modern photo ID cards. Provincial law enforcement agencies do enforce highway traffic laws against such permit holders, and DND 404 permits can be accordingly suspended.

== Specimen Images ==
Province	Front	Reverse	Latest version
Alberta	Link to image	N/A	2026
British Columbia	Link to image		
Manitoba	Link to image	N/A	
New Brunswick	Link to image	N/A	2017
Newfoundland and Labrador	Link to image	N/A	
Northwest Territories	Link to PDF with images		
Nova Scotia	Link to image	N/A	
Nunavut	Link to PDF with images		2009
Ontario	Link to image	N/A	
Prince Edward Island	Link to image	Link to image	2017
Saskatchewan	Link to image	N/A	2016-04-01
(Quebec) Québec	Link to PDF with image		2015-08-24
Yukon	Link to image	N/A	2024
(Canada) DND 404	Link to image	N/A	

== Licence suspensions and revocations ==
Although licence suspensions and revocations are generally a matter for the territorial and provincial government departments of motor vehicles, some driving offences (e.g. dangerous driving and impaired driving) are criminal offences, set down in Canada's Criminal Code. Prison sentences are often given to repeat offenders and to drivers convicted of causing death or grievous bodily harm via Criminal Code driving offences.
