= Convention on Road Traffic =

Convention on Road Traffic may refer to:

- Geneva Convention on Road Traffic, 1949
- Vienna Convention on Road Traffic, 1968
