= Driving licence in Pakistan =

Driving licence in Pakistan اجازت نامہ رانندگی
- Type: Driving licence
- Issued by: Individual district, province, territory or federal government
- First issued: 1947
- Purpose: Authorisation
- Valid in: Pakistan

In Pakistan, the driving licence is the official document which authorises its holder to operate various types of motor vehicles (depending on the type of licence) on publicly accessible roads. Driving licences are issued to drivers by each individual district, province or territory in which the driver is residing. Thus, specific regulations relating to driving licences vary depending on the jurisdiction and province to province, though overall they are quite similar. All provinces and territories within Pakistan mutually recognizes driving licences from other provinces and territories for identification and driving status.

== Content ==
Each of the data fields on Pakistani licences are labelled with the following data.

- Surname of the bearer
- Name of the bearer
- Date of birth
- a) Date of issue, b) Date of expiry, c) Place of issue
- Licence number
- Photograph of holder
- Signature of holder
- Place of residence of the bearer
- Licence categories
- Sex / Gender
- Space reserved for additional information

== Requirements for Pakistani citizens ==
The applicant must show their National Identity Card and proof of residence of the area in which a candidate is applying and must be able to read a car number plate from a distance of 20.5 metres (67.2 ft).

For a new licence the person usually needs to apply first for a learner's permit. In order to get a licence, applicant must fulfill these requirements:

- The candidate needs to come to the office, in person.
- The candidate needs to show a valid CNIC (Computerised National Identity Card)
- The candidate can only apply in the district of their domicile (In case of the out district, permission may be granted from the concerned MLA/DPO in advance).
- Paste a ticket of Rs. 60 for each driving licence category.
- Medical form duly signed from the authorised medical practitioner

After fulfilling the medical tests the applicant is eligible for getting the computerised learner's permit. The learner's permit is valid for six months normally. And after that the driver is eligible for a computerised driving licence. In this six months time candidates have to pass through a series of tests. Phase 1 requires candidates to pass a computerised written test, followed by a road signs test. The computerised test is usually a multiple-choice test on various traffic rules. If the candidate fails in any of the phase 1 tests, then the candidate shall retry phase 1 after a gap of 42 days. Passing requires at least 50% correct answers. After Phase 1, Phase 2 is a practical test in which the candidate is tested to drive in narrow spaces, and park in a narrow space. If during the test, the candidate's car touches any of the cones, then a retest can take place after 42 days. After successfully passing the test the driver can get the computerised driving licence which is valid for 3 years or 5 years.

== Minimum age ==
The minimum age varies for cars to large buses. Depending on the type of vehicle the right for driving vehicles on Pakistani roads is allowed to:

Punjab

- Learner's permit (Learner License): Available at the age of 16, with the passing of a multiple choice road theory test, a driving permit is issued which allows the learning driver to drive on roads. The exact same process, except with other restrictions, is used for obtaining a motorcycle licence.

The minimum age for applying for a permanent Motorcar driving licence is 18 years of age. For paid drivers, it is 20 years of age. A permanent driving licence is valid throughout Pakistan.

== Driving licence categories ==
The driving licence categories in Pakistan are as follows:

Category (subcategory)	Description
Motorcar/jeep	Driving licences are not valid for commercial transport
Motorbike	Can only drive motorcycles, motor assisted bicycles and drive motor-tricycle motorcycles
LTV	Light transport vehicle driving licences are valid for commercial car/taxi, jeep, mini bus and lightweight transport
HTV	Heavy transport vehicle driving licences are valid for buses, trucks, trailers, cranes, and any type of heavy transport
Tractor	(agricultural)
PSV	Public Service Vehicle
International driver's permit	Translation of a domestic driving licence that allows the holder to drive a private motor vehicle

== Modern driving licences ==
The National Database & Registration Authority has developed an RFID-based driving licence that bears a license holder's unique, personal information as well as stores data regarding traffic violations and tickets issued. Data is stored in two halves of the chip. One half contains the personal information of the licence holder and cannot be changed or modified. The second half is rewritable, where history of violations can be recorded. Violation data is transferred from the policeman's handheld device to the local police station which is then transferred to the central server (at district/ provincial level) through a secure channel that ensures data security and integrity. The e-Driver's Licence system has been developed to automatically revoke driving rights in case of repeated traffic violations. The e-driver's licence also allows the authorities to provide for supplementary provisions and services. The RFID driver's licence enables improvements in identity verification, and privacy protection. If a person has a driving licence in Pakistan, they can verify the status of their licence through their licence authority website of their individual district, province or territory. They have to put their CNIC number into the system.

== Regulations ==
- 1 – Learner's driving permit of motorcycle / motorcar / LTV / HTV / PSV / tractor (agriculture) shall be valid for six months, however the applicant can appear for practical driving test after 42 days
- 2 – Learner's driving permit of construction / agriculture machinery shall be valid for one year, however the applicant can appear for the practical driving test after six months
- 3 – Foreigners' Driving Licences shall be valid for the duration of their Pakistani visa
- 4 – International Driving Permits shall be valid for one year
- 5 – All other categories of Driving Licences issued under these Rules other than PSV licences shall be valid for 5 years
- 6 – PSV Licences shall be valid for three years unless otherwise provided in these Rules, cancelled/suspended by the Authority or a competent Court earlier

== Driving licence renewal ==
Driving licences in Pakistan are usually issued for 5 years. After 5 years, a licensee must renew their driving licence for further 5 years. For this purpose, a licensee should visit their nearest driving licence office with the required documents. The following documents are required to submit.

- Filled application form
- 2 passport size photographs
- A CNIC (computerised national identity card) copy
- Current driving licence before the expiry date (or expired)
- Required tickets of relevant licence

After completing the process, the licence is posted to the address mentioned in the application form.

== See also ==
- Computerised National Identity Card
- Pakistani passport
- Vienna Convention on Road Traffic
- International Driving Permit
