= Pakistan Automated Fingerprint Identification System =

Pakistani biometric identification system

- Original author(s): National Database and Registration Authority (NADRA)
- Type: Biometric identification system

The Pakistan Automated Fingerprint Identification System (PAFIS) is a biometric identification system used by law enforcement agencies in Pakistan to identify and track criminals and suspects. PAFIS was developed by the National Database and Registration Authority (NADRA) in collaboration with the Federal Investigation Agency (FIA) and other law enforcement agencies.

PAFIS uses advanced fingerprint recognition technology to scan and match fingerprints of individuals against a central database of known criminals and suspects. The system can also search for partial or distorted fingerprints and can store data on palm prints and footprints as well.

PAFIS has been used in a number of high-profile criminal investigations in Pakistan, including terrorist attacks and kidnappings. It has also been used to identify missing persons and to track down individuals who have gone missing or are wanted for criminal offenses.
