= Munir Afsar =

Pakistan military officer

Muhammad Munir Afsar
- محمد منیر افسر

Chairman of the National Database and Registration Authority
- Incumbent
- Assumed office 2 October 2023
- Preceded by: Tariq Malik

Inspector General Frontier Corps Khyber Pakhtunkhwa (South)
- In office October 2021 – October 2022

Personal details
- Born: Pakistan
- Education: Government College Lahore; Pakistan Military Academy; Command and Staff College, Quetta; National Defence University (Pakistan); National University of Sciences and Technology; US Army National War College
- Awards: Hilal-i-Imtiaz (Military)

Military service
- Allegiance: Pakistan
- Branch/service: Pakistan Army
- Years of service: 1990 — present
- Rank: Lieutenant General
- Unit: 39 Punjab Regiment
- Commands: Inspector General Communication & Information Technology; Inspector General Frontier Corps Khyber Pakhtunkhwa (South); Commander, Pakistan Army Cyber Command

Muhammad Munir Afsar, HI(M) is a three-star general in the Pakistan Army who currently serves as the Chairman of the National Database and Registration Authority (NADRA).

== Education ==
Afsar completed his MPhil in Public Policy and National Security Management. He also did MS in GIS and remote sensing and MS in National Resource Strategy from NDU Washington. Currently, he is doing PhD in Remote Sensing at NUST Islamabad.

== Military career ==
Afsar was commissioned into the Pakistan Army in 1990 through the 81st Long Course and joined the 39 Punjab Regiment (Jaanisar).

Afsar has served at various capacities throughout his military career. As a major general, he served as Director General of the Command, Control, Communication, Computers, and Intelligence Directorate. He was later appointed as Inspector General Frontier Corps Khyber Pakhtunkhwa (South). In 2022, he was promoted to the rank of Lieutenant General.

Munir had led the Pakistan Army Cyber Command. He also served as Inspector General Communication and Technology before being appointed as Chairman Nadra.

== Chairman of NADRA ==
On 2 October 2023, Afsar was appointed as Chairman of NADRA by the caretaker federal government. He became the first serving military officer to hold the position.

In September 2024, a single bench of the Lahore High Court annulled his appointment. However, in February 2025, a two-member division bench reinstated him.
