= National Reconstruction Bureau =

Economic recovery institute in Pakistan

National Reconstruction Bureau NRB

Agency overview
- Formed: 8 November 1999; 26 years ago
- Preceding agency: Ministry of Frontier Space
- Dissolved: May 2011; 15 years ago
- Jurisdiction: Constitution of Pakistan
- Headquarters: Islamabad, Pakistan
- Agency executive: Dr. Asim Hussain, Chairman
- Website: www.nrb.gov.pk (offline)

The National Reconstruction Bureau (Reporting name: NRB) of Pakistan was an independent and constitutionally established federal institution tasked with economic recovery and prosperous development through the local government system. It was dissolved in May 2011.

== Overview ==
The NRB formulated public policy matters for the development of local economic independence, local government system evaluation and generate fundamental thought on promoting good governance to strengthen democracy through the reconstruction of institutions of state related to all aspects of governance and social welfare.

The institution was headed by its chairman and reported directly to the Prime Minister of Pakistan on a yearly basis. Established on 18 November 1999, its primary mission was to formulate public-level national policy for the nationwide reconstruction, economic development and recovery all over the nation.

This Organization now stands defunct by the Government of Pakistan and merged with Prime Minister's Secretariat as Policy Implementation Wing.

== History ==
=== Background ===
During the 1980-1990s, the country had seen a rapid rise of the illegal immigration from Afghanistan, Eastern Europe, Iran, Bangladesh, Burma, and other countries. The outcomes of the civil war in Afghanistan had damaged the planned cities of the FATA region in Khyber-Pakhtunkhwa Province. The war torn areas in Western Pakistan, the unplanned and illegal housing caused major disturbances in planned traffic systems and cities. In 1999, President Pervez Musharraf took the recommendation from Pakistan Army and his government to established the National Reconstruction Bureau (NRB) for quick economic recovery and development in war-torn areas.

=== Negotiations and consensus ===
The proposal was pushed forward by Pakistan Army when Lieutenant-General Tanveer Naqvi presented the plan at the cabinet-level meeting in Islamabad. General Naqvi suggested to President Musharraf that the "Police should be under the control of district mayors who would be an elected person and accountable before the district assembly." However, Interior Minister Lieutenant-General Moinuddin Haider objected the plan and differed with him as he insisted to the proposal that the proposed police safety commission which would also have public representation.

The massive commutative political alliance, ARD, led by Benazir Bhutto rejected the whole plan, as she termed it as "not workable". Its senior leader, Nasrullah Khan took punitive approach, pressing for quick elections, revival of assemblies rather than an acceleration in economic rehabilitation, demanding unconditional fulfilment of all prior reparation claims, and pressing for progress toward nationwide socioeconomic transformation. The ARD noted that devolution plan, given by the National Reconstruction Bureau (NRB), was "neither workable nor practically possible". The ARD demanded that any restructuring of the system should be left to the elected representatives. The ARD alliance was divided when half of the political parties rejected the NRB plan for reconstruction while other half showed its support to NRB and admitted that the "new system is better than the one which had been given by the National Reconstruction Bureau."

On 6 August 2000, over three dozen parties which took part in the all-party conference had rejected the NRB plan. While other three dozen parties marked the NRB's proposal as "it was better was "practicable." Meanwhile, President Musharraf reconcile the matter between Interior ministry and NRB at the high level meeting over the economic recovery plans.

=== National Reconstruction Bureau ===
The Bureau was established on 18 November 1999 with the mission to formulate policy for national reconstruction. It is a focal organisation to generate fundamental thoughts on promoting good governance to strengthen democracy through reconstruction of institutions of State. The National Reconstruction Bureau formulated recommendations for reconstruction of Local Governments and the Police. Local Government Ordinance, 2001 was promulgated by the provincial governments in August 2001. The Police Order, 2002 was promulgated on 14 August 2002 which replaced the Police Act, 1861. The Devolution Plan and Local Government Ordinances brought about a wholesale transformation in Pakistan's system of government, especially at the local level. Divisions were abolished, and instead a three-tier local government structure comprising three categories of local government – districts, tehsils and unions – was brought in.

This meant the decentralisation of many functions previously handled by the provincial governments to the districts and tehsils. Alongside administrative and political decentralisation, provisions have been made for transfer of funds to the local governments so they can carry out their planning and development functions effectively.

== Termination ==
The National Reconstruction Bureau was dissolved by the government in May 2011.
