= Sabawoon Rehabilitation Centre =

- Mingora; Swat, Khyber Pakhtunkhwa; Pakistan

Information
- School type: Rehabilitation Centre
- Established: September 2009
- Staff: 35

Sabawoon Rehabilitation Centre is a rehabilitation institute in Mingora, Swat, Pakistan. Sabawoon in Pashto means Morning Light. The centre, run and established by Pakistan Army with the help of the Hum Pakistani Foundation (an NGO) and UNICEF, was inaugurated in 2009 by General Ashfaq Pervez Kayani. Initially 22 former militants were inducted into the institute in September 2009.

== Background ==
The Swat valley witnessed militancy during the years 2007-2009. In 2007 Pakistan Army curbed it to some extent but after general election in 2008 the new provincial government of Khyber Pakhtunkhwa signed agreements with the militants and asked army to withdraw. In 2009 when militants again challenged the writ of government, and provincial governments failed, the army was again called in. The army launched Operation Rahe-e-Rast in 2009 to curtail militancy in the region and apprehended a number of militants. Before the operation, the militants used to collected money from the people of valley. Those who couldn't give money had to surrender their children, some of whom were used as suicide bombers after brainwashing them.

== Objective ==
Sabawoon was set up for the recuperation of militants (mostly juvenile) apprehended during Operation Rah-e-Rast so they can be helpful to the society in a fruitful manner. The objective of the institute is to de-radicalize youngsters who were indoctrinated by the militants. Militants after indoctrinating them used them for suicide bombing and fighting against the government institutions. Students are provided all basic necessities of life and a healthy environment. Muhammad Farooq Khan, a religious scholar, observed that most of the young militants and suicide bombers captured during the military operation were teenagers and belonged to poor families.

== Academics ==
As of 2010, 34% children inducted into the institute are turned in by their parents, 39% are apprehended by the security force while 25% surrendered themselves. Local residents also have the opportunity to point out children they believe are militants and should be arrested. The children are divided in three group: High-risk, Medium-risk and Low-risk based on the degree of indoctrination they received while among militants. Students are to remain inside the campus during the training, while their parents are allowed to meet them, once in two weeks.

Studies are divided in modules, that include regular education up to secondary level, technical education and de-radicalization education. The participants are also taught about ethics, patriotism and Islam's true meaning.
