= National Database and Registration Authority =

Government agency of Pakistan that regulates government databases

National Database & Registration Authority
- اداره قومی ڈیٹا بیس و اندراج

Agency overview
- Formed: 10 March 2000; 26 years ago
- Jurisdiction: Constitution of Pakistan
- Headquarters: State Bank of Pakistan Building, Sector G-5/2, Islamabad-44000, Pakistan; 33.7215°N 73.0955°E
- Motto: Empowerment through Identity
- Employees: 24,000+
- Agency executive: Lt General Muhammad Munir Afsar, Chairman
- Parent department: Ministry of Interior
- Website: www.nadra.gov.pk

National Database & Registration Authority (NADRA; Urdu: اداره قومی ڈیٹا بیس و اندراج) is an independent and autonomous agency under the control of the Ministry of Interior Pakistan that regulates government databases and statistically manages the sensitive registration database of all the National Citizens of Pakistan. Lieutenant General Muhammad Munir Afsar is serving as the Chairman since 2 October 2023.

NADRA is also responsible for issuing Computerised National Identity Cards to the citizens of Pakistan as well as National Identity Card for Overseas Pakistanis and Pakistan Origin Card for people with Pakistani Origin who do not qualify for maintaining CNIC or NICOP. NADRA employs more than 24,000 people in more than 963 domestic offices and ten international offices.

== Legal Basis and Establishment ==
NADRA was established under the National Database and Registration Authority Ordinance 2000 (Ordinance No. VIII of 2000), which was promulgated on 10 March 2000. The Ordinance repealed the National Registration Act 1973 and transferred the functions of the earlier registration bodies to the new authority.

== History ==
The National Database and Registration Authority (NADRA) was established on 10 March 2000 through the National Database and Registration Authority Ordinance, 2000 (Ordinance No. VIII of 2000), which merged the National Database Organisation, a department created under the Ministry of Interior after the 1998 national census, with the Directorate General of Registration, a body that had operated under the National Registration Act, 1973. The new Authority was created as an independent corporate body with the mandate to replace the old manual registration system with a computerised one and to build a national citizen database. The launch of the Computerised National Identity Card (CNIC) in 2001 marked the transition from manual registration to a digital citizen registry, and in October 2012 NADRA introduced the Smart National Identity Card, an electronic chip based card with enhanced security features. NADRA later launched Pak Identity, an online service that allows citizens in Pakistan and abroad to apply for identity documents remotely. Over the years its role expanded to include support for electoral rolls, and by 2012 it had removed roughly 37 million invalid entries from the voters list and added more than 36 million newly eligible adults. The authority has also administered biometric based smart card programmes for disaster relief and financial inclusion schemes, and has been internationally recognised for its identification expertise, including work on the inclusion of underregistered groups such as tribal communities, transgender persons, and women. NADRA today maintains one of the largest citizen databases in the world.

== Computerised National Identity Card ==
The CNIC is a computerised national identity card issued by NADRA. As of 2025, more than 225 million CNICs had been issued.

The CNIC is issued first at the age of 18. However, for Pakistani citizens, the CNIC is mandatory for:

- Voting
- Opening and operating bank accounts
- Obtaining a passport
- Obtaining a domicile certificate
- Purchasing vehicles and land
- Obtaining a driver license
- Purchasing a plane, train, or inter-city bus ticket
- Obtaining a mobile phone SIM card
- Obtaining an electricity, landline telephone, natural gas, or water and sewerage connection
- Securing admission to college and other post-graduate institutes
- Conducting major financial transactions
- Setting up a business
- Registering a marriage or divorce
- Opening a PO Box
- Sending a packet or parcel via courier services

Thus, it can be seen as a de facto necessity for meaningful civic life in Pakistan.

== The Identity Card Number ==
Each citizen is assigned a unique 13-digit number. A child first receives this number at birth when the parents complete the child registration form, known as the B Form or Child Registration Certificate. The same number is later carried on the National Identity Card issued at the age of 18.

== Requirements ==
In Pakistan, all adult citizens must register for the Computerised National Identity Card (CNIC) with a unique number upon reaching the age of 18. It serves as an identification document to authenticate an individual's identity as the citizen of Pakistan. Before introduction of the CNIC, manual National Identity Cards (NICs) were issued to citizens of Pakistan. Today, the Government has shifted all its existing records of National Identity Cards (NIC) to the central computerised database managed by NADRA.

== Information Shown on the Card ==
The card displays the legal name, gender (male, female, or transgender), the father's name or the husband's name for a married woman, an identification mark, date of birth, the identity card number, the family number, current address, permanent address, date of issue, date of expiry, signature, photograph, and a fingerprint. NADRA also records the holder's religion, though this information is not printed on the card itself.

Citizens can apply for an identity card by visiting a NADRA Registration Centre or by applying online through the Pak Identity portal. The online application process extends to overseas Pakistanis, allowing them to apply and have cards delivered by mail. NADRA has also extended online application services to documents such as the National Identity Card for Overseas Pakistanis, the Pakistan Origin Card, and the Child Registration Certificate.

== Application for National Identity Card ==
Applicants can obtain a national identity card either by visiting a nearby NADRA office or by applying online. The online portal is particularly beneficial for Pakistani expatriate.

== Certificate and Letter of Adminstration ==
From June 2021, NADRA began issuing succession certificates and letters of administration, initially in Karachi and subsequently expanding to other regions.

== Registration Centres ==
NADRA operates registration centres across Pakistan, including standard centres and larger mega centres in major cities such as Karachi, which serve substantial populations.

== Database Integrity ==
NADRA identifies and blocks identity cards that are found to be fraudulent or invalid. In 2012, NADRA reported that it had removed a significant number of invalid entries from the electoral rolls and added many newly eligible adults to the rolls, strengthening the integrity of the electoral database.

== Achievements ==
- Top 50 e-Passport Technology Suppliers for 9 consecutive years in ID World Magazine, for 2005, 2006, 2007, 2008, 2009, 2010, 2011, 2012 and 2013.
- "Outstanding Achievement Award" at CARDEX Middle East in Cairo, Egypt in May, 2007.
- The Merit Exporter Award by Federation of Pakistan Chambers of Commerce & Industry (FPCCI) in 2006.
- NADRA's Chief Technology Officer, Mr. Usman Y. Mobin was awarded the "ID Talent Award" in November 2007 at the ID World International Congress held in Milan, Italy. He was recently awarded Tamgha-e-Imtiaz in 2009 for his services rendered to the State.
- Successfully achieved Capability Maturity Model Integration (CMMI) from Software Engineering Institute (SEI) Carnegie Mellon, USA.
- NADRA Quality Management and CNIC Production departments are also ISO 9001:2000 Certified.
- Deputy Chairman NADRA, Tariq Malik was awarded ID Outstanding Achievement Award on 3 November 2009, in Milan at an exclusive ceremony during the eighth ID WORLD International Congress, the Global Summit on Automatic Identification.
- NADRA also tracks cases of fake identities through its system. When spotted and identified as fake identities, NADRA takes action by blocking those national identity cards.
- By 2012, NADRA had cleaned up Pakistan's Voters List by removing approximately 37 Million "fake" voters from this list and adding more than 36 million new adults to the list.

== See also ==
- Federal Board of Revenue
- Pakistan Bureau of Statistics
