= International Driving Permit =

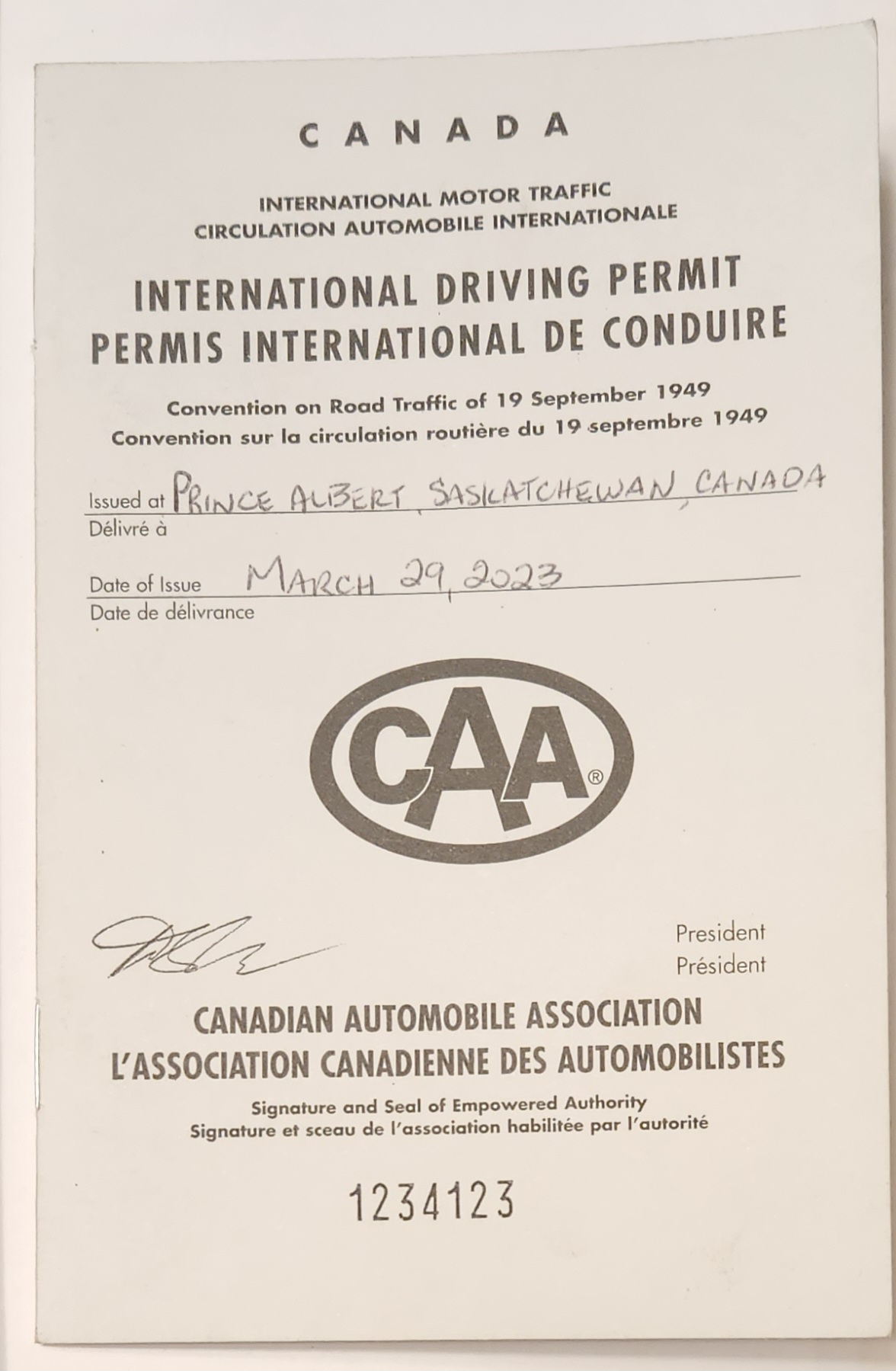
Front cover of a Canadian International Driving Permit issued by the Canadian Automobile Association on 29 March 2023 in Prince Albert, Saskatchewan

An International Driving Permit (IDP; sometimes also referred to as international driving licence) is a translation of a domestic driving licence that allows the holder to drive a private motor vehicle in any country or jurisdiction that recognizes the document. The term International Driving Permit was first mentioned in the document prescribed in the International Convention relative to Motor Traffic that was signed at Paris in 1926, and is a translation of the French "permis de conduire international", or "international driving licence". The Paris treaty, and all subsequent, use the word "permit" exclusively in relation to all kinds of driving licence.

International Driving Permits are governed by three international conventions: the 1926 Paris International Convention relative to Motor Traffic, the 1949 Geneva Convention on Road Traffic, and the 1968 Vienna Convention on Road Traffic. When a state is contracted to more than one convention, the newest one terminates and replaces previous ones.

The IDP, whose A6 size (148 mm × 105 mm or 5.8 in × 4.1 in) is slightly larger than a passport, has a grey cover and white inside pages. The outside and inside of the front cover shall be printed in (at least one of) the national language(s) of the issuing State. The last two inside pages shall be printed in French, and pages preceding those two pages shall repeat the first of them in several languages, which must include English, Russian and Spanish. IDPs are issued by a national government directly, or through a network of organizations or by any association duly empowered thereto by such other Contracting Party. For the latter case those issuing organizations are mostly automobile associations, such as American Automobile Association in the United States, Norwegian Automobile Federation in Norway and Riksförbundet M Sverige in Sweden. As there are many unofficial sellers on the internet, the AIT/FIA has created an approved directory to all IDP issuing organizations in the world.

To be valid, the IDP must be accompanied by a valid driving licence issued in the applicant's country of residence. An IDP is not required if the driver's domestic licence meets the requirements of the 1968 convention; the domestic licence can be used directly in a foreign jurisdiction that is a party to that convention. In addition, other arrangements eliminates the need of an IDP in some countries, such as the European driving licence valid within the European Economic Area (EEA) as well as member states of the Association of Southeast Asian Nations (ASEAN) with each other.

== Driver information ==
=== 1968 convention (as amended in 2011) ===
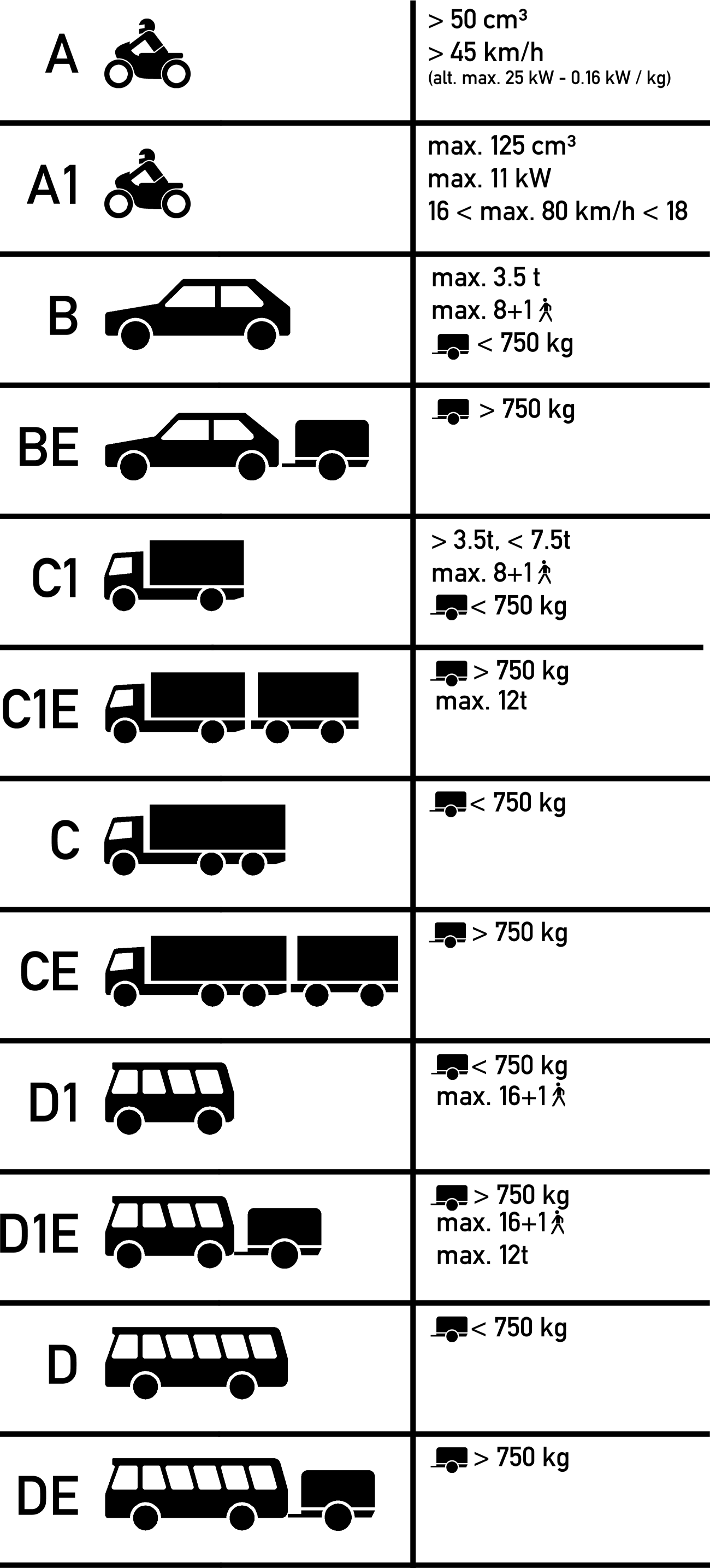

The convention has been ratified by 83 countries/jurisdictions.

The main regulations about driving licences are in Annex 6 (domestic driving permit) and Annex 7 (International Driving Permit). The currently active version of those is in force in each contracting party since no later than 29 March 2011 (Article 43). According to the 1968 Vienna Convention, an IDP must have an expiration date of no more than three years from its issue date or until the expiration date of national driving permit, whichever is earlier, and it is valid for a period of one year upon the arrival in the foreign country.

Article 41 of the convention describes requirements for driving licences. Key of those are:

- every driver of a motor vehicle must hold a driving licence;
- driving permits can be issued only after passing theoretical and practical exams, which are regulated by each country or jurisdiction;
- Contracting parties shall recognize as valid for driving in their territories:
  - domestic driving permit conforming to the provisions of annex 6 to the convention;
  - International Driving Permit conforms to the provisions of annex 7 to the convention, on condition that it is presented with the corresponding domestic driving permit;
- driving permits issued by a contracting party shall be recognized in the territory of another contracting party until this territory becomes the place of normal residence of their holder;
- all of the above does not apply to learner-driver licences;
- the period of validity of an international driving permit shall be either no more than three years after the date of issue or until the date of expiry of the domestic driving licence, whichever is earlier;
- Contracting parties may refuse to recognize the validity of driving licences for persons under eighteen or, for categories C, D, CE and DE, under twenty-one;
- an international driving permit shall only be issued by the contracting party in whose territory the holder has their normal residence and that issued the domestic driving permit or that recognized the driving permit issued by another contracting party; it shall not be valid for use in that territory.

Licence categories according to the 1968 convention applicable from 29 March 2011
Category	Description	Category	Description
A	Motorcycles	A1	Motorcycles with a cubic capacity not exceeding 125 cm^{3} and a power not exceeding 11 kW (light motorcycles)
B	Motor vehicles, other than those in category A, having a permissible maximum mass not exceeding 3,500 kg (7,700 lb) and not more than eight seats in addition to the driver's seat; or motor vehicles of category В coupled to a trailer the permissible maximum mass of which does not exceed 750 kg (1,650 lb); or motor vehicles of category В coupled to a trailer the permissible maximum mass of which exceeds 750 kg (1,650 lb) but does not exceed the unladen mass of the motor vehicle, where the combined permissible maximum mass of the vehicles so coupled does not exceed 3,500 kg (7,700 lb)	B1	Motor tricycles and quadricycles
C	Motor vehicles, other than those in category D, having a permissible maximum mass exceeding 3,500 kg (7,700 lb); or motor vehicles of category С coupled to a trailer the permissible maximum mass of which does not exceed 750 kg (1,650 lb)	C1	Motor vehicles, with the exception of those in category D, the permissible maximum mass of which exceeds 3,500 kg (7,700 lb) but does not exceed 7,500 kg (16,500 lb); or motor vehicles of subcategory C1 coupled to a trailer, the permissible maximum mass of which does not exceed 750 kg (1,650 lb)
D	Motor vehicles used for the carriage of passengers and having more than eight seats in addition to the driver's seat; or motor vehicles of category D coupled to a trailer the permissible maximum mass of which does not exceed 750 kg (1,650 lb)	D1	Motor vehicles used for the carriage of passengers and having more than 8 seats in addition to the driver's seat but not more than 16 seats in addition to the driver's seat; or motor vehicles of subcategory D1 coupled to a trailer, the permissible maximum mass of which does not exceed 750 kg (1,650 lb)
BE	Motor vehicles of category В coupled to a trailer the permissible maximum mass of which exceeds 750 kg (1,650 lb) and exceeds the unladen mass of the motor vehicle; or motor vehicles of category В coupled to a trailer the permissible maximum mass of which exceeds 750 kg (1,650 lb), where the combined permissible maximum mass of the vehicles so coupled exceeds 3,500 kg (7,700 lb)		
CE	Motor vehicles of category С coupled to a trailer whose permissible maximum mass exceeds 750 kg (1,650 lb)	C1E	Motor vehicles of subcategory C1 coupled to a trailer the permissible maximum mass of which exceeds 750 kg (1,650 lb) but does not exceed the unladen mass of the motor vehicle, where the combined permissible maximum mass of the vehicles so coupled does not exceed 12,000 kg (26,000 lb)
DE	Motor vehicles of category D coupled to a trailer whose permissible maximum mass exceeds 750 kg (1,650 lb)	D1E	Motor vehicles of subcategory D1 coupled to a trailer, not used for the carriage of persons, the permissible maximum mass of which exceeds 750 kg (1,650 lb) but does not exceed the unladen mass of the motor vehicle, where the combined permissible maximum mass of the vehicles so coupled does not exceed 12,000 kg (26,000 lb)

=== 1968 convention (original) ===
The convention had amendments on 3 September 1993 and 28 March 2006. There is a European Agreement supplementing the Convention on Road Traffic (1968), which was concluded in Geneva, on 1 May 1971.

Note that before 29 March 2011 the convention demanded contracting parties to recognize as valid for driving in their territories:

- any domestic driver's permit drawn up in their national language or in one of their national languages, or, if not drawn up in such a language, accompanied by a certified translation;
- any domestic driver's permit conforming to the provisions of annex 6 to the convention; and
- any international driver permit conforming to the provisions of annex 7 to the convention.

Prior to 29 March 2011, annex 6 and annex 7 defined forms of driving licences that are different from those defined after that date. Driving licences issued before 29 March 2011 that match older edition of the annexes are valid until their expiration dates (article 43).

Licence classes according to the 1968 convention
Class	Description
A	Motorcycles
B	Motor vehicles, other than those in category A, having a permissible maximum mass not exceeding 3,500 kg (7,700 lb) and not more than eight seats in addition to the driver's seat.
C	Motor vehicles, other than those in category D, whose permissible maximum mass exceeds 3,500 kg (7,700 lb).
D	Motor vehicles used for the carriage of passengers and having more than eight seats in addition to the driver's seat.
E	Combination of vehicles of which the driving vehicle is in a category or categories for which the driver is licensed (B, and/or C and/or D), but which are not themselves in that category or those categories.

=== 1949 convention ===
As of March 2025, there are 102 states that are party to the 1949 Geneva Convention on Road Traffic by ratification, accession or succession. The 1949 Convention's description of a driving permit and international driving permit are located in Annexes 9 and 10. Switzerland signed but did not ratify the convention. The 1949 Geneva Convention states that an IDP remains valid for one year from the date of issue, with a grace period of six months.

Article 24 of the convention describes requirements for drivers of motor vehicles in international traffic. Key of those are:

- Drivers with a valid driving permit are allowed to drive motor vehicles for which the permit has been issued.
- A Contracting state may require that the driver carries an international driving permit conforming to the model contained in Annex 10
  - especially if the domestic permit does not conform to the model contained in Annex 9, or if the driver comes from a country where a domestic driving permit is not required
- The right to use a domestic or international driving permit may be refused the conditions of issue are no longer fulfilled.

There is a European Agreement supplementing the 1949 Convention on Road Traffic, in addition to the 1949 Protocol on Road Signs and Signals, concluded in Geneva on 16 September 1950.

Licence classes according to the 1949 convention
Class	Description
A	Motor cycles, with or without a side-car, invalid carriages and three-wheeled motor vehicles with an unladen weight not exceeding 400 kg (880 lb).
B	Motor vehicles used for the transport of passengers and comprising, in addition to the driver's seat, at most eight seats, or those used for the transport of goods and having a permissible maximum weight not exceeding 3,500 kg (7,700 lb). Vehicles in this category may be coupled with a light trailer.
C	Motor vehicles used for the transport of goods and of which the permissible maximum weight exceeds 3,500 kg (7,700 lb). Vehicles in this category may be coupled with a light trailer.
D	Motor vehicles used for the transport of passengers and comprising, in addition to the driver's seat, more than eight seats. Vehicles in this category may be coupled with a light trailer.
E	Motor vehicles of category B, C, or D, as authorized above, with other than light trailer.

- "Permissible maximum weight" of a vehicle means the weight of the vehicle and its maximum load when the vehicle is ready for road.
- "Maximum load" means the weight of the load declared permissible by the competent authority of the country(or jurisdiction) of registration of the vehicle.
- "Light trailers" shall be those of permissible maximum weight not exceeding 750 kg (1,650 lb).

=== 1926 convention ===
The 1926 International Convention relative to Motor Traffic is the older IDP Convention. It is only required in Somalia. International Driving Permits according to the 1926 Convention on Motor Traffic might also still be valid in Liechtenstein and Mexico. However, both are parties of the above-mentioned later conventions, thus the most recent signed convention is the valid one. Mexico also recognizes the Inter-American Driving Permit according to the convention on the Regulation of Inter-American Automotive Traffic 1943.

Licence classes according to the 1926 convention
Class	Description
A	Motor vehicles of which the laden weight does not exceed 3,500 kg (7,700 lb).
B	Motor vehicles of which the laden weight exceeds 3,500 kg (7,700 lb).
C	Motor-cycles, with or without side-car.

=== Validity ===
According to the 1968 Vienna Convention, an IDP must have an expiration date of no more than three years from its issue date or until the expiration date of national driving permit, whichever is earlier, and it is valid for a period of one year upon the arrival in the foreign country. The previous convention (1949 Geneva Convention) stated that an IDP remains valid for one year from the date of issue.

The IDP is not valid for driving in the country or jurisdiction where it was issued, it can only be used in foreign countries, and it must be shown with the carrier's original driving licence.

== Countries and jurisdictions that recognize IDP ==
Participant	1968 Vienna 3-year IDP	1949 Geneva 1-year IDP	1926 Paris 1-year IDP
Albania	Yes	Yes	
Algeria		Yes	
Argentina	Yes	Yes	Yes
Armenia	Yes		
Australia		Yes	
Austria	Yes	Yes	Yes
Azerbaijan	Yes		
Bahamas	Yes		
Bahrain	Yes	Yes	
Bangladesh		Yes	
Barbados		Yes	
Belarus	Yes		
Belgium	Yes	Yes	
Benin	Yes	Yes	
Bosnia and Herzegovina	Yes		
Botswana		Yes	
Brazil	Yes		
Brunei		Yes	
Bulgaria	Yes	Yes	Yes
Burkina Faso		Yes	
Cabo Verde	Yes		
Cambodia**		Yes	
Canada		Yes	
Central African Republic	Yes	Yes	
Chile	Yes	Yes	Yes
China, Republic of (Taiwan)	Yes	Yes	
Congo		Yes	
Costa Rica	Yes		
Côte d'Ivoire	Yes	Yes	
Croatia	Yes	Yes	
Cuba	Yes	Yes	Yes
Cyprus		Yes	
Czech Republic	Yes	Yes	
Congo, Democratic Republic	Yes	Yes	
Denmark	Yes	Yes	
Dominican Republic		Yes	
Ecuador	Yes	Yes	
Egypt		Yes	Yes
Estonia	Yes	Yes	
Ethiopia		Yes	
Fiji		Yes	
Finland	Yes	Yes	
France	Yes	Yes	Yes
Georgia	Yes	Yes	
Germany	Yes		Yes
Ghana	Yes	Yes	
Greece	Yes	Yes	
Guatemala		Yes	Yes
Guyana	Yes		
Haiti		Yes	
Holy See	Yes	Yes	
Honduras	Yes		
Hong Kong		Yes	
Hungary	Yes	Yes	Yes
Iceland		Yes	
India		Yes	
Indonesia	Yes		
Iran (Islamic Republic of)	Yes	Yes	
Iraq	Yes		
Ireland		Yes	
Israel	Yes	Yes	
Italy	Yes	Yes	Yes
Jamaica		Yes	
Japan		Yes	
Jordan		Yes	
Kazakhstan	Yes		
Kenya	Yes		
Kuwait	Yes		
Kyrgyzstan	Yes	Yes	
Laos		Yes	
Latvia	Yes		
Lebanon		Yes	
Lesotho		Yes	
Liberia	Yes		
Liechtenstein	Yes	Yes	
Lithuania	Yes	Yes	
Luxembourg	Yes	Yes	Yes
Macau		Yes	
Madagascar		Yes	
Malawi		Yes	
Malaysia		Yes	
Mali		Yes	
Malta		Yes	
Mexico	Yes	Yes	Yes
Monaco	Yes	Yes	Yes
Mongolia	Yes		
Montenegro	Yes	Yes	
Morocco	Yes	Yes	Yes
Myanmar	Yes		
Namibia		Yes	
Nepal		Yes	
Netherlands	Yes	Yes	
New Zealand		Yes	
Niger	Yes	Yes	
Nigeria	Yes	Yes	
North Macedonia	Yes		
Norway	Yes	Yes	
Oman	Yes		
Pakistan	Yes		
Papua New Guinea		Yes	
Paraguay		Yes	
Peru	Yes	Yes	Yes
Philippines	Yes	Yes	
Poland	Yes	Yes	Yes
Portugal	Yes	Yes	Yes
Qatar	Yes		
Korea, Republic of	Yes	Yes	
Moldova, Republic of	Yes		
Romania	Yes	Yes	Yes
Russian Federation	Yes	Yes	
Rwanda		Yes	
San Marino	Yes	Yes	
Saudi Arabia	Yes		
Senegal	Yes	Yes	
Serbia	Yes	Yes	
Seychelles	Yes		
Sierra Leone		Yes	
Singapore		Yes	
Slovakia	Yes	Yes	
Slovenia	Yes	Yes	
South Africa	Yes	Yes	
Spain	Yes	Yes	
Sri Lanka		Yes	
Sweden	Yes	Yes	
Switzerland	Yes	Yes	Yes
Syrian Arab Republic		Yes	
Tajikistan	Yes		
Thailand	Yes	Yes	
Togo		Yes	
Trinidad and Tobago		Yes	
Tunisia	Yes	Yes	Yes
Turkey	Yes	Yes	
Turkmenistan	Yes		
Uganda		Yes	
Ukraine	Yes		
United Arab Emirates	Yes	Yes	
United Kingdom	Yes	Yes	
United States of America		Yes	
Uruguay	Yes		Yes
Uzbekistan	Yes		
Venezuela	Yes	Yes	
Vietnam	Yes		
Zimbabwe	Yes	Yes	

** IDP must be exchanged for a local driving licence.

- In relations between the Contracting States, the 1949 Geneva Convention terminated and replaced the International Convention relative to Motor Traffic and the International Convention relative to Road Traffic signed at Paris on 24 April 1926, and the convention on the Regulation of Inter- American Automotive Traffic opened for signature at Washington on 15 December 1943.
- In relations between the Contracting States, the 1968 Vienna Convention terminated and replaced the International Convention relative to Motor Traffic and the International Convention relative to Road Traffic, signed at Paris on 24 April 1926, the convention on the Regulation of Inter-American Automotive Traffic, opened for signature at Washington on 15 December 1943, and the Convention on Road Traffic, opened for signature at Geneva on 19 September 1949.

== ISO compliant driving licence ==
ISO/IEC 18013 establishes guidelines for the design format and data content of an ISO-compliant driving licence (IDL). The design approach is to establish a secure domestic driving permit (DDP) and accompanying booklet for international use, instead of the international driving permit (IDP) paper document. The ISO standard specifies requirements for a card that is aligned with the UN Conventions on Road Traffic.

This standard however has no official mandate or recognition from the WP.1 of UNECE as a replacement for the current IDP standards as described in the 1949 and 1968 Conventions.

=== Card design ===
The requirements with regards to content and layout of the data elements is contained in Annex A of ISO/IEC 18013-1:2018. While the main ideology is a minimum acceptable set of requirements, sufficient freedom is afforded to the issuing authorities of driving licences to meet domestic needs such as existing standards, data contents and security elements.

=== Booklet layout ===
The specifications of the layout of the booklet is defined in Annex G of ISO/IEC 18013-1:2018. There are two options; a booklet with some personalization or a booklet with no personalization.

The booklet shall be marginally larger than an ID-1 size driving licence card, with an insert pocket for storage of the card, and for convenient carrying of the booklet. The front cover should include the logo of the UN or the issuing country and the words "Translation of Driving Licence" and Traduction du permis de conduire.

=== Implementation ===
The American Association of Motor Vehicle Administrators' provides a standard for the design of driving permits and identification cards issued by its member jurisdictions, which include all 50 US states, the District of Columbia, and Canadian territories and provinces. The newest standard released is the 2025 AAMVA DL/ID Card Design Standard (CDS) which generally follows part 1 and part 2 of ISO/IEC 18013-1 (ISO compliant driving licence).
