= Geneva Convention on Road Traffic =

1949 international treaty

Convention on Road Traffic
- Signatory Ratification Accession or succession Former territorial application
- Signed: 19 September 1949
- Location: Geneva, Switzerland
- Effective: 26 March 1952
- Signatories: 19
- Parties: 102 (2 March 2025): Albania; Algeria; Argentina; Australia; Austria; Bangladesh; Barbados; Belgium; Benin; Botswana; Brunei; Bulgaria; Burkina Faso; Cambodia; Canada; Central African Republic; Chile; Congo; Côte d'Ivoire; Croatia; Cuba; Cyprus; Czech Republic; Democratic Republic of the Congo; Denmark; Dominican Republic; Ecuador; Egypt; Estonia; Fiji; Finland; France; Georgia; Ghana; Greece; Guatemala; Haiti; Holy See; Hungary; Iceland; India; Ireland; Israel; Italy; Jamaica; Japan; Jordan; Kyrgyzstan; Laos; Lebanon; Lesotho; Liechtenstein; Lithuania; Luxembourg; Madagascar; Malawi; Malaysia; Mali; Malta; Monaco; Montenegro; Morocco; Namibia; Netherlands; New Zealand; Niger; Nigeria; Norway; Papua New Guinea; Paraguay; Peru; Philippines; Poland; Portugal; Romania; Russia; Rwanda; San Marino; Senegal; Serbia; Sierra Leone; Singapore; Slovakia; Slovenia; South Africa; South Korea; Spain; Sri Lanka; Sweden; Syrian Arab Republic; Thailand; Togo; Trinidad and Tobago; Tunisia; Turkey; Uganda; United Arab Emirates; United Kingdom; United States; Venezuela; Vietnam; Zimbabwe
- Depositary: UN Secretary-General
- Languages: English and French

Full text
- Geneva Convention on Road Traffic at Wikisource

The Geneva Convention on Road Traffic is an international treaty promoting the development and safety of international road traffic by establishing certain uniform rules among the contracting parties. The convention addresses minimum mechanical and safety equipment needed to be on board and defines an identification mark to identify the origin of the vehicle. The Convention was prepared and opened for signature by the United Nations Conference on Road and Motor Transport held at Geneva from 23 August to 19 September 1949. It came into force on 26 March 1952. This conference also produced the Protocol on Road Signs and Signals.

There is a European Agreement supplementing the 1949 Convention on Road Traffic, in addition to the 1949 Protocol on Road Signs and Signals, concluded in Geneva on 16 September 1950.

== Contracting parties ==
The Geneva Convention on Road Traffic was concluded in Geneva on 19 September 1949. The convention has been ratified by 101 countries. Since its entry into force on 26 March 1952, between signatory countries ("Contracting Parties") it replaces previous road traffic conventions, notably the 1926 International Convention relative to Motor Traffic and the Convention on the Regulation of Inter-American Automotive Traffic in accordance with Article 30 of the Convention.

Many of the contracting parties have also ratified the newer convention the Vienna Convention on Road Traffic of 1968. Between signatory countries of the 1968 Vienna Convention, this replaces previous road traffic conventions including the Geneva Convention on Road Traffic, in accordance with Article 48 of the Vienna Convention.

== Cross-border vehicles ==
Distinguishing sign of the State of registration. D denotes Deutschland (Germany).

One of the main benefits of the convention for motorists is the obligation on signatory countries to recognize the legality of vehicles from other signatory countries. The following requirements must be met when driving outside the country of registration:

- Cars must display their registration number (vehicle registration plate) at the rear at least. Registration numbers must consist either of figures or of figures and letters. They must be displayed in capital Latin characters and Arabic numerals. In addition to this, the registration number may optionally be displayed in a different alphabet. Registration numbers can not consist of only letters; according to the current wording of paragraph 1 of Annex 3, a vehicle with the registration number with only letters would not be allowed in international traffic. An amendment to this requirement was proposed in 2016.
- A distinguishing sign of the country of registration must be displayed on the rear of the vehicle. This sign must be placed separately from the registration plate. It may not be incorporated into the vehicle registration plate (such as the EU format registration plates).
- The physical requirements for the distinguishing sign are defined in Annex 4 of the Geneva Convention on Road Traffic, which states that the letters shall be in black on a white background having the shape of an ellipse with the major axis horizontal.
- The vehicle must meet all technical requirements to be legal for road use in the country of registration. Any conflicting technical requirements (e.g., right-hand-drive or left-hand-drive) in the signatory country where the vehicle is being driven do not apply.
- The driver must carry the vehicle's registration certificate, and if the vehicle is not registered in the name of an occupant of the vehicle (e.g., a hire car), proof of the driver's right to be in possession of the vehicle.

Registration plates with the distinguishing sign incorporated, such as the common EU format, are not valid in countries that are party only to the Geneva Convention on Road Traffic, unless they are members of the EU/EEA. It does however satisfy the requirements set out in the Vienna Convention on Road Traffic.

The requirement to display a distinguishing sign as defined in the Geneva Convention on Road Traffic is waived between some countries, for example within the European Economic Area, for vehicles with registration plates in the common EU format (which incorporates the distinguishing sign into the registration plate). This is also possible in countries party to the newer Vienna Convention on Road Traffic, and between Canada and the United States (where the province, state, or district of registration is usually embossed or surface-printed on the vehicle registration plate).

== International Driving Permit ==
The Geneva Convention on Road Traffic is one of three conventions that governs International Driving Permits. The other two are the 1926 Paris International Convention relative to Motor Traffic and the 1968 Vienna Convention on Road Traffic. When a state is contracting to more than one convention, the newest one terminates and replaces previous ones in relation between those states.

The 1949 Convention's description of a driving permit and international driving permit are located in Annexes 9 and 10. The 1949 Geneva Convention states that an IDP remains valid for one year from the date of issue.

Article 24 of the convention describes requirements for drivers of motor vehicles in international traffic. Key of those are:

- Drivers with a valid driving permit are allowed to drive motor vehicles for which the permit has been issued.
- A Contracting state may require that the driver carries an international driving permit conforming to the model contained in Annex 10
  - especially if the domestic permit does not conform to the model contained in Annex 9, or if the driver comes from a country where a domestic driving permit is not required
- The right to use a domestic or international driving permit may be refused the conditions of issue are no longer fulfilled.

Licence classes according to the 1949 convention
| Class | Description |
|---|---|
| A | Motor cycles, with or without a side-car, invalid carriages and three-wheeled motor vehicles with an unladen weight not exceeding 400 kg (880 lb). |
| B | Motor vehicles used for the transport of passengers and comprising, in addition to the driver's seat, at most eight seats, or those used for the transport of goods and having a permissible maximum weight not exceeding 3,500 kg (7,700 lb). Vehicles in this category may be coupled with a light trailer. |
| C | Motor vehicles used for the transport of goods and of which the permissible maximum weight exceeds 3,500 kg (7,700 lb). Vehicles in this category may be coupled with a light trailer. |
| D | Motor vehicles used for the transport of passengers and comprising, in addition to the driver's seat, more than eight seats. Vehicles in this category may be coupled with a light trailer. |
| E | Motor vehicles of category B, C, or D, as authorized above, with other than light trailer. |

- "Permissible maximum weight" of a vehicle means the weight of the vehicle and its maximum load when the vehicle is ready for road.
- "Maximum load" means the weight of the load declared permissible by the competent authority of the country(or jurisdiction) of registration of the vehicle.
- "Light trailers" shall be those of permissible maximum weight not exceeding 750 kg (1,650 lb).

== See also ==
- List of international vehicle registration codes
- International Driving Permit
- Vienna Convention on Road Traffic
- Rules of the road
