= Vienna Convention on Road Traffic =

International treaty

Convention on Road Traffic
Participation in the Vienna Convention on Road Traffic
Signed and ratified
Acceded or succeeded
Signatory only
- Signed: 8 November 1968
- Location: Vienna
- Effective: 21 May 1977
- Signatories: 36
- Parties: 86: Albania; Armenia; Austria; Azerbaijan; Bahamas; Bahrain; Belarus; Belgium; Benin; Bosnia and Herzegovina; Brazil; Bulgaria; Cabo Verde; Central African Republic; Côte d'Ivoire; Croatia; Cuba; Czech Republic; Democratic Republic of the Congo; Denmark; Egypt; Estonia; Ethiopia; Finland; France; Georgia; Germany; Greece; Guyana; Honduras; Hungary; Iran; Iraq; Israel; Italy; Kazakhstan; Kenya; Kuwait; Kyrgyzstan; Latvia; Liberia; Liechtenstein; Lithuania; Luxembourg; Moldova; Monaco; Mongolia; Montenegro; Morocco; Myanmar; Netherlands; Niger; Nigeria; North Macedonia; Norway; Oman; Pakistan; Palestine; Peru; Philippines; Poland; Portugal; Qatar; Romania; Russia; San Marino; Saudi Arabia; Senegal; Serbia; Seychelles; Slovakia; Slovenia; South Africa; Sweden; Switzerland; Taiwan; Tajikistan; Thailand; Tunisia; Turkey; Turkmenistan; Uganda; Ukraine; United Kingdom; Uruguay; Uzbekistan; Vietnam; Zimbabwe
- Depositary: UN Secretary-General
- Languages: English, French, Chinese, Russian, and Spanish

Full text
- Vienna Convention on Road Traffic at Wikisource

The Vienna Convention on Road Traffic is an international treaty designed to facilitate international road traffic and to increase road safety by establishing standard traffic rules among the contracting parties. The convention was agreed upon at the United Nations Economic and Social Council's Conference on Road Traffic (7 October – 8 November 1968) and concluded in Vienna on 8 November 1968. This conference also produced the Convention on Road Signs and Signals. The convention had amendments on 3 September 1993 and 28 March 2006. There is a European Agreement supplementing the Convention on Road Traffic (1968), which was concluded in Geneva on 1 May 1971.

== Contracting parties ==
The Vienna Convention on Road Traffic was concluded at Vienna on 8 November 1968. Since its entry into force on 21 May 1977, in signatory countries ("Contracting Parties") it replaces previous road traffic conventions, notably the 1949 Geneva Convention on Road Traffic, in accordance with Article 48 of the convention. As of October 2022, the convention has been ratified by 86 countries, but those who have not ratified the convention may still be parties to the 1949 Geneva Convention on Road Traffic. Ireland, Canada, the United States, Cyprus, Iceland, Malta, China and Malaysia are examples of non-signatory countries. Several other countries, such as Spain and Mexico, have signed the convention but have not ratified it.

== Cross-border vehicles ==
Distinguishing sign of the state of registration as a separate sign and as a field incorporated into the vehicle registration plate. CH denotes Confoederatio helvetica (Swiss Confederation), D denotes Deutschland (Germany), N denotes Norge (Norway) and BY denotes Беларусь (Belarus).

One of the main benefits of the convention for motorists is the obligation on signatory countries to recognize the legality of vehicles from other signatory countries. The following requirements must be met when driving outside the country of registration:

- Cars must display their registration number at the front and rear, even if legislation in the jurisdiction of registration does not require a front vehicle registration plate on cars. Motorcycles need to display their registration number only at the rear. Registration numbers must be composed either of numerals or of numerals and letters. They must be displayed in capital Latin characters and Arabic numerals. In addition to this, the registration number may optionally be displayed in a different alphabet.
- A distinguishing sign of the country of registration must be displayed on the rear of the vehicle. This sign may either be placed separately from the registration plate or may be incorporated into the vehicle registration plate.
- The physical requirements for the separate sign are defined in Annex 3 of the Vienna Convention on Road Traffic, which states that the letters shall be in black on a white background having the shape of an ellipse with the major axis horizontal. The distinguishing sign should not be affixed in such a way that it could be confused with the registration number or impair its legibility.
- When the distinguishing sign is incorporated into the registration plate, it must also appear on the front registration plate of the vehicle, and may be supplemented with the flag or emblem of the national state, or the emblem of the regional economic integration organization to which the country belongs. The distinguishing sign should be displayed on the far left or far right on the registration plate. When a symbol/flag/emblem is also displayed, the distinguishing sign shall obligatorily be placed on the far left on the plate. The distinguishing sign shall be positioned to be easily identifiable and so that it cannot be confused with the registration number or impair its legibility. The distinguishing sign shall therefore be at least a different color from the registration number, or have a different background color to that reserved for the registration number, or be clearly separated from the registration number, preferably with a line.
- The vehicle must meet all technical requirements to be legal for road use in the country of registration. Any conflicting technical requirements (e.g., right-hand-drive or left-hand-drive) in the signatory country where the vehicle is being driven do not apply.
- The driver must carry the vehicle's registration certificate, and if the vehicle is not registered in the name of an occupant of the vehicle (e.g., a hire car), proof of the driver's right to be in possession of the vehicle.

The convention also addresses minimum mechanical and safety equipment needed to be on board and defines an identification mark (Annex 4) to identify the origin of the vehicle.

== Vienna Convention and autonomous driving ==
One of the fundamental principles of the convention has been the concept that a driver is always fully in control and responsible for the behavior of a vehicle in traffic. This requirement is challenged by the development of technology for collision avoidance systems and autonomous driving.

Since 2021, an automated driving system definition is proposed — in Article 1 of Convention on Road Traffic — as a vehicle system that uses both hardware and software to exercise dynamic control of a vehicle on a sustained basis where Dynamic control is defined as carrying out all the real-time operational and tactical functions required to move the vehicle. This includes controlling the vehicle's lateral and longitudinal motion, monitoring the road, responding to events in the road traffic, and planning and signalling for manoeuvres.

The requirement that every moving vehicle or combination of vehicles shall have a driver is deemed to be satisfied while the vehicle is using an automated driving system which complies with:

(a) domestic technical regulations, and any applicable international legal instrument, concerning wheeled vehicles, equipment and parts which can be fitted and/or be used on wheeled vehicles, and

(b) domestic legislation governing operation.

The effect of this Article is limited to the territory of the Contracting Party where the relevant domestic technical regulations and legislation governing operation apply.

— Article 34 bis, Automated driving (proposed amendment)

According to a British explanatory Memorandum on the Proposal of Amendment to Article 1 and new Article 34 bis of the 1968 Convention on Road Traffic, this amendment should enter into force 18 months following the date of its circulation, on 14 July 2022, unless it is rejected before 13 January 2022.

== International Driving Permit ==
The Vienna Convention on Road Traffic is the newest of three conventions that governs International Driving Permits. The other two are the 1926 Paris International Convention relative to Motor Traffic and the 1949 Geneva Convention on Road Traffic. When a state is contracting to more than one convention, the newest one terminates and replaces previous ones in relations between those states.

The main regulations about driving licences are in Annex 6 (domestic driving permit) and Annex 7 (International Driving Permit). The currently active version of those is in force in each contracting party since no later than 29 March 2011 (Article 43). According to the 1968 Vienna Convention, an IDP must have an expiration date of no more than three years from its issue date or until the expiration date of national driving permit, whichever is earlier, and it is valid for a period of one year upon the arrival in the foreign country.

Article 41 of the convention describes requirements for driving licences. Key of those are:

- every driver of a motor vehicle must hold a driving licence;
- driving licences can be issued only after passing theoretical and practical exams, which are regulated by each country or jurisdiction;
- Contracting parties shall recognize as valid for driving in their territories:
  - domestic driving licence conforms to the provisions of annex 6 to the convention;
  - International Driving Permit conforms to the provisions of annex 7 to the convention, on condition that it is presented with the corresponding domestic driving licence;
- driving licences issued by a contracting party shall be recognised in the territory of another contracting party until this territory becomes the place of normal residence of their holder;
- all of the above does not apply to learner-driver licences;
- the period of validity of an international driving permit shall be either no more than three years after the date of issue or until the date of expiry of the domestic driving licence, whichever is earlier;
- Contracting parties may refuse to recognise the validity of driving licences for persons under eighteen or, for categories C, D, CE and DE, under twenty-one;
- an international driving permit shall be issued only by the contracting party in whose territory the holder has their normal residence and that issued the domestic driving licence or that recognised the driving licence issued by another contracting party; it shall not be valid for use in that territory.

Licence categories according to the 1968 convention applicable from 29 March 2011,
Category	Description	Category	Description
A	Motorcycles	A1	Motorcycles with a cubic capacity not exceeding 125 cm³ and a power not exceeding 11 kW (light motorcycles)
B	Motor vehicles, other than those in category A, having a permissible maximum mass not exceeding 3,500 kg and not more than eight seats in addition to the driver's seat; or motor vehicles of category В coupled to a trailer the permissible maximum mass of which does not exceed 750 kg; or motor vehicles of category В coupled to a trailer the permissible maximum mass of which exceeds 750 kg but does not exceed the unladen mass of the motor vehicle, where the combined permissible maximum mass of the vehicles so coupled does not exceed 3,500 kg	B1	Motor tricycles and quadricycles
C	Motor vehicles, other than those in category D, having a permissible maximum mass exceeding 3,500 kg; or motor vehicles of category С coupled to a trailer the permissible maximum mass of which does not exceed 750 kg	C1	Motor vehicles, with the exception of those in category D, the permissible maximum mass of which exceeds 3,500 kg but does not exceed 7,500 kg; or motor vehicles of subcategory C1 coupled to a trailer, the permissible maximum mass of which does not exceed 750 kg
D	Motor vehicles used for the carriage of passengers and having more than eight seats in addition to the driver's seat; or motor vehicles of category D coupled to a trailer the permissible maximum mass of which does not exceed 750 kg	D1	Motor vehicles used for the carriage of passengers and having more than 8 seats in addition to the driver's seat but not more than 16 seats in addition to the driver's seat; or motor vehicles of subcategory D1 coupled to a trailer, the permissible maximum mass of which does not exceed 750 kg
BE	Motor vehicles of category В coupled to a trailer the permissible maximum mass of which exceeds 750 kg and exceeds the unladen mass of the motor vehicle; or motor vehicles of category В coupled to a trailer the permissible maximum mass of which exceeds 750 kg, where the combined permissible maximum mass of the vehicles so coupled exceeds 3,500 kg		
CE	Motor vehicles of category С coupled to a trailer whose permissible maximum mass exceeds 750 kg	C1E	Motor vehicles of subcategory C1 coupled to a trailer the permissible maximum mass of which exceeds 750 kg but does not exceed the unladen mass of the motor vehicle, where the combined permissible maximum mass of the vehicles so coupled does not exceed 12,000 kg
DE	Motor vehicles of category D coupled to a trailer whose permissible maximum mass exceeds 750 kg	D1E	Motor vehicles of subcategory D1 coupled to a trailer, not used for the carriage of persons, the permissible maximum mass of which exceeds 750 kg but does not exceed the unladen mass of the motor vehicle, where the combined permissible maximum mass of the vehicles so coupled does not exceed 12,000 kg

Prior to 29 March 2011, annex 6 and annex 7 defined forms of driver's licences that are different from those defined after that date. Driving licences issued before 29 March 2011 that match older edition of the annexes are valid until their expiration dates (article 43).

Before 29 March 2011 the convention demanded contracting parties to recognise as valid for driving in their territories:

- any domestic driver's licence drawn up in their national language or in one of their national languages, or, if not drawn up in such a language, accompanied by a certified translation;
- any domestic driver's licence conforming to the provisions of annex 6 to the convention; and
- any international driver permit conforming to the provisions of annex 7 to the convention.

== International conventions on transit transport ==
The broad objective of these international conventions and agreements, the depositary of which is the Secretary-General of the United Nations, is to facilitate international transport while providing for a high level of safety, security, and environmental protection in transport:

- AETR (Accord Européen sur les Transports Routiers) European Agreement concerning the Work of Crews of Vehicles engaged in International Road Transport (1970)
- Agreement on the International Carriage of Perishable Foodstuffs and on the Special Equipment to be used for such Carriage (ATP) (1970)
- Convention on Customs Treatment of Pool Containers Used in International Transport (1994)
- Convention on the Contract for the International Carriage of Goods By Road (1956) and its protocol (1978)
- Convention concerning Customs Facilities for Touring (1954)
- Customs Convention on Containers (1956, 1972)
- Customs Convention on the Temporary Importation of Commercial Road Vehicles (1956)
- Customs Convention on the Temporary Importation of Private Road Vehicles (1954)
- European Agreement concerning the International Carriage of Dangerous Goods by Road (ADR) (1957) and its Protocol amending articles 1 and 14 (1993)
- Geneva Convention on Road Traffic (1949)
- International Convention to Facilitate the Crossing of Frontiers for Passengers and Baggage Carried by Rail (1952)
- International Convention to Facilitate the Crossing of Frontiers for Goods Carried by Rail (1952)
- International Convention on the Harmonization of Frontier Controls of Goods (1982)
- TIR Convention

== See also ==
- Vienna Convention on Road Signs and Signals
- List of international vehicle registration codes
- International Driving Permit
- Rules of the road
