= Bowie =

Bowie may refer to:

== People ==
- Bowie (surname), origin of the surname and a list of people with the surname, including particularly:
  - David Bowie (1947–2016), English singer, songwriter, and actor
  - James Bowie (c. 1796–1836), Texan revolutionary
  - Bowie Kuhn (1926–2007), fifth Commissioner of Major League Baseball

== Places ==
- Bowie, Arizona, an unincorporated community
- Bowie, Colorado, an unincorporated community
- Bowie, Maryland, a city
- Bowie County, Texas
- Bowie, Texas, a city in Montague County
- Fort Bowie, a 19th-century U.S. Army outpost in Arizona
- Bowie Seamount, a submarine volcano on the coast of British Columbia, Canada
- Bowie hotspot, a volcanic hotspot in the Pacific Ocean
- Bowie Canyon, a submarine canyon in the Bering Sea
- Bowie Crevasse Field, Ellsworth Mountains, Antarctica

== Entertainment ==
- Bowie (Shining Force II), the default name of the protagonist in the Shining Force II video game
- "Bowie" (Flight of the Conchords), the sixth episode of the television series Flight of the Conchords
- Bowie: A Biography, a biography of David Bowie by Marc Spitz
- Bowie – The Video Collection, a video album by David Bowie

== Ships ==
- USC&GS Bowie (CSS 27), a United States Coast and Geodetic Survey coastal survey ship in commission from 1946 to 1967
- USS Bowie (APA-137), a United States Navy attack transport in commission from 1944 to 1946

== Other uses ==
- Bowie, a spider genus
- Bowie Handicap (Bowie), a horse race held at Bowie Race Track near Bowie, Maryland, in 1939 and later
- Bowie Handicap (Pimlico), a horse race held at Pimlico Race Course in Baltimore, Maryland, from 1909 to 1938
- Bowie High School (disambiguation), a list of high schools named Bowie
- Bowie knife, popularized by Jim Bowie
- Bowie Race Track, a horse racing track located near Bowie, Maryland
- Bowie State University, located north of Bowie, Maryland

== See also ==
- Boøwy or Boowy, a Japanese rock band
- Bowi, an album by Nick Lowe, named after David Bowie
- Buie (disambiguation)
- Dowie, a surname
- Cowie (disambiguation)
