= Buie =

Buie may refer to:

- Buje or Buie, the Italian name of a town in Istria, Croatia
- Betel nut
- Ben Buie, a mountain in Scotland
- Maryland v. Buie (1990), American Supreme Court decision

== People ==
- Boo Buie (born 1999), American basketball player
- Buddy Buie (1941–2015), American songwriter
- Corinne Buie (born 1992), American ice hockey player
- Cullen Buie, American mechanical engineer
- Desure Buie (born 1997), American basketball player
- Dougal M. Buie (1888–1938), American athlete
- Drew Buie (born 1947), American football player
- James L. Buie (1920–1988), American scientist
- Jarriett Buie (born 1985), American football player
- Marc W. Buie, American astronomer
- Michael Buie, Canadian actor
- Timothy Buie, American gastroenterologist
- Malcolm Buie Seawell (1909-1977), American politician
  - Buie Seawell (born 1937), American academic, Malcolm Seawell's son
- Maxine Buie Mimms (1928–2024), American academic
