= James Bowie (disambiguation) =

James Bowie (c.1796–1836) was an American pioneer, fighter and frontiersman.

James Bowie may also refer to:

- James Bowie (botanist) (c.1789–1869), English botanist
- James Bowie (footballer) (1888–1972), Scottish footballer
- Jimmy Bowie (1924–2000), Scottish footballer
- Jim Bowie (footballer, born 1941) (born 1941), Scottish footballer see List of Oldham Athletic A.F.C. players
- Jim Bowie (baseball) (born 1965), American baseball first baseman

== Education ==
- James Bowie Middle School
- James Bowie High School (Simms, Texas)
- James Bowie Elementary School

== See also ==
- James Bowie High School (disambiguation)
