= Washington Institute =

Washington Institute may refer to:

- The Washington Institute for Near East Policy, American think tank
- Washington Institute for Values in Public Policy, an organization associated with the Unification Church
- Washington Institute in St. Louis, now known as Washington University

== See also ==
- Booker Washington Institute
- Lake Washington Institute of Technology
- Washington State Institute for Public Policy
