= JBHS =

JBHS may refer to:

- Bowie High School (Arlington, Texas), in Arlington, Texas
- Bowie High School (Austin, Texas), in Austin, Texas
- Jack Britt High School, in Cumberland County, North Carolina
- Jensen Beach High School, in Jensen Beach, Florida
- Joel Barlow High School, in Redding, Connecticut
- John Burroughs High School, in Burbank, California
- James Buchanan High School, in Mercersburg, Pennsylvania

== See also ==
- Bowie High School (disambiguation), several high schools of that name
