= Bowie Handicap =

Bowie Handicap may refer to one of the following American horse races:

- Bowie Handicap (Pimlico), held at Pimlico Race Course in Baltimore, Maryland, from 1909 to 1938
- Bowie Handicap (Bowie), held at Bowie Race Track near Bowie, Maryland, in 1939 and later

== See also ==
- Bowie (disambiguation)
- Handicap (horse racing)
