= William Bowie (engineer) =

American geodetic engineer

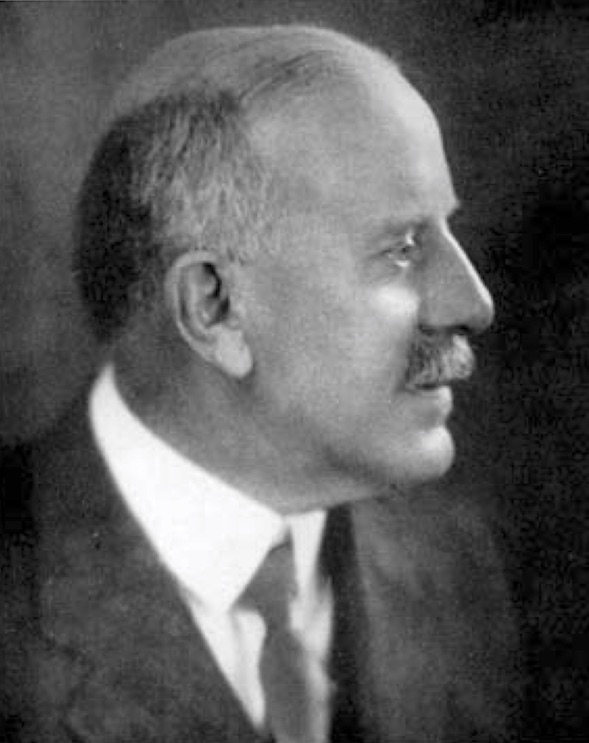
- Bowie c. 1936
- Born: May 6, 1872; Grassland, Annapolis Junction, Maryland
- Died: August 28, 1940 (aged 68); Washington, DC
- Awards: William Bowie Medal (1939)
- Scientific career
- Fields: Geodesy

William Bowie (May 6, 1872 – August 28, 1940) was an American geodetic engineer noted for promoting geophysical sciences and for being the first President of the American Geophysical Union (AGU). The William Bowie Medal, the highest honor of the AGU, is named in his honor.

== Background and education ==
Bowie was born at Grassland, an historic estate near Annapolis Junction, Anne Arundel County, Maryland, to Thomas John Bowie and Susanna Anderson. He was educated in public schools, at St. John's College in Annapolis, Maryland, Trinity College in Hartford, Connecticut (B.S. 1893; M.A. 1907; Sc.D. 1919), and Lehigh (C.E. 1895; Sc.D. 1922). He received honorary degrees (LL.D. 1936) from the University of Edinburgh, Scotland, at the meeting of the International Union of Geodesy and Geophysics (IUGG) of which he was president from 1933 to 1936, and from George Washington University (Sc.D. 1937).

== Career ==
In 1895 Bowie entered the United States Coast and Geodetic Survey. During World War I he served in the United States Corps of Engineers as a major.

He represented the United States at various international geodetic conferences and congresses. His scientific researches had to do with the theory of isostasy and its applications to dynamic and structural geology. He retired from government service at the age of 64 in 1936.

Bowie's professional activity was directed towards three general objectives:

- "Promotion of mapping of the United States and its territories and improvement of cartographic methods and technique.
- Expansion of geodetic work and improvement of instruments and methods.
- Promotion of interest and progress in geophysical sciences, through the media of national and international bodies."

He was elected in 1907 a Fellow of the American Association for the Advancement of Science, in 1925 a Fellow of the American Physical Society, and in 1927 a Member of the National Academy of Sciences.

He was the first President of the American Geophysical Union from 1920 to 1922 and served as president a second time from 1929 to 1932.

In 1932, Bowie received the Prix Charles Lagrange from the Académie royale des Sciences, des Lettres et des Beaux-Arts de Belgique. He later received the Franklin Institute's Elliott Cresson Medal in 1937.

== Personal ==
An Episcopalian, Bowie married Elizabeth Taylor Wattles of Alexandria, Virginia, on June 28, 1899. Together, they had two children, William (Jr.) and Clagett. William died after a three-week illness and lies buried in Arlington National Cemetery.

== Legacy ==
Two undersea features, the Bowie Seamount and the Bowie Canyon, are named after William Bowie. The William Bowie Medal, the highest honor of the American Geophysical Union, is named in his honor. The U.S. Coast and Geodetic Survey coastal survey ship USC&GS Bowie (CSS 27), in commission from 1946 to 1967, was named for him.

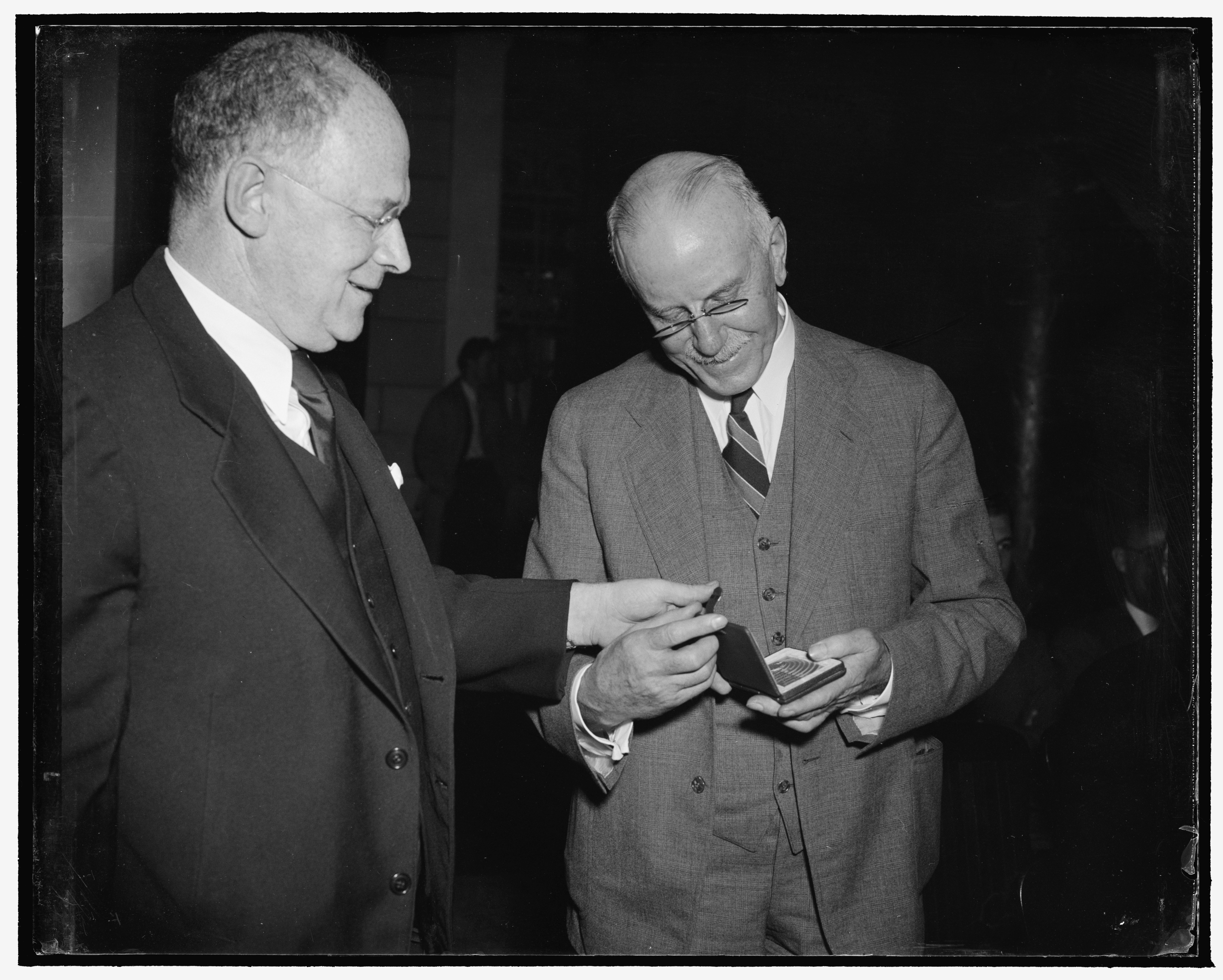
Bowie with the medal named after him

== See also ==
- List of geophysicists

== Selected bibliography ==
- Hayford, John Fillmore; Bowie, William (1912). Geodesy: The Effect of Topography and Isostatic Compensation Upon the Intensity of Gravity, Issue 10. U.S. Government Printing Office. OCLC 222118091.
- Bowie, William (1912). Geodesy: Effect of Topography and Isostatic Compensation Upon the Intensity of Gravity. (Second Paper). U.S. Government Printing Office. OCLC 16079396.
- —— (1912). Geodesy: The Texas-California Arc of Primary Triangulation. U.S. Government Printing Office. OCLC 15654307.
- —— (1913). Astronomy: Determination of Time, Longitude, Latitude, and Azimuth, Volume 4 (5 ed.). U.S. Government Printing Office. OCLC 11020911.
- —— (1914). Geodesy: Primary Triangulation on the One Hundred and Fourth Meridian, and on the Thirty-ninth Parallel in Colorado, Utah, Nevada, Volume 4. U.S. Government Printing Office. OCLC 8675932.
- —— (1914). Hypsometry: Precise Leveling from Brigham, Utah, to San Francisco, California, Volume 4. U.S. Government Printing Office. OCLC 1105366560.
- —— (1917). Geodesy: Investigations of Gravity and Isostasy, Issue 40. U.S. Government Printing Office. OCLC 10619997.
- —— (1920). "Present Status of Geodesy and Some of the Problems of this Branch of Geophysics". Proceedings of the National Academy of Sciences of the United States of America. 6 (10): 545–555. Bibcode:1920PNAS....6..545B. doi:10.1073/pnas.6.10.545. PMC 1084632. PMID 16576537.
- —— (1921). "Some Geologic Conclusions from Geodetic Data". Proceedings of the National Academy of Sciences of the United States of America. 7 (1): 23–28. Bibcode:1921PNAS....7...23B. doi:10.1073/pnas.7.1.23. PMC 1084725. PMID 16576573.
- —— (1922). "The Earth's Crust and Isostasy". Geographical Review. 12 (4): 613–627. Bibcode:1922GeoRv..12..613B. doi:10.2307/208594. JSTOR 208594.
- —— (1923). Study of Time Errors in Precise Longitude Determinations by the U.S. Coast and Geodetic Survey, Volume 4. U.S. Government Printing Office. OCLC 15394732.
