= Aviation law =

Field of law

Aviation law is the branch of law that concerns flight, air travel, and associated legal and business concerns. Some of its area of concern overlaps that of admiralty law and, in many cases, aviation law is considered a matter of international law due to the nature of air travel. However, the business aspects of airlines and their regulation also fall under aviation law. In the international realm, the International Civil Aviation Organization (ICAO) provides general rules and mediates international concerns to an extent regarding aviation law. The ICAO is a specialized agency of the United Nations.

In the United States and in most European nations, aviation law is considered a federal or state-level concern and is regulated at that level. In the U.S., states cannot govern aviation matters in most cases directly but look to federal laws and case law for this function instead. For example, in 2008, The United States Court of Appeals for the Second Circuit struck down New York's Passenger Bill of Rights law because regulation of aviation is traditionally a federal concern. Aviation law, however, is not in the United States held under the same federal mandate of jurisdiction as admiralty law; that is, while the United States Constitution provides for the administration of admiralty, it does not provide such for aviation law. States and municipalities do have some indirect regulation over aviation. For example, zoning laws can require an airport to be located away from residential areas, and airport usage can be restricted to certain times of day. State product-liabilities law are not pre-empted by federal law and in most cases, aviation manufacturers may be held strictly liable for defects in aviation products.

Space law, which governs matters in outer space beyond the Earth's atmosphere, is a relatively new area with the Outer Space Treaty in 1967.

== History ==
Roman law and other ancient land systems generally granted all rights in airspace to the owner of the underlying land. The first law specifically applicable to aircraft was a local ordinance enacted in Paris in 1784, one year after the first hot air balloon flight by the Montgolfier brothers. Several court cases involving balloonists were tried in common law jurisdictions during the 19th century.

=== Development of public international law ===
Balloons were used in the Franco-German War of 1870–71, and the First Hague Conference of 1899 set a five-year moratorium on the use of balloons in combat operations, which was not renewed by the Second Hague Conference (1907). Prior to World War I, several nations signed bilateral agreements regarding the legal status of international flights, and during the war, several nations took the step of prohibiting flights over their territory. Several competing multilateral treaty regimes were established in the wake of the war, including the Paris Convention of 1919, Ibero-American Convention (1926) and the Havana Convention (1928). The International Air Transport Association (IATA) was founded in 1919 in a conference at The Hague, to foster cooperation between airlines in various commercial and legal areas.

The lack of uniformity in international air law, particularly with regard to the liability of international airlines, led to the Warsaw Convention of 1929.

The Chicago Convention on International Civil Aviation was signed in 1944, during World War II. It provided for the establishment of the International Civil Aviation Organization as a unit of the United Nations devoted to overseeing civil aviation. The convention also provided various general principles governing international air service.

The Tokyo Convention of 1963 enacted new international standards for the treatment of criminal offenses on or involving aircraft. The Montreal Convention of 1999 updated the carrier liability provisions of the Warsaw Convention, while the Cape Town Treaty of 2001 created an international regime for the registration of security interests in aircraft and certain other large movable assets.

=== Development of national regulations ===
==== United Kingdom ====
The United Kingdom enacted the Air Navigation Act 1920, which formed the basis of aviation regulation in the United Kingdom and its colonies.

==== Communist bloc ====
The Russian Soviet Federative Socialist Republic declared sovereignty over its airspace and enacted basic aviation regulations in 1921, forming a state-owned Civil Air Fleet in 1923 which became known as Aeroflot in 1932. Other communist states followed a similar pattern in establishing state-controlled entities for civil aviation, such as the Civil Aviation Administration of China in the People's Republic of China and Interflug in East Germany.

==== United States ====
In the United States, the Air Mail Act of 1925 and the Civil Aeronautics Act of 1938 formed the early basis for regulation of domestic air transportation. The United States established a Federal Aviation Agency in 1958, which became the Federal Aviation Administration, a unit of the newly formed United States Department of Transportation, in 1967. The Airline Deregulation Act of 1978 was a watershed in the U.S. air transportation industry, and it greatly increased the regulatory workload of the FAA as new operators were allowed to apply for operating certificates.

==== Japan ====
Japan enacted a legal regime governing civil aviation in 1952, after a brief moratorium during the occupation that followed World War II. While the early domestic air travel market was lightly regulated and highly competitive, the government implemented a regulation system in 1970 which limited service to three carriers (Japan Airlines, All Nippon Airways and Japan Air System), with largely separate markets and strictly regulated fare levels that minimized competition. Pressure from the United States, which sought to introduce new U.S. carriers to the transpacific market in the 1980s, led Japan to gradually deregulate its market in the form of cheap packaged-tour fares and an increased international role for ANA in the 1980s and 1990s, followed by the advent of new domestic carriers such as Skymark Airlines and Air Do.

== Notable aviation lawyers ==
- Kenneth Beaumont
- Stephen Latchford
- Mary Schiavo
