= Stephen Latchford =

American aviation lawyer (1883–1974)

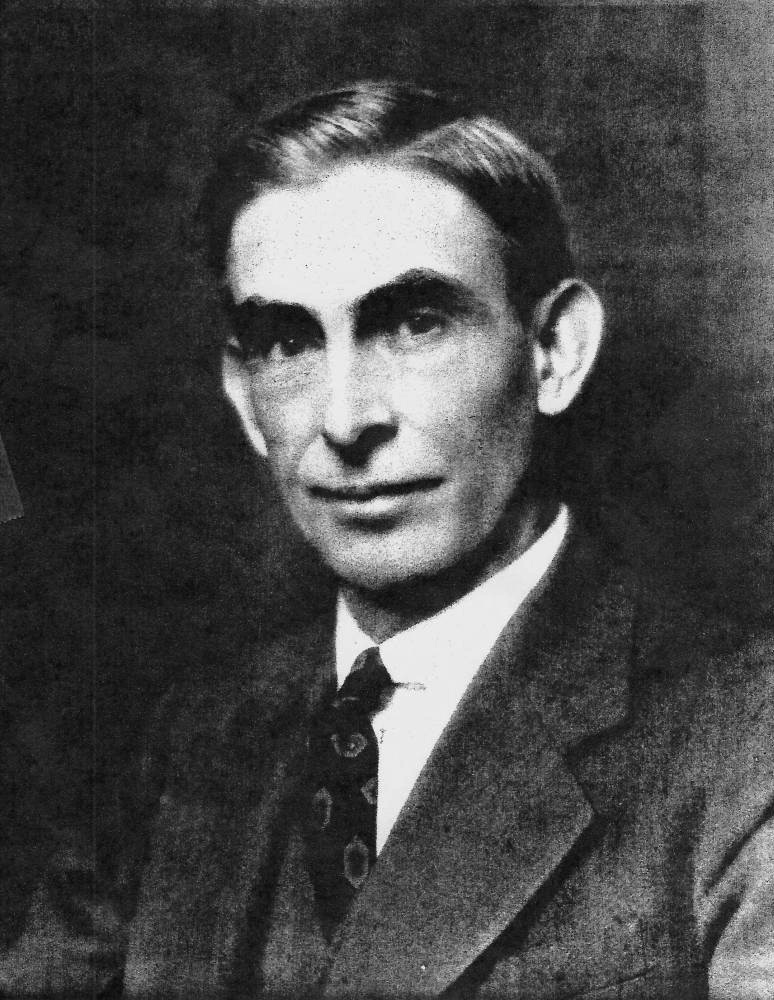
- Stephen Latchford in 1960
- Born: February 4, 1883; Annapolis Junction, Maryland, U.S.
- Died: October 1, 1974 (aged 91); Vienna, Virginia, U.S.
- Resting place: Mount Olivet Cemetery; Washington, D.C., U.S.
- Education: Washington College of Law
- Occupations: U.S. Diplomat, Lawyer, Aviation Law Expert
- Employer(s): United States Foreign Service, U.S. State Department
- Known for: American expert on air laws
- Spouse: Marie Leola Spalding
- Children: 5

Stephen Latchford (February 4, 1883 – October 1, 1974) was a United States diplomat, lawyer and one of America's earliest experts in aviation law. A federal government employee, Latchford started as a clerk working in the Panama Canal Zone. For the next forty years, he rose through the ranks of the U.S. Foreign Service to become one of its most senior members.

During the late 1930s and throughout the 1940s he had a major influence on the role of aviation in America and was a main contributor in the development of international air laws. He served as a government adviser on air law during World War II and played a crucial role in preparation and planning for the Marshall Plan.

Latchford is best known for being one of the principal aviation experts during the administrations of Franklin D. Roosevelt and Harry S Truman and for his extensive work in the American Section of the International Technical Committee of Aerial Legal Experts, commonly known as CITEJA (an abbreviation taken from the initials for its French name, Comité International Technique d'Experts Juridiques Aérien.)

== Childhood and early life ==
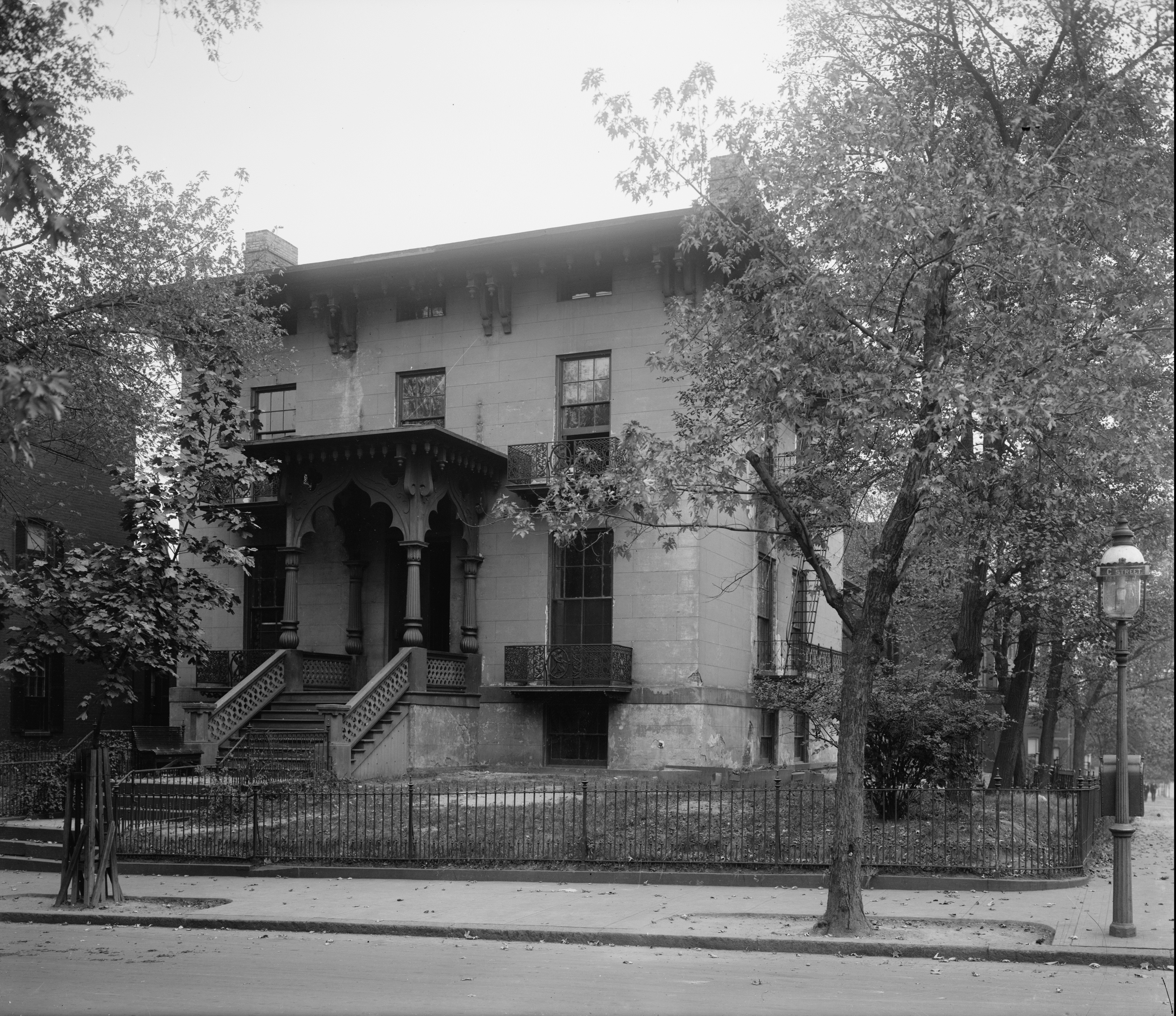
The Maulsby Working Boys' House in Washington, D.C., 1935

Stephen Latchford was born on February 4, 1883, to George G. Latchford, a B&O Railroad operator in Annapolis Junction, Maryland, and his wife, Miranda. He received his early education at public schools in Annapolis Junction, but never attended high school. As a young teenager, he left home and went to Washington, D.C., to find work.

His first job was at a tobacco store close to the Capitol Building, where he earned $4 a week. During his early years in D.C., he lived with other young boys at the Maulsby Working Boy's Home. Latchford became a member of the Home's debating team, the Working Boys Literary and Debating Club.

At age 18, he learned to use a typewriter and started working as a clerk in commercial houses. In March 1901, his father died while visiting in Washington.

Latchford then worked as a typewriter and stenographer in law offices from 1904 to 1905. He also attended a business college in Washington.

== Career ==
=== Panama Canal ===
In 1905 Latchford took the civil service examination and after passing it applied for a job at the Isthmian Canal Commission which he obtained. For the next six years (1905–1911), Latchford worked as a clerk in the Panama Canal Zone.

=== State Department career ===
Upon returning to the United States in 1911, Latchford transferred on August 19, 1911, to the U.S. State Department's Diplomatic Bureau. He later moved to the Division of Latin-American Affairs as it expanded and performed clerical tasks on diplomatic and consular correspondence on matters relating to Mexico, Central America, Panama, South America, and the West Indies.

By 1915, he was working at the Division of Mexican Affairs as a clerk, where he was promoted as a clerk to 'Class One', in 1916, to 'Class Two', and in 1918 to "Class Three'.

==== State Department lawyer ====
Latchford took a course in commercial law from the International Correspondence Schools of Scranton, Pennsylvania. Soon afterwards, he applied to the Washington College of Law. He was initially rejected as he had not completed high school. after passing AN equivalency test, he was accepted as a student.

He received his Bachelors in Law degree (LL.B.) from the Washington College of Law in 1920 and was admitted to the Bar of the District of Columbia in October of that year. In 1921, also from the Washington College of Law, he received his Master in Law degree (LL.M.).

Latchford moved to the Office of the Solicitor and began a quick rise through its ranks. On November 1, 1923, he was promoted to an Assistant Solicitor and six months later, on July 1, 1924, became a member of the State Department's Scientific and Professional Service. On February 1, 1926, he was named 'Assistant to the Solicitor' and held the title for the next two years.

=== Aviation expert and the CITEJA ===
After rising through the State Department ranks consistently from 1928 to 1934, Latchford turned towards aviation law, a little explored aspect of law at the time.

By the late 1920s, as aviation expanded and special laws became necessary for its growth and development, the International Technical Committee of Aerial Legal Experts (CITEJA) was founded in Paris in 1926 by a resolution adopted at the First International Conference of Private Air Law and was tasked with the establishment of an organized and uniform set of laws that would later be the basis of air laws worldwide.

Initially, the United States began sending only unofficial advisers to CITEJA meetings, but in 1934, the US government took on a more active role in dealing with the CITEJA. With Latchford's appointment as a member of the American Section at the CITEJA, the U.S. adopted an ever-greater role in global aviation conferences and affairs in the years leading up to the Second World War. Latchford subsequently played a major role in shaping American air laws and is regarded as one of America's earliest experts of aviation law.

Latchford was also a member of the State Department's Committee on International Civil Aviation from 1935 to 1938. During the time, he also served as Assistant Executive Secretary at the Interdepartmental Committee on International Civil Aviation. Over the years, he worked with airline entrepreneur Juan Trippe, President and Founder of Pan American Airways, as the two collaborated to develop and create a code of practical and viable air laws. Latchford was instrumental to the State Department efforts that propelled Pan American to become one of the world's most prominent airlines of the twentieth century, serving as chairman of U.S. delegations to CITEJA sessions and as U.S. representative at the United States-Canada Aviation Conference held at Washington, D.C. in 1938 and again in Ottawa in 1939.

In March 1938, President Roosevelt appointed Latchford the State Department's "Expert on Air Laws" and promoted him to Chairman of the American Section at the International Technical Committee of Aerial Legal Experts. Latchford remained in his capacity as Chairman of the American Section throughout CITEJA's existence, representing the United States for nearly a decade until CITEJA's dismantlement in the late 1940s. He was elevated to Chief of the State Department's Aviation Section in August 1938.

Latchford developed extensive knowledge in maritime law as it overlapped in many aspects with aviation law. Roosevelt named him Vice Chairman of the American Delegation to the 4th International Conference on Private Air Law held at Brussels in 1938, the last international conference on private air law before the outbreak of WWII. It produced a number of resolutions that ultimately led to the unification of both aviation and maritime laws on key issues.

=== Late career and retirement ===
Latchford served once as President of the Panama Canal Society of Washington.

The arrival of World War II marked a new chapter in aviation. On March 18, 1943, with the war raging on, Latchford's authority at the State Department amplified as he was promoted to Grade 7 as a Head Professional and named 'Advisor of Air Law'. He also took part in the Permanent American Aeronautical Commission meeting as a member in the United States Commission in 1944.

At the historic 1944 Chicago Convention, in which 52 states and 190 parties took part in and which shaped the role of aviation worldwide, Latchford served as an adviser to the United States delegation. He was the driving force behind the first draft on the convention on international civil aviation that was adopted by the Chicago Conference. Among the conference's most significant outcomes was the formation of the Provisional International Civil Aviation Organization (PICAO). The Chicago Convention furthermore led to the establishment of what would become the International Civil Aviation Organization (ICAO), a specialized agency of the United Nations that exists to this day.

Although the work of the CITEJA was generally limited during the war, a few conferences did take place with the support of the French government. Latchford was by then functioning as a legal advisor to newly appointed Secretary George Marshall and assisted in the launching of the Marshall Plan. He, in particular, worked the legal angle, thus allowing for the shipment of American aid to devastated European nations after the defeat of Germany in 1945.

In 1946, members of the CITEJA convened in Paris to discuss the effect of the war and its predicaments and the future of the organization. Latchford personally traveled to Paris to head the U.S. delegation to the meeting, the first time since he had been appointed Chairman of the CITEJA's American Section.

On July 30, 1948, Latchford retired at the age of 65 after working nearly four decades at the State Department.

== Death ==
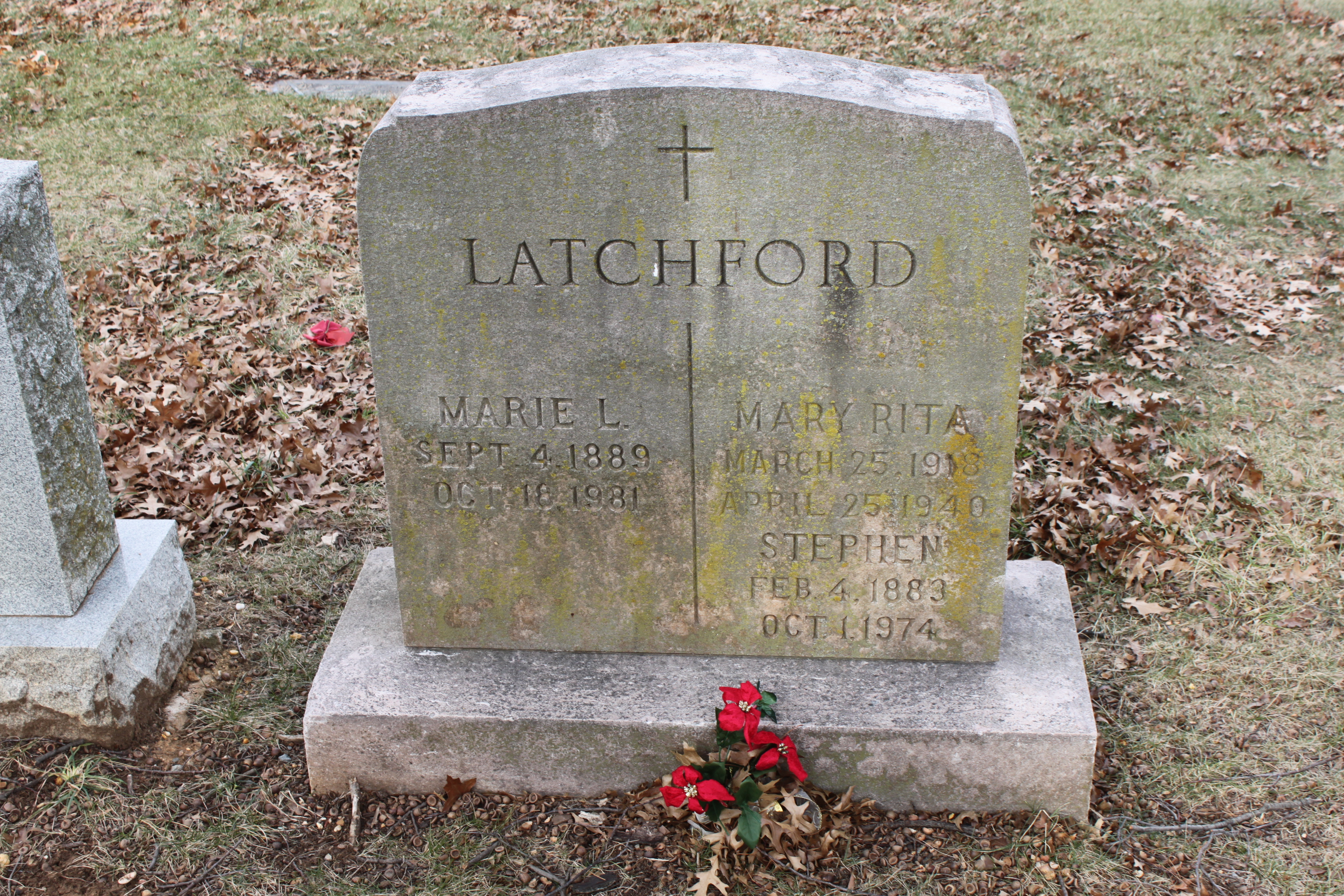
Grave of Latchford at Mount Olivet Cemetery

Latchford's health began to decline in late 1974 and he was placed in a nursing home. On October 1, 1974, Latchford died at the age of 91. He is buried at Mount Olivet Cemetery in Washington beside his daughter and wife.

== Personal life ==
Latchford married Marie Leola Spalding, the daughter of Basil William Spalding, a Confederate Civil War hero from Southern Maryland. Together the couple had five children.

== See also ==
- Warsaw Convention
- Aviation law
- Civil Aviation Authority
- Chicago Convention
