= Annapolis Junction, Maryland =

Unincorporated community in Maryland, United States

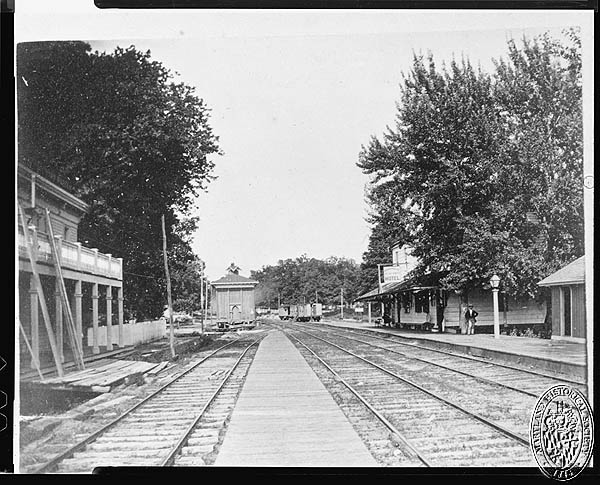

- Location within the U.S. state of Maryland Annapolis Junction (the United States)
- Coordinates: 39°7′26″N 76°47′31″W
- Country: United States of America
- State: Maryland
- Counties: Anne Arundel, Howard
- Time zone: UTC−5 (Eastern (EST))
  - Summer (DST): UTC−4 (EDT)
- Zip code: 20701

Annapolis Junction is an unincorporated community in Howard and Anne Arundel counties, Maryland, United States.

== Demographics ==
The ZIP Code for Annapolis Junction is 20701. The following information is based on the 2000 Census for 20701:

- Population: 40
- Median age: 31.5 years
- Single family homes: 6

== History ==
The lands of Annapolis Junction were first settled around 1650. Provincial Assembly of Maryland member and Anne Arundel County Justice Colonel Henry Ridgely (1645–1710) surveyed the land around Annapolis Junction and nearby Savage Mill in 1685 naming the tract "Ridgely's Forrest".

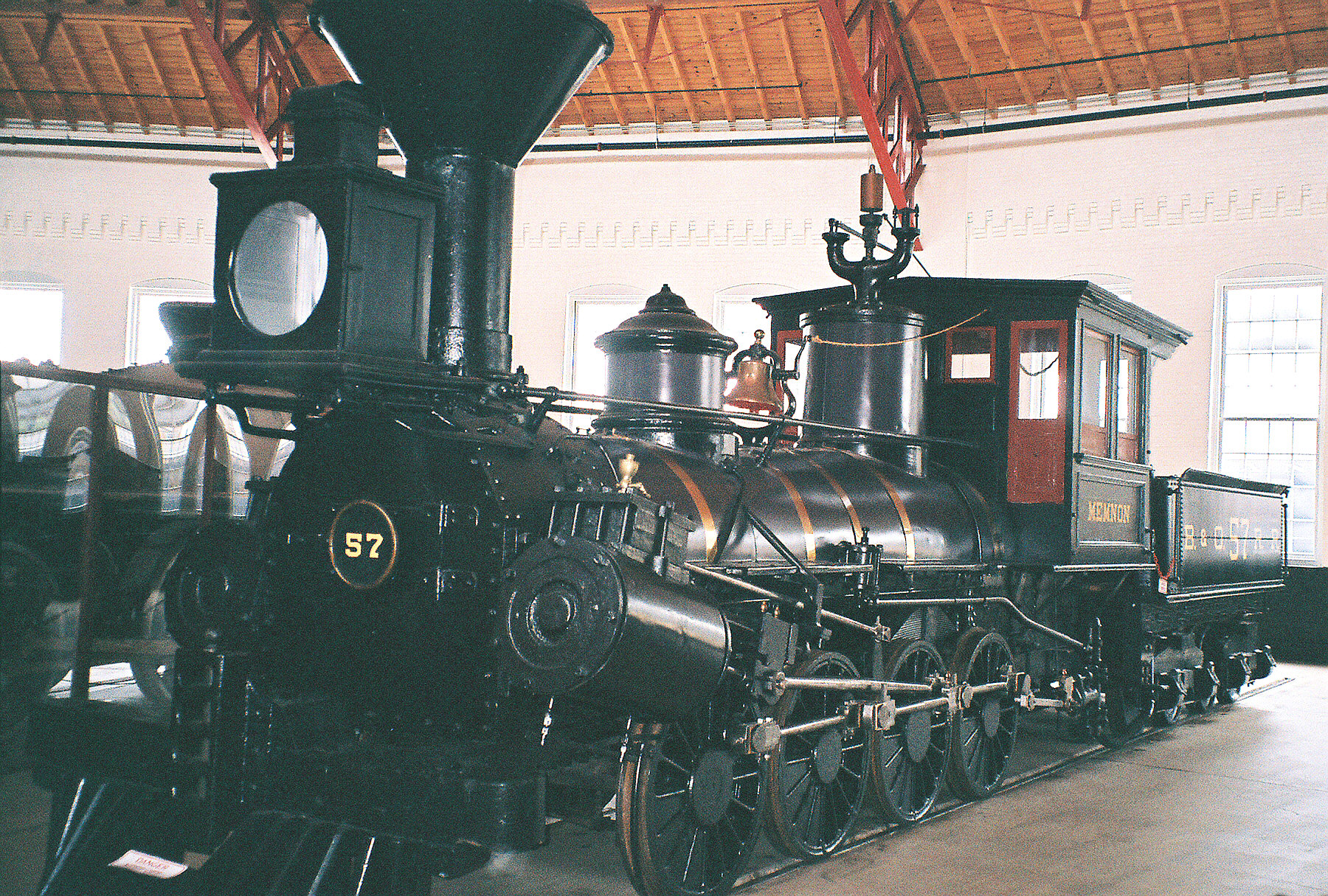
An 1848 vintage 0-8-0 Locomotive

Annapolis Junction was established as a rail junction on the north-south mainline of the Baltimore and Ohio Railroad (B&O) when the tracks of the Annapolis and Elk Ridge Railroad terminated here in 1840. Since this provided a rail route to Annapolis from Washington and Baltimore via the B&O, it was, therefore, a junction to Annapolis. On August 26, 1844 the Annapolis Junction post office opened.

On May 1, 1844, in a small wooden building along the railroad tracks, the first practical news telegram was sent from Annapolis Junction. The message, from Alfred Vail to Samuel F. B. Morse, announced that the Whig Party candidate would be Henry Clay, and his running mate would be Theodore Frelinghuysen. The candidates left Annapolis Junction by train, and arrived in Washington to find the news was already being announced in the city by the local papers.

Annapolis Junction is the site of William Bowie's home Grassland, built in 1853.

=== Annapolis Junction in the Civil War ===
Located along the B&O Railroad, the main East Coast thoroughfare for North-South freight railroad traffic and the only rail line into Washington, Annapolis Junction was witness to the comings and goings of the Civil War.

Traveling in secret to avoid an assassination plot in Baltimore, Abraham Lincoln passed through Annapolis Junction en route to Washington for his 1861 inauguration.

During the war, George G. Latchford owned and operated a large hotel, known as the Howard House, along the B&O Railroad tracks.

General Butler recounts: "In route to Washington D.C. we could not sail into the Potomac, and the rail line from Annapolis to Annapolis Junction was the only route in. Troops were unwelcome in Annapolis, finding reluctance to provide provisions, and locomotives disabled to prevent their travel."

The 7th New York Militia, and the Fifth German Regiment under Col Schwartzwaelder, arrived in May 1861. The soldiers slept on wet ground, were lacking equipment and even boots. Their meals consisted of hard biscuits, tough meat, and "salt beyond description." Monthly pay was $11, but the paymaster did not have any money to give out. Col. Zadock Pratt delivered 6 firkins of his own butter, and his wife gave $250 of her own money to the troops.

In August, 1861, $4975 in goods were seized at Annapolis Junction from southern sympathizers in Baltimore.

Brig.-Gen. John C. Robinson commanded troops guarding the B&O railroad in 1862. The First Michigan Regiment was assigned to the sections south of Annapolis Junction, and the Tenth Maine Regiment was posted for points north.

In 1863, Annapolis Junction formed the northern boundary of coverage for the XXII Corps (Union Army) Department of Washington, and became the rendezvous point for drafted men from Maryland. In July, 1863, a large force of Fitzhugh Lee's Cavalry was thought to have struck the rail lines.

The tracks were guarded from June to July 1864 by the 144th Ohio Infantry. The guard of 100 troops reportedly fled when a small band of rebels were within 12 miles (19 km) of the vicinity. In a letter to the editor, on July 24, 1864, the writer complains that the 65 troops did not run off, but instead were following orders of Mag Gen. Ord to leave the area before the arrival of the entire rebel army.

=== Post Civil War ===
In the age of rail, presidential sightings were common in town. In June 1867, President Andrew Johnson met with Maryland Governor Thomas Swann at Annapolis Junction where he received the resolutions of the Maryland Constitutional Convention.

In 1867, the First Regiment of the Lincoln Zouaves Corps de Afrique held a political rally at Annapolis Junction with 400 musketmen listening to radical speeches from J.J Stewart, Judge Bond, and others.

On June 12, 1869, a northbound train struck a wandering cow at Annapolis Junction, derailing and injuring 30 passengers. The train was a night express carrying President Ulysses S. Grant, his wife, and the Secretary of Treasury George S. Boutwell, who all escaped uninjured.

On 29 November 1871, the Annapolis Junction post office moved to the Howard County side of the railroad tracks.

In May, 1899, The National Junior Republic was founded as an institution for troubled 15- to 20-year-olds. By 1914, the facility housed 44 inmates. By 1924, the site was abandoned and overgrown.

=== World War I ===
In June, 1917, Secretary of War Newton D. Baker announced that 17,000 acres (69 km^{2}) would be bought at Annapolis Junction to accommodate a National Army Cantonment to train 40,000 to 60,000 men for at least one year. The encampment would eventually become Fort George G. Meade. On October 7, 1919, the post office for Annapolis Junction moved back to the Anne Arundel side of the tracks, only to return to Howard County in September 1921.

=== Post WWI ===
After the establishment of Fort Meade, Annapolis Junction was sometime referred to as Fort Meade Junction.

=== Post WWII ===
No longer an actual railroad junction, Annapolis Junction has developed into a town with four major features. The historic and still busy CSX (former B&O) railroad line runs north to south, Maryland Route 32 runs east to west, various office warehouses lie to the west, and facilities relating to Fort Meade lie to the east. Although a historic location, Annapolis Junction is now mostly zoned industrial, and overshadowed by nearby Fort Meade.

The National Cryptologic Museum's GPS address and physical location are usually referred to as "Annapolis Junction", though its mailing address is maintained by NSA.

Few residents call Annapolis Junction "home," more frequently associating themselves with adjacent Savage, its southern neighbor Laurel, or Fort Meade.

Annapolis Junction also serves as the location of the rail transfer facility that moves Howard County's waste to King George County, Virginia. Officially named Annapolis Junction Recycling & Transfer Station, it was created in the late 1990s by developer Blake Van Leer.

The State of Maryland built a park and ride MARC Train commuter platform near the original Annapolis Junction station, called Savage MARC. In 2014, Howard County executive Ken Ulman announced that the park and ride land would be sold to private developers in order to increase the tax base. Howard County provided $17 million to build a 700 unit parking garage onsite. The 416 unit apartment complex project was renamed to Annapolis Junction Town Center. The facility is next to the 200 bus capacity Regional Transportation Agency of Central Maryland terminal building constructed the same year.

== Government and infrastructure ==
The Federal Bureau of Prisons operates its Mid-Atlantic Regional Office in Annapolis Junction.

== Economy ==
Colfax Corporation a major welding, air and gas handling equipment, and medical devices manufacturer is based in Annapolis Junction.

== Notable person ==
Stephen Latchford was a United States diplomat and expert in aviation laws.
