= Evergreen State College =

Public liberal arts college in Olympia, Washington, US

The Evergreen State College
- Motto: Omnia Extares (Latin)
- Motto in English: "Let it all hang out"
- Type: Public liberal arts college
- Established: 1967; 59 years ago
- Accreditation: NWCCU
- Academic affiliations: COPLAC
- Endowment: $19.5 million (2023)
- President: John Carmichael
- Provost: Noah Coburn
- Faculty: 86 full-time (2023); 84 adjunct (2023); 7 part-time (2023)
- Administrative staff: 84 (2023)
- Students: 2,505 (fall 2024)
- Postgraduates: 209 (fall 2024)
- Location: Thurston County, Washington, U.S. 47°04′23″N 122°58′34″W
- Campus: 1,000 acres (400 ha); Midsize suburb
- Newspaper: The Cooper Point Journal
- Colors: Green and white
- Nickname: Geoduck
- Sporting affiliations: NAIA – CCC
- Mascot: Speedy the Geoduck
- Website: evergreen.edu
- Interactive map of College location

The Evergreen State College is a public liberal arts college in Thurston County, Washington, with an Olympia postal address. Founded in 1967, and offering classes in the fall of 1971, it offers a non-traditional undergraduate curriculum in which students have the option to design their own degree or follow a predetermined path of study. Full-time students can enroll in interdisciplinary academic programs, in addition to individual courses. Programs typically offer students the opportunity to study several disciplines in a coordinated manner. Faculty write substantive narrative evaluations of students' work in place of issuing grades.

Evergreen's main campus, which includes its own saltwater beach, spans 1,000 acres of forest close to the southern end of Puget Sound. Evergreen also has a satellite campus in nearby Tacoma. The school offers the Bachelor of Arts, Bachelor of Science, Master of Environmental Studies, Master in Teaching, Master of Public Administration, and Sustainability Masters of Business Administration degrees.

Evergreen was one of many alternative colleges and programs launched in the 1960s and 1970s, often described as experiments. While the vast majority of these have either closed or adopted more mainstream approaches, Evergreen continues to teach a non-traditional curriculum.

== History ==
In 1964, a report was issued by the Council of Presidents of Washington State baccalaureate institutions stating that another college was needed in the state to balance the geographical distribution of the existing state institutions. This report spurred the 1965 Washington legislature to create the Temporary Advisory Council on Public Higher Education to study the need and possible location for a new state college.

In 1965–66, the Temporary Advisory Council on Public Higher Education (assisted by Nelson Associates of New York) concluded that "at the earliest possible time a new college should be authorized", to be located at a suburban site in Thurston County within a radius of approximately 10 miles (16 km) from Olympia. Evergreen's enabling legislation – HB 596 (Chapter 47, Laws of 1967) – stated that the campus should be no smaller than 600 acres (240 ha), making it then the largest campus in the state as well as the first public four-year college created in Washington in the 20th century.

On January 24, 1968, "The Evergreen State College" was selected from 31 choices as the name of the new institution. On November 1, 1968, Charles J. McCann assumed the first presidency of the college. McCann and the founding faculty held the first day of classes October 4, 1971, with 1,128 students. McCann served from 1968 until stepping down to join the faculty June 6, 1977, when former Governor Daniel J. Evans, who signed the legislation creating Evergreen, assumed the presidency. Evans left the president's office in 1983 when he was appointed to the United States Senate to fill the vacancy caused by the death of senator Henry M. Jackson. The largest building on campus is named in honor of Evans, the Daniel J. Evans Library. The entrance to the campus bears McCann's name, the Charles J. McCann plaza.

In 1972, Maxine Mimms began teaching students in her kitchen in the Hilltop neighborhood of Tacoma WA. She was teaching full-time at Evergreen and wanted to expand Evergreen's teachings to underserved individuals in her community. In 1982 the program was formally established and in 2001 Evergreen Tacoma moved into it's permanent home on Tacoma's 6th Avenue.

In the 1992–93 school year, students chose Leonard Peltier to give the address at commencement, which was the first with a graduating class of more than 1,000. The selection was described as "perhaps the most unconventional commencement speaker" in a published round-up of the most controversial graduation speakers on campuses nationwide that year. Peltier, who was in federal prison, submitted his remarks in writing, to be read by a graduating senior.

In 1999, Mumia Abu-Jamal was invited to deliver the keynote address by audiotape for the graduating class at the college. The event was protested by some.

In 2004, the college completed the 170,000-square-foot (16,000 m^{2}) Seminar II building, as well as a significant remodeling of the Daniel J Evans Library.

In 2015, George Sumner Bridges became the sixth president of The Evergreen State College, not counting interim appointments. Bridges had previously served as president of Whitman College in Walla Walla, Washington. He followed Thomas L. "Les" Purce (2000–2015), Jane L. Jervis (1992–2000), and Joseph D. Olander (1985–1990).

On December 11, 2023, 21-year-old Evergreen student Jonathan Rodriguez died of carbon monoxide poisoning in an on-campus modular apartment; two other students and a responding campus police officer were hospitalized. A Washington State Patrol investigation found that a tankless water heater installed the previous week had not been connected to standard, and that carbon monoxide detectors had activated earlier the same day but were silenced and reset by maintenance staff, who treated them as faulty rather than as a genuine event. In response, Evergreen discontinued propane-fueled housing units, revised its alarm-response and after-hours emergency protocols, and allocated $1 million to housing safety improvements; the two contractors who installed the heater were later charged with second-degree manslaughter, and the State of Washington agreed in 2024 to a $25 million settlement with Rodriguez's family.

=== 2017 protests ===
From the 1970s onward, Evergreen held an annual "Day of Absence", inspired by Douglas Turner Ward's play of the same name, in which minority students and faculty voluntarily stayed off campus to highlight the contributions of people of color and discuss racial issues; since 1992 it had been paired with a "Day of Presence" reuniting the campus. In 2017, following concerns raised by students of color after the 2016 US presidential election and a 2015 off-campus police shooting, organizers reversed the format so that white students, staff, and faculty were invited to participate in an off-campus program while students of color held activities on campus.

Biology professor Bret Weinstein objected to the change in an email to faculty, drawing a distinction between a group voluntarily absenting itself from a shared space and a group being asked to leave. In late May, student protesters disrupted classes, occupied the office of President George Bridges, and demanded a series of changes including Weinstein's resignation. Campus police informed Weinstein that they could not guarantee his safety on campus, and he held a class in a public park; he and his wife, professor Heather Heying, subsequently resigned and received a combined $500,000 settlement from the college.

A direct threat to campus on June 1 prompted a two-day closure, and protesters caused an estimated $10,000 in property damage. A June 15 demonstration by the far-right group Patriot Prayer led to another early closure, and the 2017 commencement was relocated off-campus. Coverage by right-leaning media outlets drew sustained national attention to the college, and several African American students, staff, and faculty reported receiving harassing and threatening messages in the months that followed.

Evergreen's enrollment, which had already been declining for a decade, fell sharply in subsequent years — from 3,881 students in 2017 to 1,952 by February 2022 — forcing a 10% budget cut and increased student fees. Enrollment began to recover in 2022 with 14% year-over-year growth, followed by 23% growth in 2023 that brought the total to 2,225.

== Academics ==
Undergraduate demographics as of Fall 2023
Race and ethnicity	Total
White	57%
Hispanic	15%
Two or more races	9%
Unknown	7%
Black	6%
American Indian/Alaska Native	3%
Asian	2%
Economic diversity
Low-income (Note: The percentage of students who received an income-based federal Pell grant intended for low-income students.)	44%
Affluent (Note: The percentage of students who are a part of the American middle class at the bare minimum.)	56%

=== Undergraduate ===
Undergraduate students select one 16-credit program for the entire quarter rather than multiple courses. Full-time programs will encompass a quarter's worth of work in everything related to that program concentration, by up to three professors. There are no majors; students have the freedom to choose what program to enroll in each quarter for the entire duration of their undergraduate education, and are not required to follow a specific set of programs. Evergreen is on the "quarter" system, with programs lasting one, two, or three quarters. Three-quarter programs are generally September through June.

Evergreen has been featured in Colleges That Change Lives.

At the end of the program, the professor writes a one-page report ("Evaluation") about the student's activity in the class rather than awarding a letter grade, and has an end-of-program evaluation conference with each student. The professor also determines how many credits should be awarded to the student, and students can lose credit.

In order to be granted a Bachelor of Science degree, a student must complete 180 credits, 72 of which need to be in science, with 48 of those noted as upper division. This upper division requirement can be satisfied by one year of full-time upper-division science studies.

Evergreen offers an evening and weekend programs and courses.

=== Graduate ===
Unlike the undergraduate programs, the graduate programs require a student to take a certain rotation of courses. Evergreen graduate studies consist of the following programs:

- Master of Environmental Studies
- Master in Teaching
- Master of Public Administration
- Sustainability Master of Business Administration

== Rankings ==
Academic rankings

Master's
- Washington Monthly: 32

Regional
- U.S. News & World Report: 67

Among regional universities in the western United States, U.S. News & World Report in its 2027 edition ranked Evergreen tied for 170th among "National Liberal Arts Colleges", tied for 23rd among "Top Public Schools", and tied for 47th among "Most Innovative Schools".

In 2025, Washington Monthly ranked Evergreen 32nd among master's universities nationally, including 13th in its "outcomes" category. The magazine had ranked Evergreen first in the same category in 2022.

The Evergreen State College has an acceptance rate of 96%.

== Facilities ==
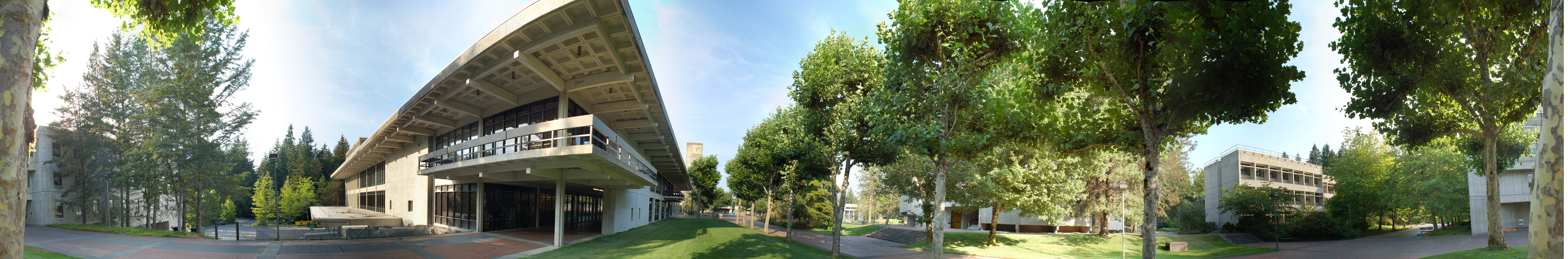
360° panorama on the campus of the Evergreen State College near Olympia, Washington. This panorama features the Daniel J. Evans Library and the clock tower set in a brick courtyard lined with trees.

The campus is in unincorporated Thurston County, Washington.

=== Daniel J. Evans Library ===
The Daniel J. Evans Library, named after the former governor who signed the legislation that founded Evergreen, and was also the school's second president. The library is home to some 428,000 volumes and 750,000 print and media items overall. The library hosts a number of small viewing rooms and also maintains special collections of rare books, archival material, and government documents. The Math and Science Center and the Writing Center are located on the first floor of the library. The library is located in the Information Technology wing of Evans Hall. This wing is also the home for Media Services and a large Academic Computing center.

=== Costantino Recreation Center ===
The Costantino Recreation Center has a large gym and a bouldering wall. It is open for use by students and faculty of The Evergreen State College and also provides access to the community for a nominal fee. Evergreen's pool and diving well closed on June 6, 2026, after the college cited rising operating costs, a projected budget shortfall, and a state-mandated repair to the pool drains; the closure was originally scheduled for June 30. The college has said it will not make a long-term decision about the facility for at least a year and that reopening the pool remains under consideration.

=== Environmental reserve and beach ===
The Evergreen State College has 1,000 acres (400 ha) of land that is mostly second growth forest. The entire campus serves as a natural laboratory for scientific field research and provides inspiration for creative work. Throughout the 1,000-acre (400 ha) forest there are multiple trails leading to a variety of locations throughout the reserve and to Geoduck Beach. The coastal habitat is characterized by steep bluffs, gravelly beaches with many washed-up logs, and the marine intertidal zone which extends up to 150 feet (46 m) out into Puget Sound's Eld Inlet during low tides. Evergreen has approximately 3,300 feet (1.0 km) of untouched beach and 27 acres (11 ha) of southern Puget Sound tidelands. Students use the beach and tidelands for scientific study and as a place to get away from their studies and relax. There are multiple trails leading to the beach and a small road that leads to the only building at the beach and a small boat ramp. The bluffs range from 15 to 60 feet (5 to 20 m) in height.

=== Organic farm ===
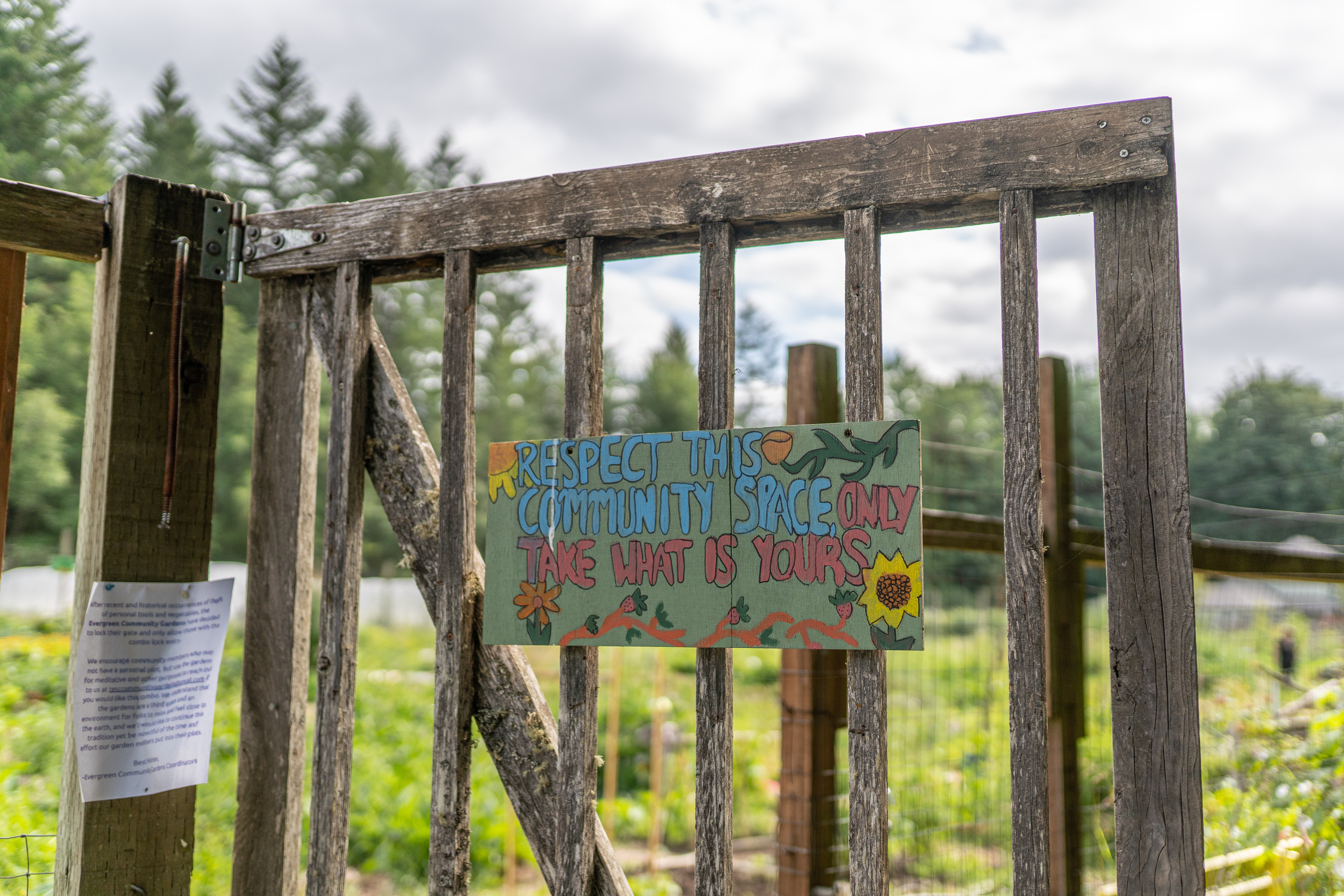
Sign on a gate at the Organic Farm

The Organic Farm annual crop bed space comprises 38,000 square feet (0.35 ha), slightly less than 1 acre (0.40 ha). The farm also produces apples and other perennial food crops, and tends to a flock of hens. Produce is sold to the Evergreen community through CSA (Community Supported Agriculture) shares, or from a farm-stand on-campus. Produce is sometimes sold to campus food services, Aramark. Excess produce is available to students in the interdisciplinary program, titled "The Practice of Sustainable Agriculture".

Proceeds from the sale of the crops are used to finance farm projects, as well as purchase seeds and equipment. Two of the greenhouses, the cooler, compost shed, farm fencing and orchard are just a few projects made possible from farm sales. Another use for money generated on the farm is to fund student projects. Many of these projects are related to horticultural aspects of food crops.

The farm production area is divided into sections that are used to delineate cropping areas for specific types of crops. The farm practices a strict five year crop rotation. The rotating of crops creates plant diversity over time as opposed to plant diversity in space. The rotation has four general crop categories with each category occupying a given space for one growing season.

Crop rotation is just one method the farm uses to maintain diversity in the field. Other methods employed are the use of undersown ground covers and inter-cropping different types of vegetable crops. Creating diversity in the field is one of the cornerstones of sustainable agriculture. Diversity provides non-toxic, sustainable crop protection against plant diseases and insect pests.

Evergreen's Organic Farm hosts a large composting facility that composts all compostables from the campus. It also hosts a Biodiesel facility, a community garden, demeters garden, and a large farmhouse that was partially built by students.

=== Public service centers ===
The Evergreen State College is the home of the s'gʷi gʷi ʔ altxʷ: House of Welcome Longhouse and Cultural Education Center. The House of Welcome exists to provide service and hospitality to students, the college, and surrounding Native communities. With a design based on the Northwest Indigenous Nations' philosophy of hospitality, its primary functions are to provide a gathering place for hosting cultural ceremonies, classes, conferences, performances, art exhibits and community events. The House of Welcome provides the opportunity to build a bridge of understanding between the regions' tribes and visitors of all cultures. The public service mission of the Longhouse is to promote indigenous arts and cultures through education, cultural preservation, and economic development.

It is also the administrative home for the Washington State Institute for Public Policy. The institute's mission is to carry out practical, non-partisan research—at legislative direction—on issues of importance to Washington State. The institute conducts research using its own policy analysts and economists, specialists from universities, and consultants. Institute staff work closely with legislators, legislative and state agency staff, and experts in the field to ensure that studies answer relevant policy questions.

Other notable public service centers on campus are:

- Washington Center for Improving the Quality of Undergraduate Education
- Center for Community-Based Learning and Action

== Athletics ==
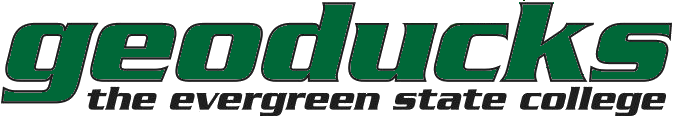
Evergreen State athletics wordmark

The Evergreen State College athletic teams are called the Geoducks. The college is a member of the National Association of Intercollegiate Athletics (NAIA), primarily competing in the Cascade Collegiate Conference (CCC) since the 1999–2000 academic year.

Evergreen competes in nine intercollegiate varsity sports: Men's sports include basketball, cross country, soccer and track & field; while women's sports include basketball, cross country, soccer, track & field and volleyball. Former sports include men's & women's crew.

=== Mascot ===
A geoduck is a clam native to the Puget Sound and can be found on the Olympia campus' beach. The word geoduck comes from the Lushootseed word gʷídəq, meaning “dig deep.” The geoduck mascot was proposed by founding faculty Al Wiedemann at an early faculty meeting.

=== Soccer ===
Former men's soccer star Joey Gjertsen, who led the Geoducks to the 2004 NAIA National Quarterfinals, has gone on to have professional success with the San Jose Earthquakes of Major League Soccer. Shawn Medved previously had success in the MLS, playing for D.C. United and the San Jose Clash. Medved scored the tying goal in the 1996 MLS Cup as D.C. went on to the championship.

=== Basketball ===
Evergreen also had a strong run in men's basketball during the first decade of the 21st century, winning the 2002 CCC Championship and reaching the NAIA National Tournament in 2002, 2009 and 2010. Forward Mike Parker from the '02 team has become one of the top professional players in Japan, and several other basketball players have gone on to professional careers overseas.

== Media ==
=== Student media ===
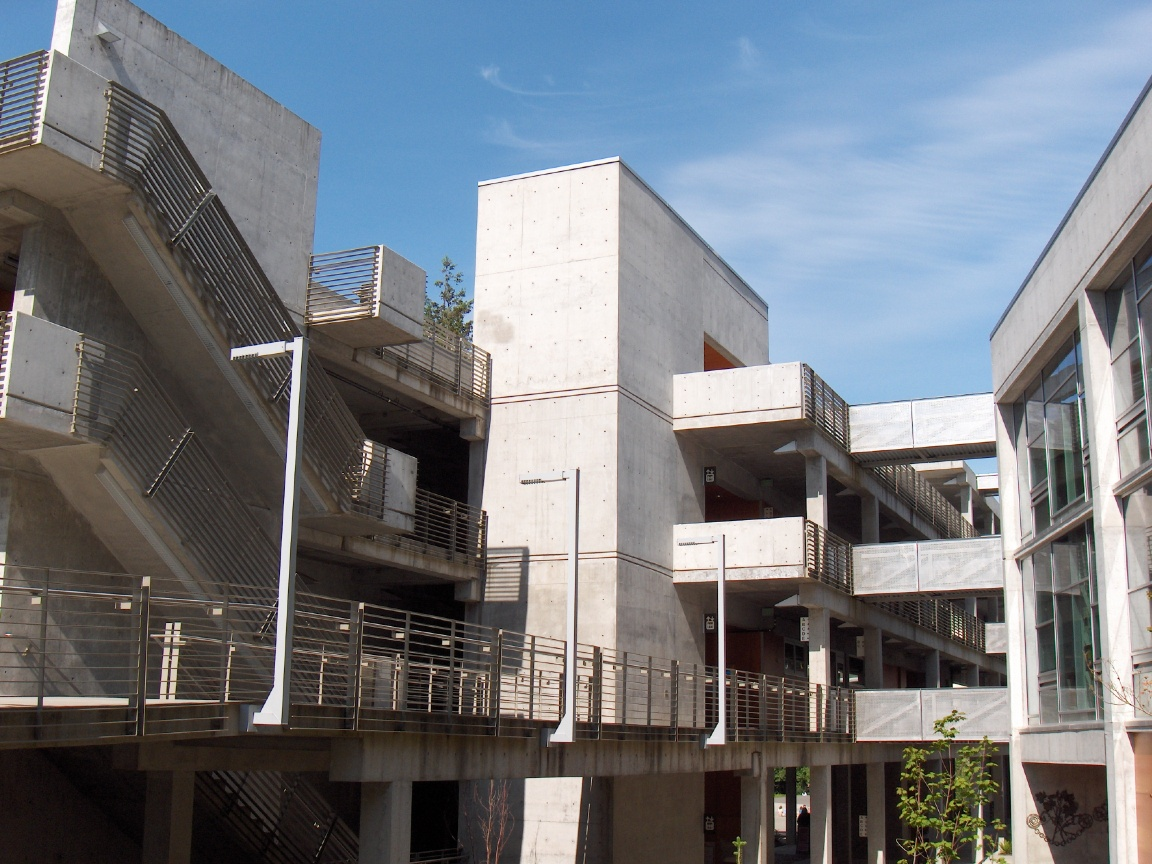
The Seminar II building, completed in 2004

Student media include student-run newspaper The Cooper Point Journal, the literary magazine Slightly West, and Evergreen's community radio station KAOS-FM.

=== The Evergreen State College Press ===
The Evergreen State College Press is a university press affiliated with Evergreen. Major works released by the press include fieldguides like Writing American Cultures (2013) and Vascular Plants of the South Sound Prairies (2016).

== Notable alumni ==
Alumni of The Evergreen State College includes:

- Lynda Barry, cartoonist
- Knute Berger, journalist and television presenter
- Josh Blue, comedian
- Carrie Brownstein, musician
- Rachel Corrie, activist and diarist
- Martin Courtney, musician
- Phil Elverum, musician
- Joey Gjertsen, professional soccer player
- Matt Groening, cartoonist
- Kathleen Hanna, musician
- Denny Heck, Washington Lieutenant Governor
- Benjamin Hoff, writer
- Byron Howard, Oscar-winning director
- Calvin Johnson, K Records founder
- Conrad Keely, musician
- Michael Lavine, photographer
- Macklemore, musician
- Tom Maddox, writer
- Lois Maffeo, musician
- Audrey Marrs, Oscar-winning film producer
- Nikki McClure, artist
- Shawn Medved, professional soccer player
- Myra Melford, musician
- Judith Moore, writer
- Yuh-Line Niou, politician
- Wendy C. Ortiz, writer
- Bruce Pavitt, Sub Pop Records founder
- Michael Richards, comedian
- Paul Stamets, mycologist
- Steve Thomas, reality television star
- Cappy Thompson, artist
- Corin Tucker, musician
- Tobi Vail, musician
- Kathi Wilcox, musician
- Tay Zonday, musician
- Molly Zuckerman-Hartung, artist

== See also ==
- Washington State Institute for Public Policy
- History of Olympia, Washington
