= Grassland (Annapolis Junction, Maryland) =

Historic house in Maryland, United States

- U.S. National Register of Historic Places
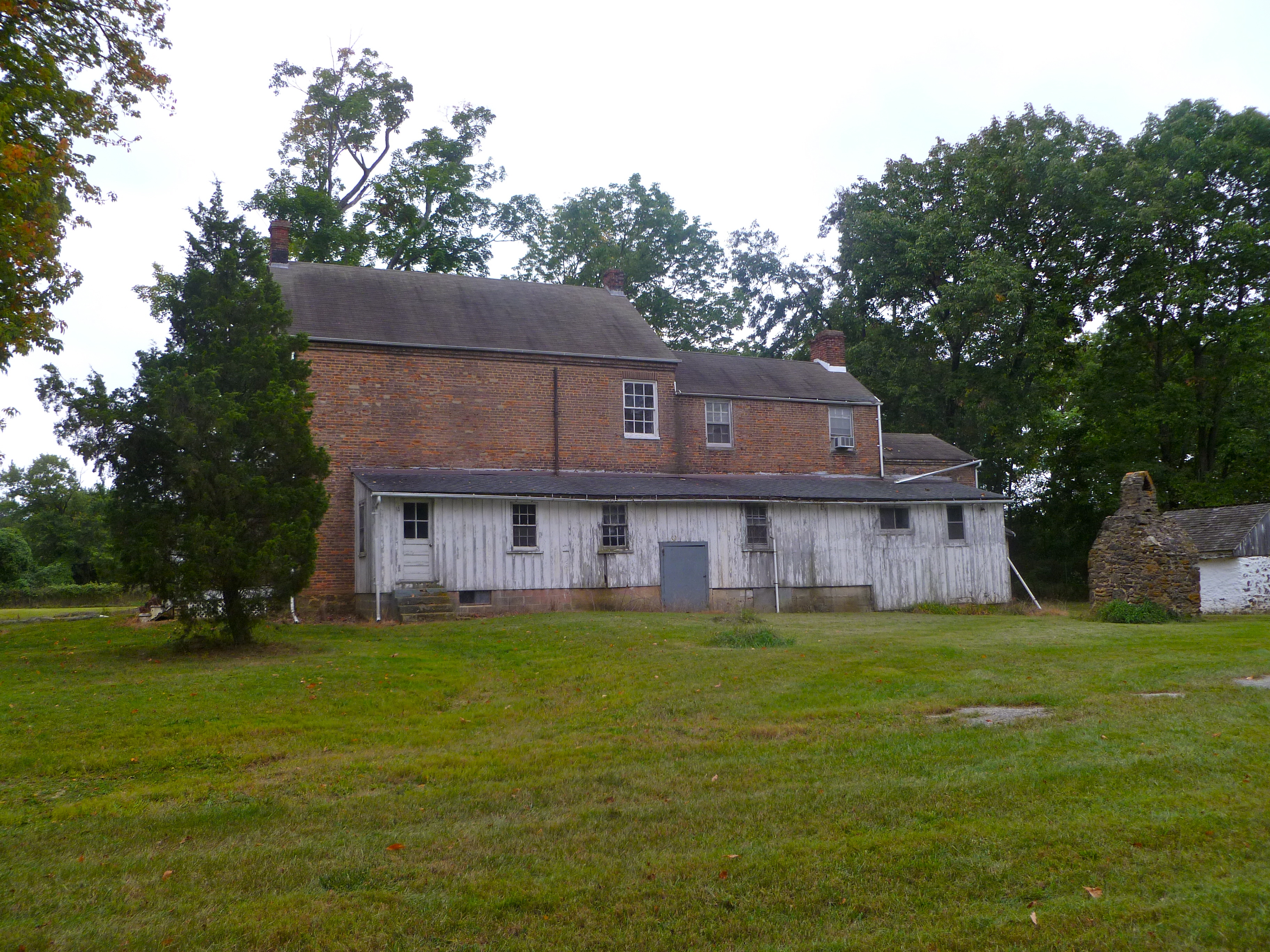

- Location within Maryland Location within the United States
- Nearest city: Hercules Rd., Annapolis Junction, Maryland
- Coordinates: 39°7′6″N 76°46′41″W
- Built: 1852
- NRHP reference No.: 84001331
- Added to NRHP: September 13, 1984

Grassland is a historic house at Annapolis Junction, Anne Arundel County, Maryland. It was built in 1853, and is a three-part brick structure constructed in a telescoping manner. Other structures on the property were erected between 1852 and 1854 by enslaved people: the one-story frame slave house with brick-nogged walls; a small stone smokehouse; the remains of a summer kitchen; and a frame harness shed, storage shed, and the ruins of a bank barn.

It was listed on the National Register of Historic Places in 1984.

As of January 2023, the property is overgrown with weeds and tall grass. The buildings located here at this site also appear to be in total disrepair.
