= USS PCS-1405 =

Minesweeper of the United States Navy

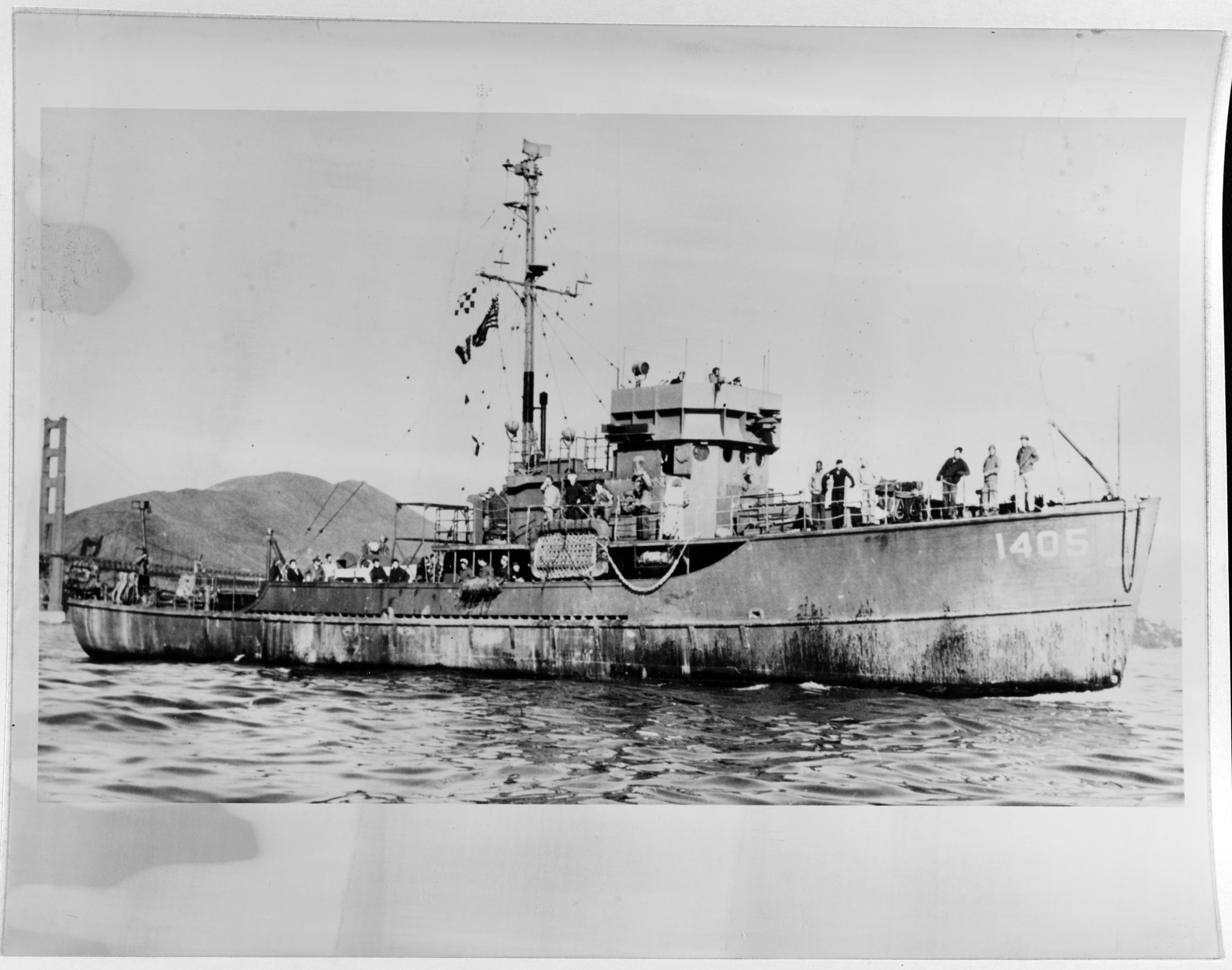
- USS PCS-1405 in San Francisco Bay, California, c. 1945-46

History

United States Navy
- Name: USS PC-1405
- Builder: Greenport Basin and Construction Company, Greenport, New York
- Laid down: 1 May 1943
- Renamed: USS PCS-1405, April 1943
- Reclassified: Patrol craft sweeper (PCS), April 1943
- Launched: 21 August 1943
- Commissioned: 1 February 1944
- Decommissioned: August 1946
- Stricken: February 1947
- Fate: Transferred to U.S. Coast and Geodetic Survey 3 October 1946

History

U.S. Coast and Geodetic Survey
- Name: USC&GS Bowie (CSS 27)
- Namesake: Captain William Bowie (1872–1940), U.S. Coast and Geodetic Survey Corps officer
- Acquired: 3 October 1946
- Commissioned: 3 October 1946
- Decommissioned: 1 February 1967
- Fate: Sold 1967

General characteristics
- Class & type: PCS-1376-class minesweeper
- Displacement: 245 tons light; 338 tons full load
- Length: 136 ft (41 m)
- Beam: 24 ft 6 in (7.47 m)
- Draft: 8 ft 7 in (2.62 m)
- Propulsion: 2 × 880 bhp General Motors 8-268A diesel engines, Knobstedt single reduction gear; 2 shafts
- Speed: 14.1 knots (26.1 km/h)
- Complement: 57
- Armament: 1 × 3"/50 caliber gun mount; 1 × 20 mm gun mount; 4 × depth charge projectors; 4 × Hedgehog; 2 × depth charge tracks

USS PCS-1405 was a United States Navy minesweeper in commission from 1944 to 1946. She saw service in the latter stages of World War II.

After her Navy service, she was transferred to the United States Coast and Geodetic Survey, where she saw service as the coastal survey ship USC&GS Bowie (CSS 27) from 1946 to 1967.

== Construction and commissioning ==
The ship was laid down as PC-1405 on 1 May 1943 by the Greenport Basin and Construction Company in Greenport, New York. Reclassified as a "patrol craft sweeper" (PCS) in April 1943 and redesignated PCS-1405, she was launched on 21 August 1943 and commissioned as USS PCS-1405 on 1 February 1944.

== United States Navy service ==
PCS-1450 made a shakedown cruise in the Caribbean Sea, then operated between southern Florida, and Guantanamo Bay, Cuba, as a patrol and escort ship until June 1945. She then was transferred to Pearl Harbor, Hawaii, where she served until February 1946 before returning to the United States.

After undergoing conversion into a survey ship, PCS-1405 was decommissioned in August 1946 and transferred to the United States Coast and Geodetic Survey the same month. She was stricken from the Naval Vessel Register in February 1947.

== United States Coast and Geodetic Survey service ==
The U.S. Coast and Geodetic Survey commissioned the vessel on 3 October 1946 as the coastal survey ship USC&GS Bowie (CSS 27). Bowie served on hydrographic survey duties along the United States West Coast and in Alaska until 1 February 1967, when she was decommissioned. She was sold in 1967.

== Fate ==
Bowie's later fate is unclear. She was photographed as recently as 2003 as MV Bowie in Slatery Bay near Powell River, British Columbia, Canada. As of at least 2005, an effort was underway to preserve her as an historic ship, billing her as the last surviving PCS-type ship.

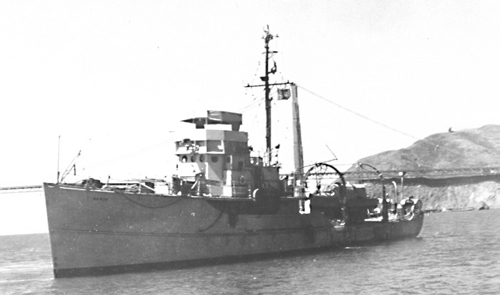
USC&GS Bowie (CSS 27) off San Francisco, California, with the Golden Gate Bridge in the background.
