= Washington State Institute for Public Policy =

Government organization

The Washington State Institute for Public Policy, a creation of the state legislature of the U.S. state of Washington, researches public policy issues of interest to the legislature and state agencies, in association with The Evergreen State College. It was created in 1983 and currently supports public access to various reports and projects occurring in the state. Many of these reports are created to provide data for policy makers of the state.

== Board of directors ==
As of February 2013, the board of directors consists of the following 16 members. Their responsibilities include appointing institute directors, providing reviews, and performing overarching oversight for all institute projects.

Name	Position/Duty
Karen Fraser	Senator
Mike Carrell	Senator
Jeanne Kohl-Welles	Senator
Mark Schoesler	Senator
Ken Conte	Director, Office of Program Research
Richard Rodger	Director, Senate Committee Services
David Schumacher	Director, Office of Financial Management
Cary Condotta	Representative
Robert Rosenman	Professor/Associate Director, Washington State University
Sandra O. Archibald	Dean/Professor of Public Affairs, University of Washington
Thomas L. Purce	President, The Evergreen State College
Unoccupied	Governor Appointee
Unoccupied	House Democratic
Unoccupied	House Democratic
Unoccupied	House Republican

== Areas of focus ==
The Washington State Institute for Public Policy has a majority of research on the following topics:

- Child welfare
- Criminal justice
- Education
- Health care
- Mental health
- Prevention
- Government
- State economy
- Cost–Benefit Analysis
- Research-Based Programs
