= USS Bowie =

Attack transport ship in United States Navy

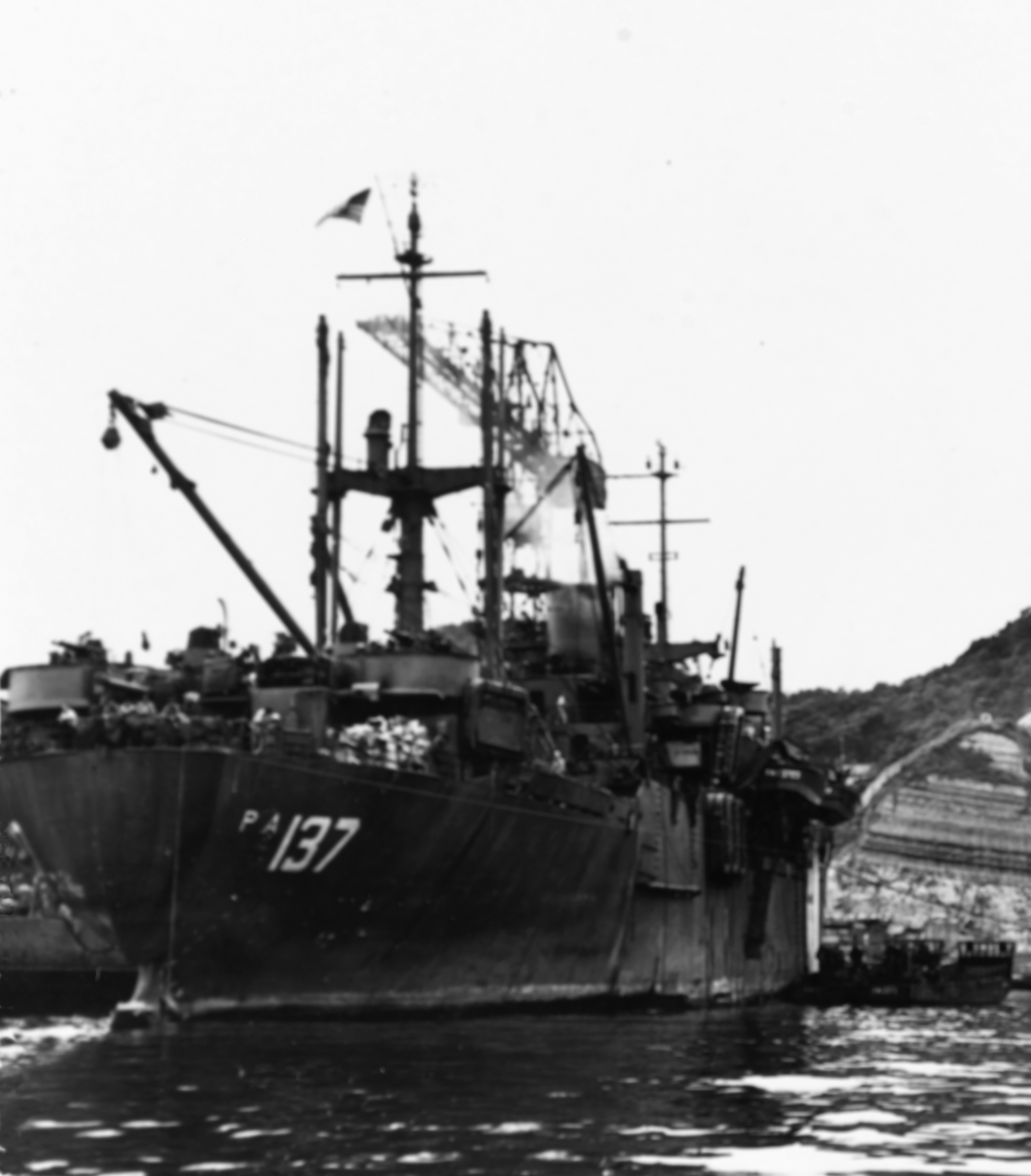

History

United States
- Name: USS Bowie
- Namesake: Bowie County, Texas
- Builder: California Shipbuilding Corporation
- Laid down: 28 August 1944
- Launched: 31 October 1944
- Acquired: 21 December 1944
- Commissioned: 23 December 1944
- Decommissioned: 8 March 1946
- Stricken: 28 March 1946
- Fate: Sold for scrap, 9 April 1973

General characteristics
- Class & type: Haskell-class attack transport
- Displacement: 6,873 tons (lt), 14,837 t (fl)
- Length: 455 ft (139 m)
- Beam: 62 ft (19 m)
- Draft: 24 ft (7 m)
- Propulsion: 1 × geared turbine, 2 × header-type boilers, 1 × propeller, designed 8,500 shp (6,338 kW)
- Speed: 17 knots (31 km/h; 20 mph)
- Boats & landing craft carried: 2 × LCM; 12 × LCVP; 3 × LCPL
- Capacity: Troops: 86 officers, 1,475 enlisted; Cargo: 150,000 cu ft, 2,900 tons
- Complement: 56 officers, 480 enlisted
- Armament: 1 × 5"/38 dual-purpose gun; 4 × twin 40mm guns; 10 × single 20mm guns; late armament, add 1 × 40mm quad mount

USS Bowie (APA-137) was a Haskell-class attack transport ship in service with the United States Navy from 1944 to 1946. She was scrapped in 1973.

== History ==
Bowie (APA-137) was laid down on 28 August 1944 at Wilmington, Los Angeles, by the California Shipbuilding Corp. under a United States Maritime Commission contract (MCV hull 53); launched on 31 October 1944; sponsored by Mrs. J. Shaw; delivered to the Navy on 21 December 1944: and commissioned on 23 December 1944 at Terminal Island, California.

Outfitting, shakedown, and amphibious training occupied Bowie until the second week in February 1945. After post-shakedown availability at Terminal Island, she loaded cargo at the Naval Supply Depot, Oakland, California, and set sail on 20 February for the Mariana Islands. She made a refueling stop at Eniwetok in the Marshalls before arriving at Guam on 10 March. The attack transport completed cargo operations there on 16 March and then moved to Saipan on the 17th to embark casualties. She put to sea for Hawaii that same day and entered Pearl Harbor on 27 March. The ship conducted local operations in Hawaiian waters and engaged in upkeep in Pearl Harbor until mid-April. At that time, she began combat loading elements of the 10th Army bound for duty in the Okinawa campaign.

Bowie stood out of Pearl Harbor on 17 April in a convoy. She arrived off the Hagushi beaches on Okinawa on 10 May. The troops went ashore immediately, and the attack transport began unloading cargo and taking on casualties. During her stay in the Ryūkyūs, Bowie witnessed a number of air raids but did not come under attack herself. On 15 May, the attack transport left Okinawa in a Hawaii-bound convoy. She made two stops, one at Ulithi and the other at Guam, before arriving back in Pearl Harbor on 3 June. She remained there overnight and, on the 4th, headed for the west coast. Bowie reached San Francisco, California, on 10 June and disembarked the casualties and other passengers. Later in the month, she loaded cargo and took on troops. The ship departed from San Francisco Bay on 17 June to sail across the Pacific Ocean to the Philippines, refuelling at Eniwetok. She arrived at Tacloban, on Leyte, on 9 July and discharged cargo and troops, leaving for Hawaii five days later.

Bowie spent almost two months in the Hawaiian Islands. When not in port at either Pearl Harbor or Honolulu, she conducted rehearsal landings at various locations in the islands. On 1 September, she left Pearl Harbor in a convoy bound ultimately for Japan, taking on fuel and provisions at Saipan from 13 to 16 September, and arrived at Sasebo, Japan, on the 22nd. Her troops went ashore on the 24th, and Bowie cleared Sasebo the next day. She took on boats at Subic Bay on 30 September and then moved to Manila. The attack transport moved to Lingayen Gulf on 2 and 3 October, and embarked troops for occupation service in Japan. She departed Lingayen Gulf in convoy on 9 October, and arrived in Sasebo on the 14th but did not disembark the troops until 18 October. On the 22d, Bowie departed Sasebo for Guam, arriving on the 27th and continuing on the same day, reaching San Diego, California, on 12 November.

The attack transport made a round-trip voyage from the west coast to Guam and back between 27 November and 27 December bringing veterans of the Pacific theater home to the United States. On 16 January 1946, Bowie departed San Pedro on her way to the U.S. East Coast. Steaming via San Diego and the Panama Canal, she arrived in Norfolk, Virginia, on 4 February, and began preparations for inactivation.

=== Decommissioning and fate ===
On 8 March 1946, Bowie was placed out of commission at Norfolk. She was returned to the Maritime Commission on 14 March 1946, and her name was struck from the Navy list on 28 March 1946. She was berthed with the National Defense Reserve Fleet at James River, Virginia, and remained there until, on 9 April 1973, she was sold to the Union Minerals and Alloys Corporation, New York City, for scrapping.

== Awards ==
Bowie received one battle star for World War II service at Okinawa.
