= Bowie Canyon =

Coordinates: 52.34°N 179°E

The Bowie Canyon is a submarine canyon located in the Bering Sea. It is a submerged line of demarcation between the Bowers Ridge and the Aleutian Ridge. At its deepest point, it is 1.3 miles deep. It is named after American geodetic engineer, William Bowie.
