= Cullen Buie =

African American mechanical engineer

Cullen R. Buie is an African American mechanical engineer specializing in microbial fuel cells.

== Life and career ==
=== Education ===
Buie's passions changed during high school when he attended an engineering camp that gave him the opportunity to receive college credits and scholarships. This led him to study mechanical engineering at Ohio State University, receiving his Bachelors of Science in 2003. He then went on to earn a Master of Science (M.S.) in 2005 at Stanford University, as well as his Doctor of Philosophy (Ph.D) in 2009 in mechanical engineering. At Stanford, he was a National Science Foundation graduate research fellow, working under Juan Santiago. While working towards his Ph.D, Buie worked on microfluidic electro-osmotic pumps for fuel cells at Stanford.

=== Career ===
After graduating Stanford in 2009, Buie began teaching at Massachusetts Institute of Technology (MIT) in 2010. During his teaching career, Buie had also worked on numerous of research labs. In 2010, he worked on microbial fuel cells at UC Berkeley. In 2012, he was working alongside a team in Australia to test the effectiveness of bacteria in these microbial fuel cells. Buie is the Esther and Harold E. Edgerton Career Development Professor of mechanical engineering at MIT, and leads the Laboratory for Energy and Microsystems Innovation (LEMI).

Cullen Buie is a co-founder of a startup called Kytopen, which has created a technology called Flowfect. This new technology gives scientists a way to mass-produce genetically engineered cells as it opens the pores of cells to deliver genetic material.

== Awards ==
Cuie has received the Defense Advanced Research Projects Agency (DARPA) Young Faculty Award to investigate the challenge of getting genetic material into bacterial cells. He has also received the NSF CAREER Award and the Presidential Early Career Award named by Barack Obama. In 2026, Cuie received the Ruth and Joel Spira Award for Excellence in Teaching at MIT.

== Personal life ==
Buie's older sister, Simone, is the motivation for his research as she had died due to a bacterial infection, sepsis. In disbelief that individuals were still dying from common bacterial infections, Buie and his team are actively researching to eliminate this issue.
