= Timothy Buie =

Autism researcher

Timothy M. Buie
- Medical career
- Institutions: Boston Children's Hospital; Harvard Medical School

Timothy M. Buie is a pediatric gastroenterologist at Boston Children's Hospital. Buie joined Harvard Medical School in 1998 after previously practicing at Pediatric Gastroenterology Associates for eight years. He was also the director of Gastrointestinal and Nutritional Services at MGH's Lurie Center for Autism. He is well known for his research pertaining to the possible connection between autism and gastrointestinal disorders, and has told the Interagency Autism Coordinating Committee that over half of autistic children experience gastrointestinal symptoms, whereas he stated that this was the case for "between 50 and 70%" of children with autism in an interview with ABC News (United States)|ABC News. He has also said that a subset of autistic children (though not the majority) may benefit from gluten-free, casein-free diets, and that more research is needed into this area. Buie was honored as "Professional of the Year" by the Autism Society of America in 2009.

== Education ==
Buie received his bachelor's degree in biology in 1984 and his MD in 1988, both from the University of Missouri at Kansas City. He then completed his fellowship at Yale University and his residency at Bridgeport Hospital.

== Research ==
Buie has published several papers regarding gastrointestinal problems in autistic children. These studies have usually concluded that gastrointestinal problems are not any more common in autistic children than they are in neurotypical children. Buie also co-authored a paper with Mady Hornig which provided further evidence against a link between the MMR vaccine and autism.

== Views on autism ==
With regard to the cause of autism, Buie said, in an interview with PBS NewsHour, that "there are over 100 suspect genes that are associated with a higher frequency of autism. So there is clearly an underlying genetic predisposition to this condition in many children. But the possibility that there is some environmental factor or some extrinsic factor that affects those children, I think, still needs to sit on the table." He also said that scientific studies investigating the potential link between the MMR vaccine and autism have not supported the hypothesis of a link between the two.
