= Dougal M. Buie =

American lawyer

Biographical details
- Born: June 27, 1888; Red Springs, North Carolina, U.S.
- Died: March 30, 1938 (aged 49); Eustis, Florida, U.S.
- Education: University of North Carolina at Chapel Hill

Coaching career (HC unless noted)

Baseball
- 1911: Florida

Dougal McRee Buie (June 27, 1888 – March 30, 1938) was an American college football and baseball player and coach as well as an attorney. Buie attended both Davidson College and the University of North Carolina at Chapel Hill before attending the University of Florida.
