= Maxine Mimms =

American educator (1928–2024)

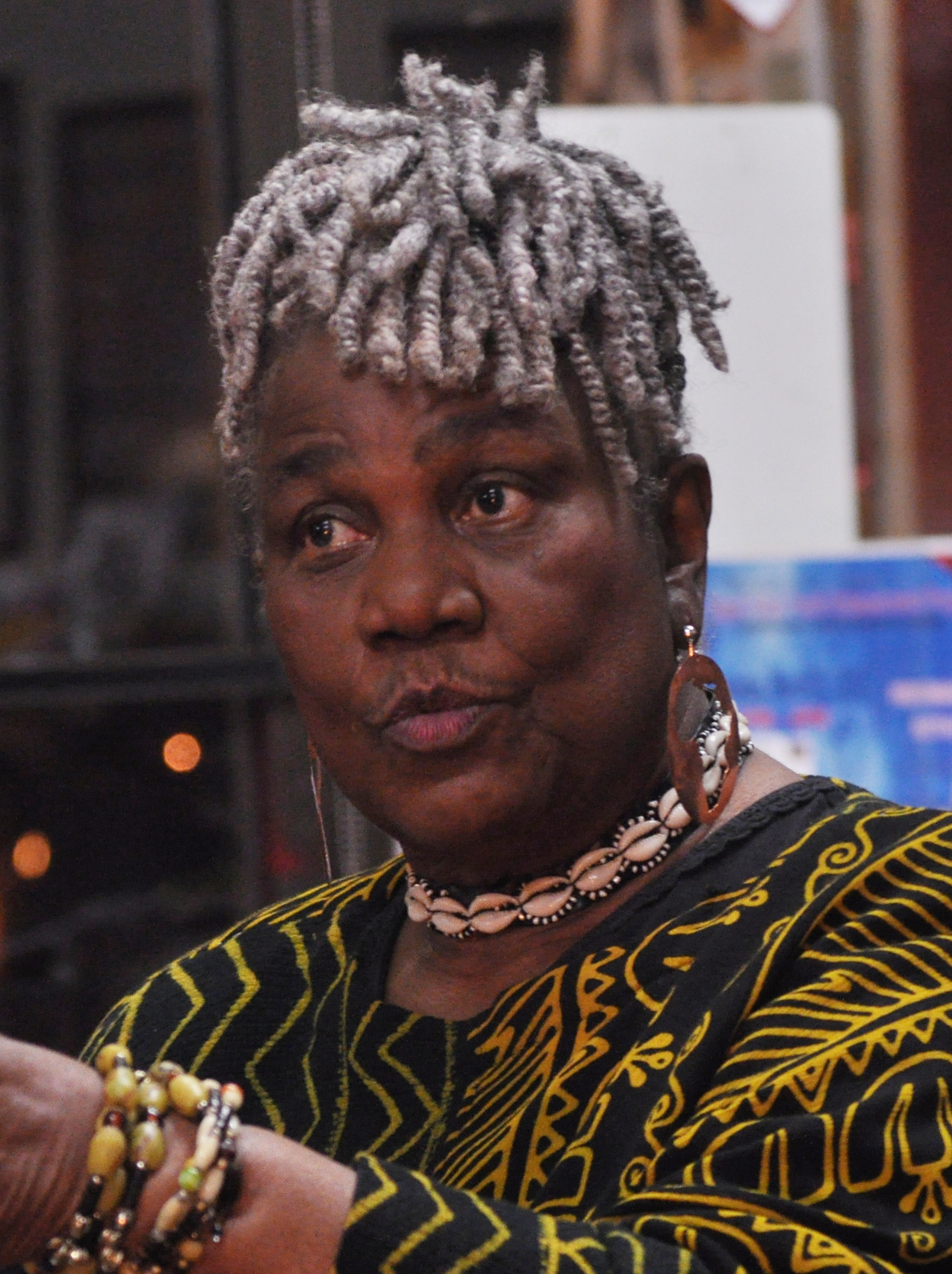
- Mimms in 2012
- Born: Maxine Buie; March 4, 1928; Newport News, Virginia, U.S.
- Died: October 8, 2024 (aged 96); Tacoma, Washington, U.S.
- Education: Virginia Union University
- Occupation: Educator

Maxine Buie Mimms (March 4, 1928 – October 8, 2024) was an American educator and founder of the Tacoma Campus of Evergreen State College in Tacoma, Washington.

Mimms was a friend of Maya Angelou and Rev. Dr. Martin Luther King, Jr., and served on the advisory board for the Oprah Winfrey Leadership Academy for Girls in South Africa.

== Early life and education ==
Mimms was born in Newport News, Virginia, on March 4, 1928, to parents Isabella DeBerry Buie and Benson Ebenezer Buie. She attended Booker T. Washington School and graduated from Huntington High School with highest honors in 1946. She earned her B.A. from Virginia Union University in 1950.

== Career ==
=== Early career ===
In the early 1950s, Mimms relocated to Detroit, Michigan, where she served as a social worker. She would later earn a Ph.D. in educational administration from Union Graduate School in San Francisco. When her husband was appointed to a university post in 1953, they relocated to Seattle, Washington where Mimms taught at Leschi Elementary School. Among her 4th grade students was Jimi Hendrix who pantomimed playing drums and taught the class a song to remember the names of the continents.

In 1961, Mimms taught in Washington's Kirkland Public Schools until working for the Seattle Public School Administration in 1964. In 1969, Mimms served as special assistant to the director of the Women's Bureau in the United States Department of Labor, Elizabeth Duncan Koontz.

=== Evergreen State College ===
In 1972, Mimms returned to the education field, working as a faculty member at Evergreen State College. At Evergreen State College, Mimms focused on developing an educational program that would serve place-bound working adult students. Her focus on serving the educational needs of urban, African American adult learners combined with an interest in teaching inner-city adults, led to the founding principles of the Tacoma Campus. In 1982, the Evergreen Tacoma campus was finally formalized with Mimms as the program's director, and the motto "Enter to Learn, Depart to Serve". Mimms's goal was to provide an educational experience that would attract and retain black students from the Hilltop neighborhood.

In 1982, the Evergreen-Tacoma campus was formally established under Mimms's leadership. Mimms's mission as Director of Evergreen-Tacoma was to increase the number of African Americans in Washington with degrees and improve the household value on education for the African American community. Mimms became a national consultant in curriculum design and instructional methods. In 1990, Mimms retired as Director of Evergreen-Tacoma and became an emeritus faculty member. In 2001, Mimms was awarded the first annual Sustainable Community Outstanding Leadership Award.

== Maxine Mimms Academy ==
In 2004, Mimms founded the Maxine Mimms Academy, a non-profit organization in Tacoma's Hilltop neighborhood established to serve youth expelled or suspended from public schools.

== Death ==
Mimms died in her sleep in Tacoma, Washington, on October 8, 2024, at the age of 96.
