= James Bowie High School =

James Bowie High School may refer to:

- Bowie High School (Arlington, Texas)
- Bowie High School (Austin, Texas)
- James Bowie High School (Simms, Texas)

== See also ==
- Bowie High School (disambiguation)
