= Bowie High School =

Bowie High School may refer to:

- Bowie High School (Arizona) in Bowie, Arizona
- Bowie High School (Maryland) in Bowie, Maryland
- Bowie High School (Arlington, Texas) in Arlington, Texas
- Bowie High School (Austin, Texas) in Austin, Texas
- Bowie High School (El Paso, Texas) in El Paso, Texas
- Bowie High School (Bowie, Texas) in Bowie, Texas

== See also ==
- James Bowie High School (disambiguation)
